= Secotan =

Historic Native American tribe

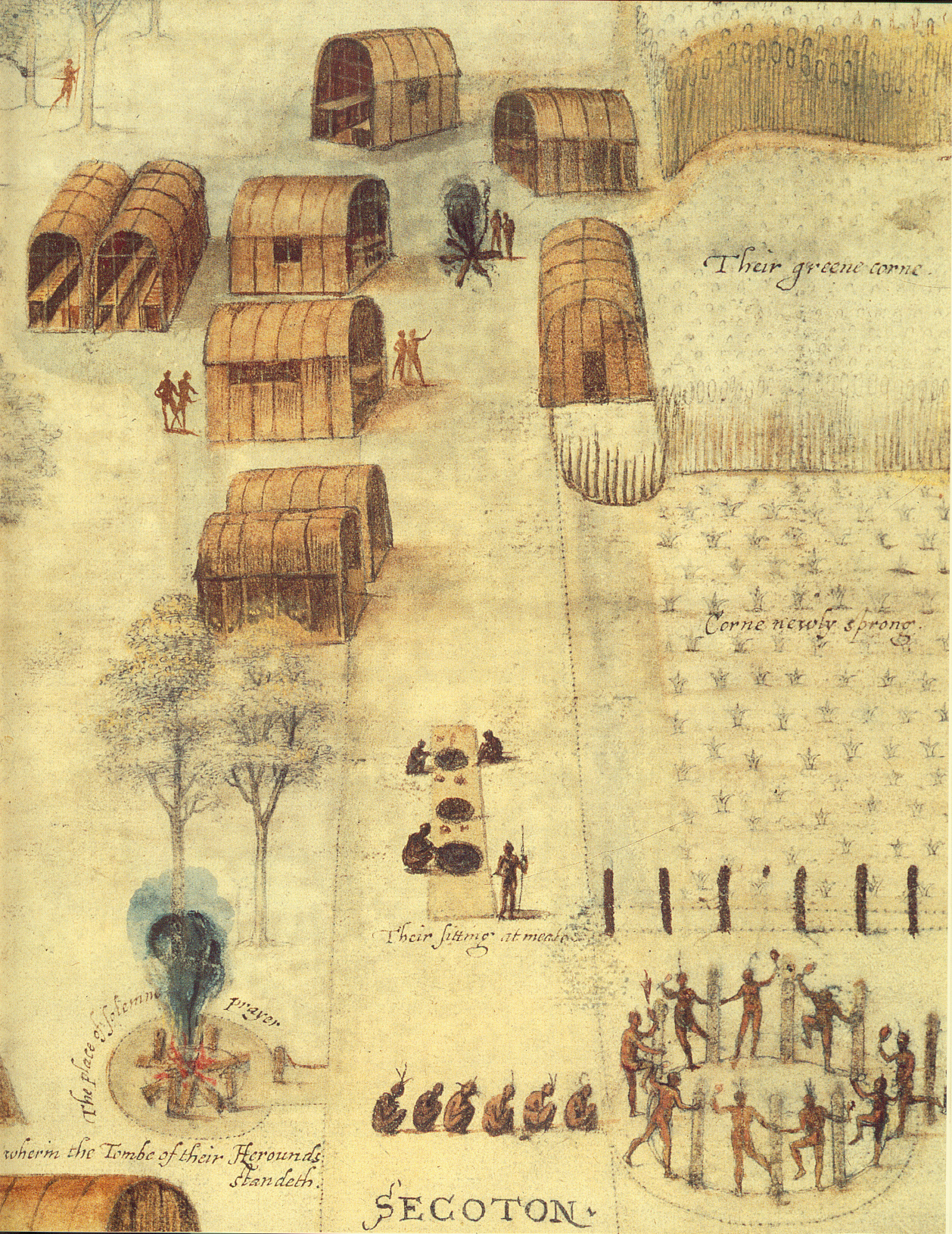
- The village of Secotan (read as Secoton) in Roanoke, painted by Governor John White, c. 1585

Total population
- merged into Machapunga

Regions with significant populations
- Eastern North Carolina

Languages
- Carolina Algonquian language

Religion
- Indigenous religion

Related ethnic groups
- other North Carolina Algonquians

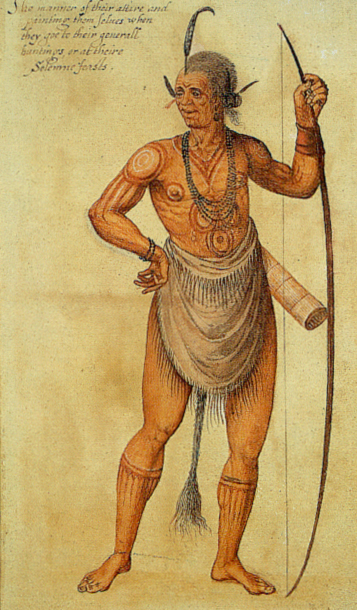
Watercolor painting by Governor John White, c. 1585, of an Algonkin Indian Chief in what is today North Carolina. (Manteo)

The Secotans were one of several groups of Native Americans dominant in the Carolina sound region, between 1584 and 1590, with which English colonists had varying degrees of contact. Secotan villages included the Secotan, Aquascogoc, Dasamongueponke, Pomeiock (Pamlico) and Roanoac. Other local groups included the Chowanoke (including village Moratuc), Weapemeoc, Chesapeake, Ponouike, Neusiok, and Mangoak (Tuscarora), and all resided along the banks of the Albemarle and Pamlico sounds.

They spoke the Carolina Algonquian language, an Eastern Algonquian language.

== Background ==
In the Carolinas, colonization did not exist as a straight-line transition, from Native American to European rule. A rivalry marked the relationship between the two European powers, the English and the Spanish. Rivalries also existed between the Native American groups. Additionally, the Europeans often found themselves caught in the middle of conflicts, which existed between Native American groups. Each group, European or Native American placed the interest of their group over the interest of all others. The English, the Spanish, and the Native American groups they had contact with each acted against the others, as counter-colonizers of the Carolinas as exhibited through the study of Roanoke Island.

In 1490, prior to England's entry into North American colonialism, the Treaty of Medina del Campo lowered tariffs between England and Spain, and ushered in an era of increased trading between the two countries. The marriage of Henry VIII of England and Catherine of Aragon (Spain) sealed the treaty. During this time, many English traders moved to southern Spain, in the area of Andalusia, and trade flourished. In 1533, Spanish officials began to harass the English in Spain, who were required as Englishmen to "swear under oath" that Henry VIII was the head of the church. The requirement of the oath made the Englishmen in Spain subject to persecution, under charges of heresy, by the Spanish Inquisition.

To circumvent Spanish officials and the inquisition, English traders devised a system, in which they would travel to Spanish possessions in the Caribbean, to pick up Spanish goods, and take them back to England, with no religious conflicts. By the 1560s, the English faced increasing Spanish hostility. In 1585, the Englishman Richard Hakluyt published a book, Discourse of Western Planting, which concluded that the English should establish their own colony in the mid-latitudes of North America, to end dependency on Spanish goods, by creating their own supply lines. By April of the same year, Sir Richard Grenville left England, bound for the Carolina coast, with 100 colonists, which marked the beginning of England's colonial endeavors in America.

Spanish colonies established the first European colonies in the Carolinas, under the leadership of Spanish captain, Juan Pardo, in 1567 and 1568. Pardo declared that the Catawba, Wateree, and Saxaphaw groups were subject to the Spanish crown, and he successfully persuaded the groups to construct housing and make food provisions, which created eleven Spanish settlements in the Carolinas. The Spanish still inhabited the Carolinas when the English arrived.

While the Spanish settled in the interior of the Carolinas, the English arrived on the coast. The placement of a colony at Roanoke marked the first English colonial presence in North America.

== Amadas and Barlowe, Secotans and Neiosioke ==
Before the English placed their first settlement on Roanoke Island, Master Philip Amadas and Master Arthur Barlowe executed an expedition on April 27, 1584, on behalf of Sir Walter Raleigh, who received an English charter, to establish a colony a month earlier. During their expedition, Barlowe took detailed notes relating to conflicts and rivalries between different groups of Native Americans. In one such account, Manteo, of the Croatoan (Hatteras), explained his own tribal history, in relation to a neighboring tribe at the mouth of the Neuse River, the Neusiok, referred to as the Neiosioke by Barlowe. According to Manteo, the Croatoan were enduring years of warfare with the Neiosioke, and "some years earlier," he had met with the Neiosioke king, in an effort to ensure a "permanent coexistence." The two leaders had arranged a feast between the two groups. An unspecified number of Neiosioke men and thirty women attended a feast in the town of Croatoan. The Neiosioke had executed an ambush on the Secotans at the feast, and by the time fighting had ended, the Neiosioke had "slewn them every one, reserving the women and children only."

In conveying this "inter-tribal" history to Barlowe, Manteo saw an opportunity to advance the interest of the Croatoan. Manteo and his people attempted on several occasions to convince the English to join them in devising a surprise attack against the Neiosioke. The Englishmen, uncertain of "whether their perswasion be to the ende they may be revenged of their enemies, or for the love they beare to us," declined to help the Croatoan wage war against their rivals. Instead, the English established a trusting relationship with the Croatoan, exemplified by the willingness of two Croatoan men, Manteo and Wanchese, to accompany Amadas and Barlowe back to England.

== Later records ==
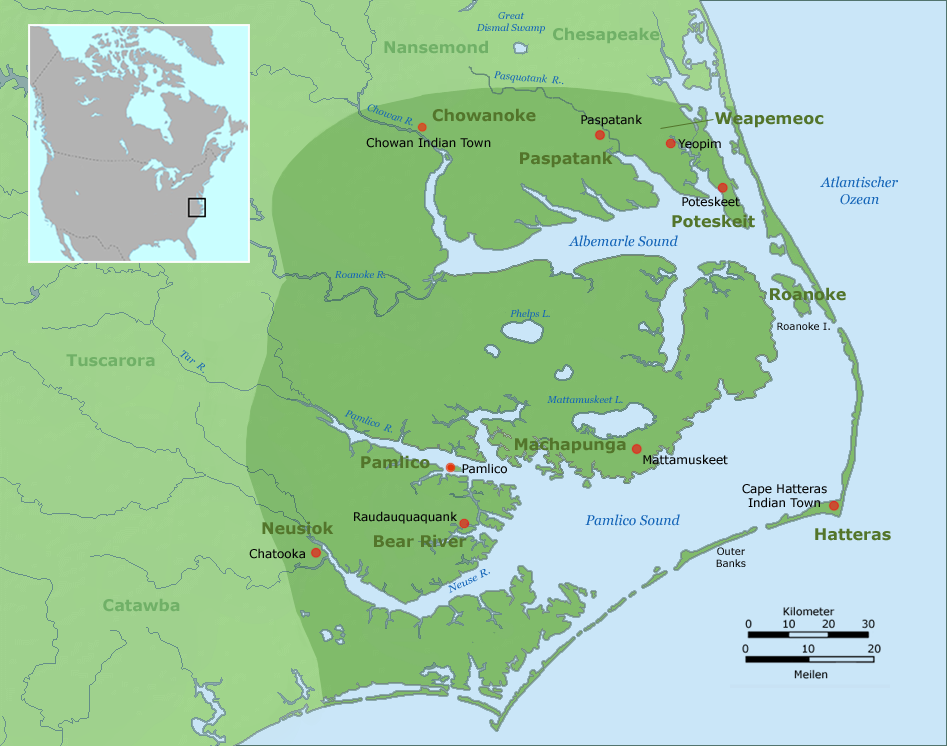
Distribution of Carolina Algonquian speaking peoples 1657 to 1795

The Secotan remained in the same area until 1644 or 1645, when colonists from Virginia Colony attacked them and drove them off in the last of the Anglo-Powhatan Wars. British settlement in the area increased soon afterward, and the land was officially transferred from the Virginia Colony to the Province of Carolina in 1665. Surviving Secotan descendants merged into the Machapunga.

== See also ==
- Algonquian languages
- Algonquian peoples
- Aquascogoc
- Carolina Algonquian
- Chowanoke
- Chesapeake (tribe)
- Dasamongueponke
