= Croatan =

Historic Native American tribe

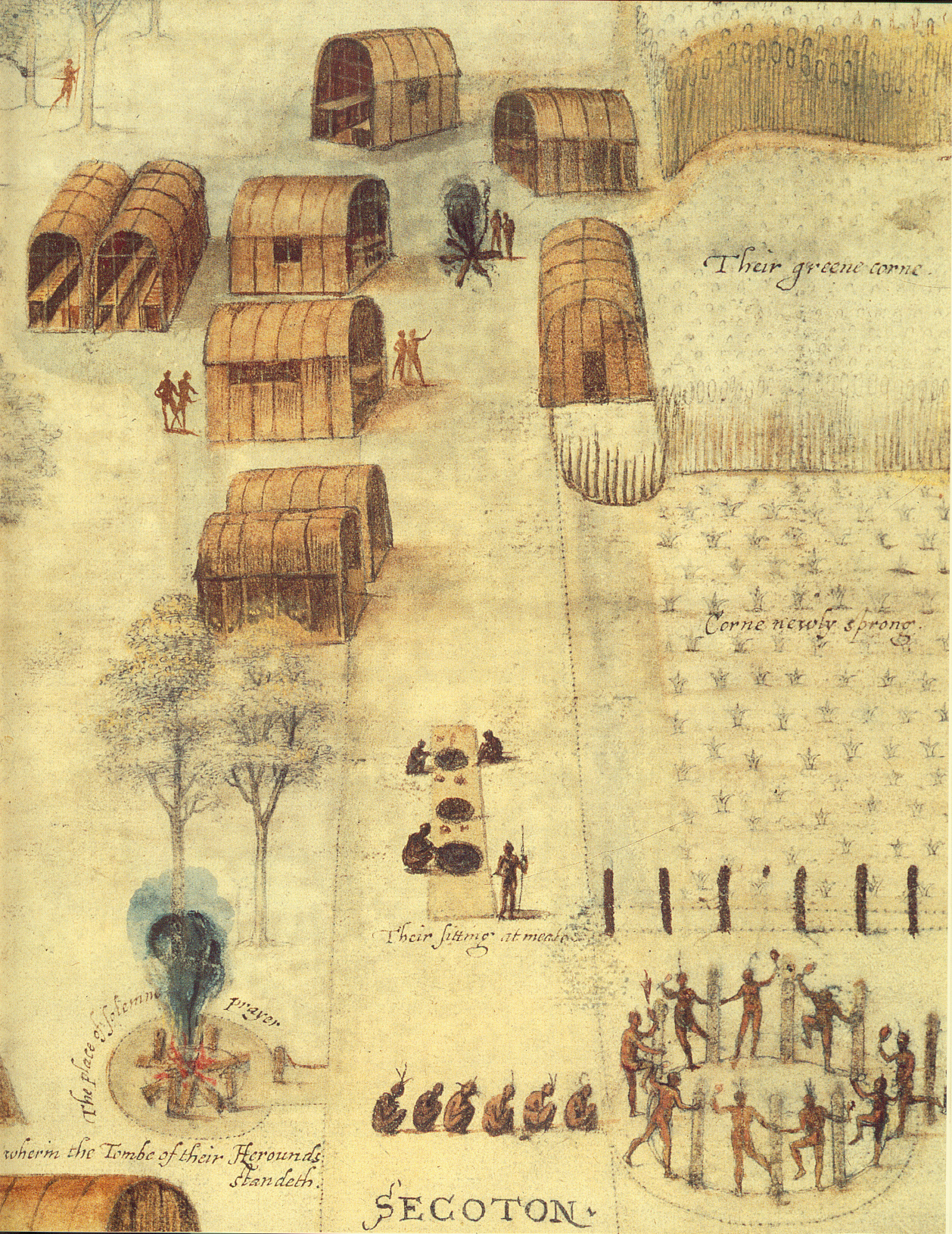

Total population
- extinct as a tribe

Regions with significant populations
- North Carolina

Languages
- Carolina Algonquian

Religion
- Indigenous religion

Related ethnic groups
- Roanoke

The Croatan, also known as Hatteras, were a small Native American ethnic group living in the coastal areas of what is now North Carolina. They might have been a branch of the larger Roanoke people or allied with them. The Croatan lived in current Dare County, an area encompassing the Alligator River, Croatan Sound, Roanoke Island, Ocracoke Island, and parts of the Outer Banks, including Hatteras Island.

Their leaders, called Werowances ("he who is rich"), each controlled up to 18 towns. The greatest were able to muster 700 or 800 fighting men. Weroances and their families were accorded great status and received respect, but they were not all-powerful. To pursue a collective goal, Weroances had to convince their followers that the action would be in the nation's best interest. The Weroance was responsible for spreading wealth, and, if unable to do so, he received less respect.

Phillip W. Evans, a linguist, suggested the word Croatan means "council town" or "talk town", which likely indicates the residence of an important leader and a place where councils were held.

The state-recognized tribes claiming descent from the Croatan people have members who live predominantly in Cumberland, Sampson, and Harnett counties.

== Name ==
The synonym for Croatan, Hatteras, was first used by the English settler John Lawson. Lawson was writing a book where the Hatteras were mentioned for the first time. Although the meaning of Hatteras is unknown, the people from that island were known as "the people of shallow water." Hatteras is considered to be a synonym for the Croatans.

== Language ==
The Croatan spoke a language in the Algonquian language family.

== Religion ==
According to Thomas Harriot, the Native Americans living in coastal North Carolina believed there was "one only chief and great God, which has been from all eternity" and which made petty gods "to be used in the creation and government to follow." They believed in the immortality of the soul. Upon death, the soul either enters heaven to live with the gods or goes to a place near the setting sun called Popogusso, to burn for eternity in a huge pit of fire. The concepts of heaven and hell were impressed upon the common people to encourage them to respect leaders and live a life that would produce rewards in the afterlife.

Conjurors and priests were distinctive spiritual leaders. Priests were chosen for their knowledge and wisdom and were leaders of the organized religion. Conjurors, on the other hand, were chosen for their magical abilities. Conjurors were thought to have powers from a personal connection with a supernatural being (mostly spirits from the animal world).

== History ==
The Croatan first had contact with English settlers, notably John White, in 1585, and were extinct as a tribe by the mid-18th century.

In 1586, the Weroance of the Roanoke named Wanchese severed his former good relations with the English, leaving Manteo as the colonists' sole native ally. Despite the varying relationships, the Roanoke and Croatan tribes were believed to have been on good terms with English colonists of the Roanoke Colony. Wanchese accompanied the English on a trip to England, although he was distrustful of the English. In 1701, their population was estimated to be 80 people. During the 1711 Tuscarora War, the Croatan sided with the colonists and fought against the Tuscarora and their allies for the colonists. This cost them heavily and many were driven from their lands during the warfare.

Some Algonquian peoples on the coasts of the Tidewater region advocated limited cooperation, while other tribes further inland, such as the Yamasee, Cherokee and Chickasaw resisted this approach. Later, this conflict between Indigenous tribes and settlers would lead to the Yamasee War. Nations that maintained mutually beneficial contact with the settlers gained power through their access to and control of European trade goods. While the English may have held military superiority over the local Tidewater nations, the Native Americans' control over food and natural resources was a decisive factor in the conflict with early settlers.

It is claimed that some descendants of the Hatteras may be part of the Lumbee community, but historian Karen Blu states that this assumption is speculative, and based on documentation of which tribes had lived in the area before, and that there are no firm links between them and the Lumbee. Some documentation indicates they migrated to an area west of Lake Ontario by 1891.

=== The Lost Colony ===
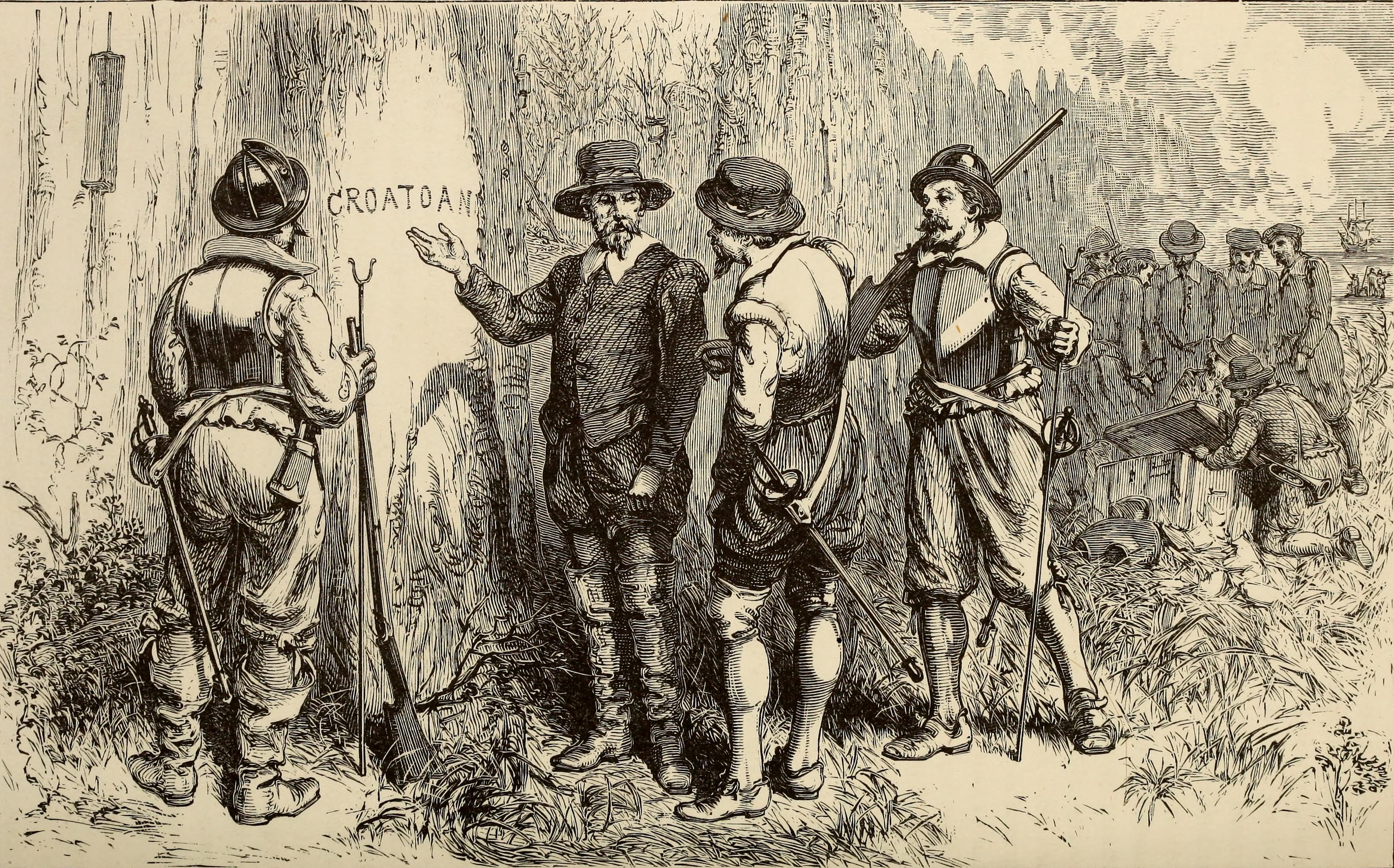
Governor John White returned to Roanoke in 1590 to find the word "Croatoan" carved on a palisade.

Some of the survivors of the Lost Colony of Roanoke may have joined the Croatan. Governor White finally reached Roanoke Island on August 18, 1590, three years after he had last seen them there, but he found his colony had been long deserted. The buildings had collapsed and "the houses [were] taken down." The few clues about the colonists' whereabouts included the letters "CROATOAN" carved into a palisade. Croatoan was the name of a nearby island (likely modern-day Hatteras Island) in addition to the local tribe of Native Americans. Roanoke Island was not originally the planned location for the colony and the idea of moving elsewhere had been discussed. Before the Governor's departure, he and the colonists had agreed that a message would be carved into a tree if they had moved and would include an image of a Maltese Cross if the decision was made by force. White found no such cross and was hopeful that his family was still alive.

==== Speculation of the fate of the "Lost Colony" ====
In 1709, English explorer John Lawson wrote A New Voyage to Carolina, in which he recounts the history of North Carolina. He describes the remains of an English fort on Roanoke Island, and then conjectures that the "Hatteras Indians" were descended from the settlers at Roanoke, stating "A farther Confirmation of this we have from the Hatteras Indians, who either then lived on Ronoak-Island, or much frequented it. These tell us, that several of their Ancestors were white People, and could talk in a Book, as we do; the Truth of which is confirm’d by gray Eyes being found frequently amongst these Indians, and no others."

==== Research ====
Researchers from the University of Bristol, United Kingdom, have also been excavating on Hatteras Island in conjunction with the Croatoan Archaeological Society.

Roberta Estes founded the Lost Colony Center for Science and Research, which excavated English artifacts within the territory of the former Croatan tribe. The artifacts may also be evidence of trade with the tribe or of Natives finding them at the former colony site. The center conducted the Lost Colony DNA Project to try to determine if there are European lines among Croatan descendants. However, no bones from the Lost Colony have been found to sequence DNA, and, as of 2019, the project had not identified any living descendants.

== Modern claimants ==
=== Origins of theories of descent ===
In 1885, State Representative Hamilton McMillan proposed the ancestors of the Lumbee and Tennessee Melungeons were connected with the Roanoke colonists and contemporary coastal North Carolina tribes. Based on this, some Lumbee, based in North Carolina, self-identified as descendants of the Croatan and survivors of the Lost Colony of Roanoke Island. McMillan's hypothesis contended that the colonists migrated with the Indians inland. In 1914, Special Indian Agent O. M. McPherson published a list of names of the Lost Colony, claiming names on the list were typical Indian names in the North Carolina counties of Robeson and Sampson, due to their intermarriage with other settlers, claiming many of the surnames included were those of Croatan Indians.

==== Criticism ====
Historian Karen Blu states that connections between the Lumbee and specific earlier tribes cannot be traced in the historical record, and that many repeat the theory, often adding more broken evidence. Sociolinguist Walt Wolfram suggests that identifying with the prestige of Roanoke settler origin served to elevate their sense of privilege though association with European rather than African lineage, while simultaneously maintaining a Native American claim to identity. Lumbee historian Malinda Maynor Lowery is "highly skeptical" of the theory of descent from the Lost Colony. Croatan is noted to be an identity adopted by groups labelled "triracial isolates".

=== History of identification ===
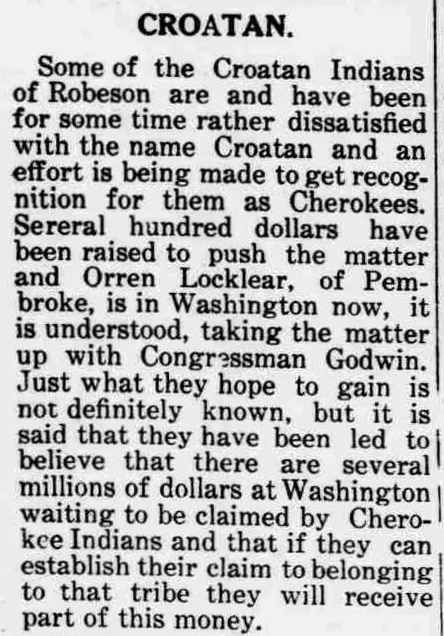
Newspaper excerpt discussing the self-identified Croatan Indians, 1910.

Lowery wrote that, in 1890, a group of about 100 people who self-identified as Croatan descendants, or Lumbees, left Robeson County, North Carolina, for southern Georgia. They headed back to Bulloch County where they could keep their people together as "Indians", using Jim Crow South segregation to develop themselves as a community. Later on, the self-identified Croatans faced both economic hardship and social injustice, and migrated back to North Carolina by 1920.

In 1910, the North Carolina state legislature renamed the Croatan Indians in North Carolina to "Cherokee". The North Carolina state legislature recognized the Croatan Indians of Robeson County and the Croatan Indians of Sampson County in 1911. The General Assembly ruled "That said Indians and their descendants shall have separate schools for their children, school committees of their own race and color, and shall be allowed to select teachers of their own choice". Today, these two groups are state-recognized tribes, known as the Lumbee Tribe of North Carolina and the Coharie Intra-tribal Council, Inc., respectively. The Texas Lumbee also identify with Croatan descent.

The Haliwa-Saponi tribe previously identified as the Haliwarnash Croatan Indian Club in the 1940s, but dropped the reference to the historic Croatan a few years later. The predecessors of the Waccamaw Siouan Indians repeatedly attempted to have themselves referred to as Croatan Indians in order to obtain state funded segregated schools. While they had switched to a Cherokee identity by 1913, they continued to apply as Croatans until officially applying as Cherokee in 1927.

The Croatan Indian Tribe of South Carolina, an unrecognized organization, claims to descend from Croatan people. The South Carolina recognition committee stated the tribe had no documented history in the state. Committee member Ven Thompson stated Croatan was historically used as a racial term similarly to "mulatto", and did not necessarily denote a Native American.

== Notable people ==
- Manteo, ambassador and mediator; disappeared after 1587.

== See also ==
- Algonquian languages
- Algonquian peoples
- Aquascogoc
- Dasamongueponke
- Pamlico
- Roanoke people
- Secotan
- Hatteras Island
