= Aquascogoc =

Total population
- Extinct as a tribe

Regions with significant populations
- North Carolina

Languages
- Carolina Algonquian language

Religion
- Tribal religion (historical)

Related ethnic groups
- Secotan, Dasamongueponke

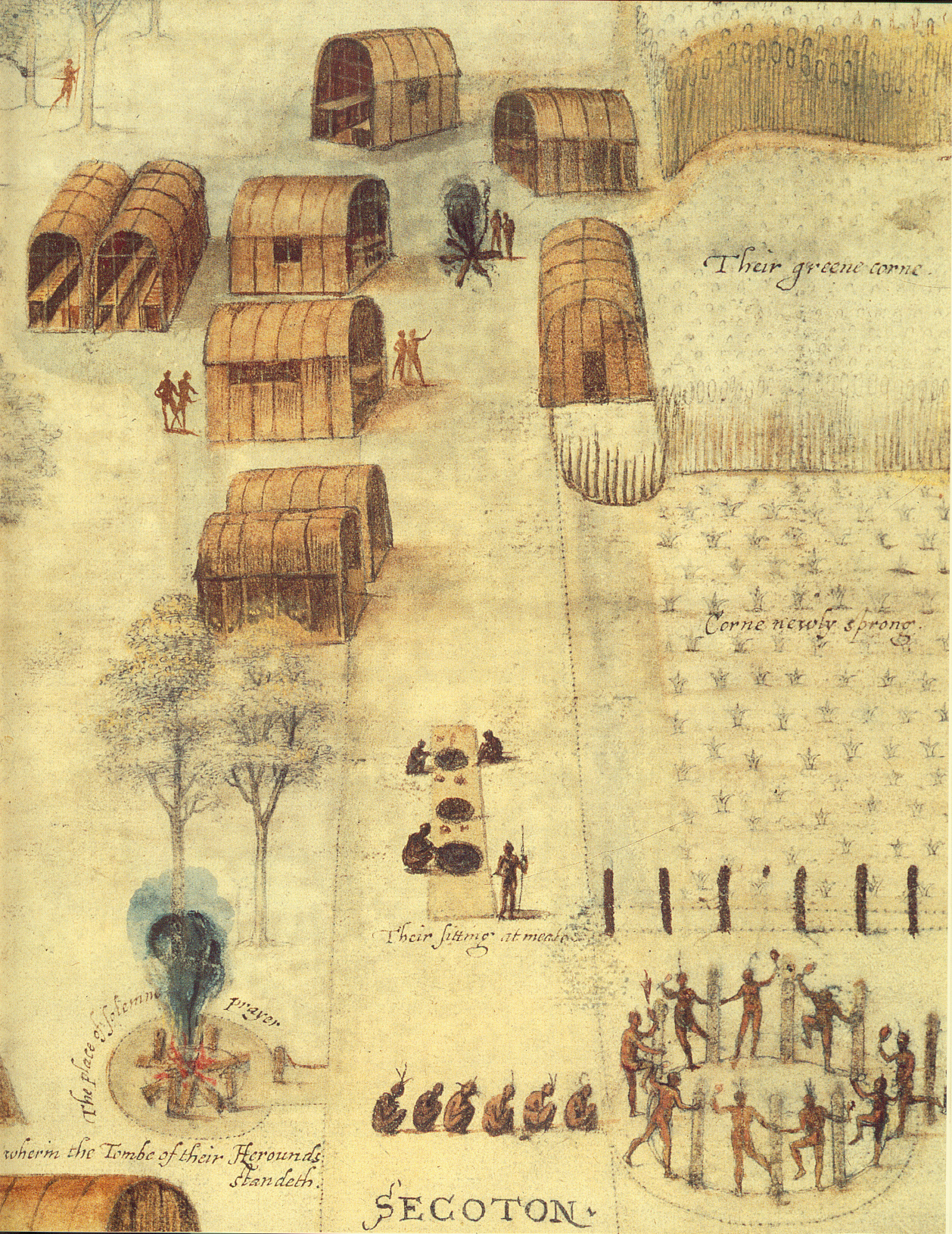
The village of Secoton in Roanoke, painted by Governor John White c.1585

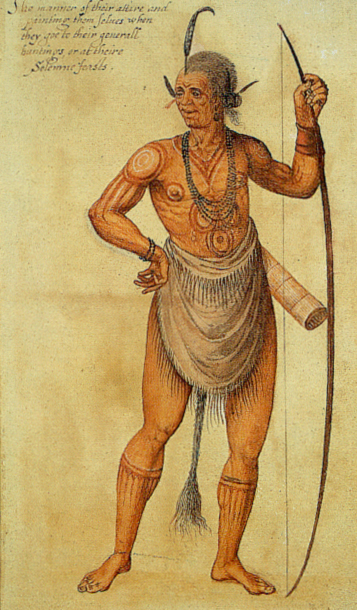
Watercolor painting by Governor John White c.1585 of an Algonkin Indian Chief in what is today North Carolina.

The Aquascogoc is the name given to a Native American tribe of Secotan people and also the name of a village encountered by English colonists during their late 16th century attempts to settle and establish permanent colonies in what is now North Carolina, known at the time as Virginia. Together with the rest of Secotan people they formed a part of the Native American group known as the Carolina Algonquian Indians, and spoke the now extinct Carolina Algonquian language. In 1585 the village of Aquascogoc was burned by Sir Richard Grenville, in retaliation for the alleged theft of a silver drinking vessel.

== Roanoke colony ==
Sir Richard Grenville was the leader of the 1585 expedition which first attempted to land English settlers on Roanoke island. Guided by Chief Manteo, Grenville arrived at the village but the inhabitants showed little inclination to meet with him, and the settlers soon returned to their boats. However, a silver drinking cup was found to be missing, and was believed to have been stolen by the Aquascogoc, leading to a furious reaction from Grenville. During the angry exchanges which followed, the village of Aquascogoc was torched on Grenville's orders.

The Aquascogoc would however have their revenge. Grenville left Roanoke, leaving behind fifteen men, who were all battle-hardened. When Governor John White returned in 1587 he searched for the fifteen, but found only bones. White quickly made contact with friendly natives led by Chief Manteo, who explained to him that the lost fifteen had been killed by hostile Secotan, Aquascogoc and Dasamongueponke warriors, choosing a time and place of attack "of great advantage to the savages".

== Legacy ==
Much of what is known about the lives of the Aquascogoc and other Algonquian tribes in 16th-century North Carolina survives because of the watercolor paintings and the journal kept by Governor John White who was commissioned in 1585 to "draw to life" the inhabitants of the New World and their surroundings. During White's time at Roanoke Island, he completed numerous watercolor drawings of the surrounding landscape and native peoples. These works are significant as they are the most informative illustrations of a Native American society of the Eastern seaboard, and predate the first body of "discovery voyage art" created in the late 18th century by the artists who sailed with Captain James Cook. They represent the sole surviving visual record of the native inhabitants of America, encountered by England's first settlers.

White's enthusiasm for watercolor paint was unusual; most contemporary painters preferred to use oil-based paints. White's watercolors would soon become a sensation in Europe, and it was not long before the paintings were engraved by the Flemish master engraver Theodore de Bry. Through the medium of print, the illustrations became widely known and distributed; they were published in 1590 under the title "America".

== See also ==
- Algonquian peoples
- Dasamongueponke
- Pamlico
- Secotan
