= Carolina Algonquian language =

Extinct Eastern-Algonquian language

Carolina Algonquian
- Pamlico
- Native to: United States
- Region: North Carolina
- Ethnicity: Carolina Algonquians (Croatan, Secotan, Pamlico, Machapunga, Roanoke, Weapemoc, Chowanoc)
- Extinct: c. 1790s-1800s
- Language family: Algic: Algonquian; Eastern Algonquian; Carolina Algonquian

Language codes
- ISO 639-3: crr – inclusive code Individual code: pmk – Pamlico (deprecated)
- Glottolog: caro1243
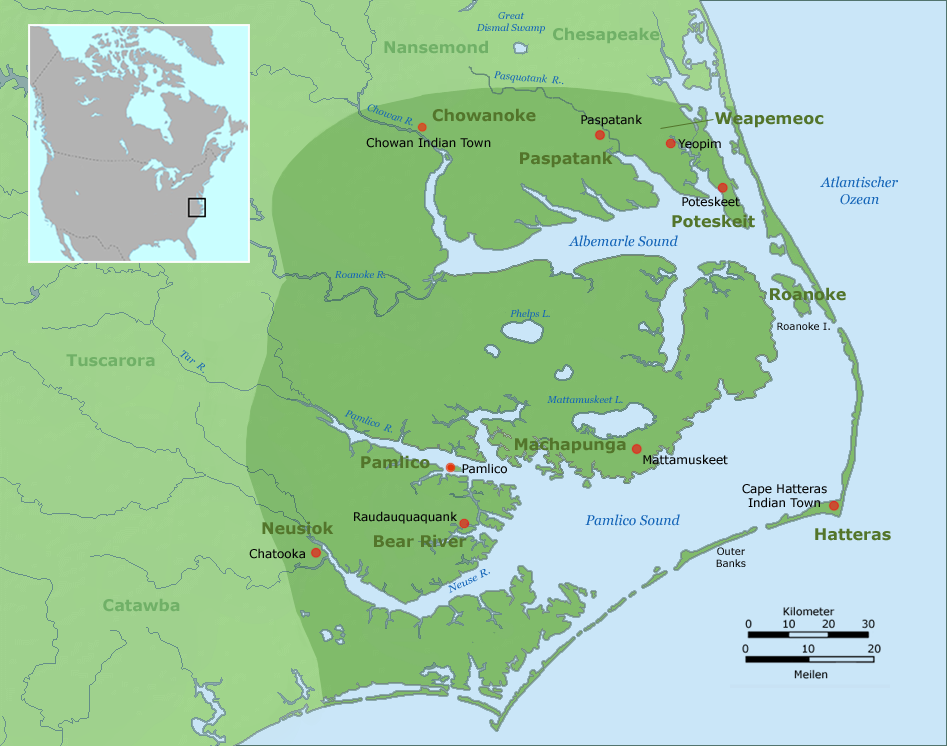
- Tribal territories of the North Carolina Algonquians, Machapunga (previously known as Secotan) (subgroups Roanoke, Bear River), Chowanoke and Weapemeoc (subgroups Poteskeit and Paspatank), 1657-1795

Carolina Algonquian (also known as Pamlico, Croatoan) is an extinct Algonquian language of the Eastern Algonquian subgroup formerly spoken in North Carolina, United States.

== Classification ==
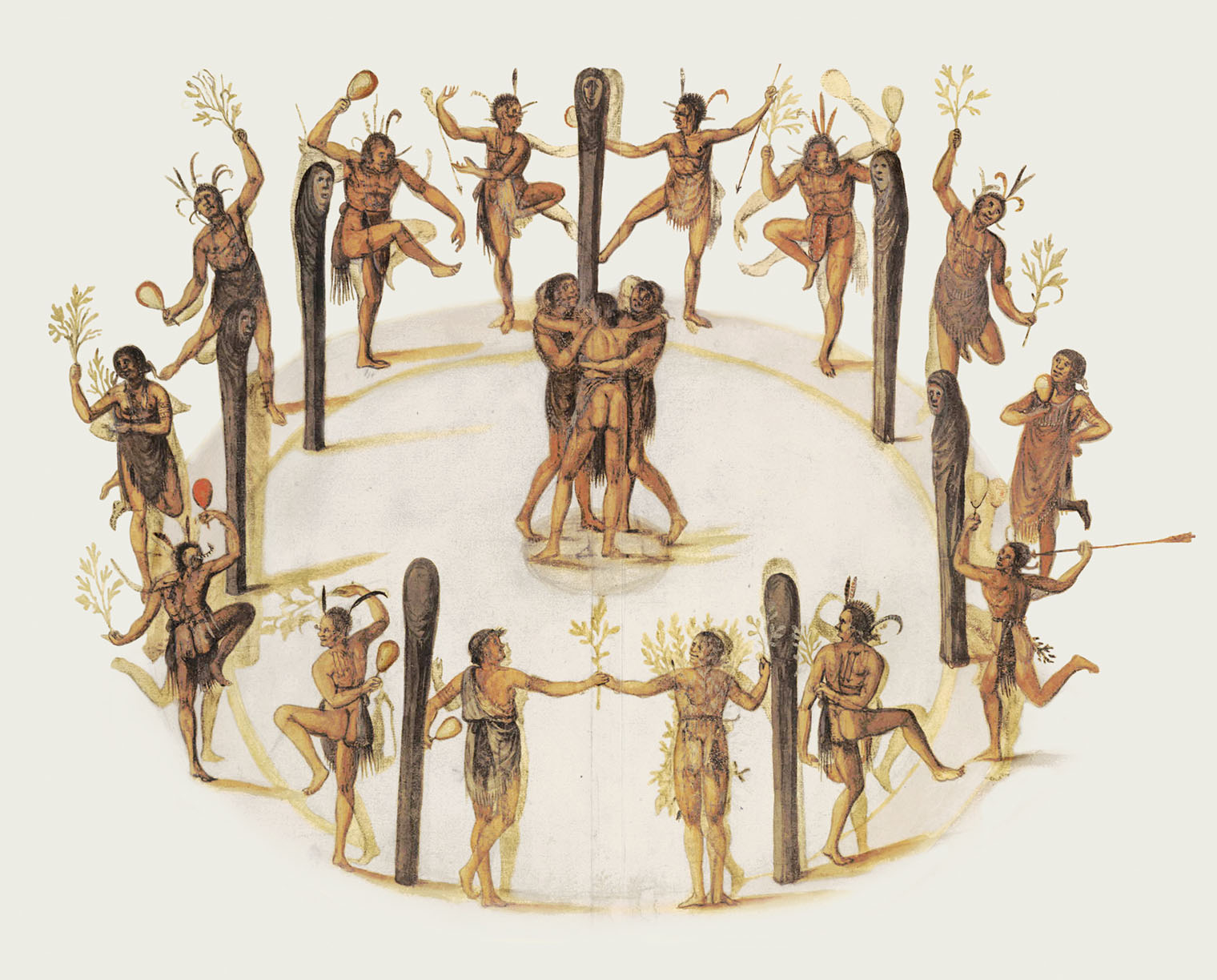
Watercolor by John White of Roanoke Indians

Carolina Algonquian forms a part of the same language group as Powhatan or Virginia Algonquian, a similarly extinct language of the Eastern Algonquian subgroup of the Algonquian language family, itself a member of the Algic language family.

== History ==
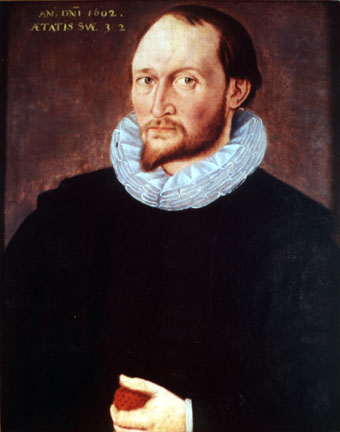
Thomas Harriot translated and learned the Carolina Algonquian language from Wanchese and Manteo.

In 1584 Sir Walter Raleigh had dispatched the first of a number of expeditions to Roanoke Island to explore and eventually settle the New World. Early encounters with the natives were friendly, and, despite the difficulties in communication, the explorers were able to persuade "two of the savages, being lustie men, whose names were Wanchese and Manteo" to accompany them on the return voyage to London, in order for the English people to report both the conditions of the New World that they had explored and what the usefulness of the territory might be to the English.

Once safely delivered to England, the two Indians quickly made a sensation at court. Raleigh's priority, however, was not publicity but rather intelligence about his new land of Virginia. He restricted access to the exotic newcomers, assigning the scientist Thomas Harriot the job of deciphering and learning the Carolina Algonquian language, using a phonetic alphabet of his own invention in order to effect the translation.

== See also ==
- Aquascogoc
- Dasamongueponke
- Powhatan language
- Pamlico
- Secotan
