= Dasamongueponke =

Native American tribe of Secotan people

Total population
- Extinct as a tribe

Regions with significant populations
- North Carolina

Languages
- Carolina Algonquian

Religion
- Tribal religion (historical)

Related ethnic groups
- Secotan, Aquascogoc

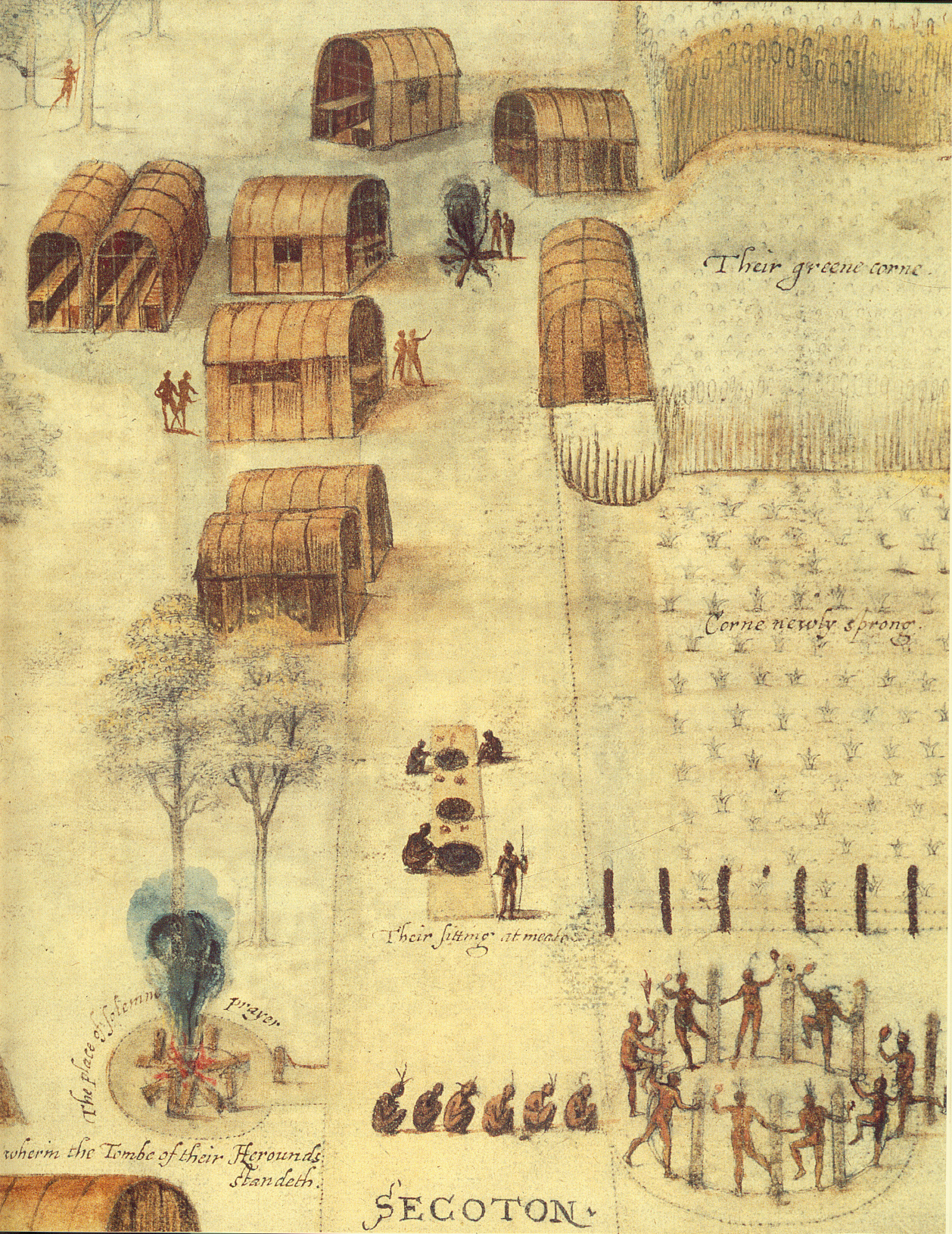
The village of Secoton in Roanoke Island in North Carolina, painted by Governor John White c.1585

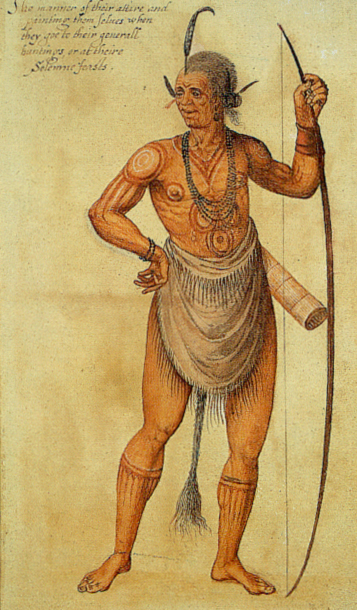
Watercolor painting by Governor John White c.1585 of an Algonkin Indian Chief in what is today North Carolina.

The Dasamongueponke (or Dasamonguepeuk) is the name given to a Native American tribe of Secotan people and also the name of a village encountered by the English during their late 16th century attempts to settle and establish permanent colonies in what is now North Carolina, known at the time as Virginia. Together with the rest of Secotan people they formed a part of the Native American group known as the Carolina Algonquian Indians, and spoke the now extinct Carolina Algonquian language. Dasamongueponke in Carolina Algonquin means "where the extended land is surrounded by water.

== Roanoke colony ==
Sir Richard Grenville was the leader of the 1585 expedition which first attempted to land English settlers on Roanoke island. When war between the Secotan and the English began, King Wingina used the village as his base of operations to attack the colony.

When Grenville left Roanoke, he left behind fifteen men, battle-hardened soldiers. When Governor John White returned in 1587 he searched for the fifteen, but found only bones. White quickly made contact with friendly natives led by Chief Manteo, who explained to him that the lost fifteen had been killed by hostile Secotan, Aquascogoc and Dasamongueponke warriors, choosing a time and place of attack "of great advantage to the savages".

On August 8, 1587, White led a dawn attack on the Dasamongueponkes that went disastrously wrong. White and his soldiers entered the Dasamongueponke village in the morning "so early that it was yet dark", but mistakenly attacked a group of hitherto friendly Indians, killing one and wounding many. "We were deceaved", wrote White in his journal, "for the savages were our friendes". Henceforth relations with the local tribes would steadily deteriorate.

Chief Manteo was granted the title of baron, the Lord of Roanoke and Dasamongueponke - the first peer created by the English in North America.

== Legacy ==
Much of what is known about the lives of the Dasamongueponke and other Algonkin tribes in 16th century North Carolina survives thanks to the watercolor paintings and the journal kept by Governor John White who was commissioned in 1585 to "draw to life" the inhabitants of the New World and their surroundings. During White's time at Roanoke Island, he completed numerous watercolor drawings of the surrounding landscape and native peoples. These works are significant as they are the most informative illustrations of a Native American society of the Eastern seaboard, and predate the first body of "discovery voyage art" created in the late 18th century by the artists who sailed with Captain James Cook. They represent the sole surviving visual record of the native inhabitants of America encountered by England's first settlers.

White's enthusiasm for watercolor was unusual - most contemporary painters preferred to use oil-based paints. White's watercolors would soon become a sensation in Europe and it was not long before the paintings were engraved by the Flemish master engraver Theodore de Bry, and through the medium of print, became widely known and distributed; published in 1590 under the title "America".

== See also ==
- Secotan
- Aquascogoc
- Algonquian peoples
- Pamlico
- Wingina
