= Weapemeoc =

Historical Native American tribe in North Carolina

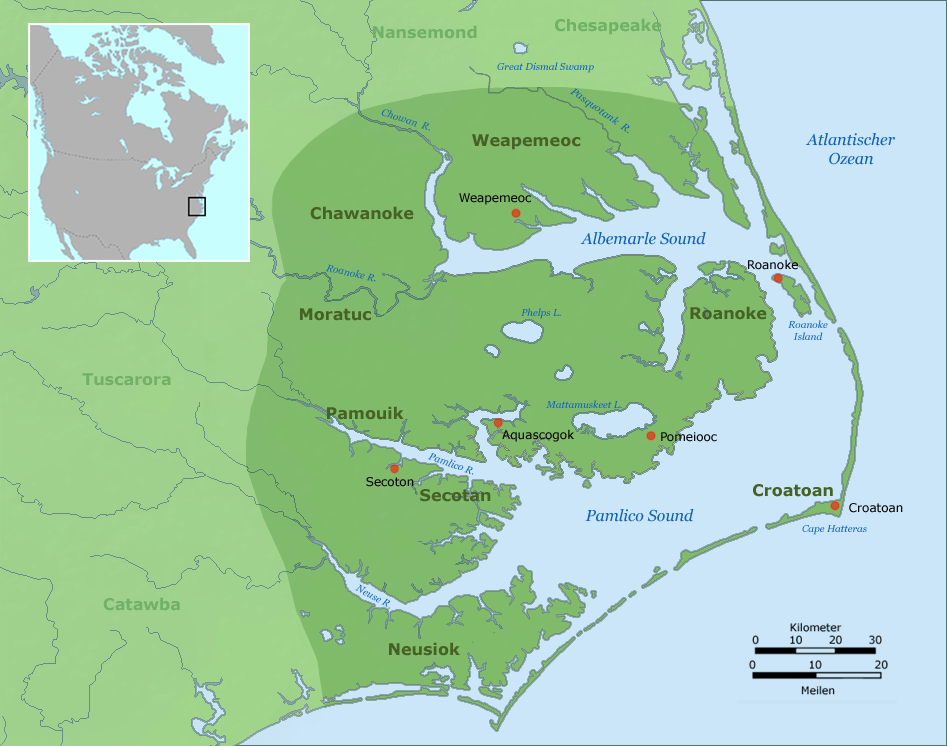
- 16th-century territories of the North Carolina Algonquian, Weapemeoc lived on the north shore of Albemarle Sound

Total population
- extinct as a tribe

Regions with significant populations
- United States, North Carolina

Languages
- Carolina Algonquian language

The Weapemeoc were a small Native American Algonquian speaking tribe from northeastern North Carolina. They lived on the north shore of Albemarle Sound. that was first noted in literature in 1585/1586. At that time, they approximately had 700 to 800 people. They had a maritime culture. However, their culture changed rapidly as European settlers introduced diseases and ultimately forced them from their lands by 1780. There are descendants of the Weapemeoc that still exist today.

== Etymology ==
The original meaning of Weapemeoc has been translated as "where shelter from the wind is sought". Swanton suggested it translated as "People of the First Light," or "People of the Dawn Land," similar to Wabanaki or Wampanoag. The tribe was also commonly referred to as Yeopim as a shortened alternative. This alternative name may have been created by settlers mispronouncing the tribe's name. Many subdivisions, each individually named, comprised the tribe.

== Pre-colonial history ==
The first written record of the Weapemeoc Indians was in 1585. During this time, they had approximately 700 to 800 people. Throughout their existence, they migrated across various North Carolinian counties such as Currituck, Pasquotank and Perquimans and Chowan. Despite their existence only first being noted in 1585, accounts shared by members of the Weapemeoc tribe have enabled historians to reconstruct their history. In 1550, the Weapemeoc Indian tribes were at peace with surrounding tribes and alliances were common. From 1585 to 1586, a map was drawn of Weapemeoc territory along the coastline and rivers. In 1607, the James River area became the battleground between the Weapemeoc Nation, the Powhatan Confederacy and tributary nations.

In 1622, battles continued between neighboring tribes and English settlers. This eventually became known as the Indian Massacre of 1622. Three years later in 1625, a smallpox and measles outbreak killed many Native Indians who did not have natural immunity to such illnesses. In 1650, European presence increased as more and more settlers arrived in North Carolina. With such large numbers of men arriving, the male to female ratio in the Albemarle region of North Carolina was close to 8 to 1. In 1670, British men began marrying local Native American women. This encouraged the exchange of cultures and prompted negotiations to end the constant battles. During negotiations the battles continued and as a result the tribe's population dramatically decrease. By 1700, the Weapemeoc population was thought to only have been 200 people large.

The tribe was surrounded by European settlers and peace did not continue. Many tribal members of the tribe moved to Indiantown.

== Colonization ==
The Weapemeoc Indians lived in what is now northeastern North Carolina. In the early 1580s they experienced a dramatic cultural shift with the arrival of European colonizers. The English established a two-year settlement from 1584 to 1586, and subsequent settlements were established by Spanish, Portuguese and French explorers. The minimal, initial interactions between Weapemeoc and settlers were limited to the shoreline. However, these interactions eventually resulted in conflict with European efforts to displace the tribe from their traditional maritime way of life. While some of the subdivisions of the tribe formed alliances with the settlers, others remained loyal to their traditional roots. Those who regularly interacted with the settlers exchanged their cultural ways of living.

At the dawn of the 18th century, two other Algonquian language–speaking tribes, the Poteskeets and the Yeopim settled in the lands formerly controlled by the Weapemeoc. The English established a reservation for the Yeopim in 1704, but the land was sold in 1739. But the mid-17th century, that "tribe had ceased to exist in any significant numbers in North Carolina."

== Culture ==
The Weapemeoc Indians spoke an Algonquian language.

The Weapemeoc Indians were skilled hunters, farmers, and fishermen. As they lived close to banks and rivers, the tribe had access to freshwater fish, clams, and mussels year-round. Their various fishing instruments ranged from spears, hooks, and nets. Their diets also consisted of seasonal crops such as corn and animals. they hunted by bow and arrow.

Due to the importance of water in their daily lives, many religious rituals and beliefs revolved around maritime activities. For example, in the event of violent waters or potential signs of a storm, the Weapemeoc Indians would throw tobacco and other herbs into the water in hopes of a resolution. However, this maritime culture began to fade with European encroachment.
