= Pamlico =

Extinct Native American tribe from North Carolina

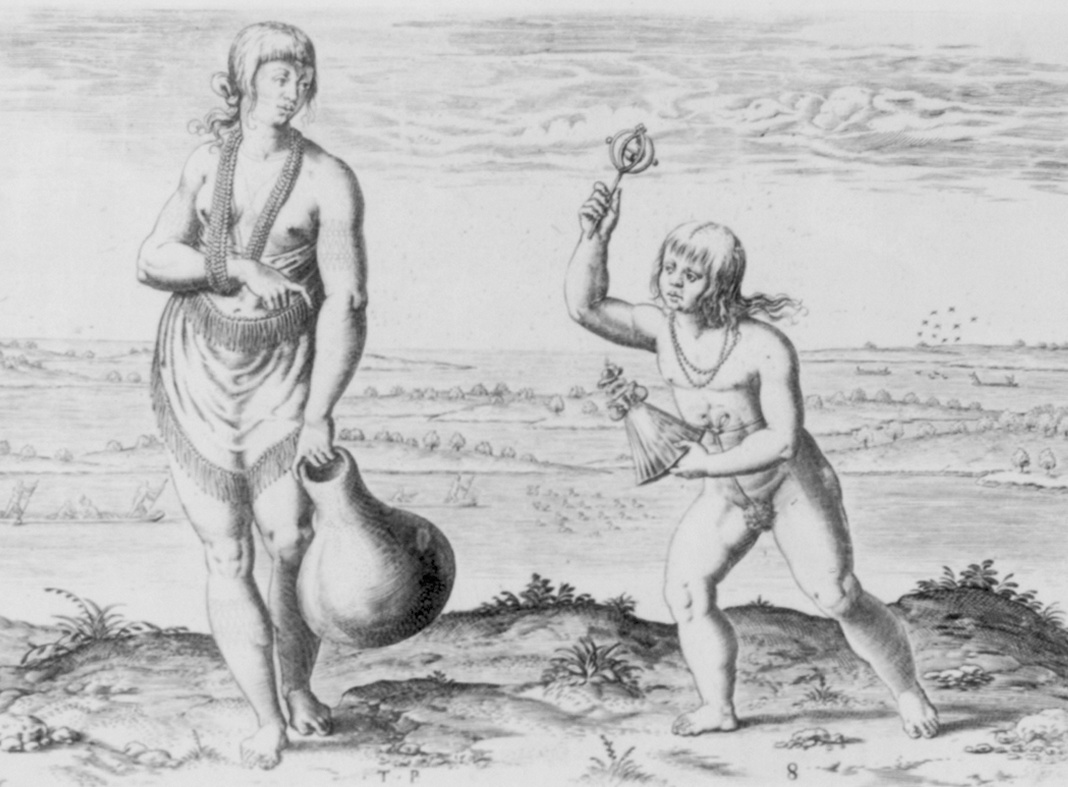
- A noblewoman of Pomeiock

Total population
- Extinct as a tribe

Regions with significant populations
- North Carolina

Languages
- Carolina Algonquian (historical)

Religion
- Tribal religion (historical)

Related ethnic groups
- Chowanoke, Machapunga

The Pamlico (also Pampticough, Pomouik, Pomeiok) were Native Americans of North Carolina. They spoke an Algonquian language also known as Pamlico or Carolina Algonquian.

== Geography ==
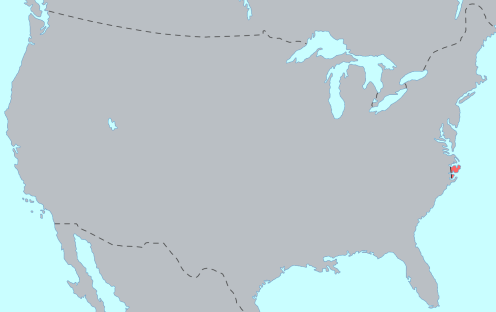
Pamlico

The Pamlico people lived on the Pamlico River in North Carolina. Named after them were Pamlico Sound, the largest sound in North Carolina, and Pamlico County. They are one of the most southerly Algonquian tribes on the Atlantic seaboard and the most southerly ones for which scholars collected a vocabulary.

== History ==
The Raleigh colonists referred to the Pamlico in 1585–86 by the name Pomoui.

=== 17th-century history ===
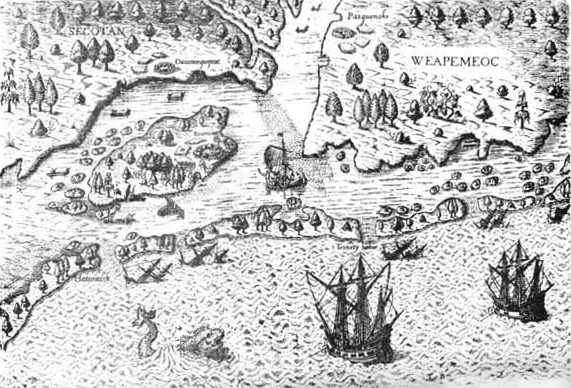
The Arrival of the Englishmen in Virginia, 1607.

In 1696, smallpox, called "A great Mortality", devastated the Pamlico and neighboring Algonquian communities and reduced their populations. In 1701 the explorer John Lawson noted their Algonquian language and vocabulary (Lawson, 1860). By 1710 the Pamlico people were so limited that they lived in a single small village with only 15 "fighting men."

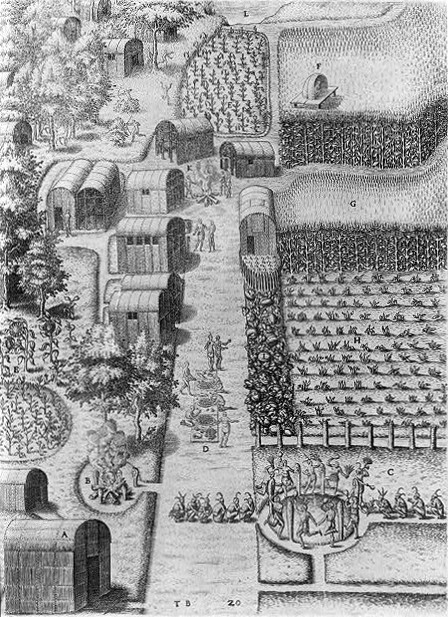
Algonquian village on the Pamlico River estuary

By 1709 the total North Carolina Algonquian population was down to some 600 from at least several thousand at the time of English encounter. The Tuscarora War, 1711–1713, claimed more fatalities among the Algonquian allies than of the Tuscarora. In the late stages, the Tuscarora turned on some of their allies. They likely incorporated some of the Pamlico as slaves. By the end of the century, only a handful of Algonquians remained.

With the decrease in numbers came the loss of tribal lands. Thus, the Weapemeoc people sold their lands on Albemarle Sound in 1660 and 1662 and started to move to the interior. By 1697 they complained against the encroachments of white settlers in their new location. The English assigned a reservation on Bennetts Creek to the Chawanokes (Chowan) before 1700; they reduced its size from 12 to 6 square miles (16 km^{2}) by 1707; the Chowanoke sold off land in 1713. After the Tuscarora War, the Machapunga also were assigned to a reservation. Other groups on the Pamlico Sound joined either the Machapunga or the Tuscarora.

With growing white presence in eastern Carolina, more products of European origin were introduced to the natives. Guns were regularly used instead of bows and arrows during the eighteenth century. Iron hatchets had likewise replaced wooden clubs. English clothes were also widely used by the natives. The Roanoke chief had an English-style house built in 1654.

Other practices persisted through the nineteenth century, including the women making baskets of rushes and silk grass. They decorated them with woven-in life motifs.

=== 18th-century history ===
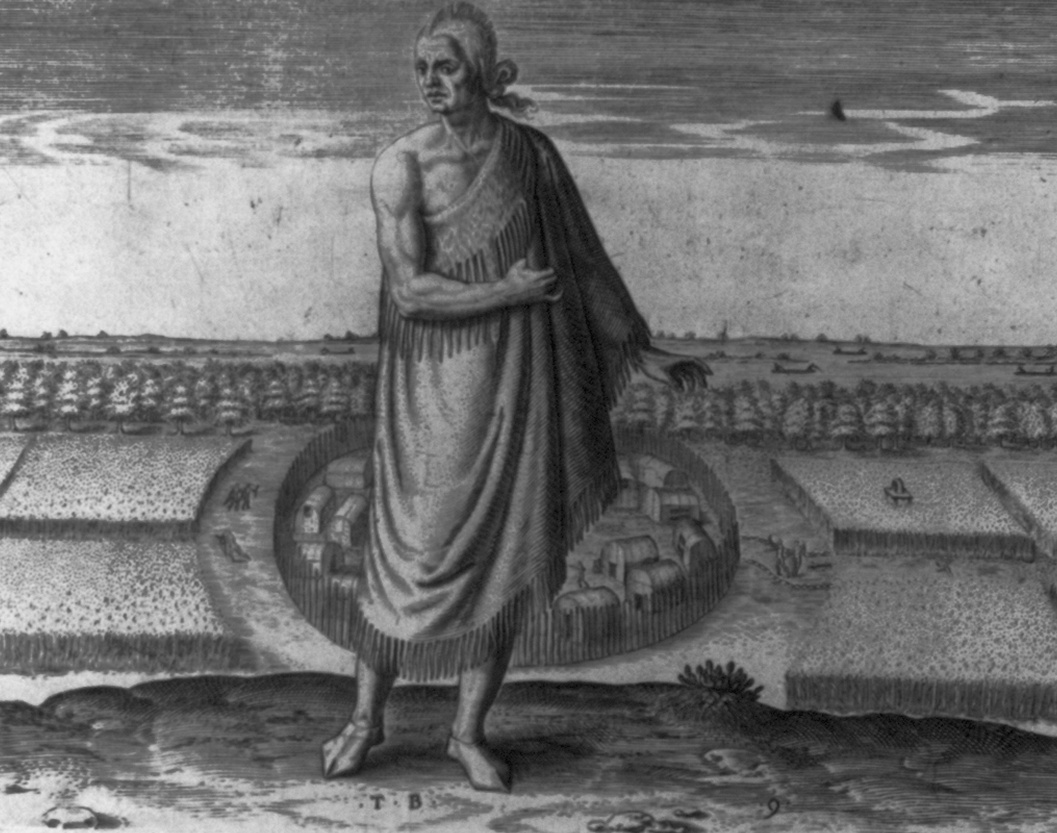
An aged native man from Pomeiock, c. 1590

During the seventeenth century, the Chawanoke were in frequent and partly hostile contact with their Virginia Algonquian neighbors. Their traditional hostilities with the Iroquoian Tuscarora continued during that tribe's war with the whites, when they were actively engaged in expeditions against the hostiles. The Machapungas and other tribes of Pamlico Sound, however, changed their alliances: before 1700 they were still at war with the Tuscarora and Coree, but in 1711 they sided with them against the English colonists. The Hatteras, Weapemeoc (Paspatank or Pasquotank, Poteskeet, Perquimans and Yeopim) peoples were at that time the most acculturated groups; they remained on the side of the English.

Except for the Tuscarora War, there was little open fighting between the Algonquian and English colonists. They had suffered more from epidemics of infectious diseases. Due to small numbers, trade was of little importance.

Sale of strong liquors to the natives was probably the greatest problem created by white traders around 1700. Alcohol was banned from native towns in 1703, but the prohibition was never strictly enforced. Little was done for native education, even though native languages were being replaced by English during the eighteenth century.

A small number of natives were baptized as Christians by Anglican ministers throughout the late seventeenth and the eighteenth centuries. Tribe members starting adopting English names (sometimes as second names to be used occasionally) shortly after 1700. Native medicine men earned money by treating white settlers as well as their own people. Some settlers in North Carolina bought natives as slaves, and others transported them to northern markets. The extent of native servitude and slavery is not accurately known.

== Culture ==
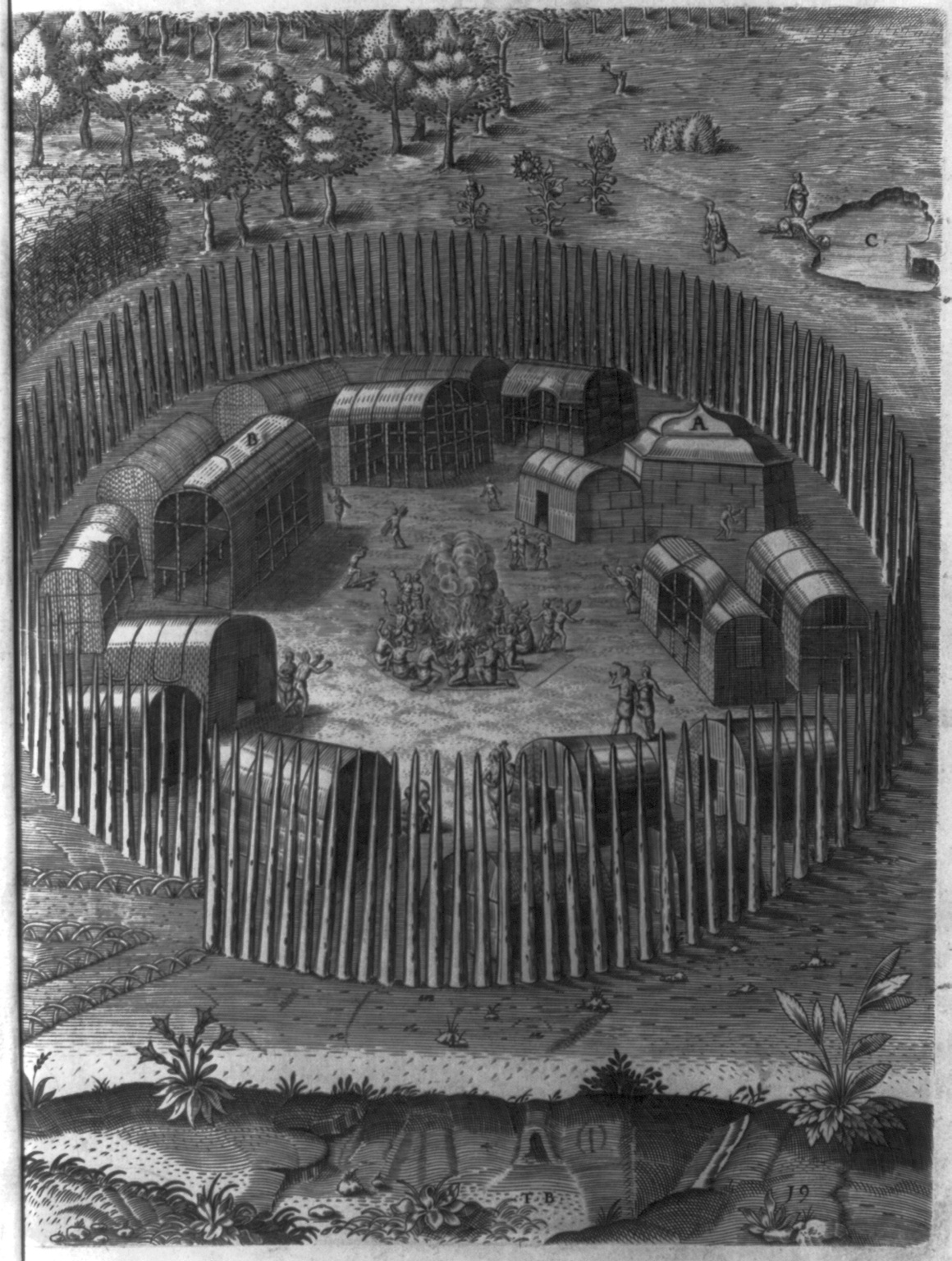
The town of Pomeiock

The Pamlico created distinctive dugout canoes, and traveled extensively. Pamlico artifacts have been found as far away as the North Atlantic.

They ate corn, fish, and other agricultural vegetables and fruits. Besides hunting and agriculture, the coastal groups still relied much on fishing and shellfish gathering, drying the products for preservation on reed hurdles over an open fire or in the sun. Sturgeon was not used as a food by the natives along the coast. Cattle raising is documented for the Paspatanks around 1700 (Lawson 1709). The Tuscarora War disturbed the economic balance of many of the Algonquian groups: the fields of the Machapunga and their allies were destroyed by English colonists. The Hatteras were prevented from planting by their enemies, and in 1714–1715 needed supplies from the colonial authorities to survive.

Political organization with hereditary chiefdoms was still functioning around 1700. Chiefs' corpses were buried in the temples as before. Commoners could purchase the right of burial in the temple precinct with enough money. Shell beads (wampum) served as money, for example, to compensate victims of crimes.

=== Ceremonies ===
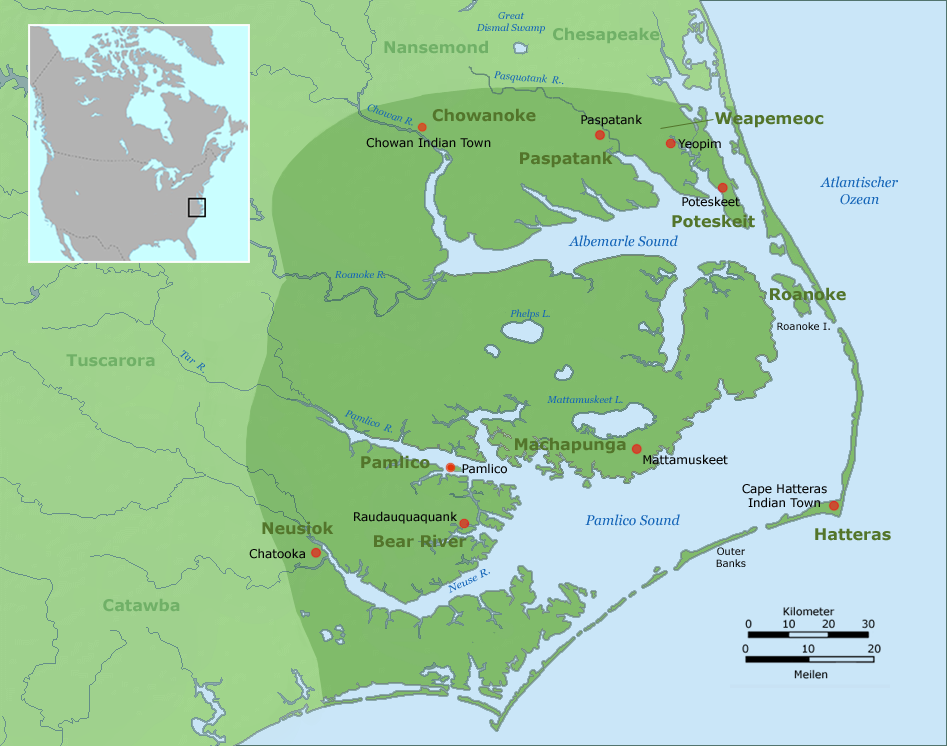
Distribution of Carolina Algonquian speaking peoples

Marriage restrictions that prohibited marrying first cousins made it difficult to find mates within rapidly shrinking communities. Resulting marriages into other tribes certainly strengthened intertribal bonds.

The huskenaw rite appears to have been used as an initiation for both boys and girls. It was held around Christmas and lasted for five or six weeks, during which the adolescents were separated in a special building outside the village. There were some colonial reports that two of 50 families among the Machapungas practiced male circumcision, but this was not typical of the Native Americans.

== See also ==
- Algonquian languages
- Algonquian peoples
- Roanoke tribe
