= John White (colonist and artist) =

English governor of the Roanoke Colony (1587 to 1590)

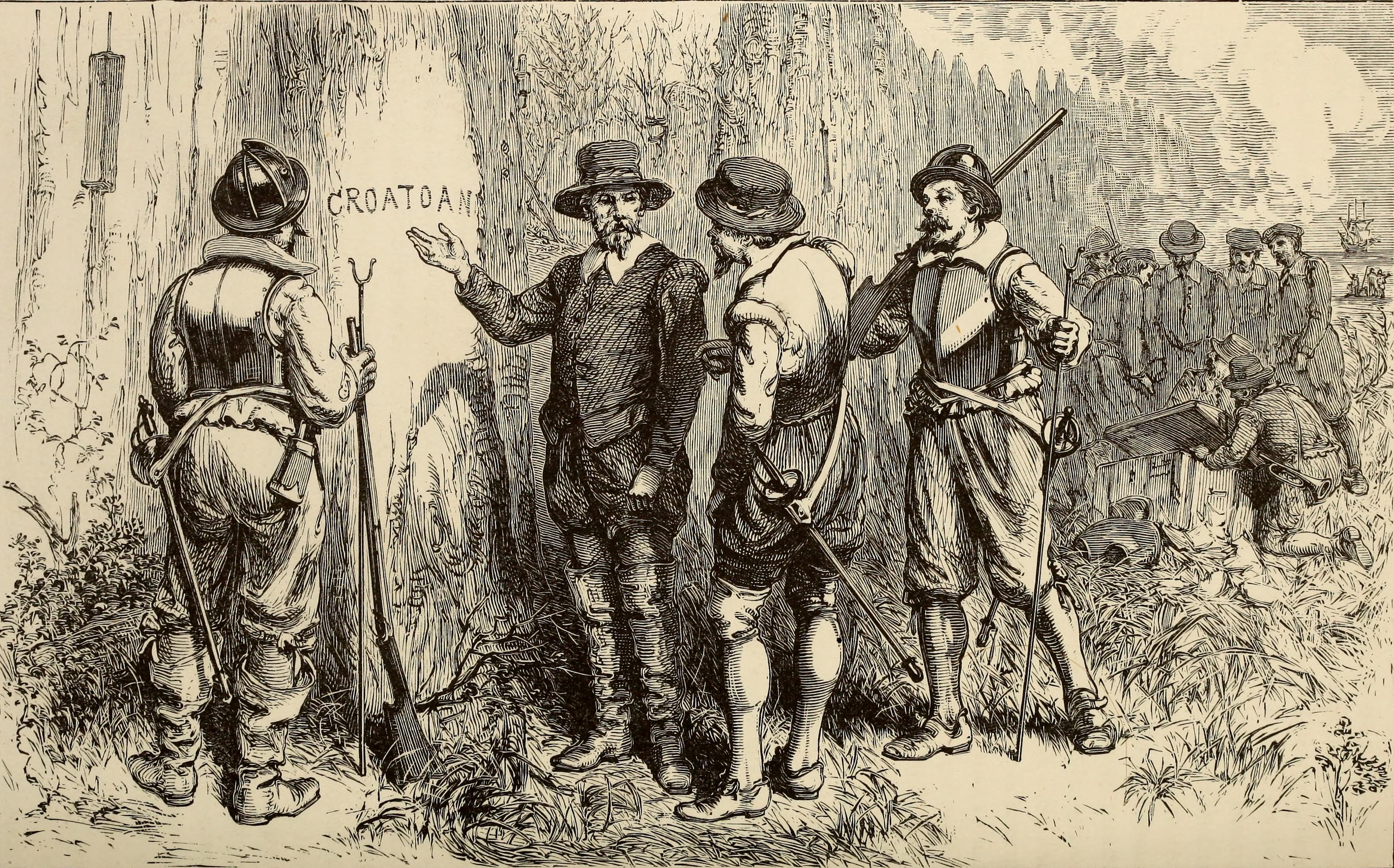
- The return of Governor White to the "Lost Colony" as imagined by artists in 1876
- Born: c. 1539; England
- Died: c. 1593-1606 (aged c. 54-67)
- Occupations: Colonial governor; explorer; artist; mapmaker
- Spouse: Tomasyn Cooper (m. 1566)
- Children: Eleanor and 1 son
- Patrons: Sir Walter Raleigh

John White (c. 1539–c. 1606) was an English colonial governor, explorer, artist, and cartographer. White was among those who sailed with Richard Grenville in the first attempt to colonise Roanoke Island in 1585, acting as artist and mapmaker to the expedition. He would most famously briefly serve as the governor of the second attempt to found Roanoke Colony on the same island in 1587 and discover the colonists had mysteriously vanished.

During his time at Roanoke Island, he made several watercolour sketches of the surrounding landscape and the native Algonquian peoples. These works are significant as they are the most informative illustrations of a Native American society of the Eastern seaboard; all of the surviving original watercolours are now preserved in the print room of the British Museum.

In 1587, White became governor of Sir Walter Raleigh's failed attempt at a permanent settlement on Roanoke Island, known to history as the "Lost Colony". This was the earliest effort to establish a permanent English colony in the New World. White's granddaughter Virginia Dare was the first English child born in North America. In late 1587, White returned to England for supplies. The return expedition was delayed due to various reasons, including the Spanish Armada. Governor White finally returned to Roanoke Island in August 1590, but found the colony had been long deserted.

After the failure of the colony, White retired to Raleigh's estates in Ireland, reflecting upon the "evils and unfortunate events" which had ruined his hopes in the New World, though never giving up hope that his daughter and granddaughter were still alive.

== Early life ==
John White's exact date of birth is unknown but it seems likely he was born sometime in the 1530s–1540s. In 1587, the arms granted to him were those of the White family of Truro, Cornwall. So, White was Cornish in some capacity, though the place of his birth is unclear. White was parishioner of St Martin, Ludgate in London in the late 1560s. In 1566, he married Tomasyn Cooper; with whom he had a son, Thomas, who died young, and a daughter, Eleanor. Little is known of White's training as an artist but it is possible that he apprenticed as an illustrator under a London master.

== Career ==
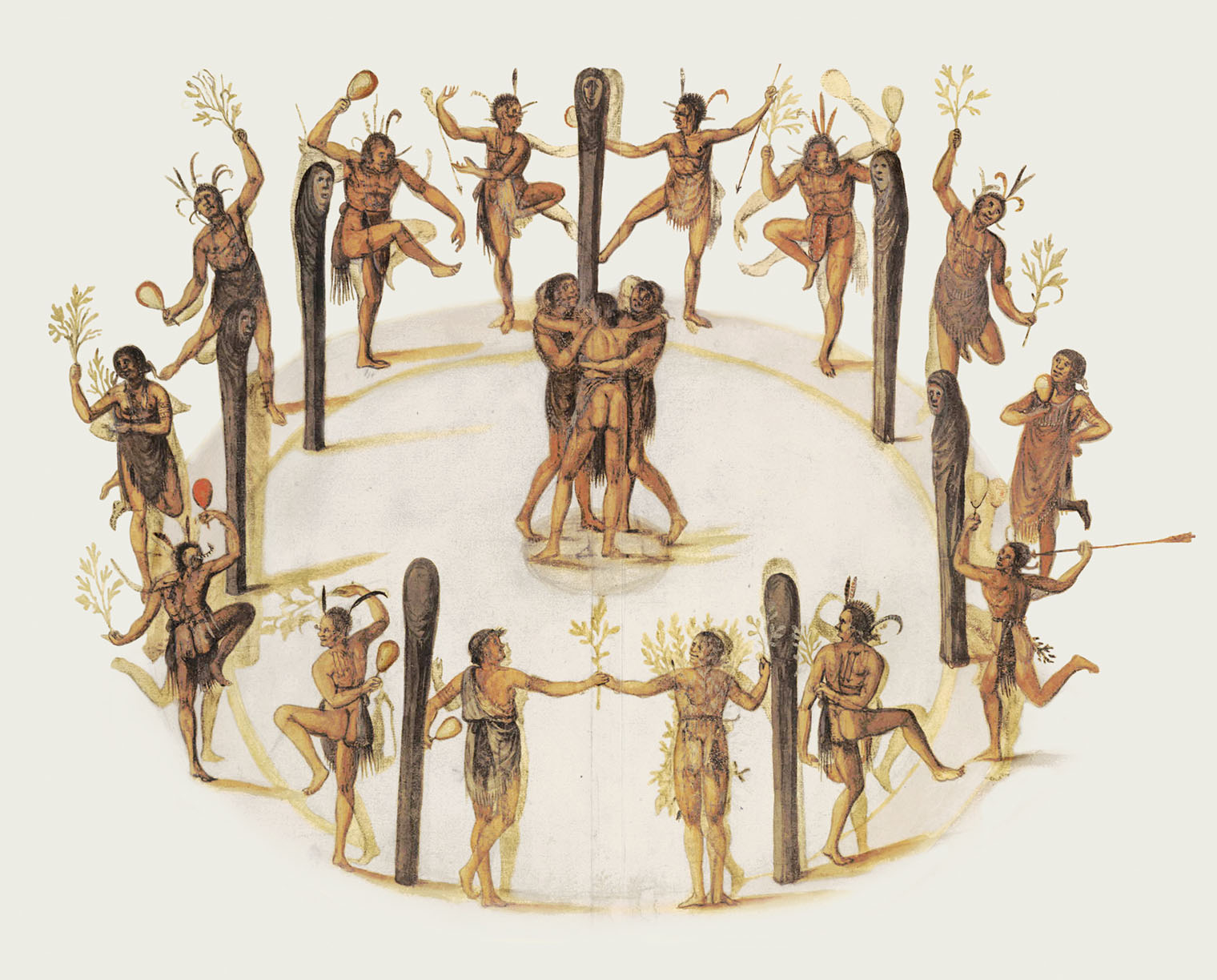
Watercolour by John White of Roanoke Indians

In the late sixteenth century, efforts to establish an English colony in the New World began to gain momentum, and White soon became an enthusiastic supporter. In 1577, White may have accompanied Martin Frobisher to search for precious metals and a northwest passage to Asia on his Baffin Island and Greenland expeditions. Despite this, White was not mentioned by name. His drawings from this period were of the lands and people encountered on the voyage. In 1585, White accompanied the expedition led by Sir Ralph Lane to attempt to found the first English colony in North America. White was sent by Sir Walter Raleigh as Sir Richard Grenville's artist-illustrator on his first voyage to the New World; working closely with the scientist Thomas Harriot, he served as mapmaker and artist to the expedition, which encountered considerable difficulties and returned to England in 1586.

== Gentleman artist ==
In 1585, White had been commissioned to "draw to life" the inhabitants of the New World and their surroundings. During White's time at Roanoke Island, he completed numerous watercolour drawings of the surrounding landscape and native peoples. These works are significant as they are the most informative illustrations of a Native American society of the Eastern Seaboard, and predate the first body of "discovery voyage art" created in the late 18th century by the artists who sailed with Captain James Cook. They represent the sole-surviving visual record of the Native American inhabitants encountered by England's first settlers.

White's enthusiasm for watercolour was unusual – most contemporary painters preferred to use oil-based paints. White's watercolours would soon become a sensation in Europe; it was not long before the watercolours were engraved by the Flemish master engraver Theodor de Bry. Through the medium of print, the illustrations became widely known and distributed; they were published in 1590 under the title America.

== Governor of the Roanoke colony ==
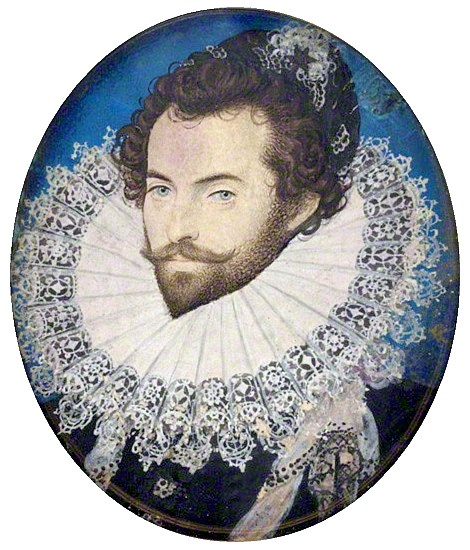
White's patron, Sir Walter Raleigh

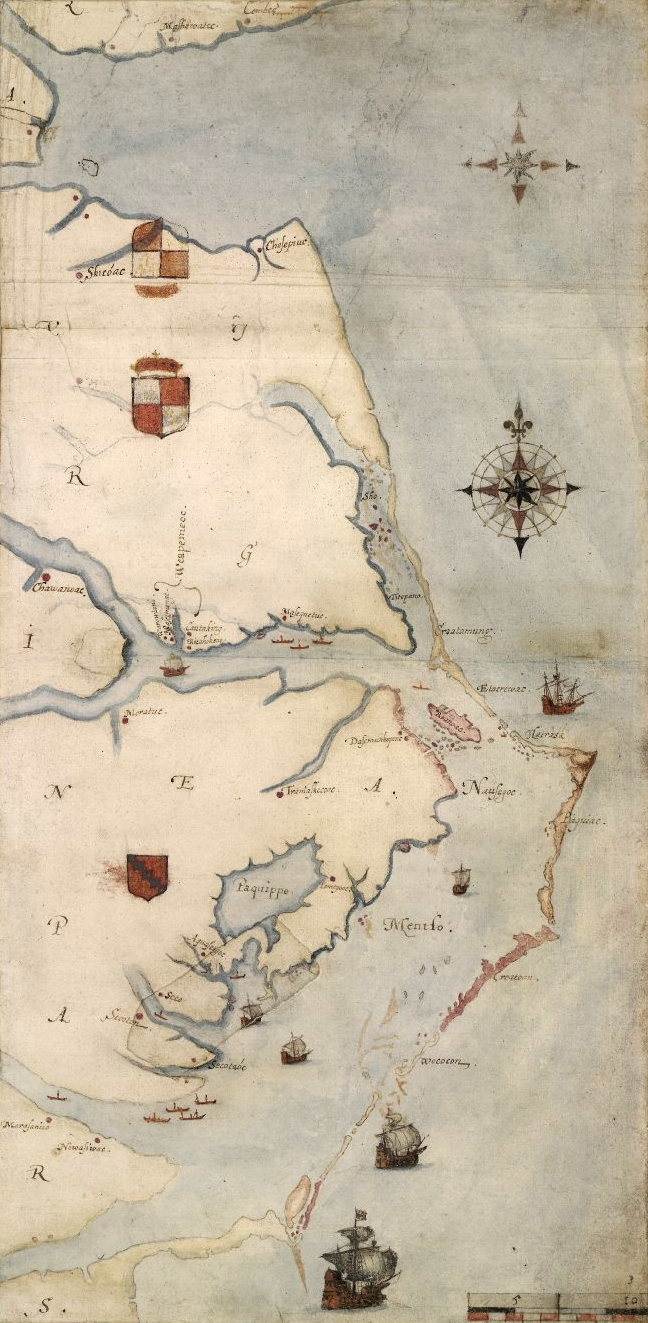
White's sketch of the Roanoke area c. 1584

After Lane's colonists returned to England in 1586, Sir Walter Raleigh, who held the land patent for the proposed English colony of Virginia, tasked White with the job of organising a new settlement in the Chesapeake Bay area, one which would be self-sustaining and which would include women and children. During 1586, White was able to persuade 113 prospective colonists to join Raleigh's expedition, including his daughter Eleanor and his son-in-law Ananias Dare, recently married at St Bride's Church in Fleet Street. His efforts did not go unrewarded; on 7 January 1587, Raleigh named "John White of London Gentleman, to be the chief Governor" of the new colony. White, with thirteen others, were incorporated under the name of "The Governor and Assistants of the Cities of Raleigh of Virginia".

=== Arrival at Roanoke ===
Coat of Arms of Governor John White

In May 1587, White's colonists sailed for Virginia in the Lion. They were guided by the Portuguese navigator Simon Fernandes, the same pilot who had led the 1585 expedition and who was given by his fellow sailors the unhappy nickname of "the swine." The settlers' chosen destination was not Roanoke but the Chesapeake Bay. But, upon reaching Roanoke in late July, and allowing the colonists to disembark, Fernandez refused to let White's men re-board the ship.

According to White's journal, Fernandez's deputy "called to the sailors in the pinesse, charging them not to bring any of the planters [settlers] back again, but leave them on the island." Faced with what amounted to a mutiny by his navigator, White appears to have backed down and acquiesced in this sudden change of plan. Despite the governor's protests, Fernandez held that "summer was farre spent [summer was almost over], wherefore hee would land all the planters in no other place."

This second colony at Roanoke set about repairing the structures left behind in 1585. They also searched for the fifteen men left behind by the previous expedition, but found only bones. From an early stage there were tensions with the local Algonquian Indians, though initially things went well. White quickly made contact with friendly natives led by Chief Manteo, who explained to him that the lost fifteen had been killed by hostile Secotan, Aquascogoc, and Dasamongueponke warriors, choosing a time and place of attack "of great advantage to the savages."

On 8 August 1587, White led a dawn attack on the Dasamongueponkes that went disastrously wrong. White and his soldiers entered the Dasamongueponke village in the morning "so early that it was yet dark," but mistakenly attacked a group of hitherto friendly Indians, killing one and wounding many. "We were deceived," wrote White in his journal, "for the savages were our friends." Henceforth, relations with the local tribes would steadily deteriorate.

=== Virginia Dare ===
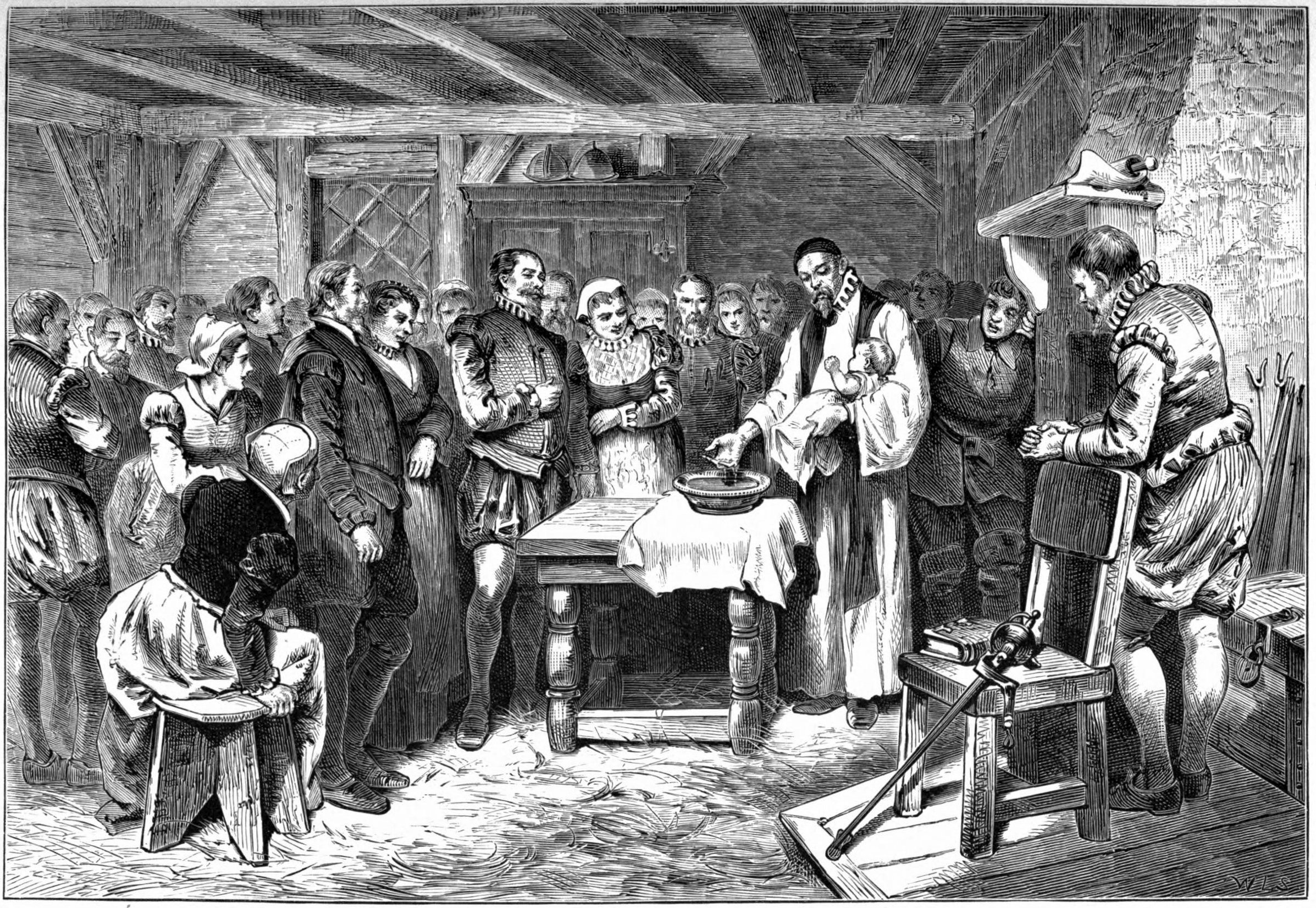
Baptism of Virginia Dare, wood-engraving, 1880

On 18 August 1587, there was happier news – White became a grandfather. "Eleanor, daughter to the governor and wife to Ananias Dare, one of the assistants, was delivered of a daughter in Roanoke." The child was healthy and "was christened there the Sunday following, and because this child was the first Christian born in Virginia, she was named Virginia."

=== White's return to England ===
However, the colonists' food supplies soon began to grow short, and in late 1587 the settlers pressed White to return to England "for the better and sooner obtaining of supplies, and other necessaries." Because the colony had been deposited in Roanoke rather than the Chesapeake area, supply ships from England ignorant of Fernandez's change of plan would most likely not land in Roanoke at all, and the settlement might not survive the coming winter. White was reluctant to abandon his colony, anxious that his enemies in England "would not spare to slander [him] falsely" should he leave, and worried that his "stuff and goods might be spoiled and most of it pilfered away." Eventually the colonists agreed to stand surety for White's belongings and he was prevailed upon to sail, "much against his will," to seek help.

Misfortune struck White's return to England from the beginning. The anchor of the flyboat on which White was quartered could not be raised, and many crew members were severely injured during the attempt. Worse, their journey home was delayed by "scarce and variable winds" followed by "a storm at the north-east," and many sailors starved or died of scurvy. On 16 October 1587 the desperate crew, at last, landed in Smerwicke, in the west of Ireland, and White was finally able to make his way back to Southampton.

=== Spanish Armada ===
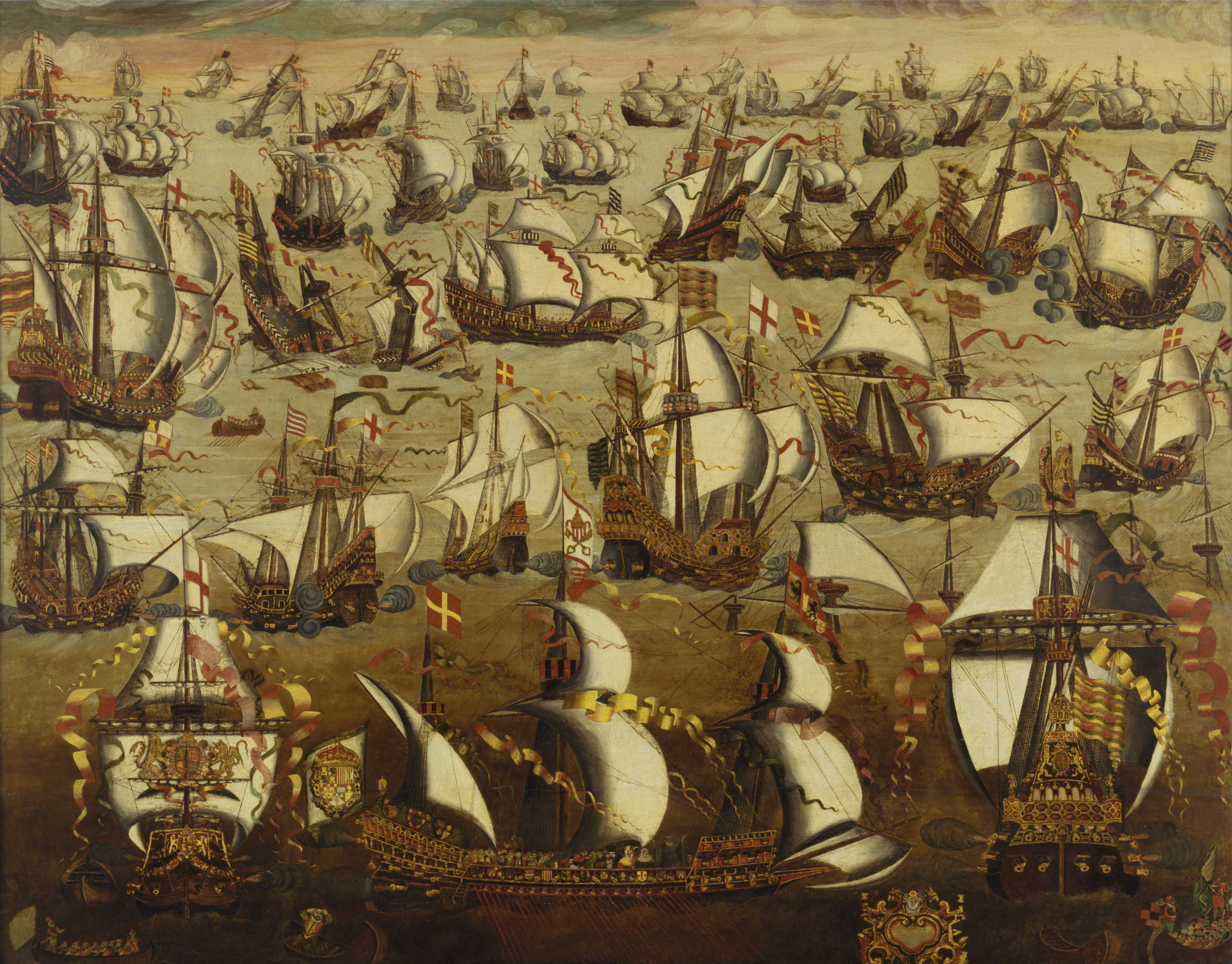
The invincible Spanish Armada, later proved to be vincible

Further bad news awaited White on his return to England. Just two weeks previously Queen Elizabeth I had issued a general "stay of shipping," preventing any ships from leaving English shores. The reason was the "invincible fleetes made by the King of Spain, joined with the power of the Pope, for the invading of England" – the Spanish Armada. White's patron Sir Walter Raleigh attempted to provide ships to rescue the colony but he was over-ruled by the Queen.

=== Brave and the Roe ===
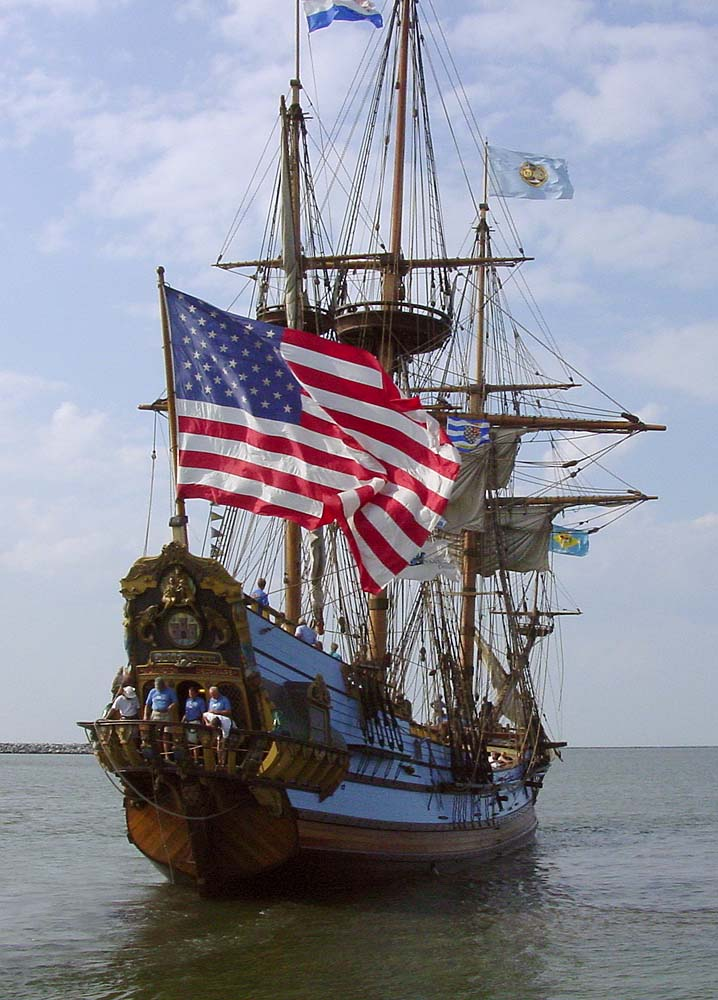
A modern replica of an early 17th-century pinnace

In early 1588, White was able to scrape together a pair of small pinnaces, the Brave and the Roe, which were unsuitable for military service and could be spared for the expedition to Roanoke. Unluckily for White, they were barely suited for the Atlantic crossing and the governor endured further bad luck as the ships were intercepted by French pirates, who "playd extreemely upon us with their shot," hitting White (to his great embarrassment) "in the side of the buttoke." White and his crew escaped to England with their lives, but "they robbed us of all our victuals, powder, weapons and provision," and the journey to Virginia had to be abandoned. By this stage White appears to have formed the view that he was born under "an unlucky star."

=== Return to the "Lost Colony" ===
Finally, in March 1590, with the immediate threat of a Spanish invasion by now abated, Raleigh was able to equip White's rescue expedition. Two ships, the Hopewell and the Moonlight set sail for Roanoke. The return journey was prolonged by extensive privateering and several sea battles, and White's eventual landing at the Outer Banks was further imperilled by poor weather. The landing was hazardous and was beset by bad conditions and adverse currents. During the landing on Roanoke, of the mariners who accompanied White, "seven of the chiefest were drowned."

Governor White finally reached Roanoke Island on 18 August 1590, his granddaughter's (Virginia Dare) third birthday, but he found his colony had been long deserted. The buildings had collapsed and "the houses [were] taken downe." The few clues about the colonists' whereabouts included the letters "CRO" carved into a tree, and the word "CROATOAN" carved on a post of the fort. Croatoan was the name of a nearby island (likely modern-day Hatteras Island) and of a local tribe of Native Americans. Roanoke Island was originally not a planned location for the colony and the idea of moving elsewhere had been discussed. Before the Governor's departure, he and the colonists had agreed that a message would be carved into a tree if they had moved and would include an image of a Maltese Cross if the decision was made by force. White found no such cross and was hopeful that his family were still alive.

True to their word, the colonists had looked after White's belongings, which had been carefully buried and hidden. However, local Indians had looted the hiding place, and White found "about the place many of my things spoyled and broken, and my books torne from the covers, the frames of some of my pictures and mappes rotten and spoyled with rayne, and my armour almost eaten through with rust."

Due to the weather, which "grew to be fouler and fouler," White had to abandon the search of adjacent islands for the colonists. The ship's captain had already lost three anchors and could not afford the loss of another. White returned to Plymouth, England, on 24 October 1590.

The loss of the colony was a personal tragedy for White, from which he never fully recovered. He would never return to the New World, and in a letter to Richard Hakluyt he wrote that he must hand over the fate of the colonists and his family "to the merciful help of the Almighty, whom I most humbly beseech to helpe and comfort them."

== Later life ==
Little is known of White's life after the failure of the Roanoke Colony. He lived in Plymouth, and also owned a house at Newtown, Kylmore (Kilmore, County Cork), Ireland. He appears to have been in Ireland living on the estates of Sir Walter Raleigh, making maps of land for Raleigh's tenants, and reflecting upon the "evils and unfortunate events" which had ruined his hopes in the New World, though never giving up hope that his daughter and granddaughter were still alive.

White's year of death is unclear and not widely known. The last surviving document related to White is a letter he wrote from Ireland in 1593 to the publisher of the prints of his Roanoke drawings. However, a record from May 1606 that Bridget White, who was appointed estate administrator for her brother "John White", may refer to him. Furthermore, another two documents give his year of death as 1606.

== Legacy ==
White is chiefly remembered today for his watercolours, which represent a unique record of 16th-century Algonquian society. All of White's surviving works are now in the print room of the British Museum.

In 2007, the British Museum placed the entire group of John White's watercolours on public display under the collection, "A New World: England's First View of America." There are more than seventy watercolours in the travelling exhibit. There were plans to show the collection at the North Carolina Museum of History.

The World War II Liberty ship SS John White was named in his honor.

== In popular culture ==
- In the sixth season of American Horror Story, White is mentioned in the third episode. Kathy Bates portrays Tomasyn "The Butcher" White, his fictional wife and regent-governor while he is away getting supplies from England. Wes Bentley portrays John and Tomasyn's son, Ambrose.

== Gallery ==
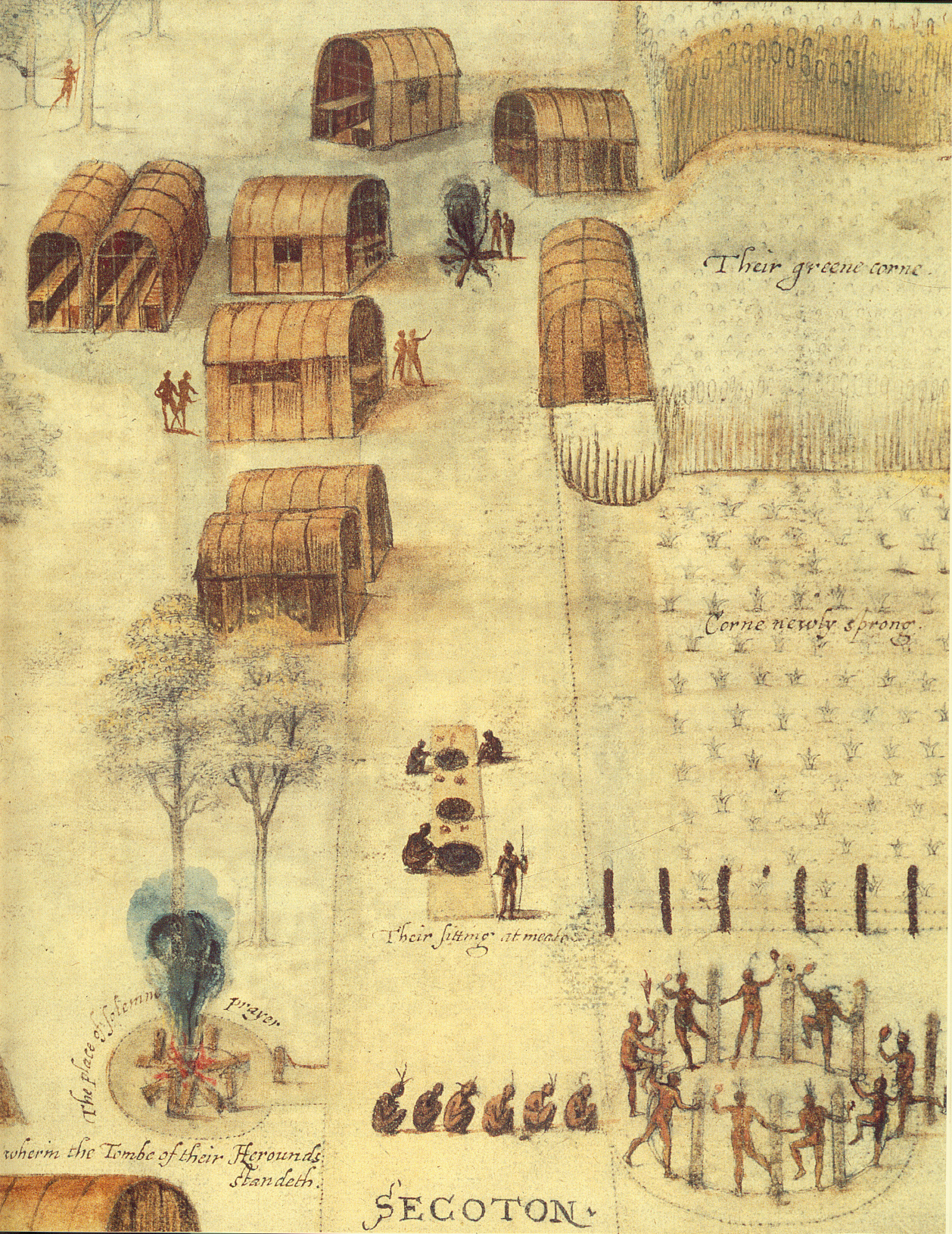
Watercolour painted by John White

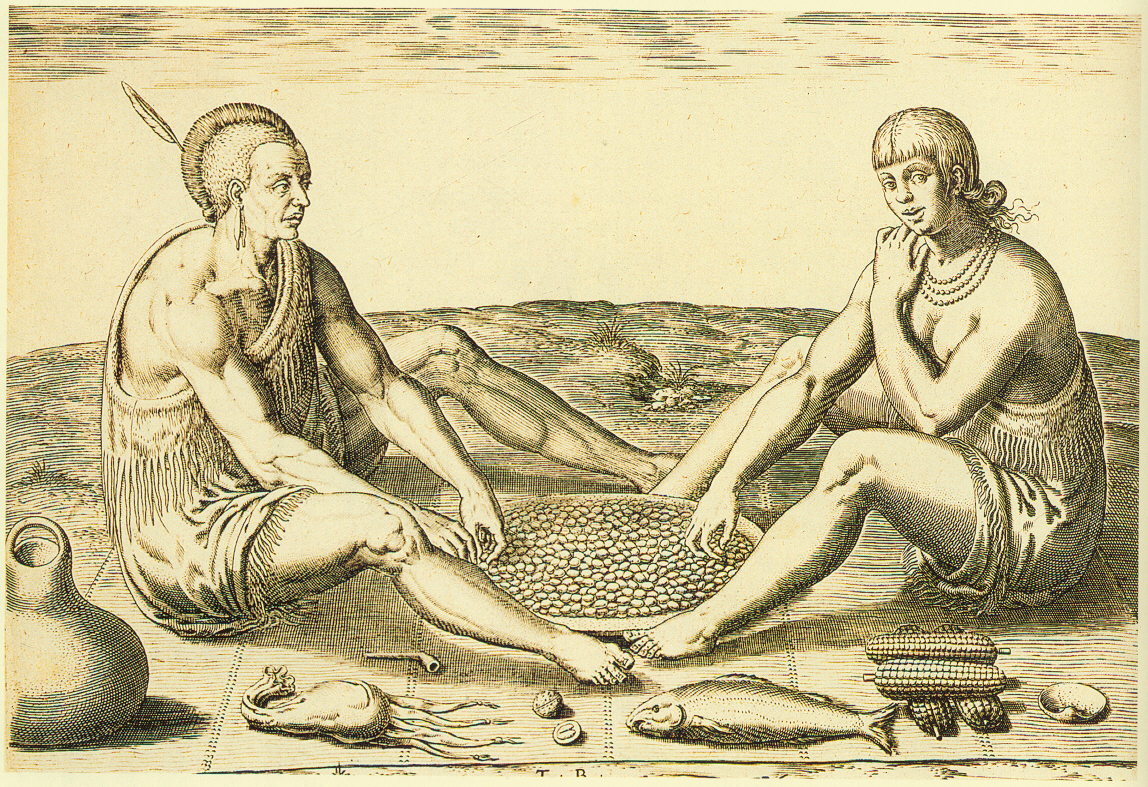
Engraving by Theodor de Bry after a watercolour painted by John White

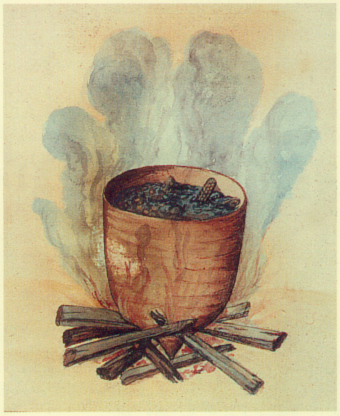
Clay pot of North Carolina Algonquians used for boiling.

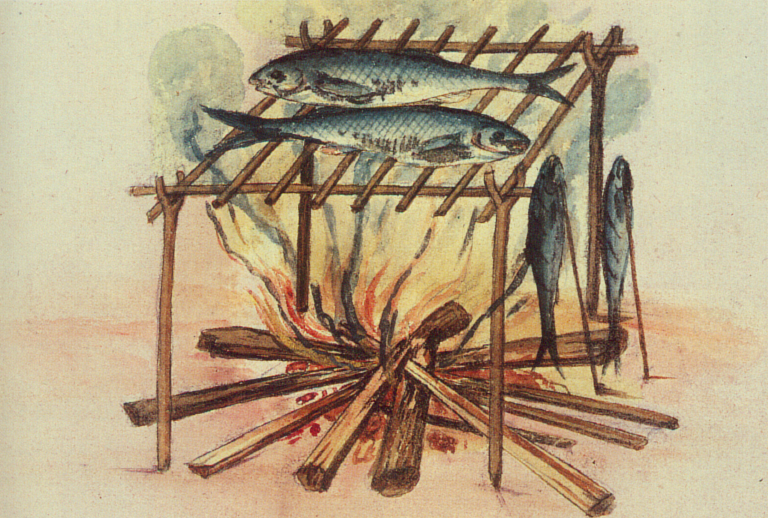
Equipment for curing fish used by the North Carolina Algonquians.

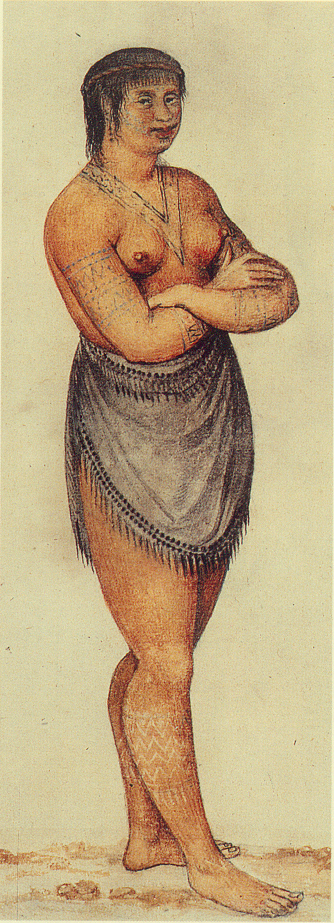
Woman of the Secotan-Indians in North Carolina. Watercolour painted by John White in 1585.

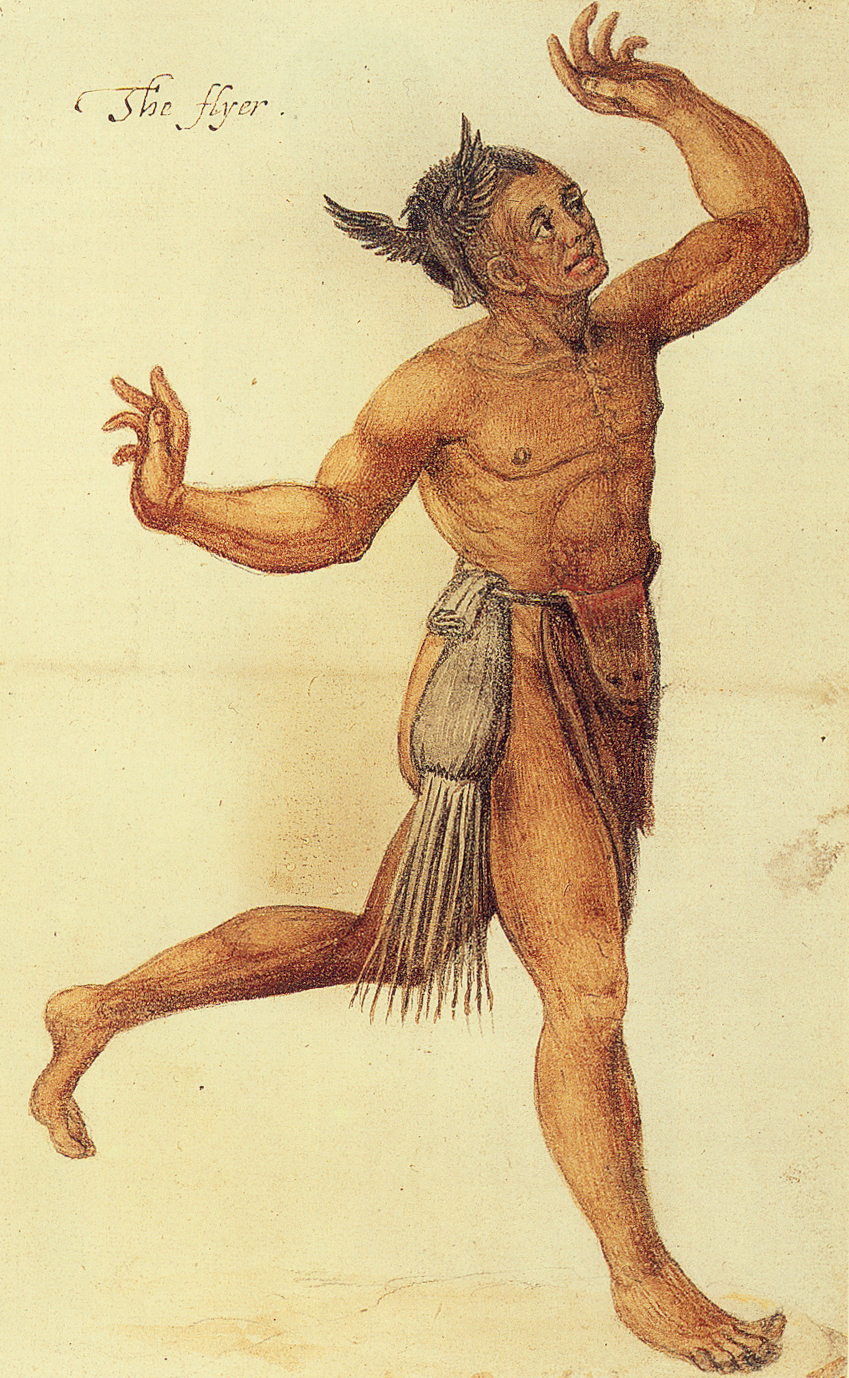
Man of the Secotan Indians in North Carolina. Watercolour painted by John White in 1585.

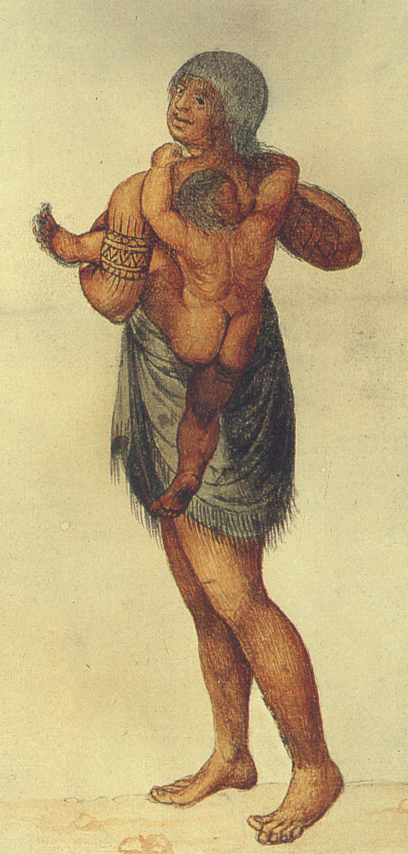
Mother and child of the Secotan Indians in North Carolina. Watercolour painted by John White in 1585.

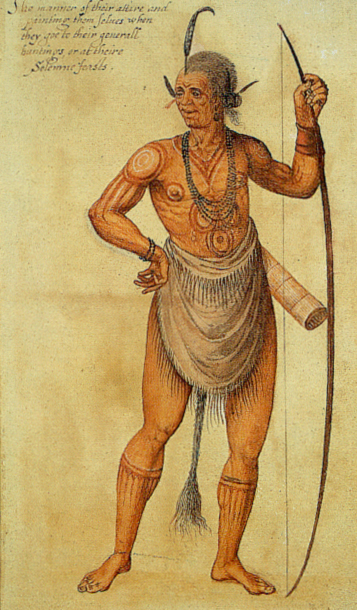
Warrior of the Secotan Indians in North Carolina. Watercolour painted by John White in 1585.

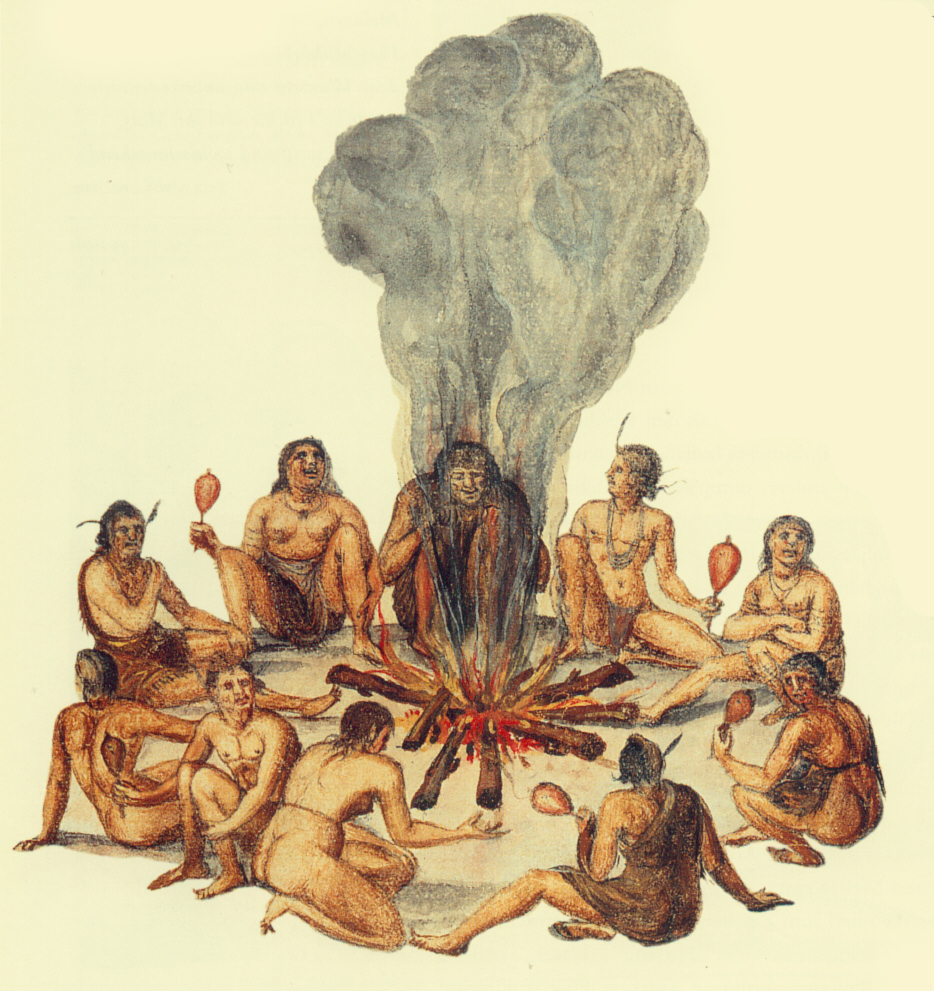
Ceremony of Secotan warriors in North Carolina. Watercolour painted by John White in 1585.

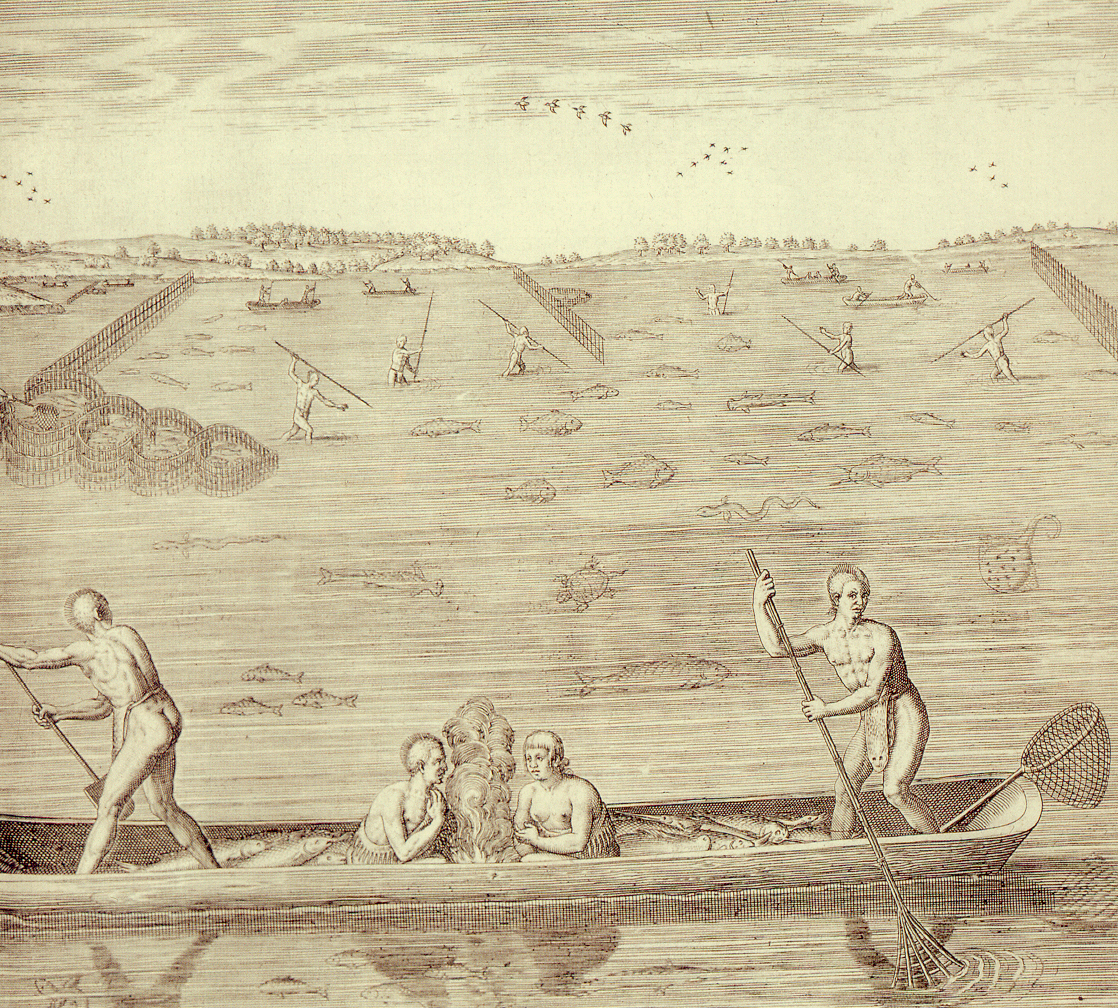
Engraving by Theodor de Bry after a watercolour painted by John White

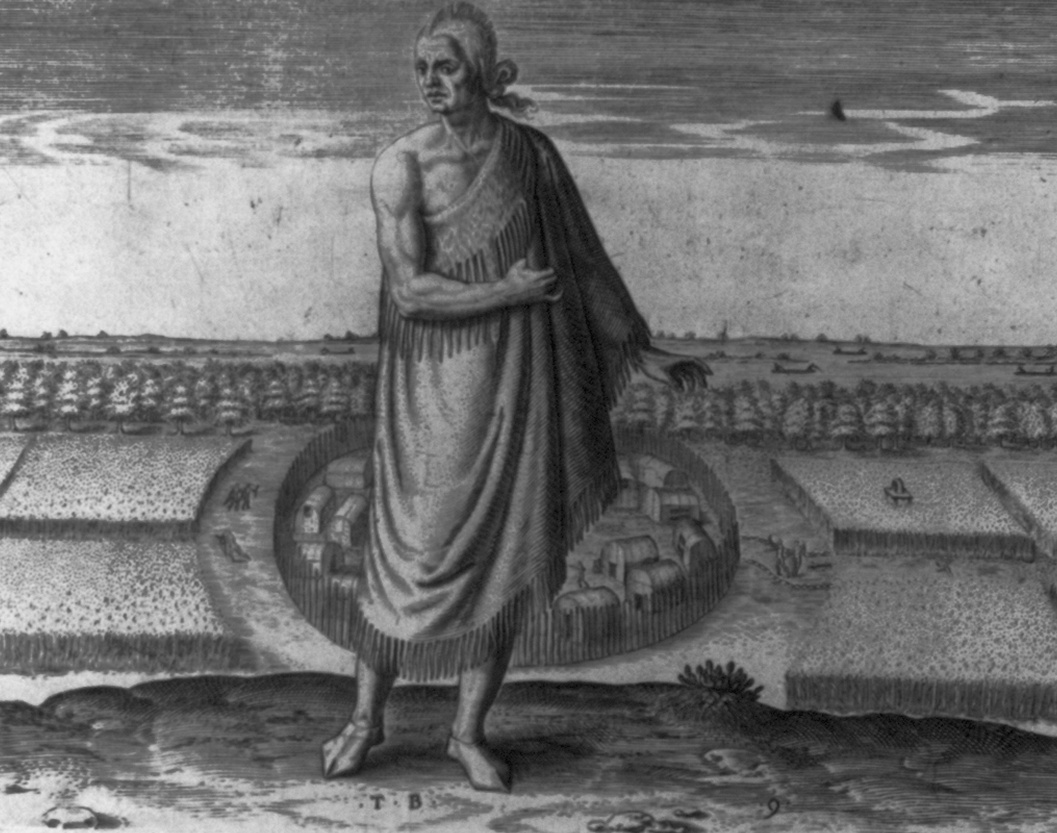
An aged Native man from Pomeiock, full-length portrait, facing front, wearing winter garment; landscape scene with village in the background.

== See also ==
- List of colonial governors of North Carolina
- List of colonial governors of Virginia
- List of colonists at Roanoke

Government offices
Preceded by Sir Ralph Lane as Governor of Roanoke (Virginia)	Governor of Raleigh (Virginia); 1587–1590	Office abolished
