= Manteo (Native American leader) =

First Amerindian to be baptized into Anglicanism and visit England

Croatan, Algonquian peoples leader

Personal details
- Born: c. 1564 now North Carolina, United States
- Died: c. 1590 (aged c. 26)
- Known for: Roanoke Colony, travels to England, co-operation with English settlement

Manteo (c. 1564 – c. 1590) was a Croatan leader and who befriended the English explorers who landed at Roanoke Island in 1584. Though commonly characterized as a Croatan chief, Manteo's mother was actually the principal leader (Weroansqua) of the tribe. Her office would not have automatically passed down to her children as many contemporary Englishmen at the time may have assumed.

In 1585 English settlers returned to establish the Roanoke Colony, arriving too late in the year to plant crops and harvest food, and Manteo helped the colonists make it through the harsh winter. He traveled to England on two occasions, in 1584 and 1585. After staying there, he was among those who sailed for the New World in 1587 along with Governor John White and his colonists, who founded the failed settlement later known as "The Lost Colony". On Sunday, August 13, 1587, Manteo was christened on Roanoke Island, making him the first Native American to be baptized into the Church of England.

== Early life ==
Very little is known of Manteo's early life. He was born into the Croatan tribe, a small Native American group living in the coastal areas of what is now North Carolina. They may have been a branch of the larger Roanoke people or allied with them. The Croatan lived in current Dare County, an area encompassing the Alligator River, Croatan Sound, Roanoke Island, and parts of the Outer Banks, including Hatteras Island. Manteo first entered the historical record through his encounter with English explorers in 1584, when Sir Walter Raleigh dispatched the first of a number of expeditions to Roanoke Island to explore and eventually settle the New World.

== Travel to England ==
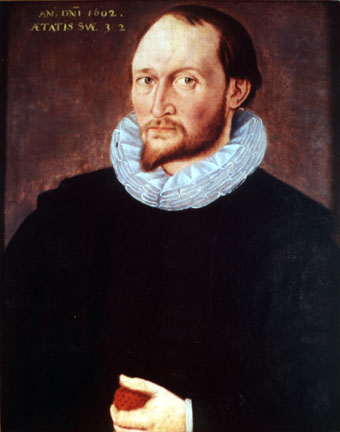
Thomas Harriot, who translated and learned the Carolina Algonquian language from Wanchese and Manteo.

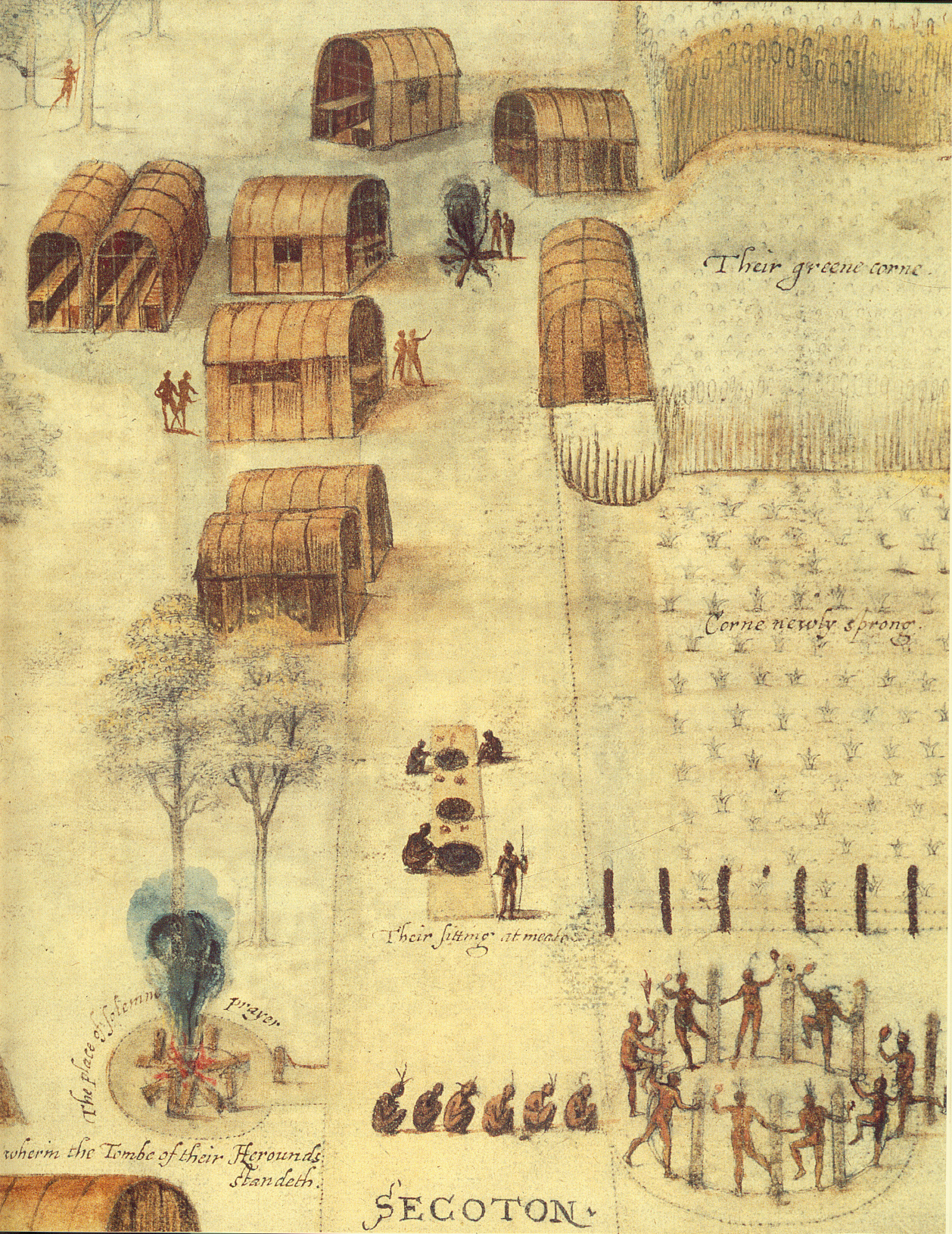
The village of Secoton on Roanoke Island, painted by Governor John White c. 1585

Early English encounters with the natives were friendly, and Manteo became one of the first Native Americans to travel to England. Despite the difficulties in communication, the explorers persuaded "two of the savages, being lustie men, whose names were Wanchese and Manteo" to accompany them on the return voyage to London, in order for the English to ascertain the exact nature of the New World and potential avenues of exploration or settlement.

Arriving in England in September 1584, Manteo and Wanchese soon caused a sensation among the English public. Raleigh's priority, however, was not publicity but rather intelligence about his new land of Virginia, and he restricted access to the exotic newcomers. He assigned the scientist Thomas Harriot the job of deciphering and learning the Carolina Algonquian language, using a phonetic alphabet of his own invention in order to effect the translation.

Both Wanchese and Manteo were hosted at Raleigh's London residence, Durham House. Unlike Manteo, Wanchese evinced little interest in learning English and did not befriend his hosts, remaining suspicious of English motives in the New World. He soon considered himself as a captive of the English rather than as their guest. By Christmas of 1584, Harriot learned to converse in Carolina Algonquian with the two Croatans. Accounts suggest that Manteo was far more co-operative than Wanchese.

Harriot and Manteo spent a number of days in one another's company; Harriot interrogated Manteo closely about life in the New World and learned much that would be to the advantage of future English settlers in North America. In addition, Harriot recorded the sense of awe with which the Native Americans viewed European technology:

Many things they sawe with us...as mathematical instruments, sea compasses...[and] spring clocks that seemed to goe of themselves – and many other things we had – were so strange unto them, and so farre exceeded their capacities to comprehend the reason and meanes how they should be made and done, that they thought they were rather the works of gods than men.

Manteo and Wanchese returned to the New World in April 1585, sailing with Sir Richard Grenville's expedition in the Tiger. They reached the warm waters of the Caribbean in just 21 days. The expedition was led by Sir Ralph Lane, and was accompanied by Harriot who, having mastered Carolina Algonquian, would act as translator between the local tribes and the English settlers.

Records indicate that Manteo and Wanchese traveled again to England later in the same decade. Following the voyage, Manteo, Wanchese, and the English returned to Roanoke. It is speculated that Sir Walter Raleigh chose to have Manteo accompany him on his journey to England in order to better acquaint him with certain elements of English culture; specifically, so that he would be able to improve his ability to speak English and understand Anglicanism.

== Lost Colony ==
In 1587, Manteo returned to Roanoke along with Governor John White's ill-fated expedition to establish the Roanoke Colony. Manteo was involved in several nighttime attacks which took place in 1587. The Croatan had informed the English that the Roanoke had killed several colonists. In response, the settlers launched an attack on the Roanoke, but killed several Croatan by mistake. As a mediator between the English and the Native Americans, and due to his loyalty to the colonists, Manteo was caught in the middle. He had mixed feelings about the attacks and understood the points of views of both sides.

== Relations with the Roanoke colonists ==
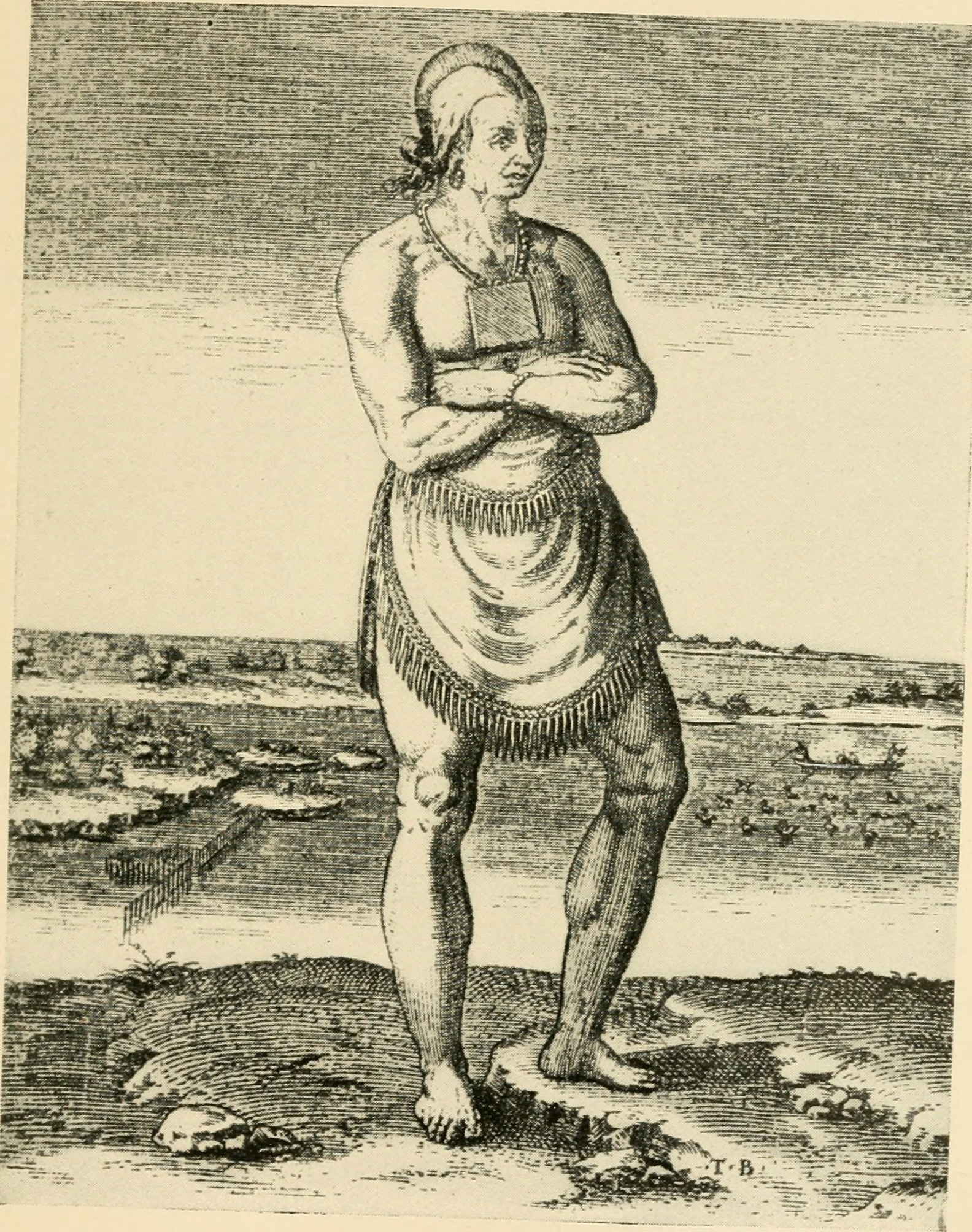
Engraving purported to be of Manteo, from The White Doe: the fate of Virginia Dare; an Indian legend (1901), but actually extracted from Harriot, Thomas (1590) Plate VII, captioned "A Chief Lord of the Roanoke"

Manteo served as a guide and translator to the English. Manteo and the English were able to learn about each other's language and culture. Manteo at times was also a mediating figure between the English and other Native Americans. Because of his status among the English and his peaceful communication with them, some of the Croatan considered Manteo to be disloyal to them and a traitor at times of conflict.

Wanchese and other Native Americans such as Towaye shared relationships with Manteo and the English, although Wanchese had a more negative relationship with the latter.

== Religion ==
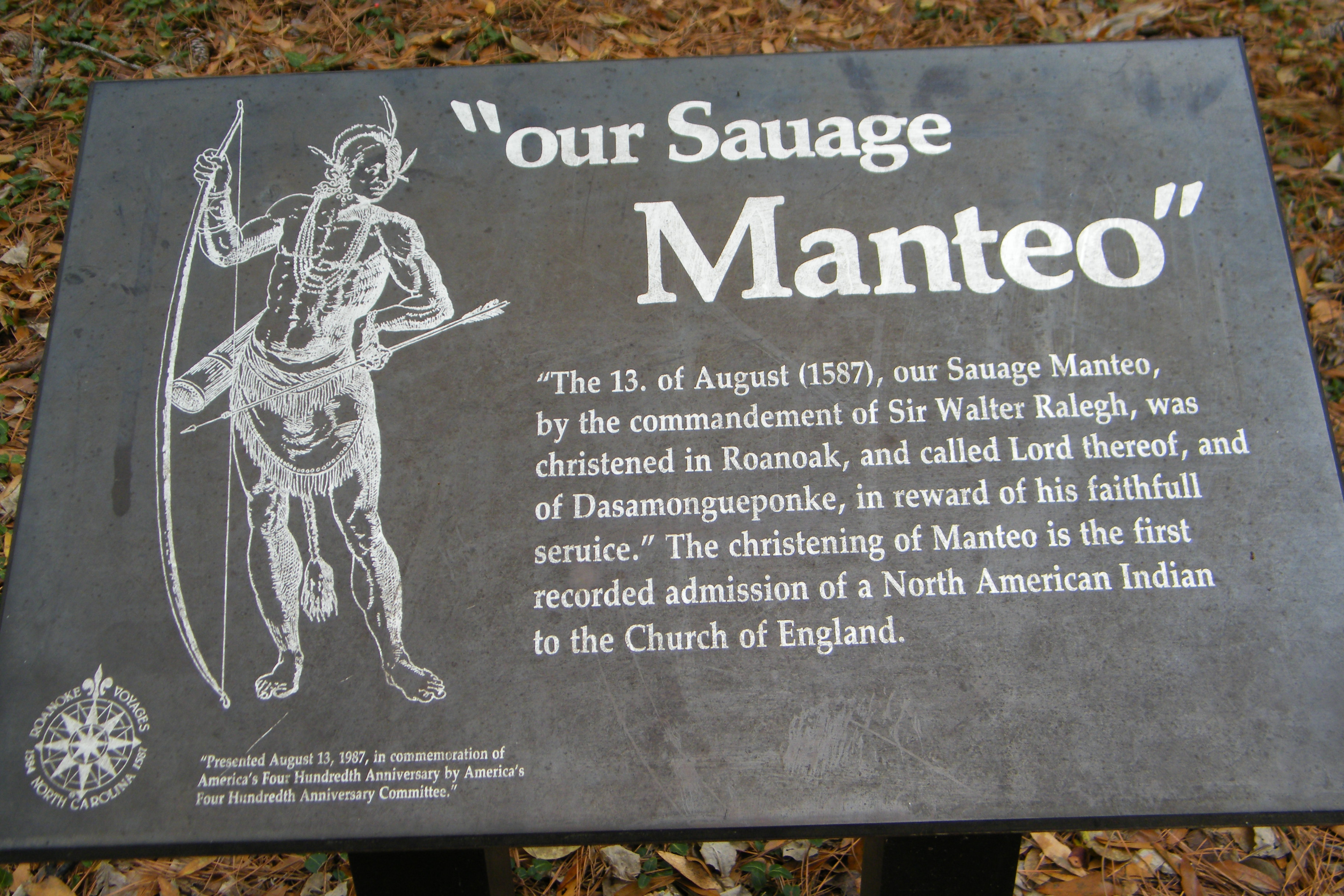
A plaque for the christening of Manteo at Roanoke Island

Manteo is recognized as being the first Native American who became an Anglican Christian. Manteo was possibly converted to Anglican Christianity by Raleigh. Some historians believe that Raleigh promoted this as a political maneuver to further Manteo's role in working with the English. Upon conversion, Manteo retained his given name. Manteo may have assisted in helping the English convert other Native Americans to Christianity as well. In 2008, the 125th Annual Convention of the Episcopal Diocese of East Carolina approved the commemoration of the Baptism of Manteo, along with that of Virginia Dare, to be kept on August 17 of each year.

== Death and legacy ==
Following the abandonment of the settlement, Manteo was lost to history. The details related to Manteo's death are unknown. He may have left with colonists during the abandonment of the Roanoke site. The town of Manteo, North Carolina, is named after him.
