= Neusiok =

Extinct Native American tribe in North Carolina

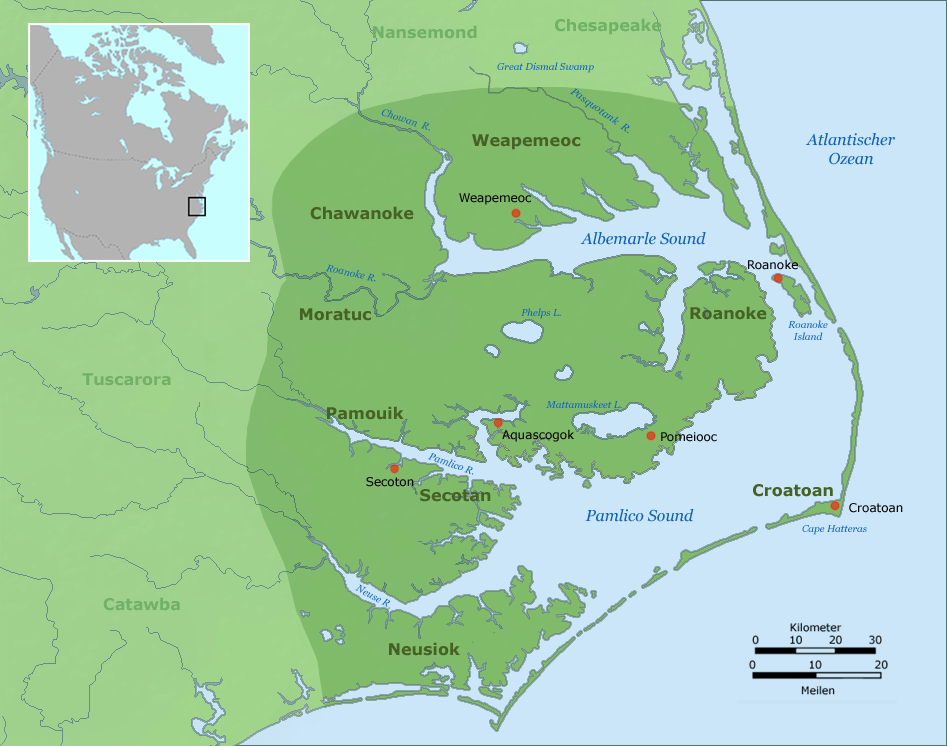
- 16th-century territories of the North Carolina Algonquian, Weapemeoc near the mouth of the Neuse River

Total population
- extinct as a tribe (possibly merged with the Tuscarora people in the early 18th century)

Regions with significant populations
- North Carolina (Lenoir, Craven and Carteret Counties)

Languages
- possibly an Algonquian or Iroquoian language

Religion
- Indigenous religion

The Neusiok were an Indigenous people of the Southeastern Woodlands in present-day North Carolina. They were also known as the Neuse Indians.

== Territory ==
The Neusiok lived along the southern banks of the Neuse River, primarily in what are now Craven and Carteret counties.

Their village, Chattooks, was near what is now New Bern, North Carolina.

== Language ==
Neusiok
- (unattested)
- Native to: United States
- Region: North Carolina
- Ethnicity: Neusiok
- Extinct: by 18th century
- Language family: unclassified (Algonquian or Iroquoian?)

Language codes
- ISO 639-3: None (mis)
- Glottolog: None

Their language is unattested but may have been an Algonquian or Iroquoian language.

== History ==
English explorers Philip Amadas and Arthur Barlowe wrote about the Neusiok in their 1584 expedition.

In one account, Wingina, Weroance of the Secotan (Roanoke), explained his own tribal history, in relation to the Neusiok, his neighboring tribe, referred to as the "Neiosioke" by Barlowe. According to Wingina, the Secotans endured years of warfare with the Neiosioke, and "some years earlier," he met with the Neiosioke king, in an effort to ensure a "permanent coexistence." The two leaders arranged a feast between the two groups. An unspecified number of Secotan men and 30 women attended a feast in the town of Neiosioke. The Neiosioke ambushed the Secotans at the feast, and by the time fighting ended, the Neiosioke had "slewn them every one, reserving the women and children only."

In 1709, an estimated 15 Neusiok warriors survived. The tribes' population fell dramatically after contact, and survivors may have joined the Tuscarora.
