= Wanchese =

Wanchese may refer to:

- Wanchese (Native American leader), Powhatan Roanoac chief encountered by colonists of the Roanoke Colony
- Wanchese, North Carolina, settlement named for him
