= U.S. Route 64 in North Carolina =

Highway in North Carolina, US

U.S. Highway 64
- Route of US 64 in North Carolina highlighted in red

Route information
- Maintained by NCDOT
- Length: 604 mi (972 km)
- Existed: 1932–present
- Tourist routes: Mountain Waters Scenic Byway; Waterfall Byway; Black Mountain Rag; Alligator River Route; Roanoke Voyages Corridor

Major junctions
- West end: US 64 / US 74 / SR 40 at the Tennessee state line near Ducktown, TN
- US 23 / US 441 in Franklin; I-26 / US 25 / US 74 in Hendersonville; US 52 in Lexington; I-85 near Lexington; I-73 / I-74 / US 220 in Asheboro; US 421 in Siler City; I-40 / I-87 / I-440 in Raleigh; I-540 in Knightdale; I-95 in Rocky Mount; US 13 / US 17 in Williamston
- East end: US 158 / NC 12 at Whalebone Junction

Location
- Country: United States
- State: North Carolina
- Counties: Cherokee, Clay, Macon, Jackson, Transylvania, Henderson, Rutherford, McDowell, Burke, Caldwell, Alexander, Iredell, Davie, Davidson, Randolph, Chatham, Wake, Franklin, Nash, Edgecombe, Martin, Washington, Tyrrell, Dare

Highway system
- United States Numbered Highway System; List; Special; Divided; North Carolina Highway System; Interstate; US; State; Scenic
| ← NC 63 | → NC 65 |

U.S. Route 64 (US 64) is the longest numbered route in the U.S. state of North Carolina, running 604 miles (972 km) from the Tennessee state line to the Outer Banks. The route passes through the westernmost municipality in the state, Murphy, and one of the most easternmost municipalities, Manteo, making US 64 a symbolic representation of the phrase "from Murphy to Manteo" which is used to refer to the expanse of the state. The highway is a major east–west route through the central and eastern portion of the state.

== Route description ==
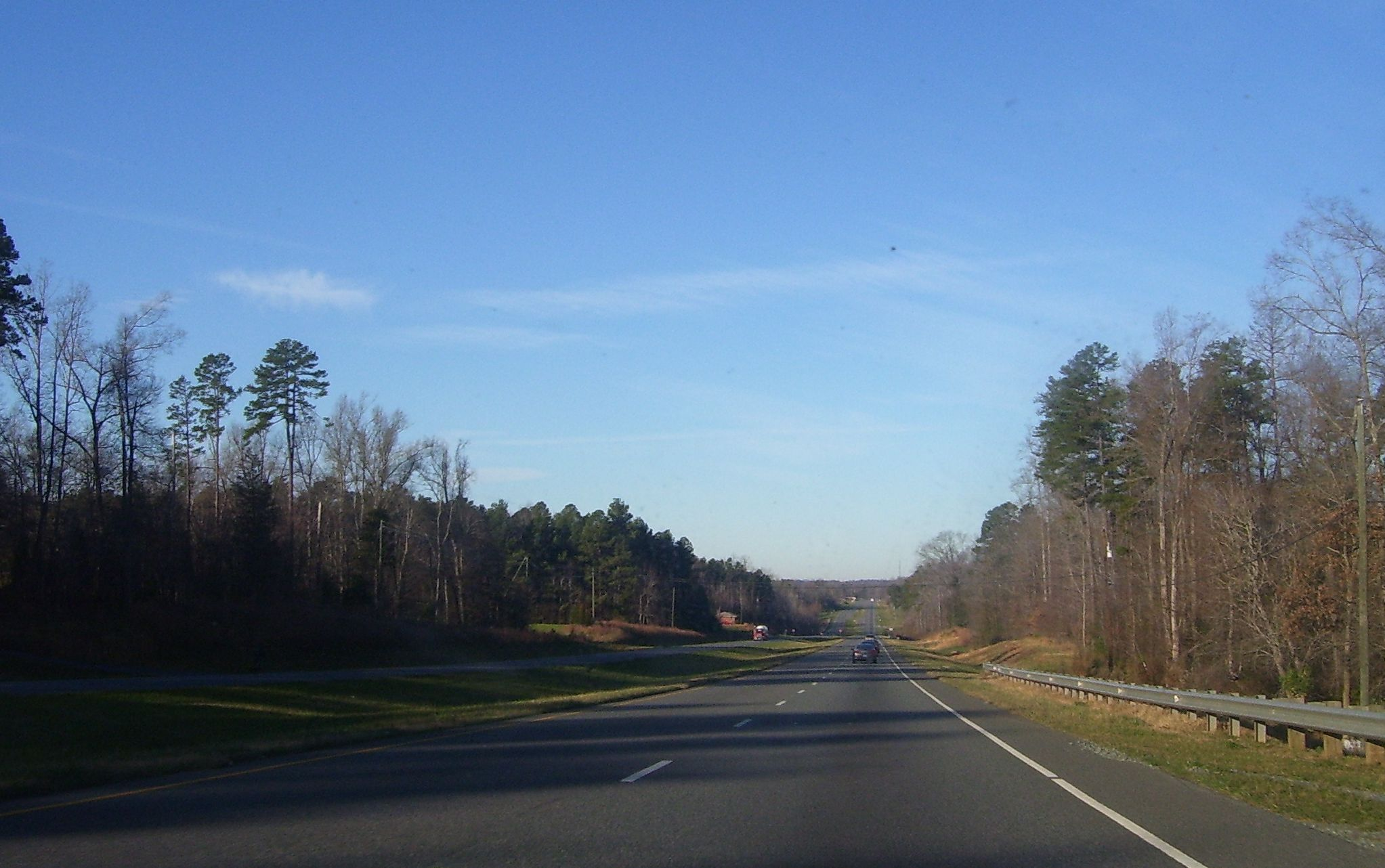
US 64 near Siler City

US 64 enters North Carolina in Cherokee County, west of Murphy. The highway serves the cities of Hendersonville, Brevard, Rutherfordton, Morganton, Lenoir, Statesville, Lexington, Asheboro, Siler City, Raleigh, Rocky Mount, Tarboro, Williamston, and Manteo.

The segment from Franklin to Highlands is a mountainous two-lane road limited to moderate-sized trucks. Large trucks are routed via Truck US 64 (US 23/441 and US 74) to Sylva, and Asheville.

The route passes through Brevard, Hendersonville, Chimney Rock State Park, and Forest City before turning in a more northerly direction towards Morganton, where it crosses I-40 for the first time. The route goes more north into the city of Lenoir where it crosses US 321. Leaving Lenoir, heading east towards Statesville, it crosses I-40 for a second time. After crossing I-40 again in Mocksville, U.S. 64 makes a southerly bypass of the Piedmont Triad region.

U.S. 64 is the primary east–west route through Randolph County and Chatham County, connecting the cities of Asheboro, Siler City and Pittsboro. In Asheboro, the route goes in the west and southern outskirts of the city, with access to The Zoo. The route continues onto mostly expressway and boulevard standards in Siler City, before traversing north of central Pittsboro. East of the municipality, U.S. 64 crosses Jordan Lake in the community of Wilsonville before entering Wake County. In Wake County, a divided expressway carries U.S. 64 through Apex and Cary, with a mixture of grade-separated interchanges and at-grade intersections along this segment. In Cary, U.S. 64 joins U.S. 1 forming the heavily traveled U.S. 1-64 freeway which connects Cary and southwestern Wake County to Raleigh, the I-440 Beltline and I-40.

Within the Raleigh city limits US 64 follows I-40. In 2006 a major section known as the Knightdale Bypass opened to ease traffic. After it was completed, US 64 became a continuous freeway as far east as Williamston, going through the communities of Nashville, Rocky Mount, and Tarboro. Closely paralleling this freeway segment, older alignments of US 64, following country roads and city streets, are known variously as Alternate US 64 (usually outside of city limits) and Business U.S. 64 (when inside of incorporated city limits). In Williamston, after forming a concurrency with both US 13 and US 17, it follows an exit ramp to become a four-lane undivided boulevard from Williamston to Plymouth. In 2017, I-87 was established along the Knightdale Bypass, with Future I-87 assigned to US 64 as far as Williamston.

Between Plymouth and Columbia, the route is once again a freeway. From Columbia to its eastern junction with US 264 it is a two lane undivided highway through the swamps of Tyrrell County. The route splits in Manns Harbor as Bypass US 64 uses the newer and wider Virginia Dare Memorial Bridge to cross Croatan Sound, bypassing Manteo to the south. The mainline route follows the older, narrower William B. Umstead Bridge and goes through the community of Manteo before rejoining the bypass route to access a series of bridges and causeways that connect Roanoke Island to Bodie Island on the Outer Banks. US 64 terminates at Whalebone Junction, a location in Nags Head that forms the three-way confluence of US 64, US 158 and NC 12.

US 64 also make up part of Corridor A in the Appalachian Development Highway System (ADHS). Corridor A connects I-285, in Sandy Springs, Georgia, to I-40, near Clyde, it overlaps 35 miles (56 km) of US 64, between Hayesville and Franklin. ADHS provides additional funds, as authorized by the U.S. Congress, which have enabled US 64 to benefit from the successive improvements along its routing through the corridor. The white-on-blue banner "Appalachian Highway" is used to mark the ADHS corridor.

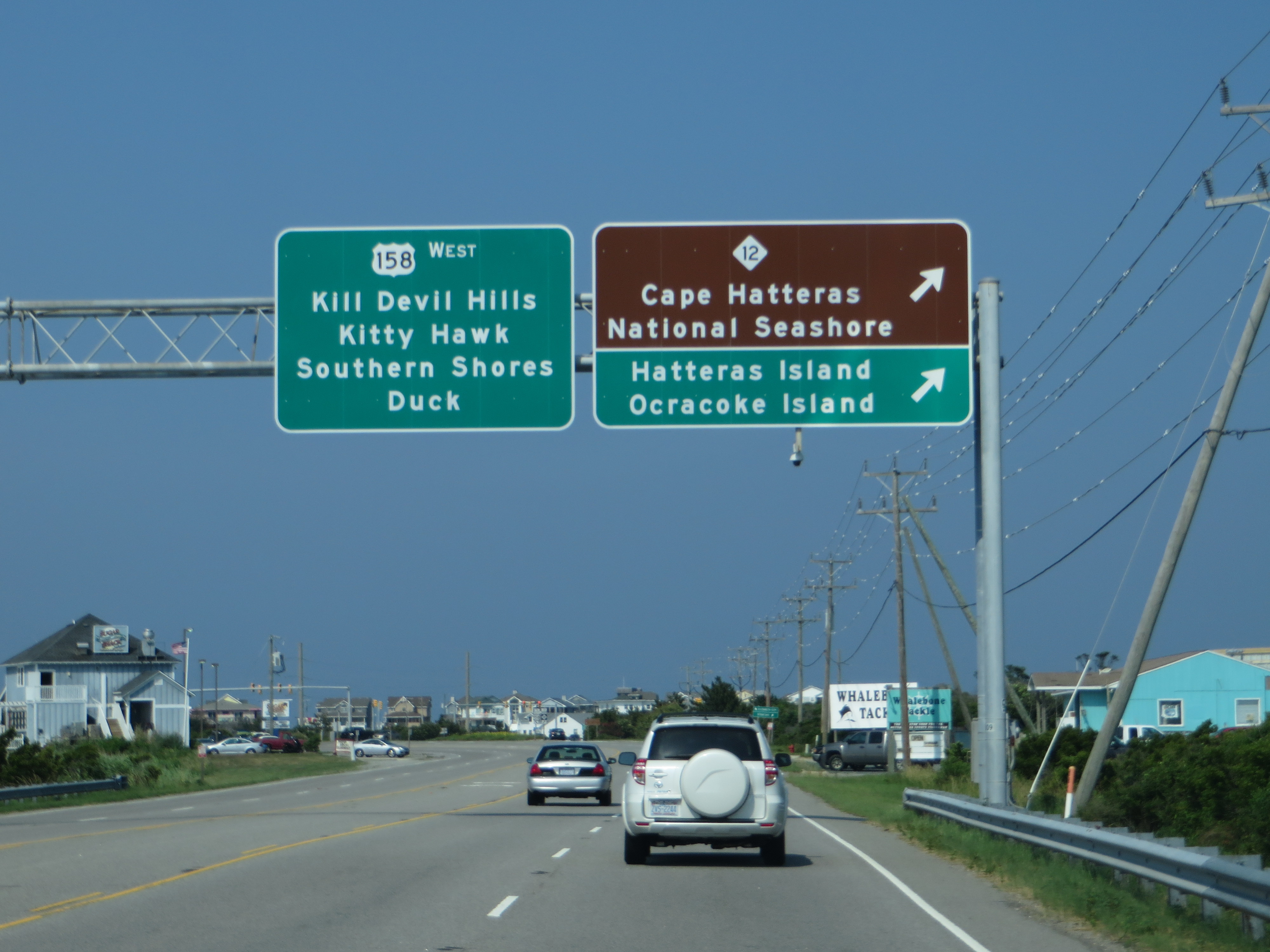
Eastern terminus of US 64 at Nags Head

Between Raleigh and Williamston, US 64 is either already, or scheduled to be, upgraded to interstate status. I-87 is already signed from I-440 to Rolesville Road along the Knightdale Bypass, with "Future I-87" signed along the US 64 to I-95, near Rocky Mount. Extending towards Williamston and beyond along US 17, the route is scheduled to become part of I-87, which will eventually connect the Research Triangle region with the Hampton Roads region.

US 64 overlaps with four state scenic byways: the Waterfall Byway, between Murphy and Rosman, Black Mountain Rag, centered at Bat Cave, Alligator River Route, between Columbia and Roanoke Island, and Roanoke Voyages Corridor, located on Roanoke Island.

== History ==
US 64 was established in 1932, joining NC 28 from the Tennessee state line to Old Fort, US 70/NC 10 between Old Fort and Statesville, and NC 90 between Statesville and Fort Landing. In late 1934, NC 28, NC 10, and NC 90 were dropped along the route. In 1937 or 1938, US 64 was rerouted east of Brasstown Creek, near Brasstown; its old alignment along Brasstown Road was downgraded to secondary road. In 1939 or 1940, US 64 was placed on new routing east of Hayesville; its old alignment along Myers Chapel Road was downgraded to secondary road.

Between 1939 and 1944, US 64/US 70 was removed from Knobs Landing (SR 1620), in Icard; in Statesville, US 64 is rerouted to its current routing, leaving NC 90. In 1941, US 64 was placed on new bypass south of Franklinville; its old alignment becoming US 64A. Around 1942, US 64 was placed on new routing east of Hayesville to NC 175; most of the old route was abandoned when Chatuga Lake was formed. Between 1945 and 1949: US 64 is placed on its modern alignment from the Tennessee state line to Murphy. US 64 was removed from Old Quebec Road (SR 1316), near Lake Toxaway. US 64 was placed on one-way splits in downtown Raleigh. US 64 was rerouted onto Thomas Avenue in Rocky Mount, eliminating US 64A. In Plymouth, US 64 was placed on new bypass south of the downtown area. In 1949, US 64 was placed on new bypass north of Siler City; its old alignment becoming US 64A.

In 1964, US 64 was removed along I-40 between Conover and Statesville; as a result, US 64 was rerouted along US 70 and replaced US 64 Bus.

In 1971, US 64 was placed on two new bypass routes, south of Hayesville and south of Columbia; both old alignments became US 64 business loops. Same year, US 64 in Hendersonville was rerouted onto one-way streets (sixth and seventh avenues) through the downtown area. In 1974, US 64 was placed on new bypass east of Franklin, in concurrency with US 23/US 441; most of its former routing remain part of NC 28. Same year, was placed on new routing east of Pittsboro, its old alignment was abandoned to make way for Jordan Lake. In 1975, US 64 was placed on new freeway bypass north of Eagle Rock to NC 39, south of Pilot; most of the old alignment became part of NC 97 and US 64 Bus., while the section going into Franklin County was downgraded to a secondary road. In 1976, US 64 was placed on new freeway bypass south of Pilot to NC 98/NC 231; ending a brief concurrency with NC 39, the routing to NC 98 was downgraded to a secondary road. In 1979, US 64 was placed on new freeway between NC 98/NC 231 to the Nashville bypass; its old alignment was to become US 64 Business, but was instead approved as US 64 Alternate instead. Also same year, US 64 was placed on new routing between the Clay-Macon county line to Franklin; its old alignment downgraded to a secondary road. In 1979, US 64 was placed on new bypass west of Murphy, in concurrency with US 19/US 129; its old alignment through Murphy was partly replaced by US 19 Bus., while Peachtree Street was downgraded to a secondary road. Also same year, US 64 was placed on new bypass north of Rosman, with its old alignment to become US 64 Business; however, this was not approved by AASHTO, downgrading the former route to a secondary road.

In 1984, US 64 was rerouted around Raleigh, from going north around, via the beltline, to south around after completion of the southern half of the beltline. Also same year, US 64 was placed on new freeway bypass north of Rocky Mount; its old alignment through downtown became US 64 Bus. In 1988, US 64 was rerouted between Morganton and Statesville, traversing north along NC 18 to Lenoir and NC 90 through Taylorsville; the old route continues on as US 70, though a request was made, but withdrawn, to establish the old alignment as an alternate route.

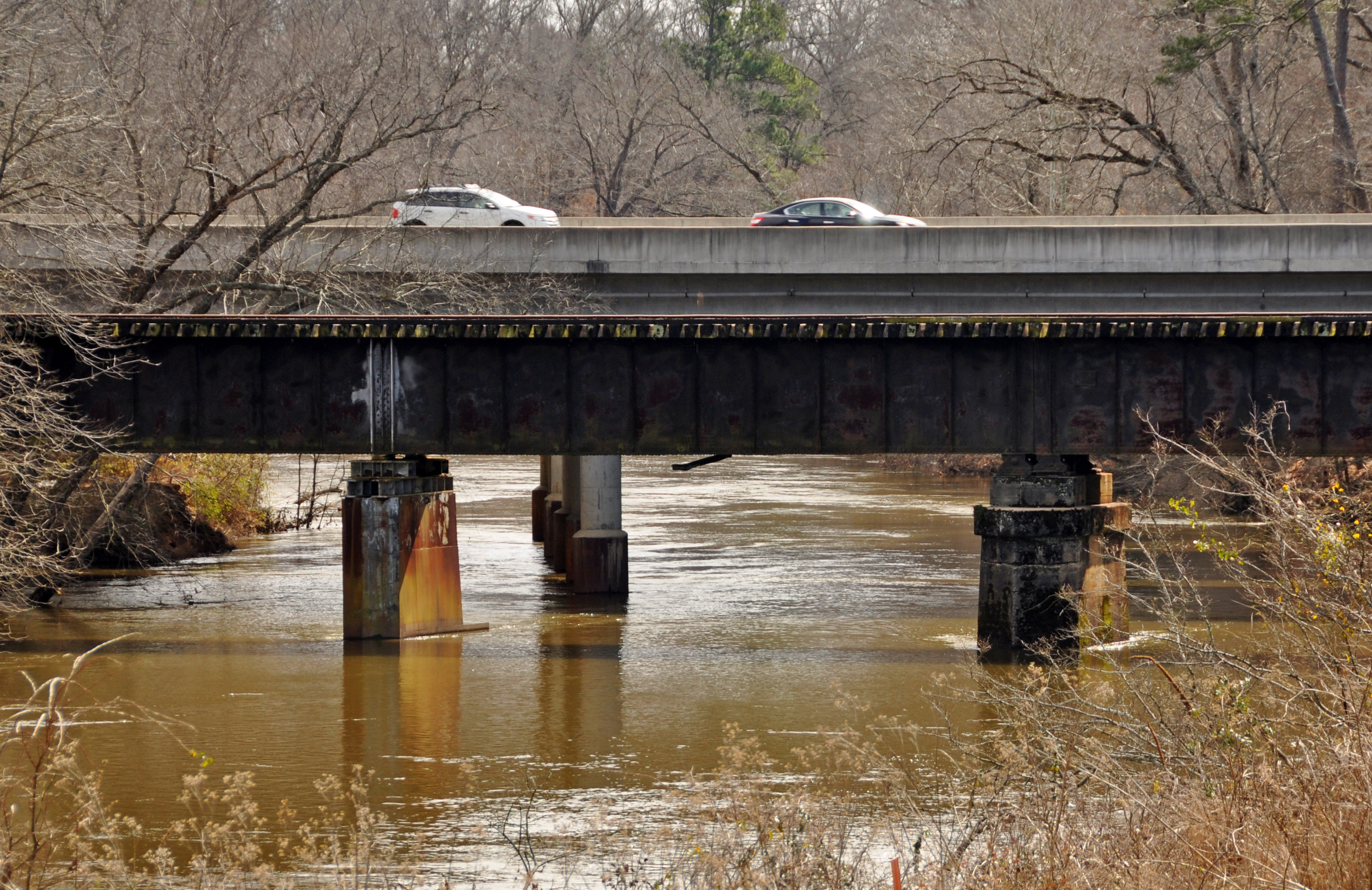
Knightdale Bypass (I-87/US 64/US 264) bridge over the Neuse River

In 1991, US 64/US 601 were rerouted in Mocksville, downgrading Salisbury Street and Wilkesboro Street to secondary roads. Also in 1991, with the establishment of I-440, US 64 was removed from the beltline around Raleigh and rerouted through the city: eastbound via Western Boulevard, Dorothea Drive, South Street, Person Street and New Bern Avenue; westbound via New Bern Avenue, Edenton Street, Blount Street, Lenoir Street, Cabarrus Street and Western Boulevard. In 1992, US 64/NC 90 were rerouted onto new road towards Garner Bagnal Boulevard, downgrading part of Front Street. In 1993, US 64 was placed on new bypass south of Jamesville; its old alignment becoming US 64 Bus. In 1994, NCDOT reversed its decision of routing US 64 through Raleigh and officially routed it back along the southern half of the beltline; reason given was that despite the ordinance change in 1991, signage for the routing did not change and was preferred. In 1996, US 64 was placed on new 18.33-mile (29.50 km) super-two between Taylorsville and Statesville; its former alignment remained NC 90. In 1997, US 64 was placed on new 29.84-mile (48.02 km) freeway between Princeville and Williamston; its former alignment was replaced by US 64 Alt.

In 2003, US 64 was placed on new freeway between Plymouth and Columbia, leaving its concurrency alignment with NC 32 and NC 94. In 2005, US 64 was placed on a freeway bypass north of Pittsboro; its old alignment became US 64 Bus. In 2006, US 64/US 264 was placed on new six-lane freeway bypass south of Knightdale, from I-440 to existing US 64 freeway segment near Eagle Rock; its former routing through Knightdale became an extension of US 64 Bus., with a hidden 1-mile (1.6 km) concurrency along I-440. Also in the same year, NCDOT submitted a request, which was subsequently withdrawn to split-up US 64 through Brevard; instead US 64 Bus. was reestablished along Caldwell Street as a hidden route, signed instead as westbound US 64, eastbound US 64 remains along Broad Street. Later that year, a two-year project concluded that widened US 64 from six to eight lanes on its concurrency with US 1 in Cary from Tryon Road to just south of the I-40/I-440 interchange; the interchanges with Cary Parkway (US 1 exit 99) and Walnut Street (exit 101) were also reconfigured. In 2009, US 64 was placed on new routing .16-mile (0.26 km) east of its intersection with US 19/74/129 in Murphy, next to the Hiwassee River. Its old alignment was to become a new alternate route, but that request was denied by AASHTO. The old alignment instead was downgraded to secondary roads (it was eventually upgraded to be an alternate route); NC 141 was extended .7-mile (1.1 km) south to meet the new route. The .7 mile extension was also on an even older alignment of US 64 (Old US 64) that was moved sometime around the 1970s. On October 1, 2012, I-40 exit 153 to US 64 was permanently closed by the NCDOT due to the redesigning of the I-40/I-77 interchange.

In Asheboro, a new US 64 Bypass was planned to go south around the city, with a new connector (an extension of NC 159 Spur) to the North Carolina Zoo. The proposed 13.7-mile (22.0 km) route was estimated to cost $370 million and scheduled to open in 2020. The NCDOT released an updated map on the project in January 2015 that eliminated the NC 159 interchange. Construction began in 2016 at an estimated cost of $348 million. In June 2017, NCDOT confirmed the new bypass will be signed as mainline US 64, with the old alignment becoming a business route. It opened to traffic on December 18, 2020, with the route through the city being signed as BUSINESS US 64.

=== Wake County ===
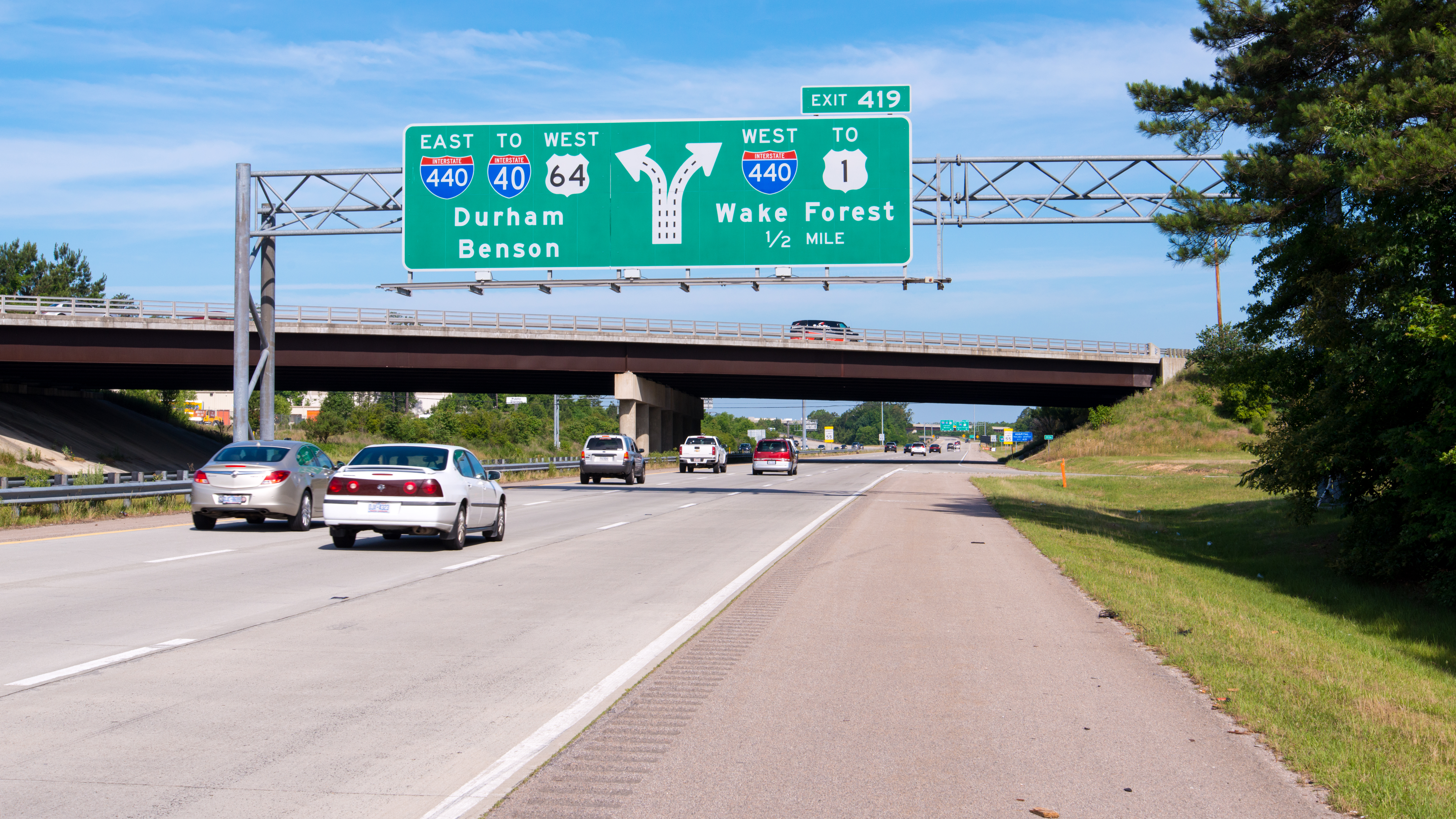
Exit 419 diagrammatic guide sign

Originally, US 64 followed Salem Road, north of Apex; near Cary, it followed Chatham Street and Hillsborough Street before meeting NC 54 on Western Boulevard, after which both go into Raleigh via Hillsborough Street. In central Raleigh, US 64 used Salisbury Street, Edenton Street, East Street, and finally New Bern Avenue. The final section followed the current US 64 Business to Wendell and Zebulon. Between 1950 and 1953, US 64 was removed from central Raleigh and followed then US 70A via Western Boulevard (in Cary) east to Boylan Avenue, then northeast to South Street before ending back on New Bern Avenue.

In 1960, US 64 was placed on a (non-freeway) bypass around Wendell; the old route became US 64 Business. A second (freeway) bypass in the Wendell/Lizard Lick area was added in 1975, the first bypass was added on to the western end of NC 97. In 1965, US 64 was given its modern routing from Apex to US 1; after concurrency, US 64 followed US 1 north around Raleigh to New Bern Avenue. In 1984, US 64 was removed from the northern arc of the beltline, migrating south to the completed southern arc.

== Future ==
As part of the widening project of I-40 to relieve the heavy traffic, the I-40/I-440/US 1/US 64 interchange is being redesigned. Construction is expected to begin in 2025 at a cost of $68.8 million.

== Junction list ==
| County | Location | mi | km | Exit | Destinations | Notes |
|---|---|---|---|---|---|---|
| Cherokee | | 0.00 | 0.00 | | US 64 / US 74 west (SR 40 west) – Cleveland | Continuation into Tennessee |
| Cherokee | | 12.2 | 19.6 | | NC 294 west – Hiwassee | To Hiwassee Dam |
| Cherokee | | 14.0 | 22.5 | | NC 60 south – Blue Ridge | |
| Cherokee | | 14.7 | 23.7 | | US 19 south / US 129 south (Blairsville Highway) – Blairsville | West end of US 19/US 129 overlap |
| Cherokee | Murphy | 19.9 | 32.0 | | US 19 Bus. north (Hiwassee Street) | |
| Cherokee | Murphy | 20.3 | 32.7 | | US 19 north / US 74 east / US 129 north – Andrews, Bryson City | East end of US 19/US 74/US 129 overlap |
| Cherokee | | 24.3 | 39.1 | | NC 141 north – Marble | |
| Hiwassee River | | | | | Sister L. John Meehan Bridge | |
| Clay | Hayesville | 33.2 | 53.4 | | US 64 Bus. east – Hayesville | |
| Clay | Hayesville | 33.7 | 54.2 | | NC 69 – Hiawassee | |
| Clay | Hayesville | 34.1 | 54.9 | | US 64 Bus. west – Hayesville | |
| Clay | Hayesville | 38.4 | 61.8 | | NC 175 south – Hiawassee | |
| Macon | | 62.9 | 101.2 | | Patton Road | To Nantahala Lake |
| Macon | Franklin | 66.7 | 107.3 | 67 | US 23 south / US 441 south / US 441 Bus. north – Clayton, Atlanta | West end of US 23/US 441 overlap |
| Macon | Franklin | 68.8 | 110.7 | 69 | US 23 north / US 441 north / NC 28 north – Sylva | East end of US 23/US 441 overlap; west end of NC 28 overlap |
| Macon | Highlands | 85.6 | 137.8 | | NC 106 south (Dillard Road) – Dillard | |
| Macon | Highlands | 85.9 | 138.2 | | NC 28 south – Walhalla | East end of NC 28 overlap |
| Jackson | Cashiers | 96.2 | 154.8 | | NC 107 – Glenville, Sylva, Walhalla | To Western Carolina University |
| Transylvania | | 106.3 | 171.1 | | NC 281 south | West end of NC 281 overlap; to Whitewater Falls |
| Transylvania | | 108.9 | 175.3 | | NC 281 north – Lake Toxaway | East end of NC 281 overlap |
| Transylvania | | 115.7 | 186.2 | | NC 215 north | |
| Transylvania | | 116.3 | 187.2 | | US 178 east – Rosman, Pickens | |
| Transylvania | Brevard | 124.0 | 199.6 | | US 64 Bus. east (Caldwell Street) | |
| Transylvania | Brevard | 124.6 | 200.5 | | US 276 south (Main Street) | West end of US 276 overlap |
| Transylvania | Brevard | 125.0 | 201.2 | | US 64 Bus. west (Caldwell Street) | Brevard College at intersection |
| Transylvania | Pisgah Forest | 128.0 | 206.0 | | US 276 north / NC 280 east – Asheville, Waynesville | East end of US 276 overlap |
| Henderson | Hendersonville | 145.0 | 233.4 | | US 25 Bus. south (Church Street) | One-way couplet |
| Henderson | Hendersonville | 145.0 | 233.4 | | US 25 Bus. north (King Street) | One-way couplet |
| Henderson | Hendersonville | 147.0 | 236.6 | | I-26 (US 25 / US 74) – Asheville, Spartanburg | Cloverleaf interchange; I-26 exit 49 |
| Henderson | Bat Cave | 159.6 | 256.9 | | US 74A / NC 9 (Gerton Highway) – Asheville, Gerton | West end of US 74A/NC 9 overlap |
| Rutherford | Lake Lure | 166.8 | 268.4 | | NC 9 south – Mill Spring | East end of NC 9 overlap |
| Rutherford | Rutherfordton | 182.7 | 294.0 | | US 221 (Main Street) – Marion | |
| Rutherford | Ruth | 183.2 | 294.8 | | US 74A east – Spindale | East end of US 74A overlap |
| McDowell | | 198.7 | 319.8 | | NC 226 – Marion, Shelby | |
| Burke | Morganton | 212.3 | 341.7 | | I-40 – Asheville, Hickory | I-40 exit 103 |
| Burke | Morganton | 213.1 | 343.0 | | US 70 east (Fleming Drive east) / US 64 Bus. east (Burkemont Avenue north) | South end of US 70 overlap |
| Burke | Morganton | 214.1 | 344.6 | | US 70 west / US 70 Bus. east (Union Street) – Marion | North end of US 70 overlap |
| Burke | Morganton | 215.3 | 346.5 | | NC 181 (Green Street) – Linville, Newland | |
| Burke | Morganton | 216.9 | 349.1 | | US 64 Bus. west / NC 18 south | West end of NC 18 overlap |
| Caldwell | Lenoir | 228.6 | 367.9 | | Harper Avenue to US 321 north – Boone Southwest Boulevard (Sam Erby Jr. Highway) to US 321 south – Hickory | |
| Caldwell | Lenoir | 231.5 | 372.6 | | US 321 / NC 90 west – Blowing Rock, Boone, Hickory | West end of NC 90 overlap |
| Caldwell | Lenoir | 232.9 | 374.8 | | NC 18 north – Wilkesboro | East end of NC 18 overlap |
| Alexander | | 247.4 | 398.2 | | NC 127 south – Hickory | |
| Alexander | Taylorsville | 250.6 | 403.3 | | NC 90 east | East end of NC 90 overlap |
| Alexander | Taylorsville | 252.5 | 406.4 | 254 | NC 16 – Taylorsville, Conover | Interchange |
| Iredell | | 268.6 | 432.3 | | NC 90 west (Taylorsville Highway) – Stony Point, Taylorsville | West end of NC 90 overlap |
| Iredell | Statesville | 269.3 | 433.4 | | I-40 – Hickory, Winston-Salem | I-40 exit 148 |
| Iredell | Statesville | 270.6 | 435.5 | | US 70 – Conover, Hickory, Salisbury | |
| Iredell | Statesville | 271.4 | 436.8 | | NC 90 east (West End Avenue) / Lackey Street | East end of NC 90 overlap |
| Iredell | Statesville | 272.5 | 438.5 | | US 21 south / NC 115 (Center Street) – Troutman | West end of US 21 overlap |
| Iredell | Statesville | 272.9 | 439.2 | | NC 90 west (Water Street) / Green Street | |
| Iredell | Statesville | 273.8 | 440.6 | | US 21 north (Sullivan Road) / East End Avenue / Stockton Street | East end of US 21 overlap |
| Iredell | Statesville | | | | Bridge over I-77; no access to freeway | |
| Iredell | Statesville | 275.9 | 444.0 | | I-40 west – Statesville | Permanently closed as of October 1, 2012; was westbound exit and eastbound entrance; I-40 exit 153 |
| Iredell | Statesville | 276.5 | 445.0 | | Old Mocksville Road to I-40 | Serves Davis Regional Medical Center; I-40 exit 154 |
| Iredell | | 285.3 | 459.1 | | I-40 – Statesville, Winston-Salem | I-40 exit 162 |
| Davie | | 288.0 | 463.5 | | NC 901 north – Harmony, Union Grove | |
| Davie | | 293.0 | 471.5 | | I-40 – Statesville, Winston-Salem | I-40 exit 168 |
| Davie | Mocksville | 295.4 | 475.4 | | US 601 north (Valley Road) – Yadkinville | West end of US 601 overlap |
| Davie | Mocksville | 296.6 | 477.3 | | US 158 east / US 601 south – Clemmons, Winston-Salem, Cooleemee, Salisbury | East end of US 601 overlap; western terminus of US 158 |
| Davie | Fork | 304.0 | 489.2 | | NC 801 – Advance, Cooleemee | |
| Yadkin River | | | | | Bridge | |
| Davidson | | 310.9 | 500.3 | | NC 150 – Salisbury, Winston-Salem | Interchange |
| Davidson | Lexington | 313.6 | 504.7 | | I-285 / US 52 – Salisbury, Winston-Salem | I-285 exit 89 |
| Davidson | Lexington | 314.4 | 506.0 | | I-85 BL / US 29 south / US 70 west | West end of freeway section; west end of I-85 BL/US 29/US 70 overlap |
| Davidson | Lexington | | | — | Smokehouse Lane | Right-in/right-out interchange; westbound exit and entrance |
| Davidson | Lexington | 315.5 | 507.7 | — | NC 8 (Winston Road) – Lexington, Winston-Salem | East end of freeway |
| Davidson | Lexington | 316.3 | 509.0 | | I-85 BL / US 29 north / US 70 east – Thomasville, High Point | Interchange; east end of I-85 BL/US 29/US 70 overlap |
| Davidson | Lexington | 316.3 | 509.0 | | Lexington, Downtown | Partial interchange; no westbound entrance |
| Davidson | | 319.9 | 514.8 | | I-85 – Greensboro, Salisbury, Charlotte | I-85 exit 96 |
| Davidson | | 325.1 | 523.2 | | NC 109 – Thomasville, Denton | Interchange |
| Randolph | | | | 339 | US 64 Bus. east – Asheboro | West end of freeway (Asheboro Bypass) |
| Randolph | | | | 341 | NC 49 – Charlotte | |
| Randolph | | | | 344 | I-73 / I-74 / US 220 – Rockingham, Greensboro | Cloverleaf interchange; signed as exit 344A (south/east) and 344B (north/west); I-73 exit 70 |
| Randolph | | | | 346 | Zoo Connector (NC 159 Spur) to NC 159 | To North Carolina Zoo |
| Randolph | | | | 349 | NC 42 – Asheboro, Sanford | |
| Randolph | | | | 352 | US 64 Bus. west / NC 49 south – Asheboro | Left exit; east end of freeway (Asheboro Bypass); west end of NC 49 overlap |
| Randolph | Ramseur | 357.7 | 575.7 | | NC 22 north – Franklinville | West end of NC 22 overlap |
| Randolph | Ramseur | 358.0 | 576.1 | | NC 22 south (Coleridge Road) – Coleridge | East end of NC 22 overlap |
| Randolph | Ramseur | 359.5 | 578.6 | | NC 49 north – Liberty, Burlington | East end of NC 49 overlap |
| Chatham | Siler City | 372.0 | 598.7 | | US 421 – Greensboro, Sanford | Interchange; US 421 exit 171 |
| Chatham | | 383.0 | 616.4 | 378 | US 64 Bus. east – Pittsboro | West end of freeway; no westbound exit |
| Chatham | | 385.0 | 619.6 | 381 | US 15 south / US 501 south / NC 87 – Burlington, Spring Lake | South end of US 15 / US 501 overlap |
| Chatham | Pittsboro | 387.6 | 623.8 | 383 | US 15 north / US 501 north – Chapel Hill, Sanford, Carthage | North end of US 15 / US 501 overlap |
| Chatham | | | | 385 | Chatham Park Way | |
| Chatham | | 390.4 | 628.3 | 386 | US 64 Bus. west – Pittsboro | East end of freeway |
| Chatham | | 400.7 | 644.9 | | NC 751 north – Durham | |
| Wake | | 403.8 | 649.9 | | Kelly Road | Interchange |
| Wake | Apex | 403.9 | 650.0 | | NC 540 Toll (Triangle Expressway) | Cloverleaf interchange; NC 540 exit 59 |
| Wake | Apex | 404.9 | 651.6 | | NC 55 (Williams Street) – Apex, Durham | Interchange |
| Wake | Apex | 406.3 | 653.9 | | Salem Street – Apex Downtown | Interchange |
| Wake | Cary | 409.8 | 659.5 | 404A | US 1 south – Sanford | Eastbound exit and westbound left entrance; US 1 exit 98B |
| Wake | Cary | 409.8 | 659.5 | — | Tryon Road | No westbound exit; Tryon Rd. exit 404B |
| Wake | Cary | 409.8 | 659.5 | — | US 1 south – Sanford | West end of US 1 overlap; westbound left exit and eastbound left entrance; US 1 exit 98B |
| Wake | Cary | 411.2 | 661.8 | 99 | Cary Parkway | Partial cloverleaf interchange; exit numbers follow US 1 |
| Wake | Cary | 413.0 | 664.7 | 101 | Walnut Street / Buck Jones Road / Crossroads Boulevard | Split into exits 101A (Walnut St.) and 101B (Buck Jones Rd. / Crossroads Blvd.) westbound; Crossroads Blvd. not signed eastbound |
| Wake | Raleigh | 413.6 | 665.6 | — | I-40 west – RDU Airport, Durham I-440 east / US 1 north – Raleigh, Wake Forest | East end of US 1 overlap; west end of I-40 overlap; counterclockwise terminus of I-440; I-40 exit 293A; I-440 exit 1A; cloverleaf interchange |
| Wake | Raleigh | 415.8 | 669.2 | 295 | Gorman Street | Exit numbers follow I-40 |
| Wake | Raleigh | 417.9 | 672.5 | 297 | Lake Wheeler Road | |
| Wake | Raleigh | 418.9 | 674.2 | 298 | US 70 east / US 401 south / NC 50 south (Saunders Street) – Fayetteville, Downtown Raleigh, Garner | Signed as exits 298A (east/south) and 298B (west/north) |
| Wake | Raleigh | 419.6 | 675.3 | 299 | Hammond Road / Person Street | |
| Wake | Raleigh | 421.0 | 677.5 | 300 | Rock Quarry Road | |
| Wake | Raleigh | 422.0 | 679.1 | 16 | I-40 east (Tom Bradshaw Freeway) / I-87 / I-440 begin – Benson, Wilmington | Exit numbers follow I-440; east end of I-40 overlap; south end of I-87/I-440 overlap; clockwise terminus of I-440; I-40 exit 301 |
| Wake | Raleigh | 423.9 | 682.2 | 15 | Poole Road | |
| Wake | Raleigh | 424.9 | 683.8 | 3 | I-440 west to US 1 – Wake Forest US 264 begins | Exit numbers follow I-87; north end of I-440 overlap; west end of US 264 overlap; I-440 exit 14 |
| Wake | Raleigh | 425.5 | 684.8 | 4 | New Hope Road | |
| Wake | Knightdale | 427.7 | 688.3 | 6 | Hodge Road | |
| Wake | Knightdale | 428.7 | 689.9 | 7 | I-540 west – Wake Forest, RDU Airport | I-540 exit 26 |
| Wake | Knightdale | 431.0 | 693.6 | 9 | Smithfield Road | |
| Wake | Wendell | 432.7 | 696.4 | 11 | Wendell Falls Parkway | |
| Wake | Wendell | 434.5 | 699.3 | 13 | US 64 Bus. (Wendell Boulevard) – Knightdale | |
| Wake | Wendell | 434.9 | 699.9 | 14 | I-87 ends – Rolesville | Temporary east end of I-87 overlap; westbound exit and eastbound entrance |
| Wake | | 437.8 | 704.6 | 432 | Lizard Lick Road – Wendell | Exit number follow US 64 |
| Wake | Zebulon | 441.0 | 709.7 | 435 | US 64 Bus. west / NC 96 – Zebulon, Oxford | |
| Wake | Zebulon | 442.0 | 711.3 | 436 | US 264 east to NC 97 – Wilson, Greenville | East end of US 264 overlap; US 264 exit 19 |
| Bunn Lake | | | | Bridge | | |
| Franklin | | 444.7 | 715.7 | 439 | NC 39 – Louisburg | |
| Franklin | | 447.5 | 720.2 | 442 | SR 1737 (Tant Road) | |
| Nash | | 450.8 | 725.5 | 446 | US 64 Alt. east / NC 231 to NC 98 – Spring Hope, Middlesex | |
| Nash | | 455.8 | 733.5 | 450 | NC 581 – Spring Hope, Bailey | |
| Nash | | 458.3 | 737.6 | 453 | Old Franklin Road – Momeyer | |
| Nash | Nashville | 463.6 | 746.1 | 458 | Western Avenue (US 64 Bus. east) / US 64 Alt. west – Nashville, Momeyer | |
| Nash | Nashville | 463.7 | 746.3 | 459 | NC 58 – Nashville, Castalia | |
| Nash | Nashville | 465.9 | 749.8 | 461 | US 64 Bus. west – Nashville, Red Oak | |
| Nash | | 468.3 | 753.7 | 463 | Old Carriage Road – Red Oak | |
| Nash | Rocky Mount | 468.5 | 754.0 | 464 | I-95 – Wilson, Fayetteville, Richmond | Signed as exits 464A (south) and 464B (north); I-95 exit 138; cloverleaf interchange with Collector/distributor lanes |
| Nash | Rocky Mount | 470.2 | 756.7 | 466 | Winstead Avenue | |
| Nash | Rocky Mount | 472.1 | 759.8 | 467 | US 64 Bus. east (Buck Leonard Boulevard) / Sunset Avenue | |
| Nash | Rocky Mount | 473.1 | 761.4 | 468A | US 301 (Wesleyan Boulevard) – Wilson | |
| Nash | Rocky Mount | 473.8 | 762.5 | 468B | NC 43 north (Benvenue Road) to NC 48 / Peachtree Street | West end of NC 43 overlap |
| Nash | Rocky Mount | 474.7 | 764.0 | 469 | US 301 Bus. (Church Street) | |
| Edgecombe | Rocky Mount | 475.1 | 764.6 | 470 | NC 97 (Atlantic Avenue) | |
| Edgecombe | Rocky Mount | 477.0 | 767.7 | 472 | US 64 Alt. east / US 64 Bus. west / NC 43 south – Rocky Mount | East end of NC 43 overlap |
| Edgecombe | | 482.1 | 775.9 | 478 | Kingsboro Road | |
| Edgecombe | Tarboro | 487.9 | 785.2 | 484 | NC 122 (McNair Road) – Edgecombe Community College | |
| Edgecombe | Tarboro | 490.3 | 789.1 | 485 | US 258 south / US 64 Alt. west / NC 111 south / NC 122 south – Tarboro, Farmville | West end of US 258/NC 111/NC 122 overlap |
| Edgecombe | Princeville | 491.5 | 791.0 | 486 | US 258 north / US 64 Alt. east / NC 111 north / NC 122 north – Princeville, Scotland Neck | East end of US 258/NC 111/NC 122 overlap; eastbound exit and westbound entrance |
| Edgecombe | Princeville | 492.3 | 792.3 | 487 | Kingsboro Road | |
| Edgecombe | | 493.7 | 794.5 | 488 | Shiloh Farm Road | |
| Edgecombe | | 496.3 | 798.7 | 491 | SR 1524 (Chinquapin Road) | |
| Edgecombe | | 499.5 | 803.9 | 494 | NC 42 – Ahoskie, Wilson | |
| Edgecombe | | 501.5 | 807.1 | 496 | US 13 south / NC 11 – Bethel, Greenville | East end of US 13 overlap |
| Martin | | 507.3 | 816.4 | 502 | NC 903 – Robersonville, Hamilton | |
| Martin | | 511.0 | 822.4 | 505 | Robersonville Products Road | |
| Martin | Everetts | 512.6 | 824.9 | 507 | US 64 Alt. – Everetts | |
| Martin | | 517.3 | 832.5 | 512 | NC 125 (Prison Camp Road) – Williamston | |
| Martin | | 519.6 | 836.2 | 514 | US 17 south / US 17 Bus. north – Williamston, Washington | East end of US 17 overlap |
| Martin | | 521.3 | 839.0 | — | US 13 / US 17 north / US 64 Alt. west – Williamston, Windsor | East end of US 13/US 17 overlap; future I-87 north; US 17 exit 515; US 64 Alt. not signed eastbound; access between US 13/US 17 and US 64 Alt. via East Boulevard |
| Martin | | 529.7 | 852.5 | | US 64 Bus. east | |
| Martin | Jamesville | 530.6 | 853.9 | | NC 171 – Washington | |
| Martin | Jamesville | 531.3 | 855.0 | | US 64 Bus. west | |
| Washington | Plymouth | 538.8 | 867.1 | | NC 149 north (Ken Trowbridge Road) | Southern terminus of NC 149 |
| Washington | Plymouth | 540.8 | 870.3 | | NC 32 south (Washington Street) – Washington | West end of NC 32 overlap |
| Washington | Pineridge | 543.7 | 875.0 | | NC 45 south | West end of NC 45 overlap |
| Washington | Pineridge | 543.9 | 875.3 | | NC 45 north – Colerain | East end of NC 45 overlap |
| Washington | | 544.7 | 876.6 | | NC 32 north – Roper | At-grade intersection; west end of freeway; east end of NC 32 overlap |
| Washington | | 548.9 | 883.4 | 544 | Mill Pond Road – Roper | |
| Washington | | 553.5 | 890.8 | 548 | NC 37 north to NC 32 – Edenton | |
| Washington | | 559.7 | 900.7 | 554 | To NC 94 – Edenton | |
| Washington | | 561.9 | 904.3 | 557 | Creswell | Signed as exit 558 westbound |
| Washington | | 562.8 | 905.7 | 558 | Alligood Road | |
| Tyrrell | | 567.3 | 913.0 | 562 | Travis Road | |
| Tyrrell | | 570.1 | 917.5 | | NC 94 north | At-grade intersection; east end of freeway; west end of NC 94 overlap |
| Tyrrell | Columbia | 571.2 | 919.3 | | US 64 Bus. east / NC 94 south – Fairfield | East end of NC 94 overlap |
| Tyrrell | Columbia | 571.6 | 919.9 | | US 64 Bus. west | |
| Alligator River | | | | Lindsay C. Warren Bridge | | |
| Dare | Manns Harbor | 599.3 | 964.5 | | US 264 west – Stumpy Point, Engelhard | Eastern terminus of US 264 |
| Dare | Manns Harbor | 600.9 | 967.1 | | US 64 Byp. east (Virginia Dare Memorial Bridge) – Manteo, Nags Head | To Roanoke Island Sites |
| Dare | Croatan Sound | | | William B. Umstead Memorial Bridge | | |
| Dare | Manteo | 608.9 | 979.9 | | Ananias Dare Street (NC 400) | One-way street, inbound access only from NC 400; western terminus of NC 400 |
| Dare | Manteo | 610.2 | 982.0 | | Fernando Street (NC 400 east) – Manteo Waterfront, Festival Park, Historic Site | One-way street, outbound access only to NC 400; western terminus of NC 400 |
| Dare | | 611.3 | 983.8 | | US 64 Byp. west (Virginia Dare Memorial Bridge) / NC 345 south – Columbia, Wanchese | |
| Dare | Roanoke Sound | | | Washington Baum Bridge | | |
| Dare | Roanoke Sound | | | Melvin R. Daniels Bridge | | |
| Dare | Nags Head | 614.8 | 989.4 | | US 158 west | Eastern terminus of US 158 |
| Dare | Nags Head | 614.9 | 989.6 | | NC 12 – Hatteras Island, Cape Hatteras National Seashore, Ocracoke | Whalebone Junction; eastern terminus; highway continues as NC 12 north |
1.000 mi = 1.609 km; 1.000 km = 0.621 mi: Closed/former; Concurrency terminus; Incomplete access; Tolled

== See also ==
- Alligator River National Wildlife Refuge
- Special routes of U.S. Route 64
- Catawba River
- Chatuge Dam
- Chimney Rock State Park
- French Broad River
- Intracoastal Waterway
- Jordan Lake
- North Carolina Bicycle Route 2
- Nantahala National Forest
- Pamlico Sound
- Pisgah National Forest
- Tar River
- Yadkin River

U.S. Route 64
| Previous state: Tennessee | North Carolina | Next state: Terminus |
