= Manns Harbor, North Carolina =

Place in North Carolina, US

- Census-designated place
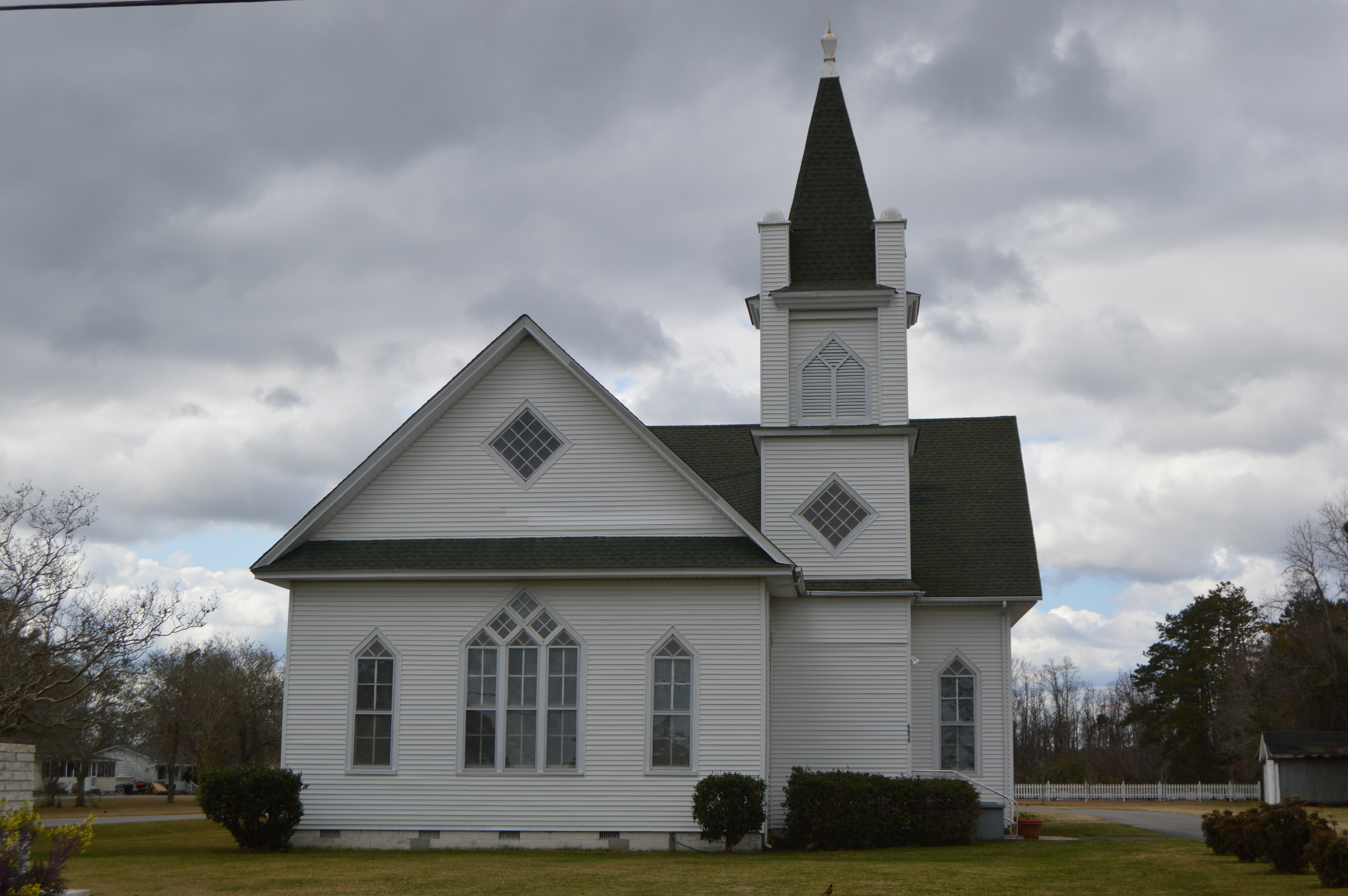
- Methodist church

- Location in Dare County and the state of North Carolina.
- Coordinates: 35°53′09″N 75°45′46″W
- Country: United States
- State: North Carolina
- County: Dare County
- Named for: Charles Mann

Area
  - Total: 4.01 sq mi (10.39 km^{2})
  - Land: 3.99 sq mi (10.34 km^{2})
  - Water: 0.019 sq mi (0.05 km^{2})
- Elevation: 5 ft (1.5 m)

Population (2020)
  - Total: 790
  - Density: 198/sq mi (76.4/km^{2})
- Time zone: UTC-5 (Eastern (EST))
  - Summer (DST): UTC-4 (EDT)
- ZIP code: 27953
- Area code: 252
- GNIS feature ID: 989288
- FIPS code: 37-40980

Manns Harbor is a census-designated place (CDP) in Dare County, North Carolina, United States. As of the 2020 census, Manns Harbor had a population of 790.

== Overview ==
Before the first settlers arrived in the vicinity of Manns Harbor, the Native American village Dasamongueponke existed on or close to the site.

Located east of the intersection of U.S. Routes 64 and 264, it is nestled along the western bank of Croatan Sound. Before 1957, Manns Harbor used to harbor a ferry that traversed the sound and provided access to Roanoke Island. Today, the William B. Umstead Bridge (completed in 1957) and the four-lane Virginia Dare Memorial Bridge (completed in 2002) link Manns Harbor on the mainland to Manteo on Roanoke Island. The community provides a gateway to North Carolina's Outer Banks.

The residents of Manns Harbor are governed by the Dare County Board of Commissioners. Manns Harbor is part of District 1, along with Manteo, Roanoke Island, and Wanchese.

In 2013, local resident, Harry C. Mann, was indicted for nearly $334,000 in kickbacks from Chowan County metal recycling companies and others over six years to scrap metal and equipment from the range. Military aircraft use the nearby Dare County Bombing Range on mainland Dare County off U.S. 264 south of Manns Harbor for target practice.

== Demographics ==
Historical population
Census	Pop.	Note	%±
2020	790		—
U.S. Decennial Census

=== 2020 census ===
Manns Harbor racial composition
Race	Number	Percentage
White (non-Hispanic)	627	79.37%
Black or African American (non-Hispanic)	9	1.14%
Native American	4	0.51%
Asian	3	0.38%
Other/Mixed	41	5.19%
Hispanic or Latino	106	13.42%

As of the 2020 United States census, there were 790 people, 311 households, and 255 families residing in the CDP.

== Airports ==
The Hyde County Airport and Dare County Regional Airport are the closest airports.

== Education ==
Residents are zoned to Dare County Schools. Zoned schools include Manteo Elementary School, Manteo Middle School, and Manteo High School.
