= Virginia Dare Memorial Bridge =

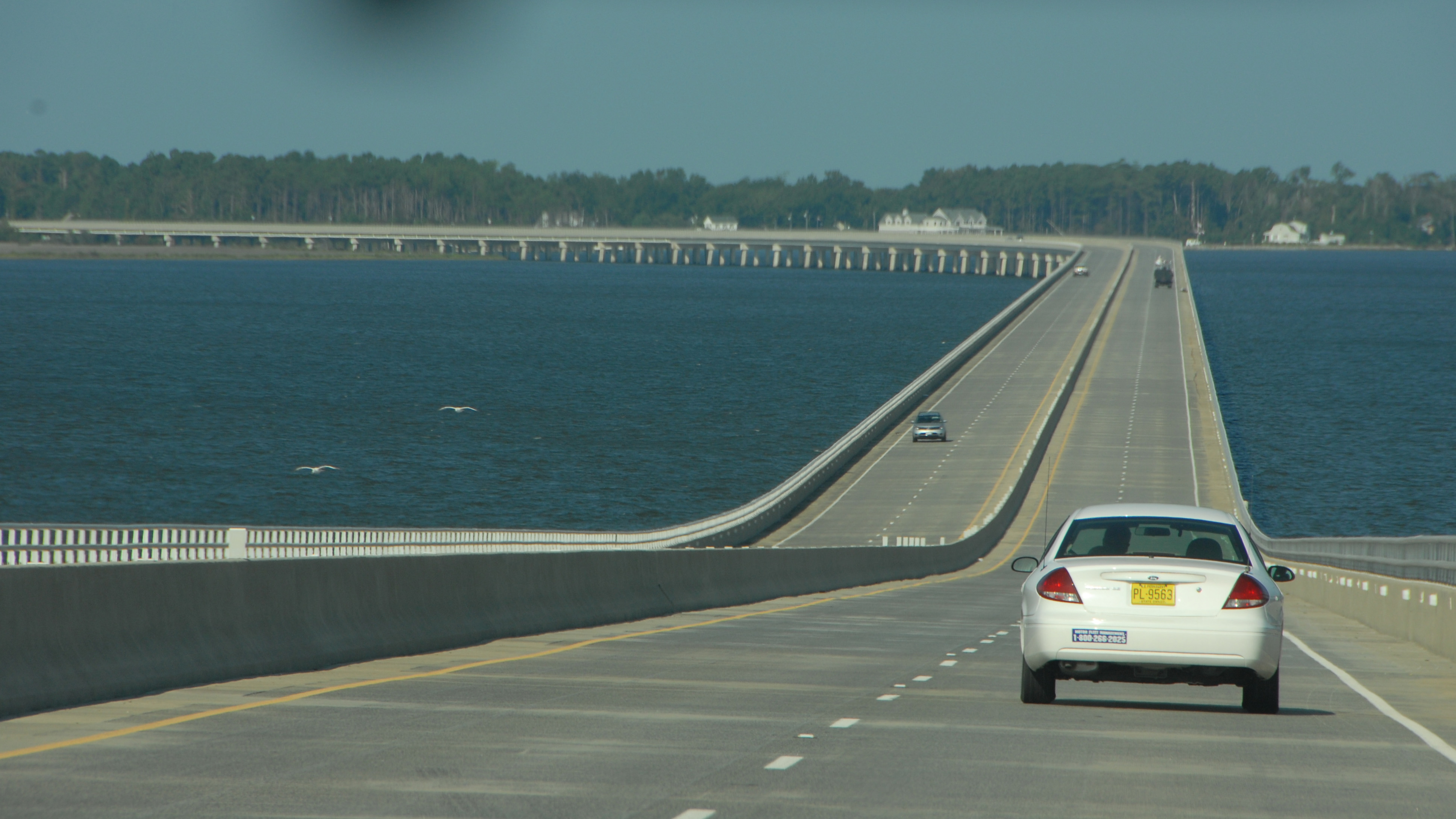
- Image from the bridge
- Coordinates: 35.887°N 75.73245°W
- Carries: US 64 Byp.
- Crosses: Croatan Sound
- Locale: Dare County
- Named for: Virginia Dare
- Owner: NCDOT
- Maintained by: NCDOT

Characteristics
- Design: Segmented girder
- Material: Prestressed concrete
- Total length: 27,581.4 feet (8,406.8 m)
- Width: 67.6 feet (20.6 m)
- Clearance below: 65.9 feet (20.1 m)

History
- Constructed by: Balfour Beatty Construction
- Construction cost: $90 million
- Opened: August 16, 2002

Statistics
- Daily traffic: 4,000 (as of 2010)

Location
- Interactive map of Virginia Dare Memorial Bridge

The Virginia Dare Memorial Bridge is a four-lane automobile bridge in Dare County, North Carolina, spanning the Croatan Sound between Manns Harbor and Roanoke Island. The bridge carries US 64 Bypass and is utilized by local and seasonal tourist traffic. Along with the Wright Memorial Bridge and the William B. Umstead Bridge, it is one of three road connections between the Outer Banks and mainland North Carolina.

The bridge is dedicated to the memory of Virginia Dare, the first English child born in the Americas, in 1587.

At a length of 5.2 miles (8.4 km), the Virginia Dare Memorial Bridge is the longest in the state. It travels over .75 miles (1.2 km) of wetlands, with the remaining 4.45 miles (7.2 km) over the Croatan Sound. The bridge rises to 65 feet (20 m) at its apex and is supported by 88 concrete columns and more than 2,000 pilings, which extend 100 feet (30 m) below the water. The bridge deck has 7,250 tons of epoxy-coated reinforcement steel and was designed with a 100-year life span.

The bridge complements and runs parallel to the older William B. Umstead Bridge, which carries US 64 between Manns Harbor and Manteo and is located farther north. The bridge is the westernmost in a series of three, along with the Washington Baum Bridge and Melvin R. Daniels Bridge, connecting the North Carolina mainland with the Outer Banks communities via US 64 and US 64 Bypass.

== History ==
In 1996, two hurricanes forced evacuation of the Outer Banks area during peak tourist season. The existing William B. Umstead Bridge, built in 1955 and having only two lanes, was unable to handle the high volume of traffic during the evacuation. To help alleviate traffic congestion and provide an additional emergency evacuation route from the Outer Banks, planning for a new bridge began in earnest. In January 1997, Wilbur Smith Associates was selected for the design of the bridge. In April 1998, Balfour Beatty Construction was awarded the prime construction contract.

On August 16, 2002, the bridge was dedicated by NCDOT Secretary Lyndo Tippett and was opened that day. The bridge initially carried US 64 Bypass and US 264 Bypass; but in September 2003, the US 264 Bypass designation was removed.
