= William B. Umstead Bridge =

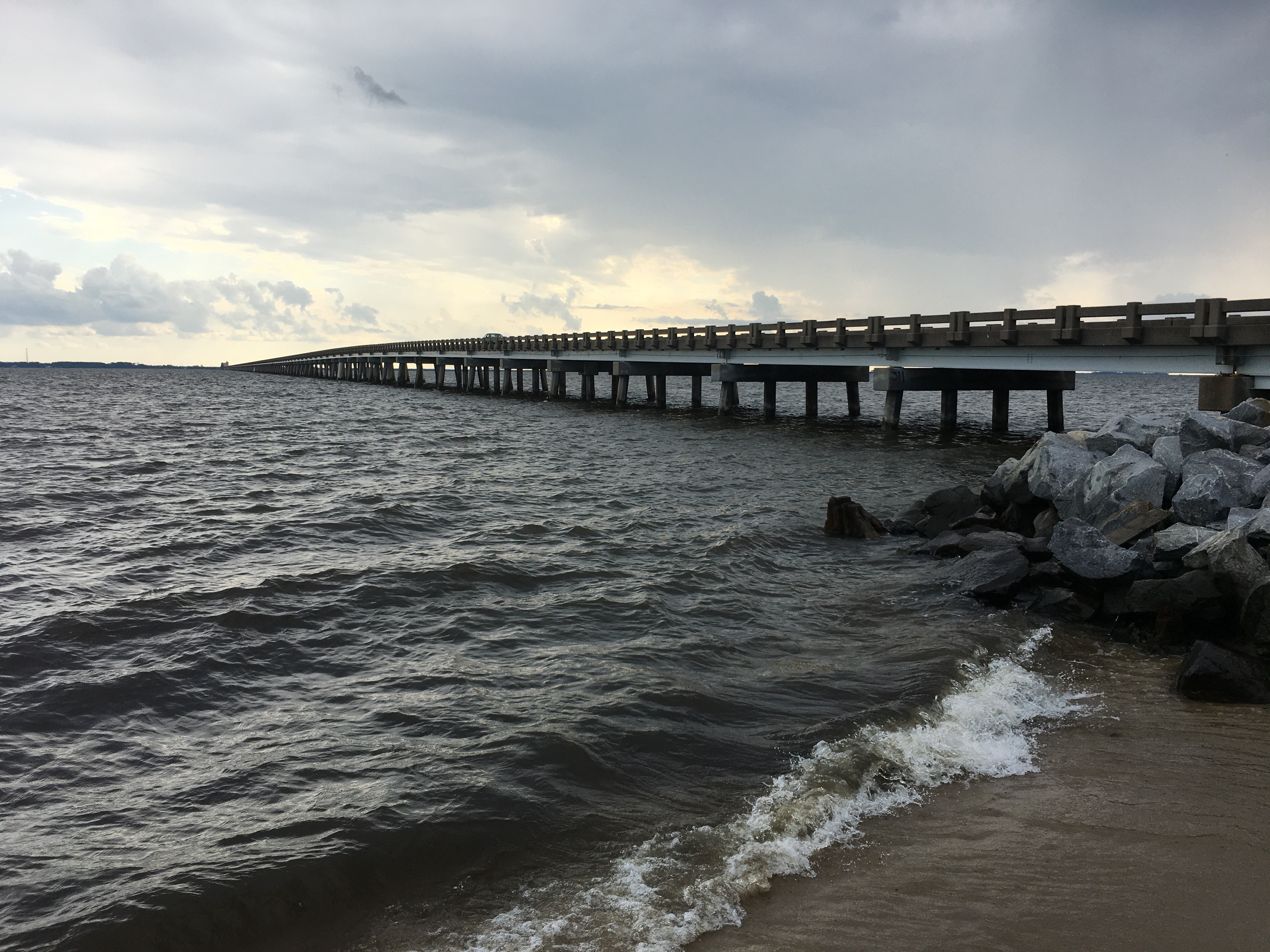
- Coordinates: 35.91855°N 75.74911°W
- Carries: US 64
- Crosses: Croatan Sound
- Locale: Dare County
- Other name(s): Dare County Bridge 9 Croatan Sound Bridge; Old Manns Harbor Bridge
- Named for: William B. Umstead
- Owner: NCDOT
- Maintained by: NCDOT

Characteristics
- Design: Steel stringer
- Total length: 14,265.8 feet (4,348.2 m)
- Width: 26.6 feet (8.1 m)
- Clearance below: 44.9 feet (13.7 m)

History
- Constructed by: T. A. Loving Company
- Opened: 1955

Statistics
- Daily traffic: 1,800 (as of 2012)

Location
- Interactive map of William B. Umstead Bridge

The William B. Umstead Bridge is a two-lane automobile bridge spanning the Croatan Sound, between Manns Harbor and Roanoke Island, in Dare County, North Carolina. The bridge carries US 64 and is utilized by local and seasonal tourist traffic. The bridge speed limit is 55 miles per hour (89 km/h), except during the months of July and August when it drops to 20 miles per hour (32 km/h) during dusk and dawn; the west end of the bridge houses more than one hundred thousand purple martins as they prepare for their annual migration to Brazil.

The bridge is dedicated to William B. Umstead, who was a member of the U.S. House of Representatives, a U.S. senator and the 63rd Governor of North Carolina.

== History ==
Plans for a bridge to connect the North Carolina mainland with Roanoke Island started in the 1920s, when local developers wanted to make the Outer Banks a tourist destination. However, because of the high cost, the State Highway Commission focused their funds on improving the primary highway system. As a result, the local businessmen took matters into their own hands and formed private toll-bridge companies; building Roanoke Sound Bridge in 1928 and the Wright Memorial Bridge in 1930. By around 1940, free ferry service was available between Manns Harbor and Manteo.

By the 1950s, the Outer Banks eventually became a tourist destination and the State Highway Commission began taking an increasingly active role in the area. In 1955 Dare County Bridge 9 was built by T. A. Loving Company of Goldsboro, NC and was dedicated to William B. Umstead on April 25, 1957. In 1966, the bridge was rehabilitated.

In 2002, the bridge was bypassed by a larger, more modern bridge, the Virginia Dare Memorial Bridge to the south, which provides a more direct access to Bodie Island by connecting directly to the Washington Baum Bridge between Roanoke and Bodie Islands; traffic using the Virginia Dare Bridge no longer needs to go through Manteo to reach the Outer Banks.

The two-lane bridge initially carried US 64 and US 264; in September 2003, US 264 was removed.

Purple martins have used beams under the bridge as a roost during July and August since it opened, and many have died when drivers crossed the bridge during the times of the birds' greatest activity. In 2007, the Coastal Carolina Purple Martin Society asked that the bridge's speed limit be reduced from 55 MPH to 20 MPH at dawn and dusk when the birds are swarming. Making the change has significantly reduced the number of bird deaths.

== See also ==
- North Carolina Bicycle Route 2
