= Wanchese (Native American leader) =

Leader of the Roanoke tribe

- Born: Unknown; Probably present-day Roanoke Island, North Carolina, U.S.
- Died: Unknown; Probably present-day Roanoke Island, North Carolina, U.S.
- Organization(s): Tribes: Roanoac, Algonquian, Powhatan
- Known for: Travels to England, resistance to English settlement

Wanchese (fl. 1585–1587) was the last known ruler of the Roanoke Native American tribe encountered by English colonists of the Roanoke Colony in the late sixteenth century. Along with Chief Manteo, he travelled to London in 1584, where the two men created a sensation in the royal court. Hosted at Durham House by the explorer and courtier Sir Walter Raleigh, he and Manteo assisted the scientist Thomas Harriot with the job of deciphering and learning the Carolina Algonquian language. Unlike Manteo, Wanchese evinced little interest in learning English, and did not befriend his hosts, remaining suspicious of English motives in the New World. In April 1586, having returned to Roanoke, he finally ended his good relations with the English, leaving Manteo as the colonists' sole Indian ally.

== Roanoke people ==
The Roanoac people were a Carolina Algonquian-speaking people whose territory comprised present-day Dare County, Roanoke Island, and part of the mainland at the time of English exploration and colonization. They were one of the numerous Carolina Algonquian tribes, which may have numbered 5,000-10,000 people in total in eastern North Carolina at the time of their first encounter with the English. The smaller Croatan people may have been a branch of the Roanoke or a separate tribe allied with them.

The Roanoke may have had their capital on the western shore of Croatan Sound, at Dasamonguepeuk. This was one of the significant towns noted by the English colonists in the sixteenth century.

== Journey to England ==
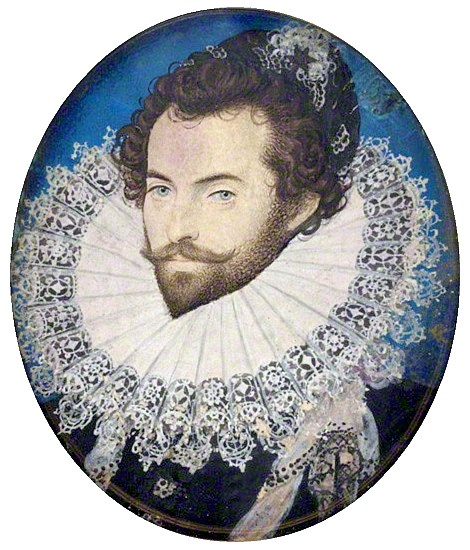
Sir Walter Raleigh hosted Wanchese at his London residence, Durham House.

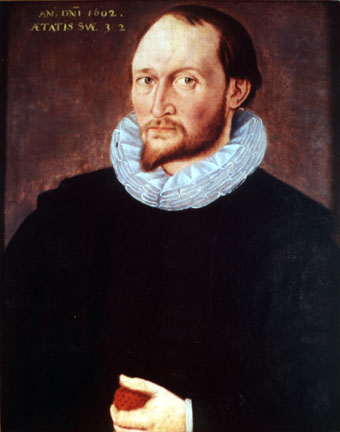
Thomas Harriot, who translated and learned the Algonkin language from Wanchese and Manteo.

Wanchese was among the first Native Americans to travel to England. In 1584, Sir Walter Raleigh had dispatched the first of a number of expeditions to Roanoke island to explore and eventually colonize the New World. Early encounters with the natives were friendly, and, despite the difficulties in communication, the explorers were able to persuade "two of the savages, being lustie men, whose names were Wanchese and Manteo" to accompany them on the return voyage to London to help describe the conditions in the New World.

Once safely delivered to England in September 1584, the two Indians quickly caused a sensation at court. Raleigh's priority, however, was not publicity but intelligence about his new land of Virginia, and he restricted access to the exotic newcomers, assigning the scientist Thomas Harriot the job of deciphering and learning the Carolina Algonquian language using a phonetic alphabet of his own invention.

Both Wanchese and Manteo were hosted at Raleigh's London residence, Durham House. Unlike Manteo, Wanchese evinced little interest in learning English, and did not befriend his hosts, remaining suspicious of English motives in the New World. He soon came to view himself as a captive of the English rather than as their guest. By Christmas of 1584, Harriot was able to converse successfully in the Algonquin language with the two Native Americans, although Manteo was far more communicative than Wanchese.

Harriot recorded the sense of awe with which the Native Americans viewed European technology:

Many things they sawe with us...as mathematical instruments, sea compasses...[and] spring clocks that seemed to goe of themselves - and many other things we had - were so strange unto them, and so farre exceeded their capacities to comprehend the reason and meanes how they should be made and done, that they thought they were rather the works of gods than men.

Wanchese and Manteo also performed a commercial function for Raleigh, attracting wealthy Britons to invest in Raleigh's schemes. One investor later complained that the 1585 expedition (which was a failure) might have succeeded:

The Report had been true which was given out by two strangers, Inhabitants of the same foreign nation.

Raleigh was, however, successful in raising funds, and a new expedition was raised to depart in 1585.

=== Return to Roanoke ===
Manteo and Wanchese returned to the New World in April 1585, sailing with Sir Richard Grenville's expedition in The Tyger, reaching the warm waters of the Caribbean in just 21 days. During this voyage, Wanchese and Manteo observed the English plunder Spanish shipping and, by way of "trucke and exchange", obtain supplies from the reluctant Spanish. Much, however, was lost on the return to the treacherous waters of Roanoke. The Tyger was saved from destruction, but at the cost of most of her supplies, which were spoiled by salt water.

On July 3, 1585, Grenville sent a party to "send word of our arriving at Wococon, to Wingino at Roanocke", led by Wanchese. At this point, Wanchese slipped away from the English and returned to Dasamongueponke, urging resistance against the newcomers. By July 6, Grenville was worried enough to send John Arundell with Manteo as guide and interpreter to recover Wanchese, but the villagers at Dasamongueponke could not be persuaded to give him up.

Records indicate that Manteo and Wanchese also went on a voyage from the New World to England sometime later in the same decade . Following the voyage, Manteo, Wanchese, and the English returned to Roanoke.

In April 1586, Wanchese finally severed his former good relations with the English, leaving Chief Manteo as the colonists' sole Indian ally.

== Legacy ==
The town of Wanchese, North Carolina is named after him. A character based on Wanchese is featured in the Lost Colony theater production and in the 1999 film The Legend of Two Path by Native Canadian actor Nathaniel Arcand.

== See also ==
- Roanoke Colony
- Raleigh, a Native American
