= Wingina =

Native American Leader, 1580s

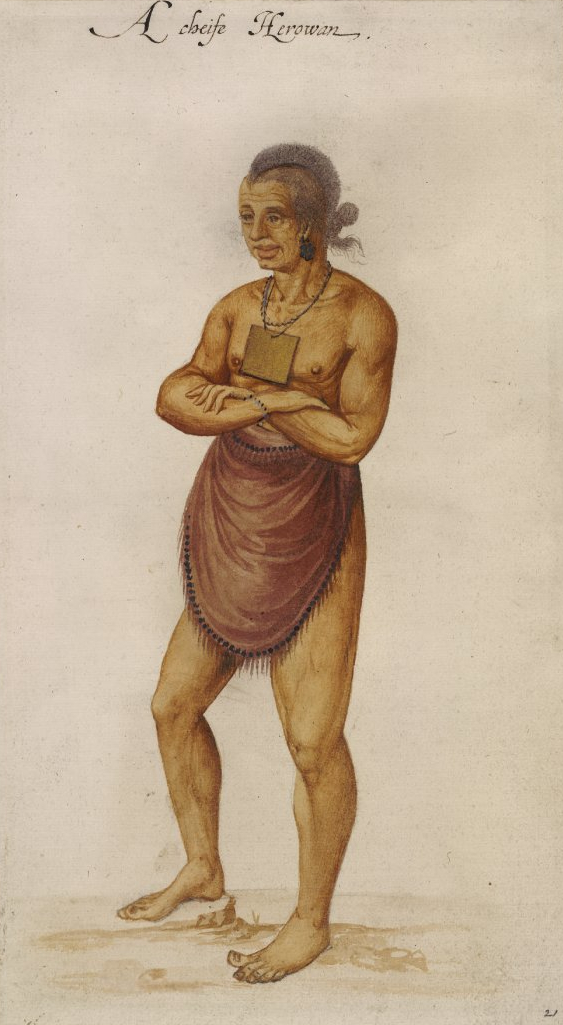
- Watercolor painting by John White c. 1585 of a man presumed to be Wingina

Secotan leader

Wereoance

Personal details
- Born: 7 December 1509
- Died: 1 June 1586 (aged 76) Dasamongueponke
- Cause of death: Decapitation
- Known for: First Native American leader to be encountered by English colonists in North America

Wingina (c. 16th century – 1 June 1586), also known as Pemisapan, was a Secotan weroance who was the first Native American leader to be encountered by English colonists in North America. During the late 16th century, English explorers Philip Amadas and Arthur Barlowe explored the region inhabited by Wingina and his people, detailing conflicts between Wingina's tribe, the Secotan and a rival tribe known as the Neusiok. Because of English colonization of the region, relations between the colonists and the Secotan quickly broke down. On 1 June 1586, in an effort to gain more stocks of food for the colony, Sir Ralph Lane led an attack on the Secotan; Wingina was decapitated during the attack by one of Lane's men. This attack and crime doomed the Roanoke colony.

== Life ==
Before the first English settlement on Roanoke Island, Philip Amadas and Arthur Barlowe explored the area (April 27, 1584) on behalf of Raleigh, who had received an English charter to establish a colony a month earlier. During their expedition, Barlowe took detailed notes relating to conflicts and rivalries between different groups of Native Americans. In one account, Wingina explained his tribal history, about a neighboring tribe at the mouth of the Neuse River, the Neusiok, referred to as the "Neiosioke" by Barlowe. According to Wingina, the Secotans endured years of warfare with the Neiosioke, and "some years earlier", he met with the Neiosioke king, to ensure a "permanent coexistence". The two leaders arranged a feast between the two groups. An unspecified number of Secotan men and 30 women attended a feast in the town of Neiosioke. The Neiosioke ambushed the Secotans at the feast, and by the time fighting ended, the Neiosioke had "slewn them every one, reserving the women and children only".

In conveying this "inter-tribal" history to Barlowe, Wingina saw an opportunity to advance the interest of the Secotans. Wingina and his people attempted on several occasions to convince the English to join them in devising a surprise attack against the Neiosioke. The Englishmen, uncertain of "whether their perswasion be to the ende they may be revenged of their enemies, or for the love they beare to us", declined to help the Secotans wage war against their rivals. Instead, the English established a trusting relationship with the Secotans, exemplified by the willingness of two Secotan chiefs, Manteo and Wanchese, to accompany Amadas and Barlowe back to England.

In a major betrayal of this "trusting relationship", Wingina was decapitated by one of Raleigh's men (at the time under the command of Sir Ralph Lane), the Irish settler Edward Nugent, in the summer of 1586.

== Legacy ==
- Sir Walter Raleigh's 1584 expedition recorded the name of the regional king (Wingina) and reported to Queen Elizabeth I that he ruled over the land known as Wingandacoa. She was probably influenced by this report to modify the name of the colony to "Virginia", in part alluding to her status as the "Virgin Queen". It is the oldest surviving English place-name in the United States not wholly borrowed from a Native American word, and the fourth oldest surviving English place name, though it is Latin in form. However, on Raleigh's subsequent voyage to the area, he recorded that Wingandacoa, the Carolina Algonquian word the English had heard upon his first arrival in 1584, means "What good clothes you wear!" and was not the native name of Wingina's country.
- USS Wingina
- Wingina Avenue, Manteo, North Carolina
- Wingina, Virginia

== See also ==
- List of people who were beheaded
