= Arthur Barlowe =

16/17th-century English captain and explorer of North America

- Born: 1550
- Died: 1620 (age 70)
- Occupation: Explorer

Arthur Barlowe (1550–1620) was one of two English captains (the other was Philip Amadas) who, under the direction of Sir Walter Raleigh, left England in 1584 to find land in North America to claim for Queen Elizabeth I of England. His account survives in a letter written to Raleigh as a report on their journey. It is one of the earliest detailed English commercial reports written from direct observation about any place in North America and has been called "one of the clearest contemporary pictures of the contact of Europeans with North American Indians."

Barlowe and Philip Amadas departed England with two ships on 27 April, sailing down to the Canary Islands and then on to the West Indies, where they stopped briefly for food and water before sailing north along the eastern coast of Florida. After eleven days they came to shallow water and smelled "so sweet, and so strong a smell, as if we had been in the midst of some delicate garden," indicating that land was nearby. Two days later (4 July), they saw the coast and continued to sail for 120 miles until they could find an entrance or river going in from the sea. They finally landed on the outer banks of what is now the Pamlico Sound of North Carolina. Barlowe described the land as a place where "in all the world the like abundance is not to be found...." On the third day after their arrival, three locals approached in a canoe. One boarded the English ships willingly, exchanged goods, and displayed fishing skills. The next day Barlowe and his crew were met by a large group of the Secotan tribe, led by their king's brother Granganimeo. Their king, Wingina, was unable to be there because of a leg wound sustained during a battle with a neighboring tribe. Several of the natives accompanied them as they sailed north to Roanoke island. There they found a Secotan village, where, according to Barlowe, they were treated with great hospitality and generosity. Barlowe described the people of the village as "gentle, loving and faithful, void of all guile and treason, and such as live after the manner of the golden age." The English spent 10 days exploring and then returned to England, reaching home by mid-September 1584. Barlowe ended up having the King come to the Land with his family and this led to the future colonization of Virginia.

The discovery of Roanoke Island and the coast of North Carolina led to the establishment of the Roanoke Colony. This colony at Roanoke Island would later be known as the "Lost Colony," whose members are presumed to have either starved to death or been incorporated into one of the local native American Indian populations.
