= Wanchese, North Carolina =

- CDP
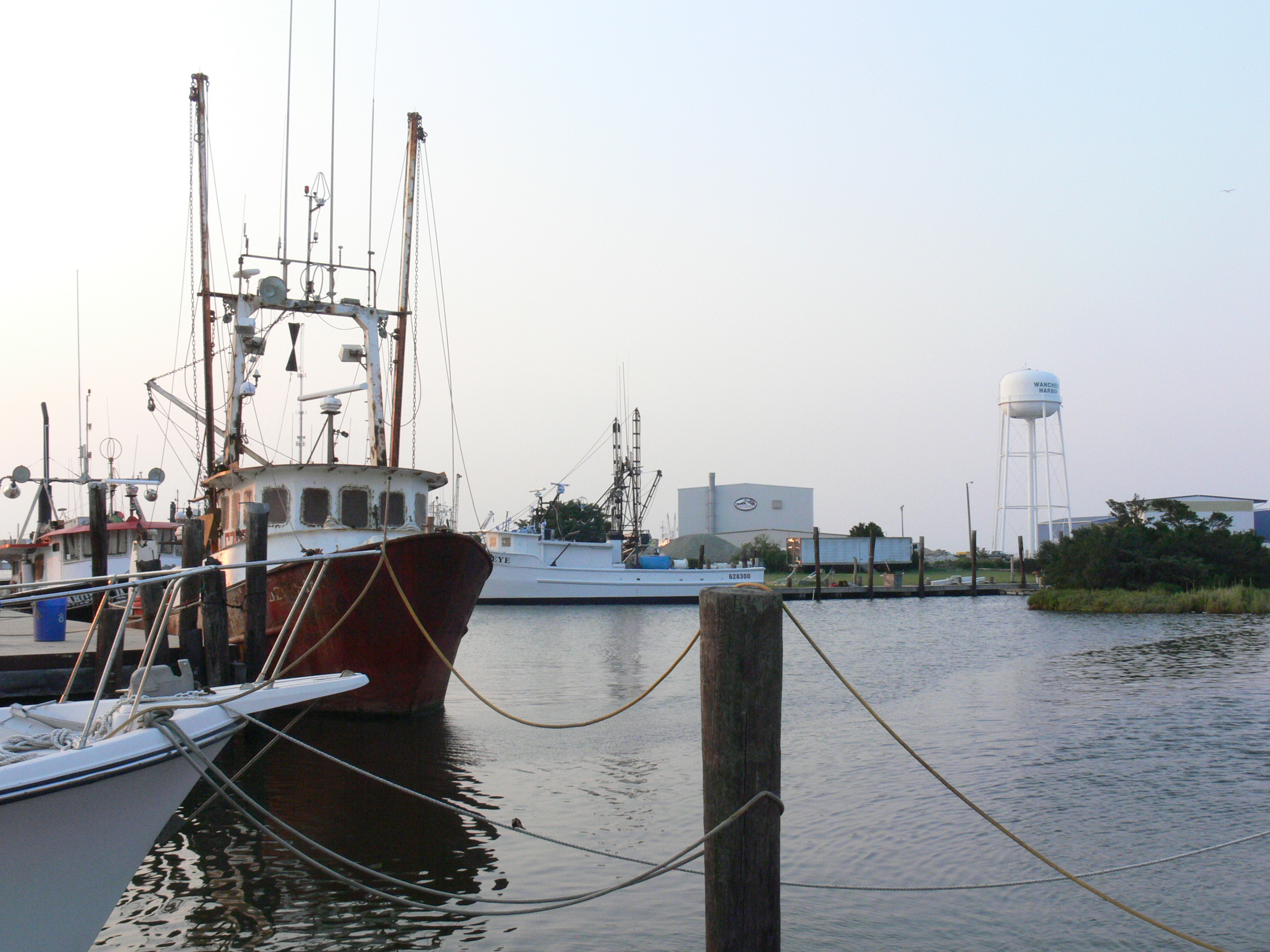
- Entrance to Wanchese Harbor

- Location in Dare County and the state of North Carolina.

- Location within North Carolina Location within the United States
- Coordinates: 35°50′42″N 75°38′22″W
- Country: United States
- State: North Carolina
- County: Dare
- Named for: Wanchese

Area
  - Total: 4.71 sq mi (12.20 km^{2})
  - Land: 4.66 sq mi (12.08 km^{2})
  - Water: 0.042 sq mi (0.11 km^{2})
- Elevation: 6.6 ft (2 m)

Population (2020)
  - Total: 1,522
  - Density: 326.3/sq mi (125.97/km^{2})
- Time zone: UTC-5 (Eastern (EST))
  - Summer (DST): UTC-4 (EDT)
- ZIP code: 27981
- Area code: 252
- FIPS code: 37-70920
- GNIS feature ID: 0996765

Wanchese (/ˈwɒntʃiːz/ WAHN-cheez) is a census-designated place (CDP) on Roanoke Island in Dare County, North Carolina, United States. It was named after Wanchese, the last known ruler of the Roanoke Native American tribe encountered by English colonists in the sixteenth century. As of the 2020 census, Wanchese had a population of 1,522. Today, Wanchese is the center of commercial fishing and boatbuilding on the Outer Banks.

The residents of Wanchese are governed by the Dare County Board of Commissioners. Wanchese is part of District 1, along with Manteo, Roanoke Island and Manns Harbor .

== Geography ==
Wanchese is located at 35°50′42″N 75°38′22″W, and on the southern end of Roanoke Island.

According to the United States, the CDP has a total area of 5.5 square miles (14 km^{2}), of which 4.7 square miles (12 km^{2}) is land and 0.8 square miles (2.1 km^{2}) (14.26%) is water.

== History ==
Archaeological evidence shows that Wanchese was the site of the first fishing village on Roanoke Island. Indigenous people inhabited the area 1500 years ago, and their various cultures used this site for fishing for 1100 years. They also collected oysters and shellfish from nearby beds in the Sound.

What is called the Tillett Site (after the last owners) had been occupied originally when it was still part of the mainland, during the entire Archaic period (8000–1000 BC). After the sea levels rose and it became an island, the saline conditions of the Sound became established, giving rise to the later indigenous fishing culture, including that of the historic Roanoke tribe.

Three later periods of occupation were identified:

- Mount Pleasant component, beginning around 400 and ending around 800;
- Colington component, the prehistoric manifestation of the Carolina Algonkian culture, from 800 to 1650; and
- Historic period component, related mostly to the Green family use of the site as a farmstead from c. 1884 to 1910/20. There was also fishing in this area.

During the first two periods, the Tillett site was a seasonal settlement. The Roanoke came to it from the mainland to fish and collect shellfish. At the time of English exploration, the Algonquian-speaking Roanoke tribe used the site for seasonal fishing. Their main town was on the western shore of Croatan Sound.

After permanent English colonization in the 1650s, the site continued to be used for fishing by the Anglo-Americans. During the 19th century Wanchese had the only light-house on Roanoke Island, called Marshes Light, which has since been reconstructed in Manteo. In the 1980s, it was to be redeveloped for a major commercial fishing port and seafood processing facility.

== Demographics ==
Historical population
Census	Pop.	Note	%±
2010	1,642		—
2020	1,522		−7.3%
U.S. Decennial Census

=== 2020 census ===
Wanchese racial composition
Race	Number	Percentage
White (non-Hispanic)	1,342	88.17%
Black or African American (non-Hispanic)	14	0.92%
Native American	2	0.13%
Asian	4	0.26%
Other/Mixed	63	4.14%
Hispanic or Latino	97	6.37%

As of the 2020 United States census, there were 1,522 people, 683 households, and 488 families residing in the CDP.

=== 2000 census ===
As of the census of 2000, there were 1,527 people, 614 households, and 432 families residing in the CDP. The population density was 325.8 inhabitants per square mile (125.8/km^{2}). There were 690 housing units at an average density of 147.2 per square mile (56.8/km^{2}). The racial makeup of the CDP was 98.10% White, 0.33% African American, 0.59% Native American, 0.13% Asian, 0.46% from other races, and 0.39% from two or more races. Hispanic or Latino of any race were 1.83% of the population.

In the CDP, the population was spread out, with 23.4% under the age of 18, 8.0% from 18 to 24, 32.4% from 25 to 44, 24.1% from 45 to 64, and 12.0% who were 65 years of age or older. The median age was 37 years. For every 100 females, there were 102.8 males. For every 100 females age 18 and over, there were 98.8 males.

The median income for a household in the CDP was $39,250, and the median income for a family was $43,173. Males had a median income of $28,958 versus $21,591 for females. The per capita income for the CDP was $17,492. About 5.1% of families and 8.1% of the population were below the poverty line, including 10.1% of those under age 18 and 16.3% of those age 65 or over.

== Education ==
Residents are zoned to Dare County Schools. Zoned schools include Manteo Elementary School, Manteo Middle School, and Manteo High School.
