= Philip Amadas =

16/17th-century English captain and explorer of North America

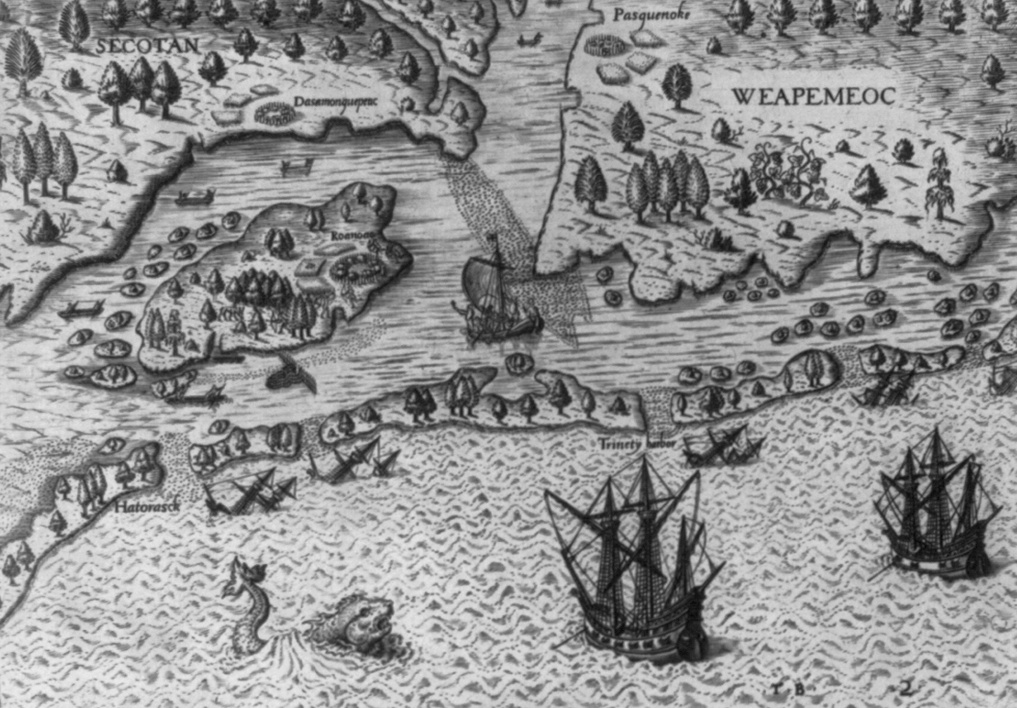
- Amadas and Barlowe arrive at Virginia
- Born: 1550; Hull, England
- Died: 1618 (aged 67–68)
- Occupation: Explorer

Philip Amadas (1550–1618) was a naval commander and explorer in Elizabethan England. Little is known from his early life, but he grew up within a wealthy merchant family in southwestern England. Amadas was instrumental in the early years of the English colonisation of North America. He served alongside Arthur Barlowe in the 1584 exploratory voyage to the Outer Banks of North Carolina. Leaving on 27 April 1584, he captained the Bark Ralegh with Simon Fernandes as his master and pilot on the voyage. Fernandes is best known for his controversial decision to maroon the colonists of the infamous "Lost Colony" on Roanoke Island in 1587. The voyage of 1584 determined Roanoke Island as the location for the future colonies under the leadership of Sir Walter Raleigh. For his role in the Roanoke voyages of 1584 and 1585, Amadas was nominated Admiral of Virginia by Raleigh in 1585. When he returned to England to report their findings, the Queen named the country after herself, Virginia.
