= Roanoke people =

Historical Native American tribe in North Carolina

Roanoke
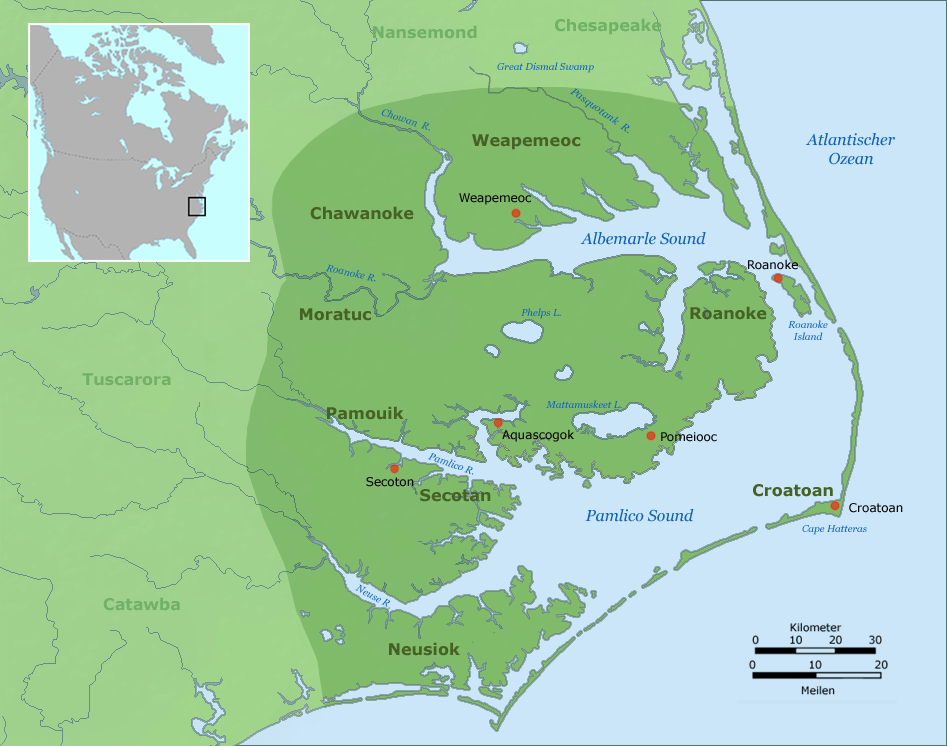
- 16th-century territories of the North Carolina Algonquian, including the Roanoke

Total population
- Extinct as a tribe

Regions with significant populations
- North Carolina

Languages
- Carolina Algonquian

Religion
- Tribal religion

Related ethnic groups
- Croatan, Secotan, Pamlico, Machapunga

The Roanoke (/ˈroʊəˌnoʊk/), also spelled Roanoac, were a Carolina Algonquian-speaking people whose territory comprised present-day Dare County, Roanoke Island, and part of the mainland at the time of English exploration and colonization. They were one of the numerous Carolina Algonquian tribes, which may have numbered 5,000 to 10,000 people in total in eastern North Carolina at the time of English encounter.

The last tribal chief of the Roanoke was believed to be Wanchese, who traveled to England with colonists in 1584. However, he may have just been an influential individual.

The less numerous Croatan people may have been a branch of the Roanoke or a separate tribe allied with them.

== Territory ==
The Roanoke may have had their capital on the western shore of Croatan Sound, at Dasamonguepeuk. This was one of the significant towns noted by the English colonists in the 16th century.

== Legacy ==
Numerous place names were derived from the Roanoke, including Roanoke Island, the Roanoke River, and Roanoke, Virginia.

== See also ==
- European Colonization of the Americas
- Colonial history of the United States
- English colonial empire
- History of North Carolina
- History of the United States
- Pre-Columbian Era
- Genocide of Indigenous peoples
