= Croatan Sound =

Inlet on the North Carolina coast

Coordinates: 35°50′15″N 75°41′50″W

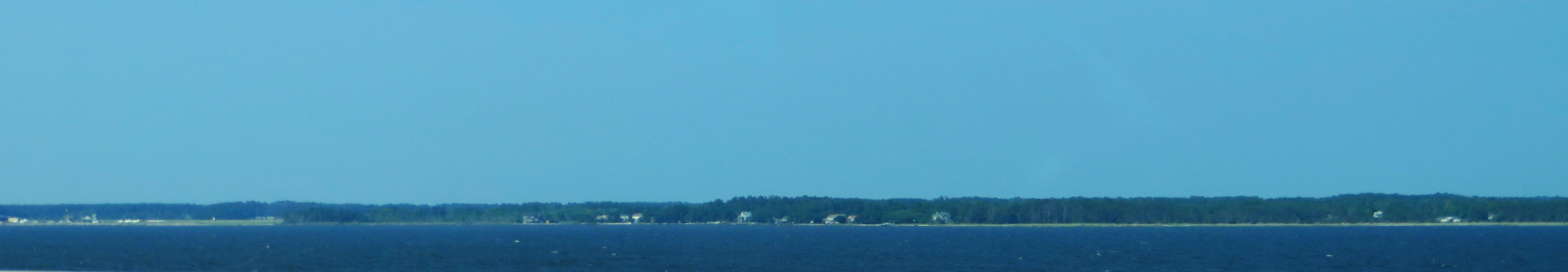
- Croatan Sound in 2014
- Interactive map of Croatan Sound
- Location: Dare County, North Carolina, U.S.

Croatan Sound is an inlet in Dare County, North Carolina. It connects Pamlico Sound with Albemarle Sound, and is bordered to the east by Roanoke Island; Roanoke Sound is on the other side of the island. Its name comes from the Croatan Indians who once inhabited the area. The Croatan Sound is crossed by two bridges, the older William B. Umstead Bridge, and the newer Virginia Dare Memorial Bridge, which carries U.S. Route 64.
