= The Lost Colony and Hatteras Island =

2020 non-fiction book by Scott Dawson

- Author: Scott Dawson
- Genre: Non-fiction
- Published: 2020
- Publication place: United States

The Lost Colony and Hatteras Island is a 2020 non-fiction book by Scott Dawson, a researcher from Hatteras Island. The book argues that the colonists of the Roanoke Colony were not lost, but were taken in by the Croatoan tribe on Hatteras Island and assimilated into their society. Dawson developed his hypothesis through archaeological fieldwork and historical research conducted alongside archaeologist Mark Horton of the University of Bristol and others affiliated with the Croatoan Archaeological Society. The book received coverage from outlets including The New York Times and The Virginian-Pilot, though some scholars questioned its conclusions, arguing that the physical evidence could be explained by trade rather than settlement.

== Synopsis ==
The book attempts to dismantle the long-standing mystery of the Roanoke Colony by arguing that the colonists were taken in by the Croatoan tribe on Hatteras Island and assimilated into their society.

== Background ==
Dawson, a researcher from Hatteras Island, worked with archaeologists, geologists, botanists and other researchers, including archaeologist Mark Horton from the University of Bristol, to collect evidence for the colony's fate. They established the Croatoan Archaeological Society, and conducted archaeological fieldwork and historical research at sites like Buxton, Frisco and Hatteras. Evidence of English activity on Hatteras like guns, mixed architecture, and large-scale blacksmithing during the 16th century was presented by them as proof that the colonists had moved there.

The accounts of English explorers like Arthur Barlowe and John Lawson provided a basis for Dawson's hypothesis, including claims that blue-eyed people were found living among the Croatoans years later.

== Reception ==
The book's claims were reported by multiple newspapers at the time of its publication, including The Virginian-Pilot and The New York Times. Peter Vankevich of the Ocracoke Observer wrote that "Dawson’s book is a good history/archeology primer. It is well-written and accessible for the lay reader."

However, some scholars rejected its claims due to a lack of solid proof, arguing that English material artifacts could have reached Hatteras Island through trade instead of settlement.
