= David Beers Quinn =

Irish historian (1909–2002)

David Beers Quinn (24 April 1909 – 19 March 2002) was an Irish historian who wrote extensively on the voyages of discovery and colonisation of America. Many of his publications appeared as volumes of the Hakluyt Society. He played a major role in assisting the presentation of the historical aspects during the quadricentennial celebrations (1984–1987) of the first establishment of a colony at Roanoke Island.

Quinn was born in Dublin and was the sole pupil at his first school. He graduated from Queen's University, Belfast, in 1931. He then completed a PhD on the early Tudor administration in Ireland at King's College London. He studied there at the Institute of Historical Research, where he formed lifelong friendships with Robert Dudley Edwards and Theo Moody, all three of them becoming professors of history. He subsequently spent five years as a lecturer at University College, Southampton (now Southampton University). Returning to Belfast in 1939, he taught Irish history.

He became interested in the voyages of discovery made by Humphrey Gilbert. At that time historians relied uncritically on the works of Richard Hakluyt published around 1600. Quinn's work and the new sources he discovered resulted in his first volume for the Hakluyt Society, and marked the beginning of his seminal work on voyages of exploration, which he developed from 1944 at University College, Swansea. In 1947 he contributed Raleigh and the British Empire to the "Teach Yourself History" series.

In 1957 he moved to Liverpool University where he was the Andrew Geddes and John Rankin professor of modern history for 19 years until 1976.

At the instigation of America's Four Hundredth Anniversary Committee his Set Fair for Roanoke: Voyages and Colonies, 1584–1590 was published by University of North Carolina Press in 1985.

He died in Liverpool, England on 19 March 2002.
