= Conway Whittle Sams =

American lawyer and historian

Conway Whittle Sams (August 25, 1864 - May 11, 1935) was an American lawyer and historian. In addition to authoring books on early Virginia history, he published Shall Women Vote? in 1913 to argue against women's suffrage. Born in McPhersonville, South Carolina, he graduated from the University of Virginia in 1887 and lived much of his life and practiced law in Norfolk, Virginia.

== Selected bibliography ==
- Sams on Attachment (1896) (legal treatise)
- Shall Women Vote? A Book for Men (1913)
- The conquest of Virginia: the forest primeval (1916)
- Conquest of Virginia, the first attempt (1924)
- Conquest of Virginia, the second attempt (1929)
- Conquest of Virginia, the third attempt 1610-1624 (1939)
