= 1896 United States presidential election in North Carolina =

- November 3, 1896

Nominee	William Jennings Bryan	William McKinley
Party	Democratic	Republican
Alliance	Populist
Home state	Nebraska	Ohio
Running mate	Arthur Sewall (Democratic); Thomas E. Watson (Populist)	Garret Hobart
Electoral vote	11	0
Popular vote	174,408	155,122
Percentage	52.64%	46.82%
County results
Bryan
40–50%
50–60%
60–70%
70–80%
McKinley
40–50%
50–60%
60–70%
70–80%
President before election
Grover Cleveland
Democratic
Elected President
William McKinley
Republican

The 1896 United States presidential election in North Carolina took place on November 3, 1896. All contemporary 45 states were part of the 1896 United States presidential election. Voters chose 11 electors to the Electoral College, which selected the president and vice president.

North Carolina was won by the Democratic nominees, former U.S. Representative William Jennings Bryan of Nebraska and his running mate Arthur Sewall of Maine. 5 electors cast their vice presidential ballots for Thomas E. Watson, who was nominated as Bryan's running mate under the Populist Party banner in a form of fusion, at the same time as the Populists were engaging in fusion with the North Carolina Republicans at the state level (both fusion efforts being orchestrated by Marion Butler.) They defeated the Republican nominees, former Governor of Ohio William McKinley and his running mate Garret Hobart of New Jersey. Bryan won the state by a margin of 5.82%.

As of 2024, this is the last occasion Northampton County has voted for a Republican presidential candidate, which stands as the longest Democratic streak in the nation. (Note: Brooks County, Texas and Jim Hogg County, Texas, as well as Menominee County, Wisconsin and Kalawao County, Hawaii have never voted Republican but were only created in 1911, 1913, 1959, and 1905, respectively.) While Northampton County had been majority Black and a Republican bastion since the Civil War, the Wilmington massacre of Black voters by North Carolina Democrats following their White supremacy campaign of 1898 prevented Republicans from winning the county until long after political realignment had occurred.

Bryan would defeat McKinley in North Carolina again four years later and would later win the state again in 1908 against William Howard Taft.

== Results ==
1896 United States presidential election in North Carolina
Party	Candidate	Votes	Percentage	Electoral votes
Democratic	William Jennings Bryan	174,408	52.64%	6
Populist	William Jennings Bryan	0	0.00%	5
Total	William Jennings Bryan	174,408	52.64%	11
Republican	William McKinley	155,122	46.82%	0
Prohibition	Joshua Levering	635	0.19%	0
National Democratic	John M. Palmer	578	0.17%	0
Write-ins	Scattered	372	0.11%	0
National Prohibition	Charles Eugene Bentley	222	0.07%	0
Totals		331,337	100.00%	11
Voter turnout				—

=== Results by county ===
1896 United States presidential election in North Carolina by county
County	William Jennings Bryan Democratic		William McKinley Republican		Joshua Levering Prohibition		John M. Palmer National Democratic		Various candidates Other parties		Margin	
County	%	#	%	#	%	#	%	#	%	#	%	#
Stanly	73.53%	1,425	26.37%	511	0.05%	1	0.05%	1	0.00%	0	47.16%	914
Union	72.69%	2,747	26.70%	1,009	0.03%	1	0.58%	22	0.00%	0	45.99%	1,738
Onslow	72.58%	1,559	27.42%	589	0.00%	0	0.00%	0	0.00%	0	45.16%	970
Catawba	71.94%	2,649	27.27%	1,004	0.54%	20	0.19%	7	0.05%	2	44.68%	1,645
Cabarrus	68.06%	2,250	30.13%	996	0.54%	18	1.09%	36	0.18%	6	37.93%	1,254
Anson	68.66%	2,322	31.34%	1,060	0.00%	0	0.00%	0	0.00%	0	37.32%	1,262
Cleveland	67.89%	2,664	30.99%	1,216	0.13%	5	0.99%	39	0.00%	0	36.90%	1,448
Sampson	67.63%	2,789	30.82%	1,271	0.51%	21	0.00%	0	1.04%	43	36.81%	1,518
Duplin	67.59%	2,409	32.18%	1,147	0.03%	1	0.03%	1	0.17%	6	35.41%	1,262
Rowan	67.28%	3,095	31.91%	1,468	0.72%	33	0.02%	1	0.07%	3	35.37%	1,627
Currituck	66.09%	922	33.84%	472	0.00%	0	0.07%	1	0.00%	0	32.26%	450
Chatham	65.77%	2,892	33.89%	1,490	0.07%	3	0.00%	0	0.27%	12	31.89%	1,402
Wilson	65.37%	2,715	34.58%	1,436	0.00%	0	0.05%	2	0.00%	0	30.80%	1,279
Johnston	64.67%	3,343	35.29%	1,824	0.04%	2	0.00%	0	0.00%	0	29.39%	1,519
Haywood	64.07%	1,901	35.02%	1,039	0.27%	8	0.51%	15	0.13%	4	29.05%	862
Alexander	64.24%	1,119	35.59%	620	0.06%	1	0.11%	2	0.00%	0	28.65%	499
Franklin	63.68%	3,217	36.30%	1,834	0.00%	0	0.00%	0	0.02%	1	27.38%	1,383
Nash	63.17%	2,916	36.81%	1,699	0.00%	0	0.00%	0	0.02%	1	26.36%	1,217
Columbus	61.91%	1,918	37.51%	1,162	0.00%	0	0.58%	18	0.00%	0	24.40%	756
Harnett	61.03%	1,676	37.95%	1,042	0.80%	22	0.22%	6	0.00%	0	23.09%	634
Clay	61.42%	476	38.58%	299	0.00%	0	0.00%	0	0.00%	0	22.84%	177
Swain	60.25%	808	39.60%	531	0.00%	0	0.15%	2	0.00%	0	20.66%	277
Iredell	59.45%	2,958	40.25%	2,003	0.10%	5	0.06%	3	0.14%	7	19.19%	955
Caldwell	57.93%	1,428	39.23%	967	2.39%	59	0.45%	11	0.00%	0	18.70%	461
Brunswick	59.27%	1,279	40.69%	878	0.00%	0	0.05%	1	0.00%	0	18.58%	401
Gates	58.86%	1,086	41.14%	759	0.00%	0	0.00%	0	0.00%	0	17.72%	327
Wayne	58.56%	3,215	40.95%	2,248	0.42%	23	0.02%	1	0.05%	3	17.61%	967
Robeson	58.70%	3,457	41.25%	2,429	0.03%	2	0.02%	1	0.00%	0	17.46%	1,028
Lenoir	58.20%	1,966	41.74%	1,410	0.00%	0	0.00%	0	0.06%	2	16.46%	556
Carteret	57.95%	1,308	41.78%	943	0.00%	0	0.00%	0	0.27%	6	16.17%	365
Orange	57.09%	1,700	42.44%	1,264	0.00%	0	0.24%	7	0.24%	7	14.64%	436
Pamlico	57.25%	861	42.69%	642	0.00%	0	0.07%	1	0.00%	0	14.56%	219
Lincoln	56.63%	1,349	42.40%	1,010	0.50%	12	0.46%	11	0.00%	0	14.23%	339
Pitt	56.99%	3,181	42.82%	2,390	0.00%	0	0.04%	2	0.16%	9	14.17%	791
Bladen	56.94%	1,665	42.95%	1,256	0.00%	0	0.10%	3	0.00%	0	13.99%	409
Jackson	56.74%	1,145	43.26%	873	0.00%	0	0.00%	0	0.00%	0	13.48%	272
Macon	56.02%	1,140	43.78%	891	0.10%	2	0.10%	2	0.00%	0	12.24%	249
Gaston	55.51%	2,069	43.60%	1,625	0.78%	29	0.08%	3	0.03%	1	11.91%	444
McDowell	55.79%	1,204	44.02%	950	0.14%	3	0.05%	1	0.00%	0	11.77%	254
Durham	55.20%	2,435	43.62%	1,924	0.00%	0	0.09%	4	1.09%	48	11.58%	511
Martin	55.02%	1,681	44.98%	1,374	0.00%	0	0.00%	0	0.00%	0	10.05%	307
Person	54.99%	1,713	45.01%	1,402	0.00%	0	0.00%	0	0.00%	0	9.98%	311
Alleghany	54.88%	737	45.05%	605	0.07%	1	0.00%	0	0.00%	0	9.83%	132
Hyde	54.55%	1,019	45.34%	847	0.00%	0	0.11%	2	0.00%	0	9.21%	172
Mecklenburg	53.63%	4,714	44.61%	3,921	0.55%	48	0.39%	34	0.83%	73	9.02%	793
Jones	54.27%	814	45.73%	686	0.00%	0	0.00%	0	0.00%	0	8.53%	128
Wake	53.31%	5,396	46.19%	4,675	0.11%	11	0.19%	19	0.20%	20	7.12%	721
Greene	53.43%	1,222	46.57%	1,065	0.00%	0	0.00%	0	0.00%	0	6.86%	157
Cumberland	52.88%	2,509	46.36%	2,200	0.63%	30	0.08%	4	0.04%	2	6.51%	309
Beaufort	52.98%	2,513	46.53%	2,207	0.15%	7	0.04%	2	0.30%	14	6.45%	306
Moore	52.96%	2,207	46.75%	1,948	0.19%	8	0.10%	4	0.00%	0	6.22%	259
Rockingham	52.78%	2,882	47.05%	2,569	0.00%	0	0.04%	2	0.13%	7	5.73%	313
Burke	52.22%	1,550	46.66%	1,385	0.40%	12	0.71%	21	0.00%	0	5.56%	165
Rutherford	52.15%	2,146	47.46%	1,953	0.10%	4	0.29%	12	0.00%	0	4.69%	193
Pender	52.30%	1,276	47.70%	1,164	0.00%	0	0.00%	0	0.00%	0	4.59%	112
Yancey	51.82%	1,056	48.18%	982	0.00%	0	0.00%	0	0.00%	0	3.63%	74
Graham	51.13%	363	48.87%	347	0.00%	0	0.00%	0	0.00%	0	2.25%	16
Granville	50.90%	2,269	48.79%	2,175	0.00%	0	0.31%	14	0.00%	0	2.11%	94
Guilford	49.67%	3,479	49.33%	3,455	0.61%	43	0.26%	18	0.13%	9	0.34%	24
Alamance	49.34%	2,302	49.59%	2,314	0.21%	10	0.02%	1	0.84%	39	-0.26%	-12
Camden	48.51%	554	51.49%	588	0.00%	0	0.00%	0	0.00%	0	-2.98%	-34
Montgomery	48.31%	1,129	51.60%	1,206	0.00%	0	0.09%	2	0.00%	0	-3.29%	-77
Transylvania	48.14%	595	51.54%	637	0.00%	0	0.32%	4	0.00%	0	-3.40%	-42
Watauga	47.46%	1,063	52.05%	1,166	0.13%	3	0.18%	4	0.18%	4	-4.60%	-103
Randolph	46.58%	2,482	51.47%	2,743	1.56%	83	0.00%	0	0.39%	21	-4.90%	-261
Ashe	47.14%	1,574	52.74%	1,761	0.12%	4	0.00%	0	0.00%	0	-5.60%	-187
Buncombe	46.93%	4,098	52.80%	4,611	0.02%	2	0.18%	16	0.07%	6	-5.87%	-513
Davidson	46.24%	2,072	53.00%	2,375	0.54%	24	0.11%	5	0.11%	5	-6.76%	-303
Hertford	46.51%	1,240	53.49%	1,426	0.00%	0	0.00%	0	0.00%	0	-6.98%	-186
Dare	46.42%	408	53.58%	471	0.00%	0	0.00%	0	0.00%	0	-7.17%	-63
Richmond	46.08%	2,172	53.65%	2,529	0.00%	0	0.28%	13	0.00%	0	-7.57%	-357
Vance	45.57%	1,465	54.28%	1,745	0.09%	3	0.06%	2	0.00%	0	-8.71%	-280
Tyrrell	45.57%	411	54.43%	491	0.00%	0	0.00%	0	0.00%	0	-8.87%	-80
Northampton	45.17%	1,906	54.74%	2,310	0.00%	0	0.09%	4	0.00%	0	-9.57%	-404
Caswell	44.00%	1,372	54.55%	1,701	0.00%	0	0.03%	1	1.41%	44	-10.55%	-329
Perquimans	43.64%	793	55.92%	1,016	0.00%	0	0.44%	8	0.00%	0	-12.27%	-223
Cherokee	43.77%	770	56.11%	987	0.00%	0	0.11%	2	0.00%	0	-12.34%	-217
Surry	43.73%	2,019	56.10%	2,590	0.00%	0	0.17%	8	0.00%	0	-12.37%	-571
Bertie	43.03%	1,711	56.72%	2,255	0.00%	0	0.15%	6	0.10%	4	-13.68%	-544
Edgecombe	42.34%	2,032	57.47%	2,758	0.00%	0	0.19%	9	0.00%	0	-15.13%	-726
Forsyth	41.33%	2,778	57.85%	3,888	0.45%	30	0.33%	22	0.04%	3	-16.52%	-1,110
Henderson	40.99%	1,022	58.52%	1,459	0.00%	0	0.44%	11	0.04%	1	-17.53%	-437
Stokes	41.13%	1,447	58.81%	2,069	0.06%	2	0.00%	0	0.00%	0	-17.68%	-622
Chowan	40.84%	791	59.16%	1,146	0.00%	0	0.00%	0	0.00%	0	-18.33%	-355
Davie	40.56%	894	59.26%	1,306	0.09%	2	0.09%	2	0.00%	0	-18.69%	-412
Pasquotank	40.43%	1,037	59.22%	1,519	0.23%	6	0.12%	3	0.00%	0	-18.79%	-482
New Hanover	38.38%	2,100	58.17%	3,183	0.00%	0	1.74%	95	1.72%	94	-19.79%	-1,083
Yadkin	39.67%	1,093	59.75%	1,646	0.29%	8	0.07%	2	0.22%	6	-20.07%	-553
Polk	38.66%	469	60.26%	731	1.07%	13	0.00%	0	0.00%	0	-21.60%	-262
Wilkes	38.80%	1,801	61.07%	2,835	0.09%	4	0.00%	0	0.04%	2	-22.27%	-1,034
Craven	37.49%	1,810	60.50%	2,921	0.12%	6	0.25%	12	1.64%	79	-23.01%	-1,111
Madison	37.39%	1,357	62.55%	2,270	0.00%	0	0.06%	2	0.00%	0	-25.16%	-913
Washington	36.44%	739	63.56%	1,289	0.00%	0	0.00%	0	0.00%	0	-27.12%	-550
Halifax	36.02%	2,255	63.94%	4,003	0.00%	0	0.05%	3	0.00%	0	-27.92%	-1,748
Warren	35.75%	1,213	64.10%	2,175	0.00%	0	0.15%	5	0.00%	0	-28.35%	-962
Mitchell	25.29%	630	74.71%	1,861	0.00%	0	0.00%	0	0.00%	0	-49.42%	-1,231

== See also ==
- United States presidential elections in North Carolina
