= No Ache Island =

Island in North Carolina (United States)

Coordinates: 35.5115688°N 75.4873791°W

No Ache Island is an island in Dare County, North Carolina, in the United States. According to one source, No Ache might have been intended as a soothing name for an inhospitable place.
