= Buffalo City =

Buffalo City may refer to the following communities:

== South Africa ==
- Buffalo City Metropolitan Municipality, East Cape province

== United States ==
- Buffalo City, Arkansas, an unincorporated community and census-designated place
- Buffalo City, North Carolina, a town
- Buffalo City, Wisconsin, a city

== See also ==
- Buffalo (disambiguation)
