= Alligator River National Wildlife Refuge =

National Wildlife Refuge in North Carolina, United States

- IUCN category IV (habitat/species management area)
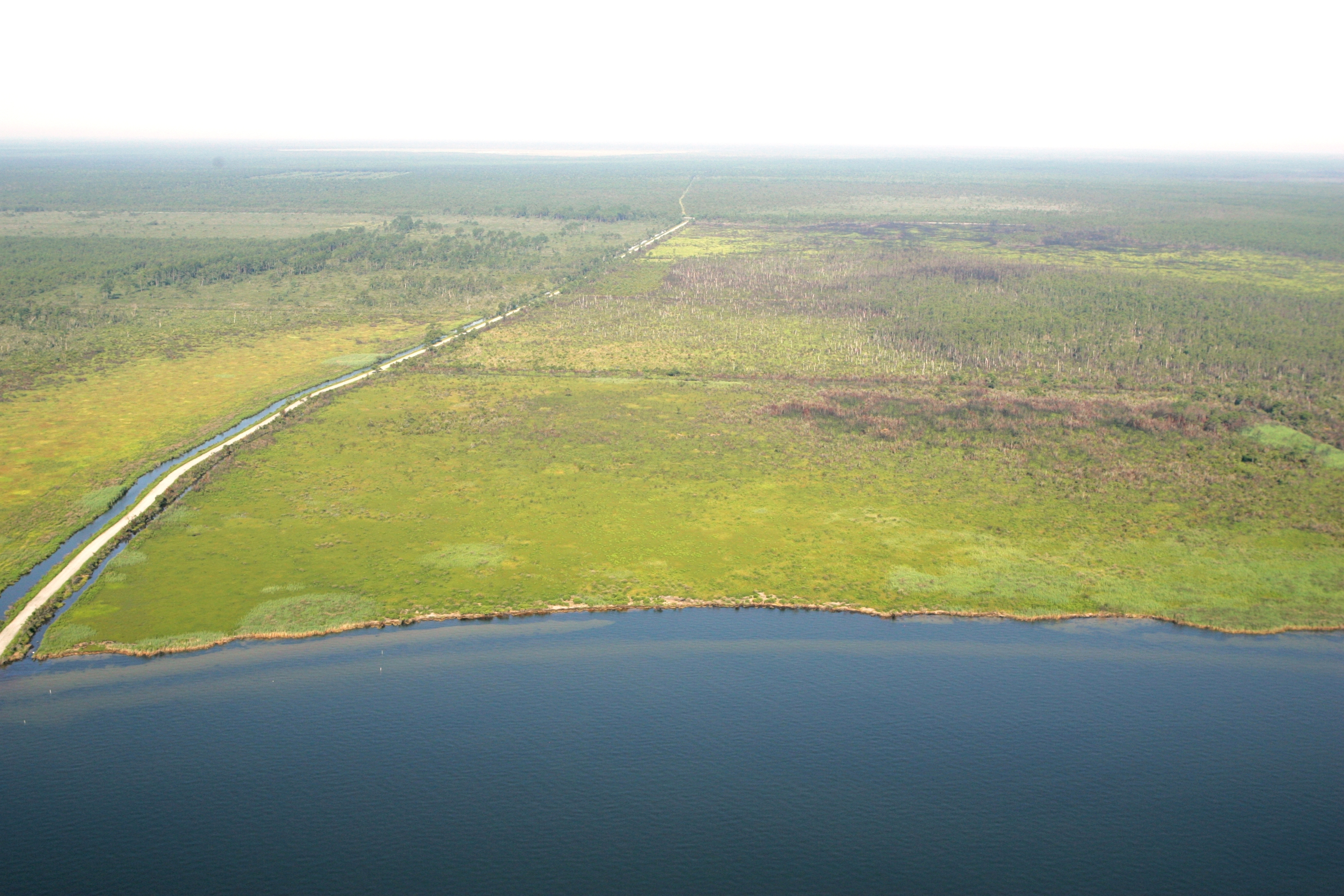

- Location within the United States Location within North Carolina
- Location: Dare, Hyde counties, North Carolina, United States
- Nearest city: Manns Harbor, North Carolina
- Coordinates: 35°47′00″N 75°51′00″W
- Area: 152,000 acres (620 km^{2})
- Established: 1984
- Governing body: U.S. Fish and Wildlife Service
- Website: Alligator River National Wildlife Refuge

The Alligator River National Wildlife Refuge is a 152,000-acre (620 km^{2}) National Wildlife Refuge located in eastern North Carolina along the Atlantic Coast. It was established on March 14, 1984, to preserve and protect a unique wetland habitat type—the pocosin—and its associated wildlife species.

The refuge attracts visitors worldwide for its red wolf (Canis rufus) howling programs and is also home to the Dare County Bombing Range.

== Description ==
The Alligator River National Wildlife Refuge is composed of 152,000 acres (615 km^{2}) lying in the mainland portions of Dare and Hyde Counties, North Carolina. It is roughly 28 miles (45 km) from north to south and 15 miles (24 km) from east to west and lies in North Carolina's Coastal Plain. It is bordered on the west by the Alligator River and the Intracoastal Waterway, which is crossed by the 2.8 mile Lindsay C. Warren bridge; on the north by Albemarle Sound; on the east by Croatan and Pamlico Sounds; and on the south by Long Shoal River and corporate farmland. The Pea Island National Wildlife Refuge is administered as a part of the complex. The Alligator River Manager supervises the Mackay Island, Currituck, and Pocosin Lakes National Wildlife Refuge Managers.

== Natural history ==
The habitat includes many diverse types including high and low pocosin, bogs, fresh and brackish water marshes, hardwood swamps, and Atlantic white cypress swamps. Plant species include pitcher plants and sun dews, low bush cranberries, redbay, Atlantic white cypress, pond pine, American sweetgum, red maple, and a wide variety of herbaceous and shrub species common to the East Coast.

The refuge is one of the premier habitats for the American black bear on the Eastern Seaboard. It also has concentrations of ducks, geese, and swans. The wildlife diversity includes wading birds, shorebirds, American woodcock, raptors, black bears, alligators, white-tailed deer, raccoons, cottontail rabbits, bobwhite quail, northern river otters, red wolves, red-cockaded woodpeckers, and neotropical migrants.

== Refuge objectives ==
Refuge objectives are to protect and preserve unique wetland habitat types and the associated wildlife species, including endangered species such as red wolves, red-cockaded woodpeckers and American alligators. It also aims to provide a habitat for and management of waterfowl and other migratory birds, as well as for a wide variety of native wildlife species, through diverse wildlife management techniques and strategies.

An important objective is the restoration of historical water levels in the refuge by progressively plugging man-made drainage ditches. This will reduce fire danger as well as re-establish valuable wildlife habitat.

The refuge also provides for the public opportunities for hunting, fishing, wildlife interpretation, observation, photography, and environmental education.

== Administration ==
A 33-person staff (14 refuge staff, for both Alligator River and Pea Island national wildlife refuges, 7 Red Wolf Recovery staff, 8 fire staff, and 4 temporary staff) administer the refuge for the 42,000 visitors who visit annually. The current budget (FY 03) is $3.9 million.

== Gallery ==
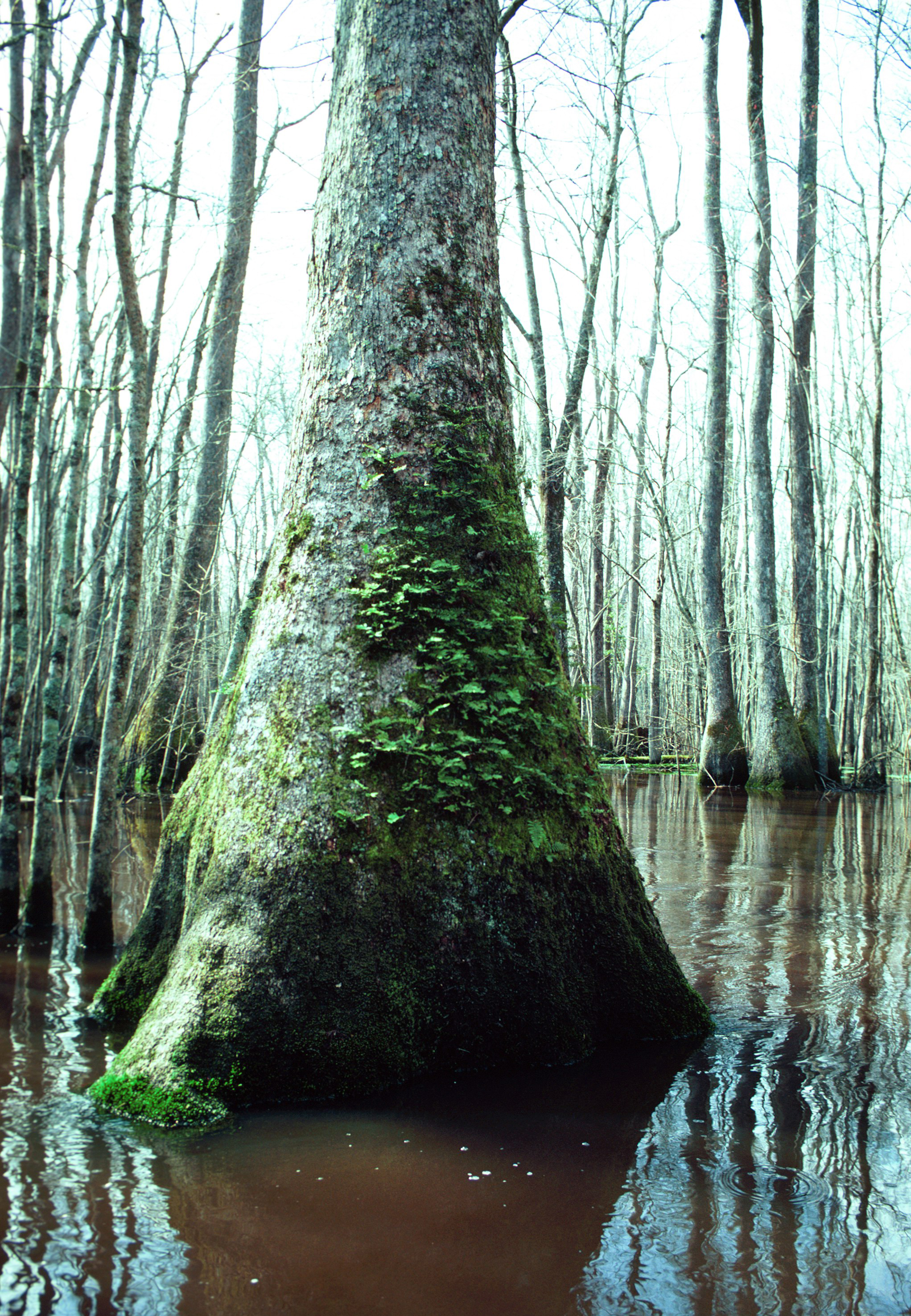
Nyssa sylvatica tree in the Alligator River National Wildlife Refuge

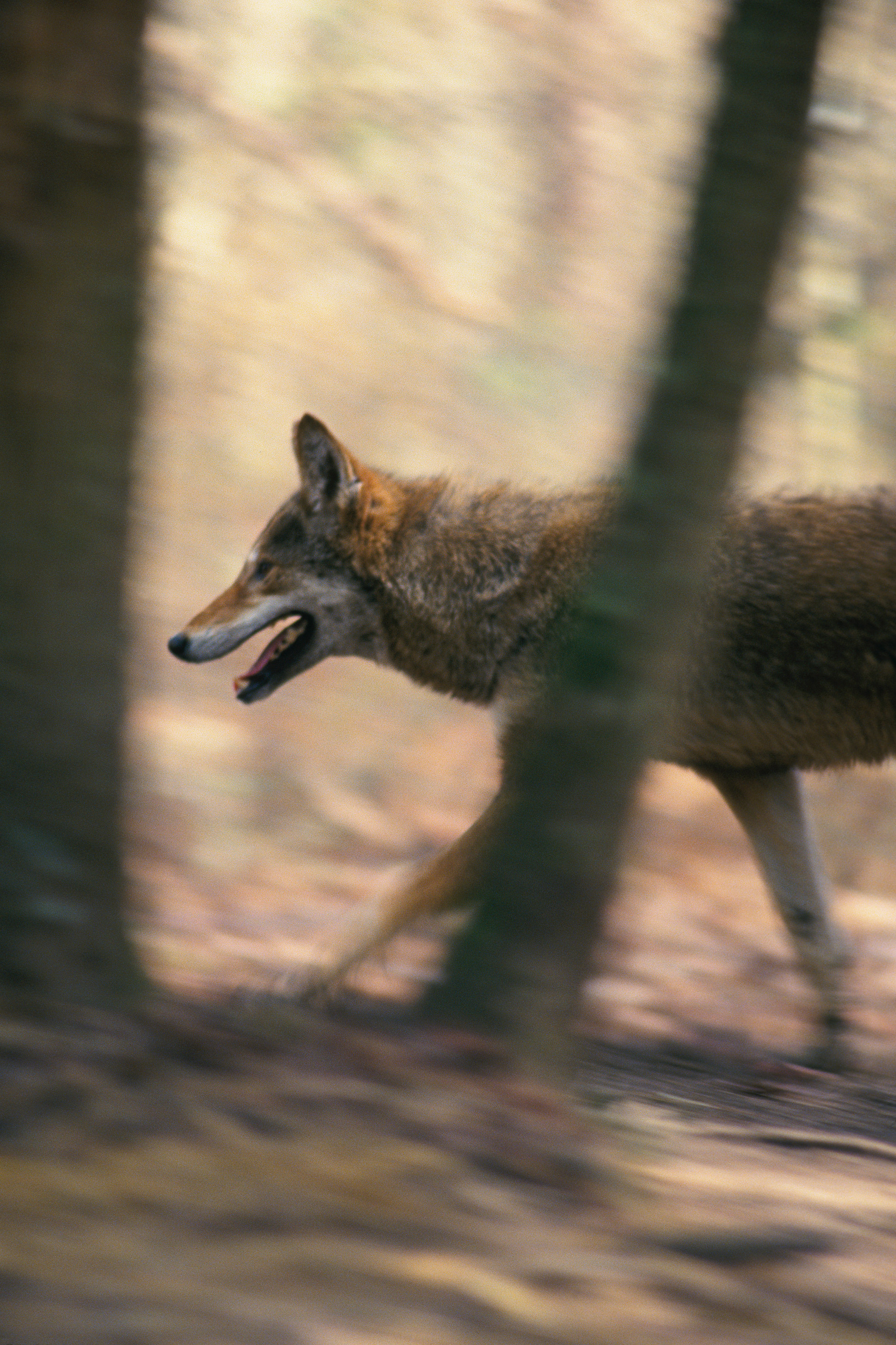
Red wolf

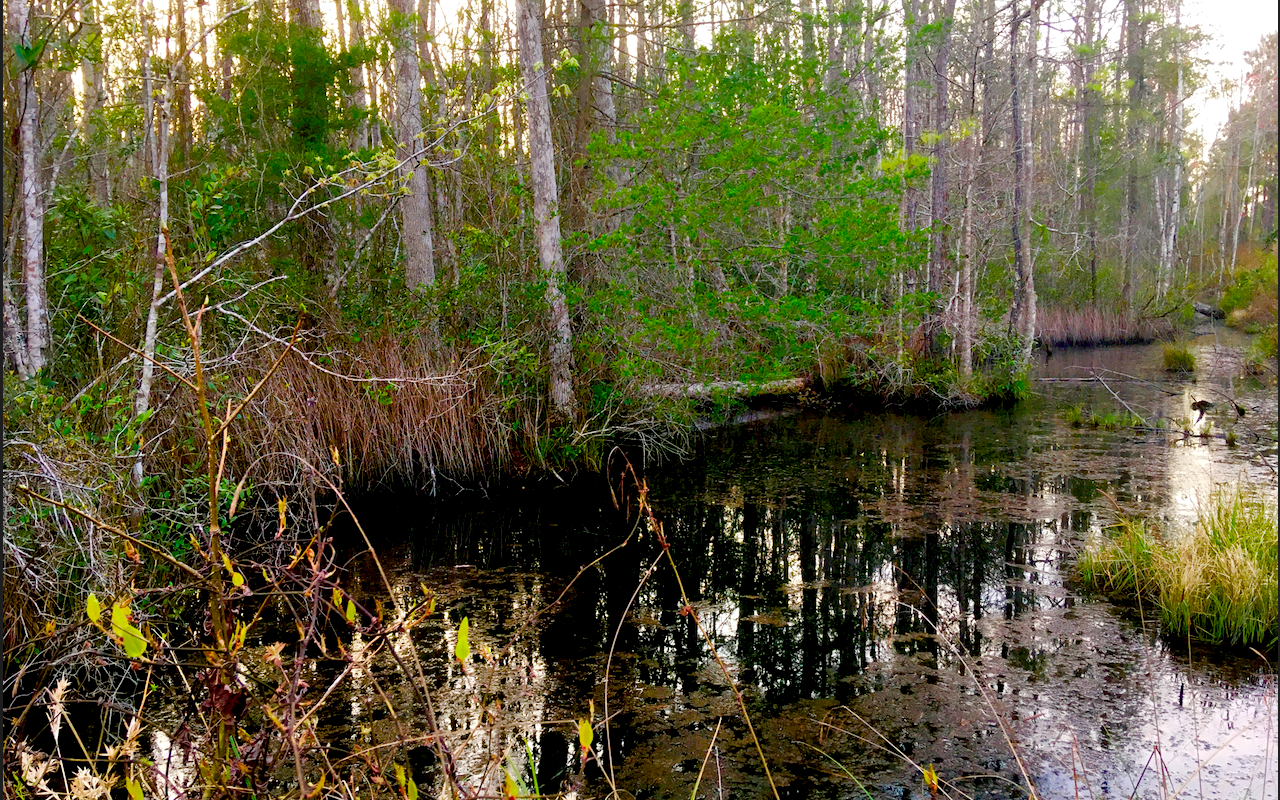
Sandy Ridge Gut
