= Henry River Mill Village, North Carolina =

Henry River Mill Village
- Village (ghost town)
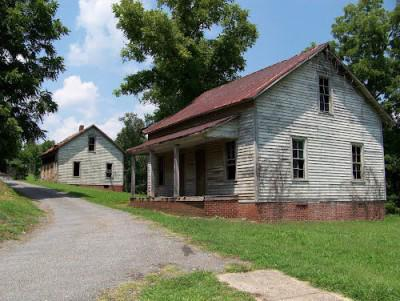

- Location in the state of North Carolina
- Coordinates: 35°41′45.6″N 81°25′44.4″W
- Country: United States
- State: North Carolina
- County: Burke
- Henry River Mill Village Historic District
- U.S. National Register of Historic Places
- U.S. Historic district
- NRHP reference No.: 100003929
- Added to NRHP: May 9, 2019

Henry River Mill Village is a small textile village in Burke County, North Carolina. It is an unaltered, but now-decaying example of an early industrial environment in Burke County. Today, the remaining buildings of the Henry River Mill Village are traces of the industrial heritage of the county.

Built as a planned community, the village was a self-contained complex with its own mill, dam, water and fire-protection systems, and company store. In later years, the village gained amenities such as walkways, terraced green spaces, and field stone retaining walls. Today, most of the village's original buildings remain sited along a small gorge of the Henry River, just west of Catawba County, North Carolina.

The site is private property but can be driven through via Henry River Road. It is located a short distance from Interstate 40 via an exit near Hildebran. The site was listed on the National Register of Historic Places in 2019.

== History ==
=== 20th century ===
In 1904 Michael Erastus Rudisill laid out the mill and village on a 1,500-acre (610 ha) tract, chosen for its hydro power potential. Rudisill, along with his brother Albert Pinkney Rudisill, built the village and engineered the dam and mill building along with David William Aderholdt, Miles R. Rudisill, and Marcus Lafayette Aderholdt.

The mill was incorporated as the Henry River Manufacturing Company. The company manufactured fine cotton yarns. Beginning in 1905, a 30-foot (9.1 m) reinforced concrete dam was constructed with a three-story brick mill building. In its early years, the mill operated 4,000 yarn-making spindles. By the time it shut down in the late 1960s, the mill had 12,000 spindles and produced fine combed yarn for lace.

The residential area of the village consisted of approximately 35 small worker's cottages. These 1 1/2-story duplex houses were laid out along the steep contours of the river's northern bank. The workers lived in boarding houses or workers' cottages built by the company, which were leased at nominal fees.

Around 1907 the four mill owners, the Rudisills and the Aderholdts, built new homes for themselves just outside the village. Although one burned in 1935, three of the four houses are still standing today.

Since the loss of the main mill building, the centerpiece of the village today is the two-story brick company store building. This building served as a mill office with the upper floor used as a school room and for church services from 1907 to 1917.

In 1912 a steel truss bridge engineered by the Rudisills was built across the Henry River. When built, it was reputed to be the highest bridge in the state. During the 1916 flood this bridge was one of the few not destroyed. In 1960 a new concrete bridge replaced the steel truss bridge.

The Henry River Mill originally ran on waterpower. In 1914 a steam plant was installed then in 1926, the mill was converted to electric power. The mill closed in 1971 and was purchased by Wade Shepherd in 1976. Shepherd owned other mills and intended to restore the mill when it burned in 1977; lightning was the suspected cause.

=== 21st century ===
The mill and village were put on the North Carolina Study List of the National Register of Historic Places. Late in 2002, through the Burke County Partners in Economic Development's Heritage Preservation Committee, efforts began to explore development of the historic site.

The 72-acre (29 ha) village was a filming location of "District 12" scenes of the 2012 film The Hunger Games. In the wake of the film's release, The SyFy Channel's show “Hollywood Treasure” estimated the value of the property at more than $1.2 million in 2012 and took bids (unsuccessfully) to sell it. A book about the town and its people was published in 2012.

In 2017, the abandoned property was purchased by local residents whose vision is to create a "Henry River Mill Village Business District" to highlight the history of the site.

The company store was damaged by a tornado late in 2017, but because the windows had been broken by vandals, thus dissipating air pressure, major damage to the building was averted. The new owner, Calvin Reyes, has plans to turn that building into a restaurant. Twenty of the thirty-five mill houses remained, and twelve more were to be added, to be occupied by tourists. Mill artifacts would be placed in a museum.

The town was featured in season 1 episode 4 of In With The Old (10–22–2021) where the Reyes family (the new owners of the village) were refurbishing one of the original mill houses.

== Gallery ==
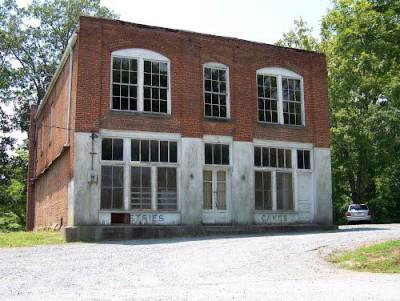
Henry River Mill Village Store, 2013

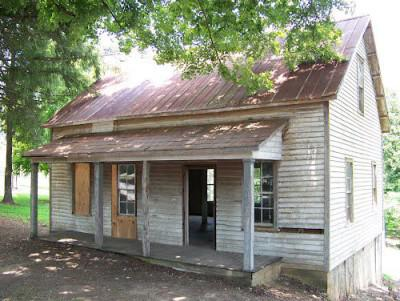
2013

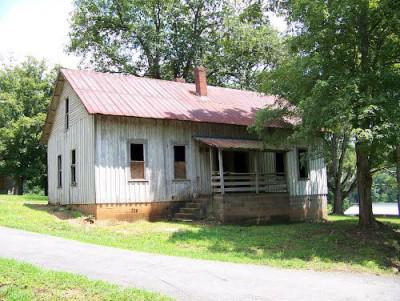
2013

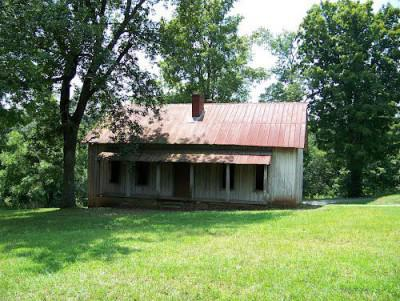
2013
