= List of ghost towns in North Carolina =

This is an incomplete list of ghost towns in North Carolina.

- Brunswick Town (former state capital)
- Buffalo City
- Cape Lookout Village
- Cataloochee
- Ceramic
- Diamond City
- Fort Dobbs (frontier fort during the French and Indian war)
- Glenville (town submerged by Lake Glenville, some residents relocated to the eastern edge of the lake)
- Henry River Mill Village
- Judson (submerged under Fontana Lake)
- Lost Cove
- Mortimer
- Portsmouth
- Proctor (isolated by Lake Fontana and abandoned)
- Roanoke Colony
- Ruby City (mining town once located near Willets in Jackson County, now the site of the Balsam Mountain Preserve)
- Spencer Mountain (textile town once located near Ranlo in Gaston County, abandoned when its textile mill was destroyed)
- Whitney (partially submerged by Badin Lake)
