= Dare County, North Carolina =

County in North Carolina, United States

- County
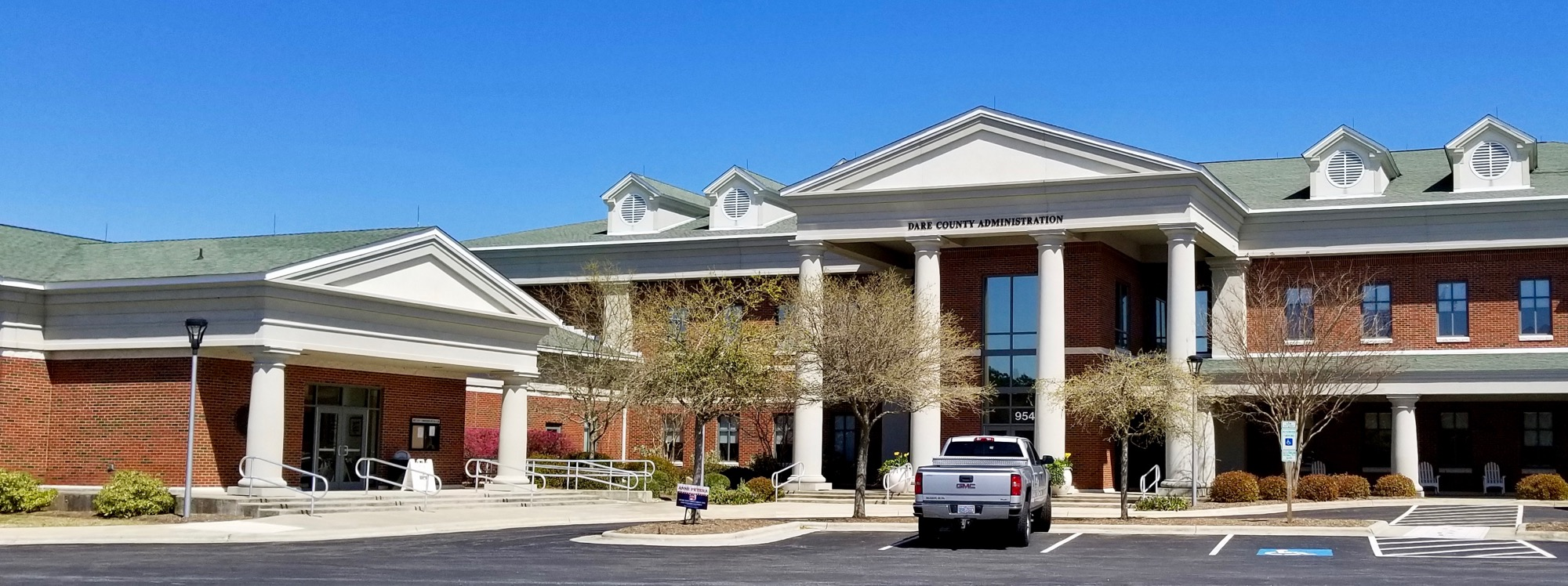
- Dare County Administration Building

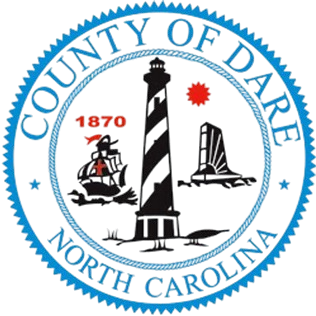
- Flag Seal
- Nickname: Land of Beginnings
- Motto(s): "Caring for our Community: A Nurturing Place Where We All Can Live and Grow."
- Location within the U.S. state of North Carolina
- Interactive map of Dare County, North Carolina
- Coordinates: 35.61°N 75.77°W
- Country: United States
- State: North Carolina
- Founded: 1870
- Named for: Virginia Dare
- Seat: Manteo
- Largest municipality: Kill Devil Hills

Area
  - Total: 1,541.74 sq mi (3,993.1 km^{2})
  - Land: 383.23 sq mi (992.6 km^{2})
  - Water: 1,158.51 sq mi (3,000.5 km^{2}) 75.14%

Population (2020)
  - Total: 36,915
  - Estimate (2025): 38,245 ▲
  - Density: 96.33/sq mi (37.19/km^{2})
- Time zone: UTC−5 (Eastern)
  - Summer (DST): UTC−4 (EDT)
- Congressional district: 3rd
- Website: www.darenc.gov

Dare County is the easternmost county in the U.S. state of North Carolina and the southernmost county in the Hampton Roads Combined Statistical Area (CSA). As of the 2020 census, the population was 36,915. Its county seat is Manteo.

Dare County is included in the Kill Devil Hills, NC Micropolitan Statistical Area, which is also included in the Virginia Beach-Chesapeake, VA-NC Combined Statistical Area.

Because it includes much of Pamlico Sound, Dare County is the largest county in North Carolina by total area, although if considering land area only, it drops down to 68th in size among the state's 100 counties.

== History ==
Dare County is named after Virginia Dare, the first child born in the Americas to English parents, who was born within the county's current borders. Founded in 1870 from parts of Tyrrell, Currituck and Hyde counties, it consists of a large segment of the Outer Banks of North Carolina, along with Roanoke Island and a peninsula of land attached to the mainland. Most of the county consists of a string of resort communities along the Outer Banks. While lightly populated by year-round residents, the population swells during the summer with vacationers.

At one time, the now-abandoned town of Buffalo City was the largest community in the county.

== Geography ==
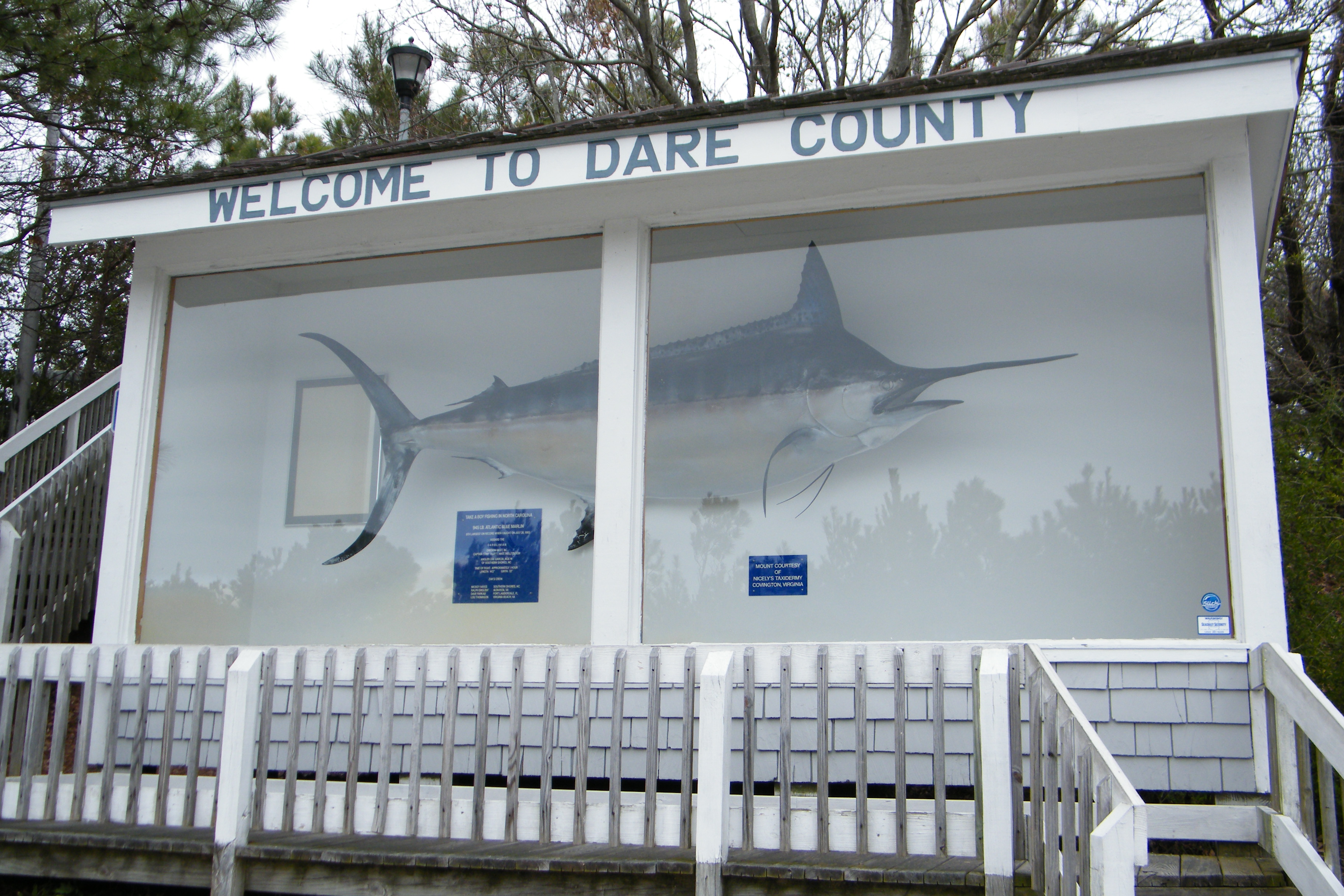
Dare County welcome center

According to the U.S. Census Bureau, the county has a total area of 1,541.74 square miles (3,993.1 km^{2}), of which 383.23 square miles (992.6 km^{2}) is land and 1,158.51 square miles (3,000.5 km^{2}) (75.14%) is water. It is the largest county in North Carolina by total area.

Dare County includes the middle part of the Outer Banks and contains Roanoke Island.

=== National protected areas ===
- Alligator River National Wildlife Refuge (part)
- Cape Hatteras National Seashore (part)
- Fort Raleigh National Historic Site
- Monitor National Marine Sanctuary
- Pea Island National Wildlife Refuge
- Wright Brothers National Memorial

=== State and local protected areas/sites ===
- Bodie Island Lighthouse
- Buxton Woods Coastal Reserve Dedicated Nature Preserve
- Buxton Woods Game Land
- Cape Hatteras Lighthouse
- Dare Game Land (part)
- Graveyard of the Atlantic Museum
- Hatteras Inlet Crab Spawning Sanctuary (part)
- Jennette's Pier
- Jockey's Ridge State Park
- Kitty Hawk Woods Coastal Reserve
- Kitty Hawk Woods Reserve
- Nags Head Woods Preserve Dedicated Nature Preserve
- North Carolina Aquarium on Roanoke Island
- Oregon Inlet Crab Spawning Sanctuary
- Pamlico Sound Mechanical Harvesting of Oysters Prohibited Area
- Roanoke Island Festival Park
- Roanoke Island Maritime Museum
- Roanoke Island Marshes Dedicated Nature Preserve
- Roanoke Island Marshes Game Land
- Run Hill State Natural Area
- Run Hill State Natural Area Dedicated Nature Preserve
- Sandy Run Park

=== Major water bodies ===
- Albemarle Sound
- Alligator River
- Atlantic Ocean (North Atlantic Ocean)
- Broad Creek
- Croatan Sound
- Currituck Sound
- East Lake
- Hatteras Bight
- Hatteras Inlet
- Intracoastal Waterway
- Long Shoal River
- Milltail Creek
- Oregon Inlet
- Pamlico Sound
- Raleigh Bay
- Roanoke Sound
- Sawyer Lake
- Shallowbag Bay
- South Lake

=== Adjacent counties ===
- Currituck County – north
- Hyde County – southwest
- Tyrrell County – west

=== Major highways ===
- US 64
- US 64 Byp.
- US 158
- US 264
- NC 12
- NC 345
- NC 400

=== Major infrastructure ===
- Dare County Bombing Range, within Alligator River National Wildlife Refuge
- Dare County Regional Airport, general aviation airport
- First Flight Airport, inside Wright Brothers National Memorial
- Hatteras–Ocracoke Ferry (to Hyde County)
- Stumpy Point–Rodanthe Ferry, emergency ferry service typically used for hurricane evacuations or when NC 12 is damaged after a storm

== Demographics ==
Historical population
Census	Pop.	Note	%±
1870	2,778		—
1880	3,243		16.7%
1890	3,768		16.2%
1900	4,757		26.2%
1910	4,841		1.8%
1920	5,115		5.7%
1930	5,202		1.7%
1940	6,401		23.0%
1950	5,405		−15.6%
1960	5,935		9.8%
1970	6,995		17.9%
1980	13,377		91.2%
1990	22,746		70.0%
2000	29,967		31.7%
2010	33,920		13.2%
2020	36,915		8.8%
2025 (est.)	38,245	▲	3.6%
U.S. Decennial Census; 1790–1960 1900–1990; 1990–2000 2010 2020

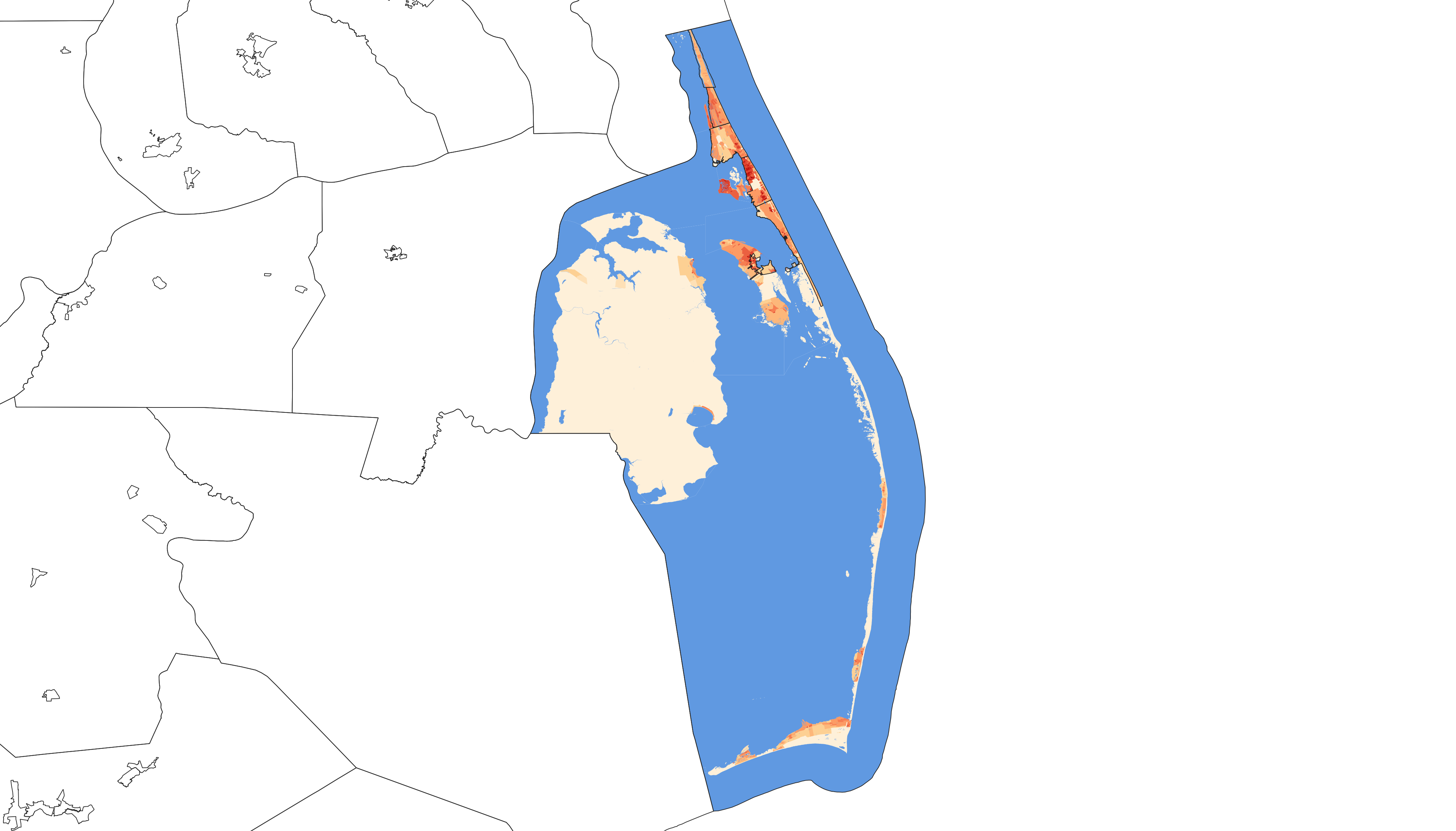
2020 population density of Dare County NC by census block

=== 2020 census ===
Dare County, North Carolina – Racial and ethnic composition Note: the US Census treats Hispanic/Latino as an ethnic category. This table excludes Latinos from the racial categories and assigns them to a separate category. Hispanics/Latinos may be of any race.
Race / Ethnicity (NH = Non-Hispanic)	Pop 1980	Pop 1990	Pop 2000	Pop 2010	Pop 2020	% 1980	% 1990	% 2000	% 2010	% 2020
White alone (NH)	12,428	21,626	28,028	30,061	31,921	92.91%	95.08%	93.53%	88.62%	86.47%
Black or African American alone (NH)	817	807	793	812	678	6.11%	3.55%	2.65%	2.39%	1.84%
Native American or Alaska Native alone (NH)	18	37	76	101	99	0.13%	0.16%	0.25%	0.30%	0.27%
Asian alone (NH)	40	76	110	211	260	0.30%	0.33%	0.37%	0.62%	0.70%
Native Hawaiian or Pacific Islander alone (NH)	x	x	11	10	10	x	x	0.04%	0.03%	0.03%
Other race alone (NH)	18	1	14	14	140	0.13%	0.00%	0.05%	0.04%	0.38%
Mixed race or Multiracial (NH)	x	x	269	501	1,253	x	x	0.90%	1.48%	3.39%
Hispanic or Latino (any race)	56	199	666	2,210	2,554	0.42%	0.87%	2.22%	6.52%	6.92%
Total	13,377	22,746	29,967	33,920	36,915	100.00%	100.00%	100.00%	100.00%	100.00%

As of the 2020 census, the county had a population of 36,915, 15,966 households, and 10,281 families residing in the county. The median age was 49.7 years; 17.5% of residents were under the age of 18 and 24.7% were 65 years of age or older. For every 100 females there were 97.2 males, and for every 100 females age 18 and over there were 95.3 males age 18 and over.

The racial makeup of the county was 87.8% White, 1.9% Black or African American, 0.5% American Indian and Alaska Native, 0.7% Asian, <0.1% Native Hawaiian and Pacific Islander, 3.2% from some other race, and 5.9% from two or more races. Hispanic or Latino residents of any race comprised 6.9% of the population.

77.9% of residents lived in urban areas, while 22.1% lived in rural areas.

There were 15,966 households in the county, of which 23.5% had children under the age of 18 living in them. Of all households, 51.6% were married-couple households, 17.2% were households with a male householder and no spouse or partner present, and 23.8% were households with a female householder and no spouse or partner present. About 27.0% of all households were made up of individuals and 13.1% had someone living alone who was 65 years of age or older.

There were 34,237 housing units, of which 53.4% were vacant. Among occupied housing units, 77.4% were owner-occupied and 22.6% were renter-occupied. The homeowner vacancy rate was 1.6% and the rental vacancy rate was 20.7%.

=== 2010 census ===
At the 2010 census, there were 33,920 people, 12,690 households, and 8,450 families residing in the county. The population density was 78 people per square mile (30 people/km^{2}). There were 26,671 housing units at an average density of 70 units per square mile (27 units/km^{2}). The racial makeup of the county was 92.3% White, 2.5% Black or African American, 0.4% Native American, 0.6% Asian, 0.0% Pacific Islander, 2.4% from other races, and 1.8% from two or more races. 6.5% of the population were Hispanic or Latino of any race.

There were 12,690 households, out of which 27.3% had children under the age of 18 living with them, 55.0% were married couples living together, 8.1% had a female householder with no husband present, and 33.4% were non-families. 25.0% of all households were made up of individuals, and 7.9% had someone living alone who was 65 years of age or older. The average household size was 2.34 and the average family size was 2.79.

In the county, the population was spread out, with 21.4% under the age of 18, 6.3% from 18 to 24, 30.8% from 25 to 44, 27.7% from 45 to 64, and 13.8% who were 65 years of age or older. The median age was 40 years. For every 100 females there were 101.5 males. For every 100 females age 18 and over, there were 100.2 males.

The median income for a household in the county was $42,411, and the median income for a family was $49,302. Males had a median income of $31,240 versus $24,318 for females. The per capita income for the county was $23,614. About 5.5% of families and 8.0% of the population were below the poverty line, including 9.9% of those under age 18 and 5.3% of those age 65 or over.

=== Ancestry ===
As of 2010, the largest self-reported ancestry groups in Dare County were:

Ancestry	Percent (2010)
English (England)	22.0%
German (Germany)	18.4%
Irish (Republic of Ireland)	15.3%
American (United States)	8.7%
Italian (Italy)	6.2%
Scottish (Scotland)	4.8%
Scotch-Irish (Ulster)	4.0%
Polish (Poland)	3.0%
Dutch (Netherlands)	1.8%
Welsh (Wales)	1.2%

== Government and politics ==
Dare County is presently a Republican county, having voted Republican since the 1980 election, though the Republican margins of victory are significantly smaller than most Southern largely-white counties. No Democratic presidential nominee has carried Dare County since Jimmy Carter did so in 1976. Before the 1950s, it was mostly a typical "Solid South" Democratic county, that did not vote Republican between 1900 and 1952, albeit by significantly smaller margins than much of the rest of the Solid South. Dare County is governed by the Dare County Board of Commissioners. Dare County is a part of the Albemarle Commission regional council of governments.

United States presidential election results for Dare County, North Carolina
Year	Republican		Democratic		Third party(ies)	
Year	No.	%	No.	%	No.	%
1880	274	48.75%	288	51.25%	0	0.00%
1884	291	53.30%	255	46.70%	0	0.00%
1888	337	51.22%	321	48.78%	0	0.00%
1892	356	51.52%	335	48.48%	0	0.00%
1896	471	53.58%	408	46.42%	0	0.00%
1900	331	45.03%	404	54.97%	0	0.00%
1904	350	45.75%	415	54.25%	0	0.00%
1908	370	47.07%	416	52.93%	0	0.00%
1912	238	33.29%	397	55.52%	80	11.19%
1916	363	43.58%	470	56.42%	0	0.00%
1920	632	43.38%	825	56.62%	0	0.00%
1924	629	43.17%	826	56.69%	2	0.14%
1928	814	47.97%	883	52.03%	0	0.00%
1932	497	28.50%	1,241	71.16%	6	0.34%
1936	542	28.07%	1,389	71.93%	0	0.00%
1940	315	20.60%	1,214	79.40%	0	0.00%
1944	259	21.14%	966	78.86%	0	0.00%
1948	373	30.72%	802	66.06%	39	3.21%
1952	767	44.44%	959	55.56%	0	0.00%
1956	1,028	55.06%	839	44.94%	0	0.00%
1960	1,058	45.90%	1,247	54.10%	0	0.00%
1964	867	37.00%	1,476	63.00%	0	0.00%
1968	1,035	40.13%	700	27.14%	844	32.73%
1972	1,986	75.20%	634	24.01%	21	0.80%
1976	1,680	43.18%	2,191	56.31%	20	0.51%
1980	2,794	49.76%	2,497	44.47%	324	5.77%
1984	4,738	71.83%	1,839	27.88%	19	0.29%
1988	5,234	64.85%	2,806	34.77%	31	0.38%
1992	4,357	40.73%	3,925	36.70%	2,414	22.57%
1996	4,977	46.00%	4,522	41.79%	1,321	12.21%
2000	7,301	56.15%	5,589	42.99%	112	0.86%
2004	9,345	60.10%	6,136	39.46%	67	0.43%
2008	9,745	53.99%	8,074	44.74%	229	1.27%
2012	10,248	57.02%	7,393	41.13%	333	1.85%
2016	11,460	58.44%	7,222	36.83%	927	4.73%
2020	13,938	57.52%	9,936	41.00%	358	1.48%
2024	14,792	58.71%	10,074	39.98%	330	1.31%

== Education ==
Public education is run by Dare County Schools. There are three public high schools/secondary schools with high school components:

- Cape Hatteras Secondary School
- First Flight High School
- Manteo High School

College of The Albemarle is the local community college, with a Dare campus in Manteo.

Dare County Library has branches in Manteo, Kill Devil Hills, and Hatteras.

== Lighthouses ==
Dare County is home to two popular lighthouses: The Cape Hatteras Lighthouse and the Bodie Island Lighthouse. There is also a beacon atop the Wright Brothers Memorial. A third lighthouse was built by the Town of Manteo and dedicated on September 25, 2004. The Roanoke Marshes Lighthouse is an exterior recreation of the 1877 screwpile lighthouse of the same name and is located on the Manteo waterfront. It serves as exhibit space for the N.C. Maritime Museum on Roanoke Island.

== Communities ==
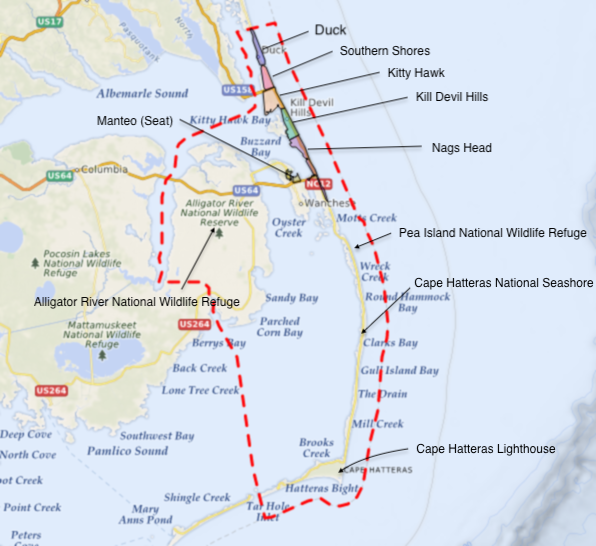
Clickable map of Dare County

=== Towns ===
- Duck
- Kill Devil Hills (largest municipality)
- Kitty Hawk
- Manteo (county seat)
- Nags Head
- Southern Shores

=== Census-designated places ===
- Avon
- Buxton
- Frisco
- Hatteras
- Manns Harbor
- Rodanthe
- Salvo
- Wanchese
- Waves

=== Unincorporated communities ===
- Colington Island
- East Lake
- Little Kinnakeet
- Martins Point
- Stumpy Point

=== Townships ===
- Atlantic
- Croatan
- East Lake
- Hatteras
- Kinnekeet
- Nags Head

=== Ghost towns ===
- Buffalo City (est: 1870s) (abandoned: 1950s), highest population: 3,000 (early 20th century)

== See also ==
- List of counties in North Carolina
- National Register of Historic Places listings in Dare County, North Carolina
- List of ghost towns in North Carolina
- Roanoke Colony, first attempted permanent English settlement in the Americas
- Hurricane Isabel, worst hurricane to hit Dare County to-date; caused widespread damage in the county
