= 1908 United States presidential election in North Carolina =

- November 3, 1908
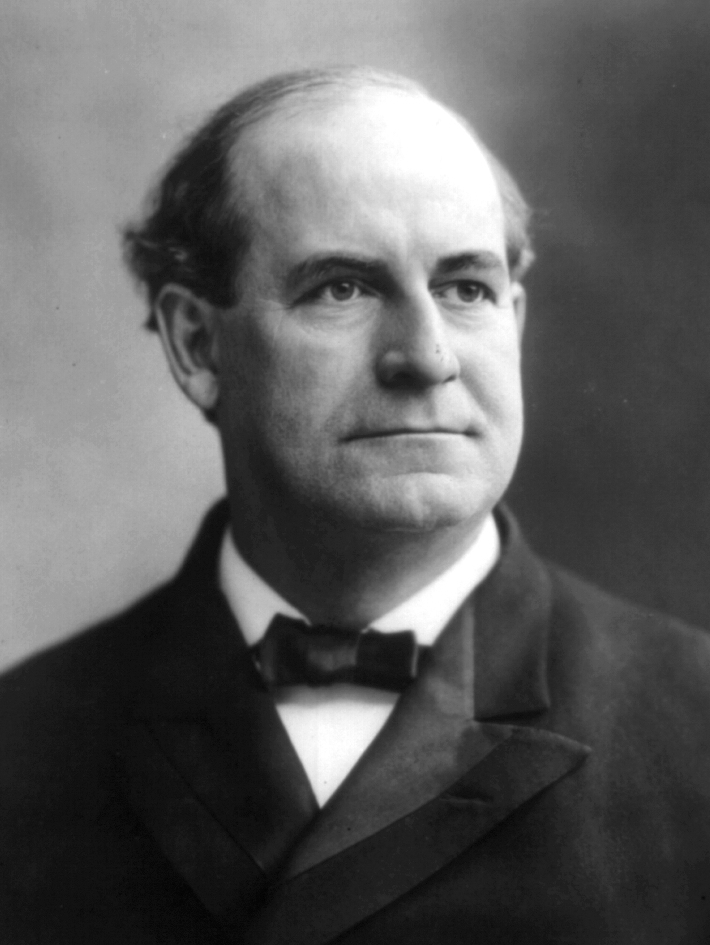

Nominee	William Jennings Bryan	William Howard Taft
Party	Democratic	Republican
Home state	Nebraska	Ohio
Running mate	John W. Kern	James S. Sherman
Electoral vote	12	0
Popular vote	136,928	114,887
Percentage	54.22%	45.49%
County results
Bryan
50–60%
60–70%
70–80%
80–90%
90–100%
Taft
50–60%
60–70%
70–80%
President before election
Theodore Roosevelt
Republican
Elected President
William Howard Taft
Republican

The 1908 United States presidential election in North Carolina took place on November 3, 1908. All contemporary 46 states were part of the 1908 United States presidential election. North Carolina voters chose 12 electors to the Electoral College, which selected the president and vice president.

North Carolina was won by the Democratic nominees, former Representative William Jennings Bryan of Nebraska and his running mate John W. Kern of Indiana. They defeated the Republican Party nominees, William Howard Taft and his running mate James S. Sherman of New York. Bryan won the state by a margin of 8.73%.

Although, like all former Confederate states, North Carolina would during its “Redemption” develop a politics based upon Jim Crow laws, disfranchisement of its African-American population and dominance of the Democratic Party, the Republican Party possessed sufficient historic Unionist white support from the mountains and northwestern Piedmont to gain a stable one-third of the statewide vote total in general elections even after blacks lost the right to vote. After the failure of Theodore Roosevelt to reconcile with the South, new nominee Taft would in October become the first Republican candidate to tour the South. Aided by opposition by developing manufacturers to Bryan's populism, and by his willingness to accept black disfranchisement alongside a completely “lily-white” state GOP that even excluded blacks from membership, Taft gained substantially upon Theodore Roosevelt's performance in 1904, especially in previously Democratic western and Piedmont counties. He was the first Republican to ever carry Cabarrus County and Catawba County – which would become solidly Republican after World War I and among thirteen Tar Heel counties to back Barry Goldwater over Lyndon Johnson – and also Jackson County.

Bryan had previously won North Carolina against William McKinley in both 1896 and 1900.

== Results ==
1908 United States presidential election in North Carolina
Party	Candidate	Votes	Percentage	Electoral votes
Democratic	William Jennings Bryan	136,928	54.22%	12
Republican	William Howard Taft	114,887	45.49%	0
Socialist	Eugene V. Debs	372	0.15%	0
Prohibition	Eugene W. Chafin	354	0.14%	0
Write-ins	Scattered	13	0.01%	0
Totals		252,554	100.00%	12
Voter turnout				—

=== Results by county ===
1908 United States presidential election in North Carolina by county
County	William Jennings Bryan Democratic		William Howard Taft Republican		Eugene Victor Debs Social Democratic		Eugene Wilder Chafin Prohibition		Margin	
County	%	#	%	#	%	#	%	#	%	#
Currituck	91.16%	701	8.84%	68	0.00%	0	0.00%	0	82.31%	633
Northampton	90.27%	1,726	9.73%	186	0.00%	0	0.00%	0	80.54%	1,540
Scotland	89.36%	714	10.64%	85	0.00%	0	0.00%	0	78.72%	629
Halifax	85.07%	2,165	14.93%	380	0.00%	0	0.00%	0	70.14%	1,785
Anson	83.19%	1,490	16.81%	301	0.00%	0	0.00%	0	66.39%	1,189
Edgecombe	80.01%	1,753	19.99%	438	0.00%	0	0.00%	0	60.02%	1,315
New Hanover (Note: In this county there was one vote for a write-in candidate.)	78.39%	1,857	21.57%	511	0.00%	0	0.00%	0	56.82%	1,346
Warren	78.27%	1,066	21.73%	296	0.00%	0	0.00%	0	56.53%	770
Franklin	77.96%	1,984	22.04%	561	0.00%	0	0.00%	0	55.91%	1,423
Bertie	77.75%	1,258	22.25%	360	0.00%	0	0.00%	0	55.50%	898
Martin	76.07%	1,338	23.93%	421	0.00%	0	0.00%	0	52.13%	917
Craven	75.70%	1,399	24.30%	449	0.00%	0	0.00%	0	51.41%	950
Hyde	74.80%	662	25.20%	223	0.00%	0	0.00%	0	49.60%	439
Chowan	74.46%	621	25.54%	213	0.00%	0	0.00%	0	48.92%	408
Pitt	73.04%	2,419	26.87%	890	0.00%	0	0.09%	3	46.17%	1,529
Pender	71.37%	930	28.63%	373	0.00%	0	0.00%	0	42.75%	557
Union	70.87%	2,029	29.13%	834	0.00%	0	0.00%	0	41.74%	1,195
Camden	70.82%	398	29.18%	164	0.00%	0	0.00%	0	41.64%	234
Hertford	70.39%	839	29.61%	353	0.00%	0	0.00%	0	40.77%	486
Mecklenburg	70.09%	3,926	29.37%	1,645	0.07%	4	0.46%	26	40.72%	2,281
Pasquotank (Note: In this county there were two votes for write-in candidates)	69.54%	929	30.31%	405	0.00%	0	0.00%	0	39.22%	524
Richmond	69.01%	1,029	30.99%	462	0.00%	0	0.00%	0	38.03%	567
Caswell	68.62%	820	31.21%	373	0.00%	0	0.17%	2	37.41%	447
Granville	67.99%	1,561	31.97%	734	0.00%	0	0.04%	1	36.02%	827
Robeson	67.48%	2,698	32.52%	1,300	0.00%	0	0.00%	0	34.97%	1,398
Gates	65.96%	653	34.04%	337	0.00%	0	0.00%	0	31.92%	316
Jones	65.00%	585	35.00%	315	0.00%	0	0.00%	0	30.00%	270
Vance	63.62%	1,121	36.38%	641	0.00%	0	0.00%	0	27.24%	480
Bladen	63.17%	1,132	36.83%	660	0.00%	0	0.00%	0	26.34%	472
Wilson	63.07%	1,732	36.93%	1,014	0.00%	0	0.00%	0	26.15%	718
Greene	61.95%	876	38.05%	538	0.00%	0	0.00%	0	23.90%	338
Cleveland	60.98%	2,282	38.99%	1,459	0.03%	1	0.00%	0	21.99%	823
Haywood	59.91%	1,952	40.02%	1,304	0.06%	2	0.00%	0	19.89%	648
Lee	59.68%	832	40.32%	562	0.00%	0	0.00%	0	19.37%	270
Wayne	59.30%	2,207	40.41%	1,504	0.00%	0	0.30%	11	18.89%	703
Lenoir	58.98%	1,393	40.90%	966	0.13%	3	0.00%	0	18.08%	427
Harnett	58.79%	1,501	41.01%	1,047	0.04%	1	0.16%	4	17.78%	454
Beaufort	57.79%	1,828	41.23%	1,304	0.92%	29	0.06%	2	16.57%	524
Iredell	57.67%	2,465	42.19%	1,803	0.02%	1	0.12%	5	15.49%	662
Columbus	57.19%	1,845	42.81%	1,381	0.00%	0	0.00%	0	14.38%	464
Guilford	56.56%	3,822	42.36%	2,863	0.46%	31	0.62%	42	14.19%	959
Cumberland	55.77%	1,832	44.23%	1,453	0.00%	0	0.00%	0	11.54%	379
Nash	55.71%	1,678	44.29%	1,334	0.00%	0	0.00%	0	11.42%	344
Wake	55.55%	3,713	44.30%	2,961	0.00%	0	0.15%	10	11.25%	752
Pamlico	54.37%	628	43.38%	501	2.25%	26	0.00%	0	11.00%	127
Duplin	55.18%	1,508	44.82%	1,225	0.00%	0	0.00%	0	10.35%	283
Onslow	55.06%	870	44.94%	710	0.00%	0	0.00%	0	10.13%	160
Gaston	54.40%	2,398	44.69%	1,970	0.18%	8	0.73%	32	9.71%	428
Rowan	53.61%	2,392	45.02%	2,009	0.78%	35	0.58%	26	8.58%	383
Perquimans	53.08%	568	46.92%	502	0.00%	0	0.00%	0	6.17%	66
Dare	52.93%	416	47.07%	370	0.00%	0	0.00%	0	5.85%	46
Rutherford	52.79%	1,978	47.13%	1,766	0.00%	0	0.08%	3	5.66%	212
Alleghany	52.40%	633	47.60%	575	0.00%	0	0.00%	0	4.80%	58
Carteret	52.08%	1,152	47.92%	1,060	0.00%	0	0.00%	0	4.16%	92
Clay	51.58%	343	48.27%	321	0.15%	1	0.00%	0	3.31%	22
Yancey	50.73%	978	49.27%	950	0.00%	0	0.00%	0	1.45%	28
Moore	50.29%	1,109	48.84%	1,077	0.54%	12	0.32%	7	1.45%	32
Durham	50.41%	1,859	49.35%	1,820	0.08%	3	0.16%	6	1.06%	39
Chatham	50.36%	1,521	49.57%	1,497	0.00%	0	0.07%	2	0.79%	24
Lincoln	50.10%	1,222	49.90%	1,217	0.00%	0	0.00%	0	0.21%	5
Buncombe	49.10%	3,506	50.03%	3,572	0.76%	54	0.11%	8	-0.92%	-66
Ashe	49.47%	1,639	50.53%	1,674	0.00%	0	0.00%	0	-1.06%	-35
Alamance	48.79%	2,113	50.43%	2,184	0.07%	3	0.72%	31	-1.64%	-71
Burke	49.10%	1,310	50.90%	1,358	0.00%	0	0.00%	0	-1.80%	-48
McDowell	48.62%	950	51.18%	1,000	0.00%	0	0.20%	4	-2.56%	-50
Orange	48.61%	1,017	51.29%	1,073	0.10%	2	0.00%	0	-2.68%	-56
Jackson	48.44%	1,022	51.47%	1,086	0.09%	2	0.00%	0	-3.03%	-64
Rockingham	48.19%	1,887	51.28%	2,008	0.36%	14	0.18%	7	-3.09%	-121
Transylvania	48.26%	570	51.74%	611	0.00%	0	0.00%	0	-3.47%	-41
Catawba (Note: In this county there were ten votes for various write-in candidates.)	47.56%	1,864	51.29%	2,010	0.00%	0	0.89%	35	-3.73%	-146
Montgomery	48.07%	1,008	51.84%	1,087	0.00%	0	0.10%	2	-3.77%	-79
Randolph	48.02%	2,472	51.98%	2,676	0.00%	0	0.00%	0	-3.96%	-204
Johnston	47.84%	2,593	52.16%	2,827	0.00%	0	0.00%	0	-4.32%	-234
Davidson	47.35%	2,126	52.12%	2,340	0.09%	4	0.45%	20	-4.77%	-214
Graham	47.34%	418	52.66%	465	0.00%	0	0.00%	0	-5.32%	-47
Washington	47.10%	495	52.90%	556	0.00%	0	0.00%	0	-5.80%	-61
Macon	47.01%	927	52.99%	1,045	0.00%	0	0.00%	0	-5.98%	-118
Stanly	46.95%	1,491	53.05%	1,685	0.00%	0	0.00%	0	-6.11%	-194
Cabarrus	46.93%	1,610	53.07%	1,821	0.00%	0	0.00%	0	-6.15%	-211
Forsyth	44.94%	2,472	52.28%	2,876	2.38%	131	0.40%	22	-7.34%	-404
Polk	45.14%	511	54.86%	621	0.00%	0	0.00%	0	-9.72%	-110
Caldwell	44.72%	1,413	55.22%	1,745	0.00%	0	0.06%	2	-10.51%	-332
Tyrrell	44.13%	312	55.87%	395	0.00%	0	0.00%	0	-11.74%	-83
Person	43.63%	750	56.37%	969	0.00%	0	0.00%	0	-12.74%	-219
Alexander	42.47%	793	57.53%	1,074	0.00%	0	0.00%	0	-15.05%	-281
Watauga	42.29%	962	57.71%	1,313	0.00%	0	0.00%	0	-15.43%	-351
Brunswick	41.92%	607	58.08%	841	0.00%	0	0.00%	0	-16.16%	-234
Davie	39.61%	780	60.18%	1,185	0.00%	0	0.20%	4	-20.57%	-405
Swain	39.27%	602	60.73%	931	0.00%	0	0.00%	0	-21.46%	-329
Stokes	38.21%	1,061	61.61%	1,711	0.18%	5	0.00%	0	-23.41%	-650
Cherokee	37.38%	782	62.62%	1,310	0.00%	0	0.00%	0	-25.24%	-528
Surry	37.27%	1,709	62.60%	2,870	0.00%	0	0.13%	6	-25.32%	-1,161
Henderson	36.40%	917	63.60%	1,602	0.00%	0	0.00%	0	-27.19%	-685
Sampson	35.09%	1,335	64.78%	2,465	0.00%	0	0.13%	5	-29.70%	-1,130
Wilkes	31.50%	1,559	68.34%	3,382	0.00%	0	0.16%	8	-36.84%	-1,823
Madison	29.84%	862	70.16%	2,027	0.00%	0	0.00%	0	-40.33%	-1,165
Yadkin	26.43%	597	72.78%	1,644	0.00%	0	0.80%	18	-46.35%	-1,047
Mitchell	23.32%	550	76.68%	1,808	0.00%	0	0.00%	0	-53.35%	-1,258

== See also ==
- United States presidential elections in North Carolina
