= Buffalo City, North Carolina =

Town in North Carolina, US

Coordinates: 35°50′33″N 75°55′02″W

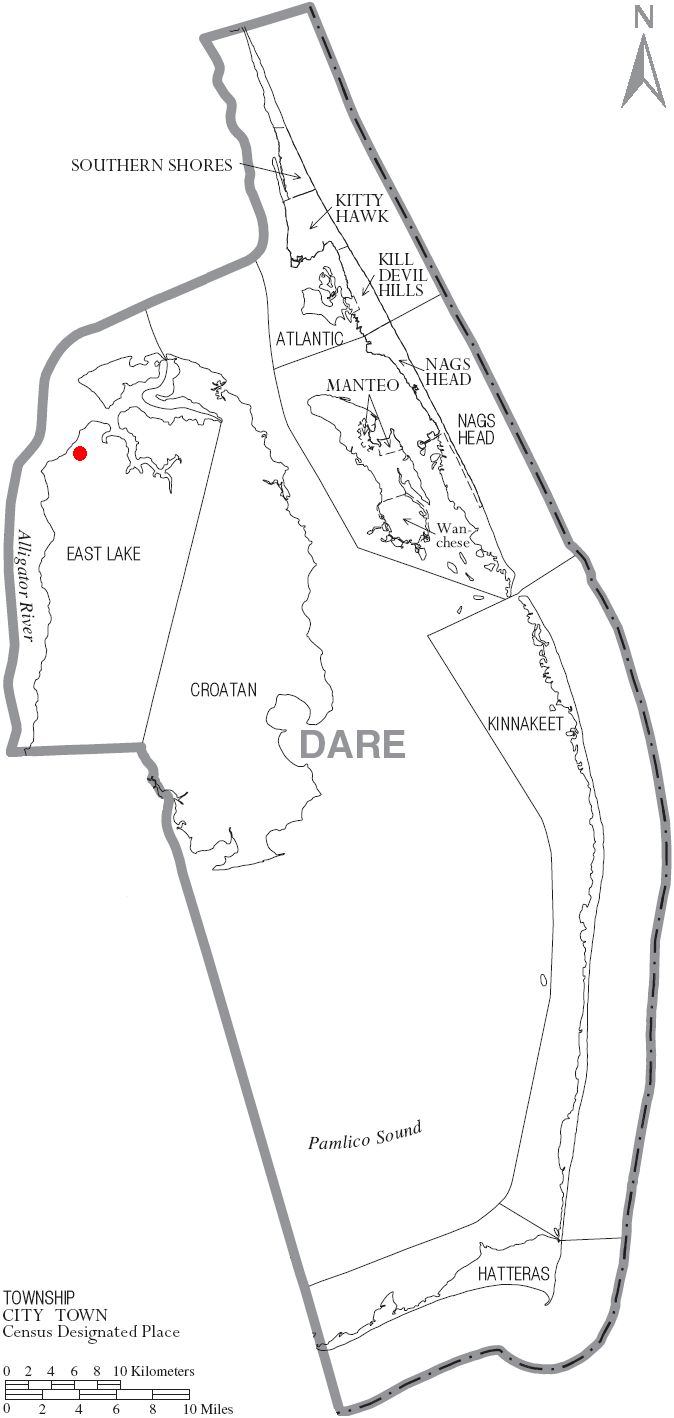
Location of Buffalo City on a map of Dare County, North Carolina

Buffalo City was a logging and moonshine town in East Lake Township, Dare County, North Carolina, United States. It was on the mainland, 19 miles (31 km) west of Manteo near present-day Manns Harbor. The marshy land where Buffalo City once stood, near U.S. 64, is now part of the Alligator River National Wildlife Refuge. The town's history lasted approximately 80 years from the 1870s to 1950s, but at one time Buffalo City's population of 3,000 in the early 20th century made it the largest community in Dare County. A hotel, post office, schoolhouse, general store, 100 miles (160 km) of railroad track and rows of homes once stood on the now-abandoned area. Today, the only remnants of the ghost town include a road sign, rusted rails and building debris now overgrown with weeds.

== History ==
=== Founding and logging industry ===
Loggers and train in Buffalo City

Founded shortly after the Civil War by the Buffalo Timber Company, Buffalo City was constructed on the north side of Milltail Creek by African-American laborers and more than 200 Russian immigrants. Many of these immigrants stayed and worked at the new logging town and composed half of the town’s population. The area surrounding Milltail Creek was harvested for juniper, cypress, and pine trees and became the largest logging operation in Northeastern North Carolina. Lumbers were paid 50 cents each day, although money was in the form of company-made aluminum pieces that were only good in Buffalo City. All purchases at the general store were made with this money. Given the locale's status as a company town, Buffalo City was never formally incorporated and had no formal law enforcement. Such authority as there was came from the timber company officials in their roles as officers in the corporation owning the private property upon which the town stood.

Sawmill in Buffalo City, North Carolina, c. 1909

On October 11, 1889, the first post office was opened in Buffalo City. According to National Archive records, Charles A. Whallou delivered the mail to citizens of the town. Over the next decade, the forests surrounding Buffalo City were heavily depleted. The Buffalo Timber Company closed their operations and the post office was shut down in 1903. In 1907, the Dare Company purchased the forest and resumed logging operations. The post office was reopened on February 29, 1908. The town’s name was changed to Daresville, although the post office and citizens still used the Buffalo City title. The town's logging industry prospered throughout the 1910s and early 1920s. There were approximately 100 miles (160 km) of railroad tracks built throughout the logging area. Mules carried felled trees from lumber camps to the nearest railroad track. Freight cars then carried the wood to a transfer station at Milltail Creek and the barges took the lumber to sawmills in Elizabeth City.

=== Moonshine industry and town’s decline ===
In 1920, Prohibition laws were passed in the United States and moonshine became a popular way for Buffalo City citizens to make extra money. When logging camps at Buffalo City began to close in the 1920s, moonshine became the primary revenue source for citizens. Almost every family in Buffalo City operated a still. Speakeasies throughout the eastern United States sold moonshine made in Buffalo City. The liquor was made deep in the woods and transported by the same methods as logging: by mules and boats. A 30-foot (9.1 m) boat named the Hattie Creef sailed down Milltail Creek and across the Albemarle Sound to Elizabeth City, where the liquor was sold. The boat returned with large amounts of sugar, an ingredient in making moonshine. Federal prohibition enforcers, called "revenuers", began to crack down on Buffalo City’s moonshine industry. Several men in the town were sentenced to jail.

When prohibition ended in 1933, Buffalo City’s economy was severely affected. With the loss of moonshine revenue, citizens began focusing on the logging industry once again. Most good timber had already been felled, but the sawmill continued to operate for the next two decades. Outbreaks of cholera, typhoid, smallpox and the flu swept throughout the community in the 1940s. The combination of these diseases and lack of work resulted in Buffalo City’s population declining to 100 people. The sawmill closed in the early 1950s and the town was abandoned.

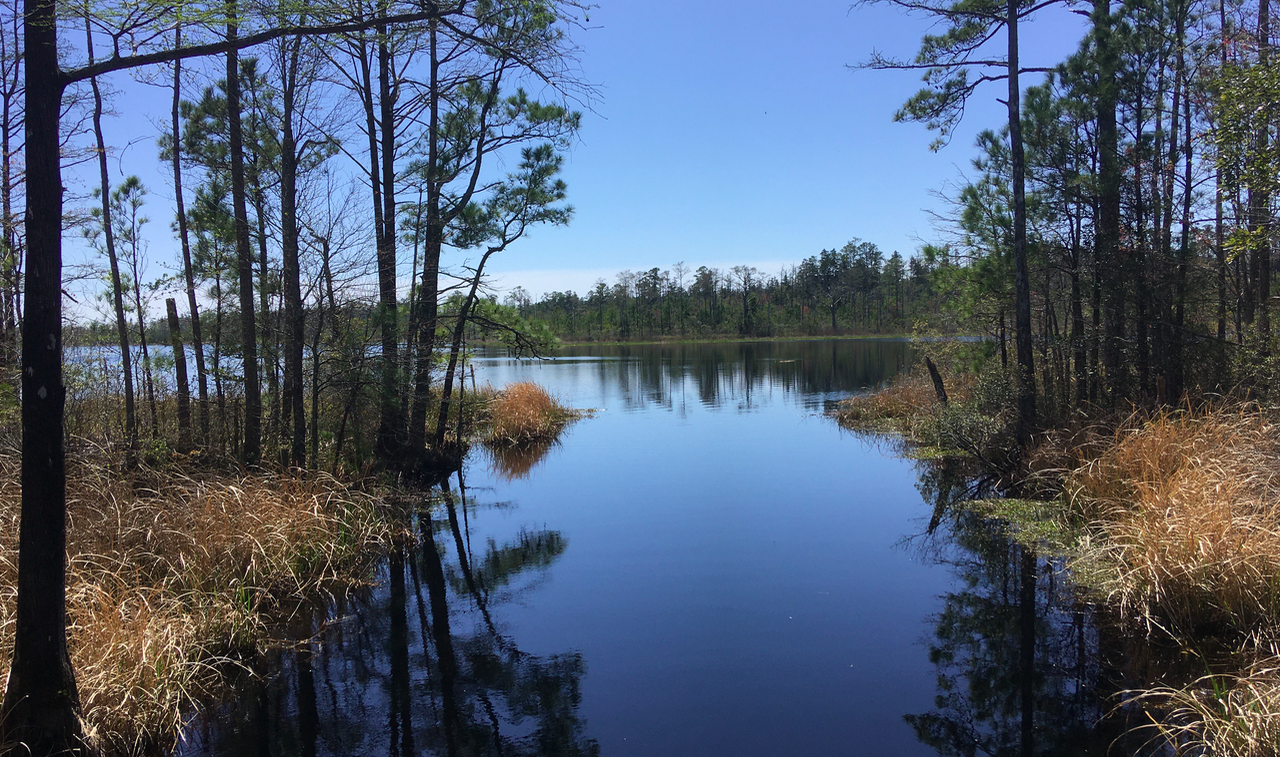
Site of Buffalo City today

The Richmond Cedar Works company bought the surrounding land, but eventually sold it to Prulean Farms, a subsidiary of Prudential Financial. During the 1970s, Prulean Farms ran an agricultural operation on the land surrounding the abandoned town. In 1984, the United States Fish and Wildlife Service acquired the land and formed the Alligator River National Wildlife Refuge, a haven for black bears and the endangered red wolf.

== Town layout ==
Buffalo City centered around its main street, Buffalo City Road, a 10-foot (3 m) dirt road that stretched from East Lake to Milltail Creek. Three roads, approximately 150 ft (46 m) in length, ran perpendicular to the main street and a fourth curved around the north side of the town. Because of the soft ground on which the town was constructed, the streets were covered with sheets of wood and sawdust to prevent citizens' sinking into the mud. The buildings were constructed of wood that could not be sold by the lumber company. Homes were painted either red or white. Red homes were occupied by white workers and homes painted white were used for blacks and immigrants. A railroad track was constructed on Buffalo City Road that brought the lumber from logging camps deep in the forest. Buffalo City did not have a police station or elected officials, and so a stockade was built in the center of town.

== See also ==
- History of North Carolina
- List of ghost towns in the United States
