= Navy Dare =

Dare County Bombing Range
- Dare County, North Carolina

Site information
- Type: Military installation
- Controlled by: United States Air Force and tenant command is the United States Navy

Site history
- Built: 1965
- In use: Active

Garrison information
- Current commander: US Air Force 4FW 4OSS/CC Seymour Johnson AFB

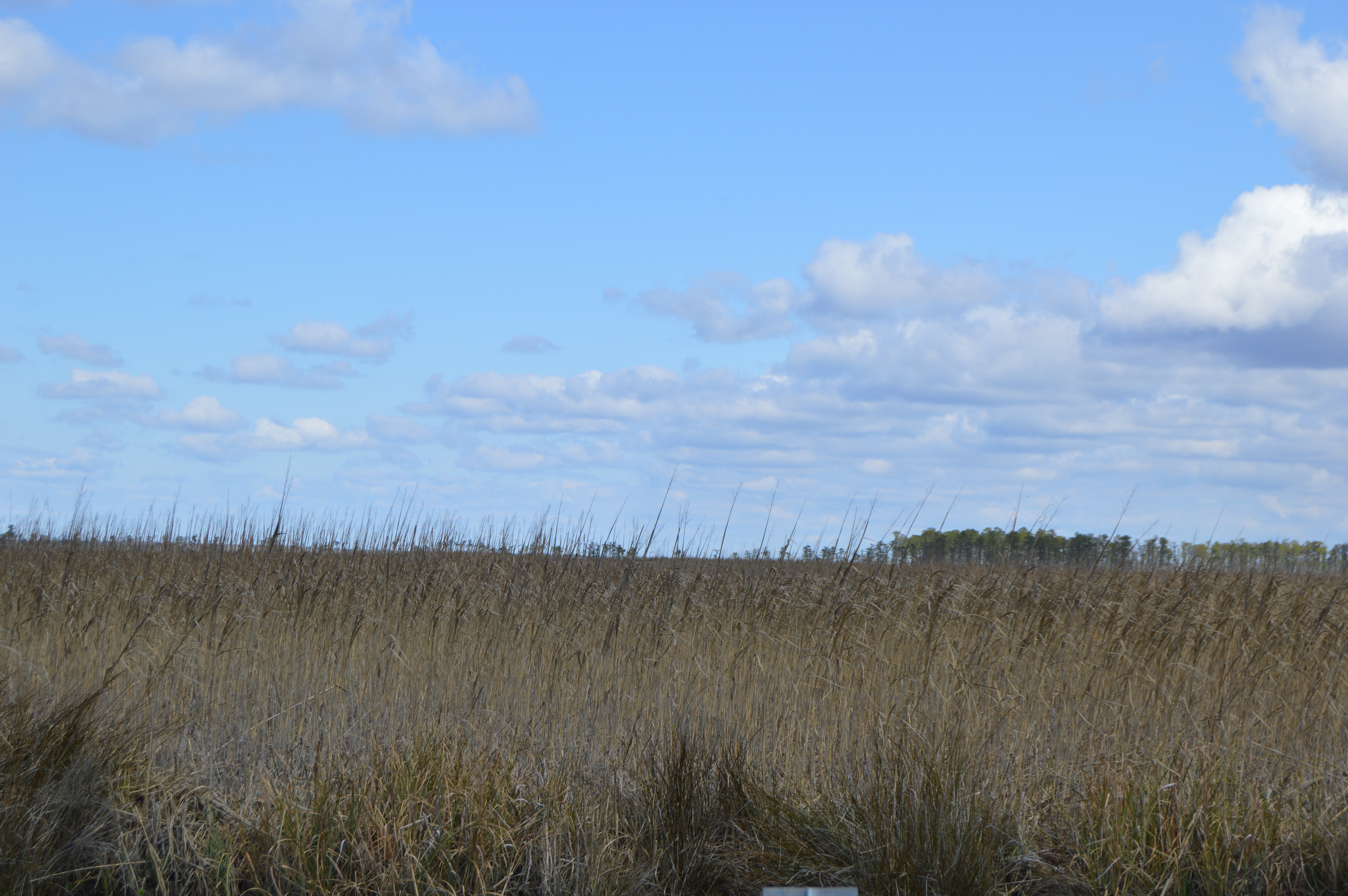
Marshland on the southern edge

The Dare County Bombing Range is a US Air Force managed and operated facility and is located in Dare County, North Carolina. The range serves as an air to surface bombing range for the US Air Force and US Navy who is a tenant command on the northern portion of the range The range is also used for some select special operations and Joint Terminal Attack Control (JTAC) training due to its remote location and harsh landscapes. The traffic is mostly light jet aircraft dropping 25 lb to 2000 lb dummy bombs. The most common sights at the range are the F-15E Strike Eagle, F/A-18 Hornet, Sikorsky UH-60 Black Hawk, and the T-34 Mentor.
