= 1900 United States presidential election in North Carolina =

- November 6, 1900

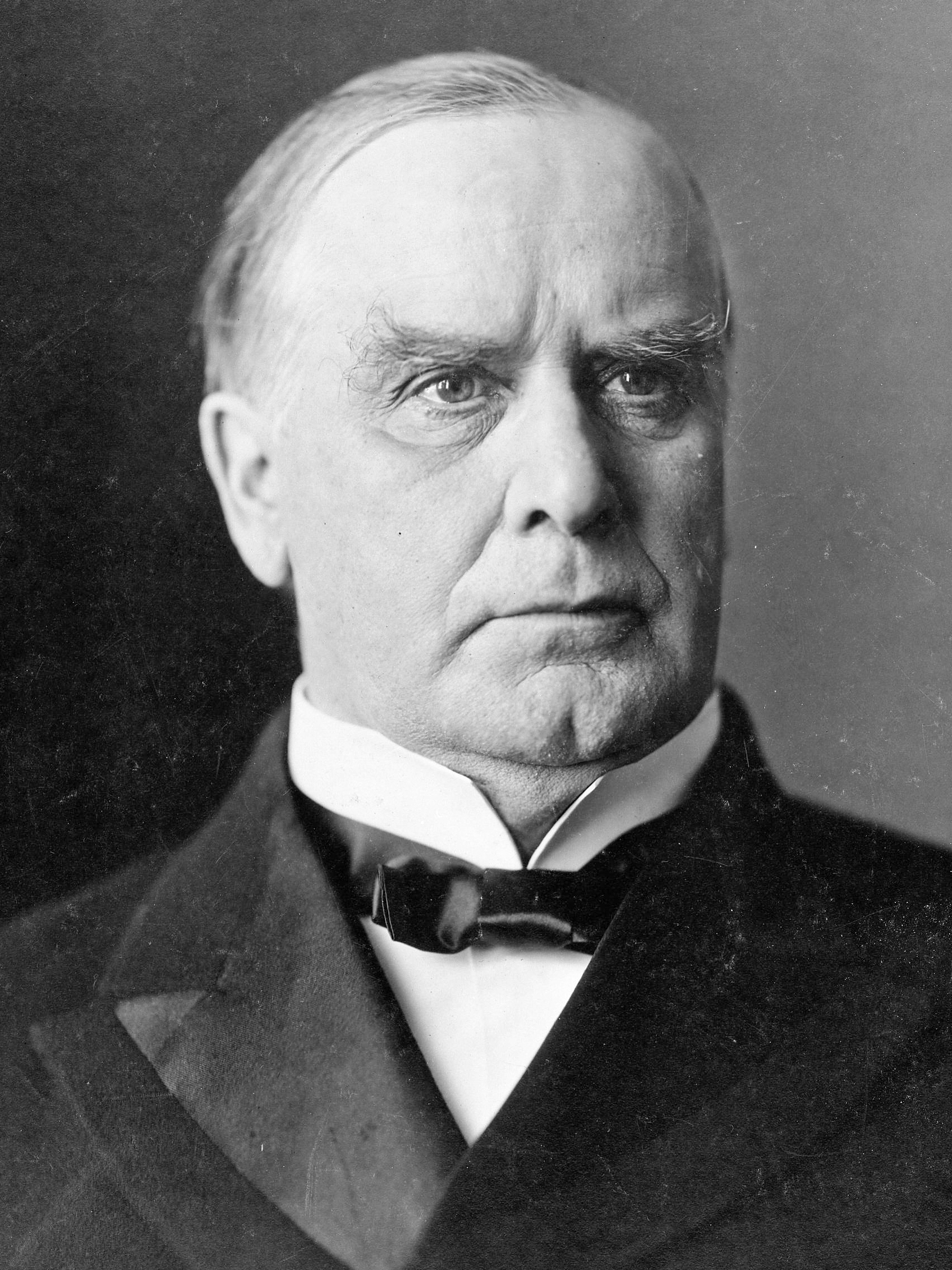
| Nominee | William Jennings Bryan | William McKinley |
| Party | Democratic | Republican |
| Home state | Nebraska | Ohio |
| Running mate | Adlai Stevenson I | Theodore Roosevelt |
| Electoral vote | 11 | 0 |
| Popular vote | 157,733 | 132,997 |
| Percentage | 53.92% | 45.47% |
County results
Bryan
40–50%
50–60%
60–70%
70–80%
90–100%
McKinley
40–50%
50–60%
60–70%
70–80%
President before election
William McKinley
Republican
Elected President
William McKinley
Republican

The 1900 United States presidential election in North Carolina took place on November 6, 1900. All contemporary 45 states were part of the 1900 United States presidential election. Voters chose 11 electors to the Electoral College, which selected the president and vice president.

In the period between this election and that of 1896, North Carolina had seen the 1898 overthrow of its Populist/Republican fusion government by white Democrats in the Wilmington massacre. Following this momentous event, the state would see a radical restructuring of its politics due to the disenfranchisement of its large African-American population, who had provided a substantial – but unlike many Deep South states not overwhelming – proportion of Republican Party support ever since that party first appeared in the state following Reconstruction.

At the same time, the state's Republican Party, now confined to the mountain and northwestern Piedmont areas that had resisted secession and viewed the Democratic Party as a “war party”, would turn almost overnight towards a “lily-white” strategy based on attempting to appeal to businessmen who found the Democratic Party too anti-business and too favorable to using of low-cost black labor instead of whites. The GOP had to some extent followed this strategy in the years before black disenfranchisement because it wanted to appeal to the state's budding industrialists, who were critical of Democratic policies favoring free trade over high tariffs.

Despite the radical changes in the electorate over this and the following election, there was relatively little change in the overall statewide vote in a rematch between Democrat William Jennings Bryan and incumbent Republican President McKinley. Although McKinley lost almost all the GOP's black belt support as its black voters could no longer vote (such as Northampton County, a majority black county which has not voted for a Republican presidential candidate since the 1896 election), he did make extensive gains in majority-white and formerly Democratic regions of the Piedmont and secessionist parts of the mountains. Consequently, thirty-four of the state's ninety-seven counties switched parties despite a minimal statewide vote share change. McKinley was the first Republican to carry Alexander County, Caldwell County, Graham County, Lincoln County, Macon County, Swain County and Yancey County in historically secessionist parts of the mountains and northwestern Piedmont, and also Orange County in the eastern Piedmont.

In addition, Republicans made strong and persistent gains in historically secessionist Sampson County, home of Populist Senator Marion Butler, a key architect of both the Populist-Republican fusion at the state level in North Carolina and the Populist-Democratic fusion at the national level in 1896 with Bryan's nomination. In 1896 Sampson County overwhelmingly voted for Bryan as the Populist fusion candidate, but with the backlash to the overthrow of the Populist-Republican fusion state government, Sampson County swung heavily to the Republican McKinley, as a 67.63%-30.82% Bryan lead over McKinley in 1896 became a 58.64%-36.82% victory for McKinley over Bryan in 1900. Sampson County would remain an isolated island of Republican support down east for decades.

Along with having defeated McKinley in North Carolina four years earlier, Bryan would later win the state again in 1908 against William Howard Taft.

== Results ==
1900 United States presidential election in North Carolina
| Party | Candidate | Votes | Percentage | Electoral votes |
|---|---|---|---|---|
| Democratic | William Jennings Bryan | 157,733 | 53.92% | 11 |
| Republican | William McKinley (incumbent) | 132,997 | 45.47% | 0 |
| Prohibition | John G. Woolley | 990 | 0.34% | 0 |
| Populist | Wharton Barker | 798 | 0.27% | 0 |
| Totals | | 292,518 | 100.00% | 11 |
| Voter turnout | | | | — |

=== Results by county ===
1900 United States presidential election in North Carolina by county
| County | William Jennings Bryan Democratic | | William McKinley Republican | | John Granville Woolley Prohibition | | Wharton Barker Populist | | Margin | |
| County | % | # | % | # | % | # | % | # | % | # |
|---|---|---|---|---|---|---|---|---|---|---|
| New Hanover | 97.40% | 2,247 | 2.60% | 60 | 0.00% | 0 | 0.00% | 0 | 94.80% | 2,187 |
| Scotland | 95.26% | 925 | 4.53% | 44 | 0.21% | 2 | 0.00% | 0 | 90.73% | 881 |
| Robeson | 74.14% | 3,280 | 25.86% | 1,144 | 0.00% | 0 | 0.00% | 0 | 48.28% | 2,136 |
| Anson | 73.24% | 1,856 | 26.56% | 673 | 0.00% | 0 | 0.20% | 5 | 46.69% | 1,183 |
| Richmond | 71.29% | 1,264 | 28.43% | 504 | 0.28% | 5 | 0.00% | 0 | 42.87% | 760 |
| Wilson | 70.19% | 2,816 | 29.76% | 1,194 | 0.05% | 2 | 0.00% | 0 | 40.43% | 1,622 |
| Bertie | 69.40% | 2,420 | 30.60% | 1,067 | 0.00% | 0 | 0.00% | 0 | 38.80% | 1,353 |
| Onslow | 68.14% | 1,322 | 31.86% | 618 | 0.00% | 0 | 0.00% | 0 | 36.29% | 704 |
| Currituck | 68.06% | 927 | 31.94% | 435 | 0.00% | 0 | 0.00% | 0 | 36.12% | 492 |
| Pender | 67.40% | 1,137 | 32.19% | 543 | 0.30% | 5 | 0.12% | 2 | 35.21% | 594 |
| Union | 66.89% | 1,790 | 32.29% | 864 | 0.00% | 0 | 0.82% | 22 | 34.60% | 926 |
| Gates | 66.61% | 1,125 | 33.39% | 564 | 0.00% | 0 | 0.00% | 0 | 33.21% | 561 |
| Nash | 66.04% | 2,600 | 33.96% | 1,337 | 0.00% | 0 | 0.00% | 0 | 32.08% | 1,263 |
| Edgecombe | 64.78% | 3,009 | 35.20% | 1,635 | 0.02% | 1 | 0.00% | 0 | 29.58% | 1,374 |
| Halifax | 64.73% | 3,990 | 35.27% | 2,174 | 0.00% | 0 | 0.00% | 0 | 29.46% | 1,816 |
| Hertford | 64.62% | 1,337 | 35.38% | 732 | 0.00% | 0 | 0.00% | 0 | 29.24% | 605 |
| Duplin | 63.05% | 1,879 | 36.28% | 1,081 | 0.00% | 0 | 0.67% | 20 | 26.78% | 798 |
| Franklin | 62.45% | 2,781 | 35.98% | 1,602 | 0.29% | 13 | 1.28% | 57 | 26.48% | 1,179 |
| Cleveland | 62.25% | 2,228 | 36.63% | 1,311 | 0.59% | 21 | 0.53% | 19 | 25.62% | 917 |
| Greene | 62.61% | 1,385 | 37.07% | 820 | 0.00% | 0 | 0.32% | 7 | 25.54% | 565 |
| Mecklenburg | 62.09% | 3,786 | 36.63% | 2,234 | 0.77% | 47 | 0.51% | 31 | 25.45% | 1,552 |
| Martin | 62.57% | 1,819 | 37.43% | 1,088 | 0.00% | 0 | 0.00% | 0 | 25.15% | 731 |
| Stanly | 61.50% | 1,265 | 38.50% | 792 | 0.00% | 0 | 0.00% | 0 | 22.99% | 473 |
| Lenoir | 61.34% | 1,942 | 38.66% | 1,224 | 0.00% | 0 | 0.00% | 0 | 22.68% | 718 |
| Johnston | 61.03% | 3,154 | 38.64% | 1,997 | 0.02% | 1 | 0.31% | 16 | 22.39% | 1,157 |
| Wayne | 60.79% | 3,104 | 38.48% | 1,965 | 0.72% | 37 | 0.00% | 0 | 22.31% | 1,139 |
| Rowan | 57.34% | 2,460 | 36.25% | 1,555 | 6.06% | 260 | 0.35% | 15 | 21.10% | 905 |
| Pitt | 59.82% | 3,264 | 39.52% | 2,156 | 0.27% | 15 | 0.38% | 21 | 20.31% | 1,108 |
| Granville | 58.80% | 2,288 | 40.79% | 1,587 | 0.05% | 2 | 0.36% | 14 | 18.02% | 701 |
| Vance | 56.98% | 1,233 | 40.71% | 881 | 0.09% | 2 | 2.22% | 48 | 16.27% | 352 |
| Haywood | 57.62% | 1,735 | 41.75% | 1,257 | 0.43% | 13 | 0.20% | 6 | 15.88% | 478 |
| Carteret | 57.57% | 1,046 | 42.21% | 767 | 0.00% | 0 | 0.22% | 4 | 15.35% | 279 |
| Craven | 57.45% | 2,028 | 42.55% | 1,502 | 0.00% | 0 | 0.00% | 0 | 14.90% | 526 |
| Cabarrus | 56.29% | 1,485 | 42.15% | 1,112 | 0.61% | 16 | 0.95% | 25 | 14.14% | 373 |
| Columbus | 56.75% | 1,623 | 43.25% | 1,237 | 0.00% | 0 | 0.00% | 0 | 13.50% | 386 |
| Beaufort | 56.28% | 2,316 | 43.72% | 1,799 | 0.00% | 0 | 0.00% | 0 | 12.56% | 517 |
| Northampton | 55.66% | 1,992 | 44.34% | 1,587 | 0.00% | 0 | 0.00% | 0 | 11.32% | 405 |
| Burke | 55.25% | 1,389 | 44.15% | 1,110 | 0.28% | 7 | 0.32% | 8 | 11.10% | 279 |
| Iredell | 54.32% | 2,523 | 44.00% | 2,044 | 0.37% | 17 | 1.31% | 61 | 10.31% | 479 |
| Dare | 54.97% | 404 | 45.03% | 331 | 0.00% | 0 | 0.00% | 0 | 9.93% | 73 |
| Tyrrell | 54.89% | 466 | 45.11% | 383 | 0.00% | 0 | 0.00% | 0 | 9.78% | 83 |
| Wake | 54.65% | 4,774 | 45.18% | 3,947 | 0.17% | 15 | 0.00% | 0 | 9.47% | 827 |
| Montgomery | 54.43% | 1,100 | 45.52% | 920 | 0.05% | 1 | 0.00% | 0 | 8.91% | 180 |
| Jones | 54.26% | 714 | 45.74% | 602 | 0.00% | 0 | 0.00% | 0 | 8.51% | 112 |
| Gaston | 53.42% | 1,931 | 44.98% | 1,626 | 1.38% | 50 | 0.22% | 8 | 8.44% | 305 |
| Rockingham | 54.05% | 2,652 | 45.89% | 2,252 | 0.06% | 3 | 0.00% | 0 | 8.15% | 400 |
| Warren | 54.05% | 1,573 | 45.95% | 1,337 | 0.00% | 0 | 0.00% | 0 | 8.11% | 236 |
| Durham | 53.71% | 2,373 | 45.86% | 2,026 | 0.32% | 14 | 0.11% | 5 | 7.85% | 347 |
| Person | 53.37% | 1,466 | 46.38% | 1,274 | 0.00% | 0 | 0.25% | 7 | 6.99% | 192 |
| Harnett | 52.79% | 1,342 | 47.17% | 1,199 | 0.04% | 1 | 0.00% | 0 | 5.63% | 143 |
| Hyde | 52.01% | 867 | 47.87% | 798 | 0.00% | 0 | 0.12% | 2 | 4.14% | 69 |
| Alleghany | 51.71% | 709 | 48.29% | 662 | 0.00% | 0 | 0.00% | 0 | 3.43% | 47 |
| Washington | 51.55% | 834 | 48.45% | 784 | 0.00% | 0 | 0.00% | 0 | 3.09% | 50 |
| Catawba | 48.97% | 1,612 | 46.23% | 1,522 | 1.91% | 63 | 2.89% | 95 | 2.73% | 90 |
| Caswell | 51.20% | 1,342 | 48.72% | 1,277 | 0.08% | 2 | 0.00% | 0 | 2.48% | 65 |
| Rutherford | 51.22% | 2,081 | 48.76% | 1,981 | 0.02% | 1 | 0.00% | 0 | 2.46% | 100 |
| Jackson | 50.30% | 1,080 | 48.77% | 1,047 | 0.00% | 0 | 0.93% | 20 | 1.54% | 33 |
| Clay | 50.63% | 404 | 49.37% | 394 | 0.00% | 0 | 0.00% | 0 | 1.25% | 10 |
| Guilford | 49.96% | 3,335 | 49.37% | 3,296 | 0.67% | 45 | 0.00% | 0 | 0.58% | 39 |
| Orange | 49.71% | 1,275 | 49.90% | 1,280 | 0.00% | 0 | 0.39% | 10 | -0.19% | -5 |
| McDowell | 49.34% | 1,014 | 49.83% | 1,024 | 0.44% | 9 | 0.39% | 8 | -0.49% | -10 |
| Perquimans | 49.52% | 830 | 50.48% | 846 | 0.00% | 0 | 0.00% | 0 | -0.95% | -16 |
| Chowan | 49.07% | 898 | 50.93% | 932 | 0.00% | 0 | 0.00% | 0 | -1.86% | -34 |
| Forsyth | 48.70% | 2,482 | 50.77% | 2,588 | 0.53% | 27 | 0.00% | 0 | -2.08% | -106 |
| Macon | 48.46% | 977 | 51.34% | 1,035 | 0.00% | 0 | 0.20% | 4 | -2.88% | -58 |
| Pasquotank | 48.26% | 1,196 | 51.74% | 1,282 | 0.00% | 0 | 0.00% | 0 | -3.47% | -86 |
| Camden | 48.21% | 498 | 51.79% | 535 | 0.00% | 0 | 0.00% | 0 | -3.58% | -37 |
| Bladen | 47.62% | 1,102 | 51.51% | 1,192 | 0.00% | 0 | 0.86% | 20 | -3.89% | -90 |
| Graham | 48.05% | 358 | 51.95% | 387 | 0.00% | 0 | 0.00% | 0 | -3.89% | -29 |
| Cumberland | 47.75% | 1,964 | 51.98% | 2,138 | 0.24% | 10 | 0.02% | 1 | -4.23% | -174 |
| Randolph | 47.37% | 2,264 | 52.04% | 2,487 | 0.59% | 28 | 0.00% | 0 | -4.67% | -223 |
| Buncombe | 47.15% | 3,724 | 52.41% | 4,140 | 0.42% | 33 | 0.03% | 2 | -5.27% | -416 |
| Yancey | 46.86% | 954 | 53.14% | 1,082 | 0.00% | 0 | 0.00% | 0 | -6.29% | -128 |
| Alamance | 45.60% | 1,923 | 53.50% | 2,256 | 0.76% | 32 | 0.14% | 6 | -7.90% | -333 |
| Transylvania | 45.84% | 529 | 53.90% | 622 | 0.26% | 3 | 0.00% | 0 | -8.06% | -93 |
| Caldwell | 45.11% | 1,111 | 53.47% | 1,317 | 1.14% | 28 | 0.28% | 7 | -8.36% | -206 |
| Alexander | 44.53% | 774 | 53.97% | 938 | 1.50% | 26 | 0.00% | 0 | -9.44% | -164 |
| Brunswick | 43.97% | 525 | 53.85% | 643 | 0.00% | 0 | 2.18% | 26 | -9.88% | -118 |
| Pamlico | 45.02% | 597 | 54.98% | 729 | 0.00% | 0 | 0.00% | 0 | -9.95% | -132 |
| Stokes | 44.52% | 1,443 | 55.48% | 1,798 | 0.00% | 0 | 0.00% | 0 | -10.95% | -355 |
| Moore | 44.04% | 1,606 | 55.63% | 2,029 | 0.05% | 2 | 0.27% | 10 | -11.60% | -423 |
| Lincoln | 43.58% | 892 | 55.35% | 1,133 | 0.15% | 3 | 0.93% | 19 | -11.77% | -241 |
| Davidson | 43.44% | 1,823 | 55.49% | 2,329 | 0.45% | 19 | 0.62% | 26 | -12.06% | -506 |
| Ashe | 43.83% | 1,513 | 56.11% | 1,937 | 0.06% | 2 | 0.00% | 0 | -12.28% | -424 |
| Surry | 43.64% | 1,898 | 56.36% | 2,451 | 0.00% | 0 | 0.00% | 0 | -12.72% | -553 |
| Swain | 43.00% | 590 | 57.00% | 782 | 0.00% | 0 | 0.00% | 0 | -13.99% | -192 |
| Polk | 42.34% | 484 | 57.04% | 652 | 0.61% | 7 | 0.00% | 0 | -14.70% | -168 |
| Davie | 39.11% | 831 | 58.87% | 1,251 | 1.74% | 37 | 0.28% | 6 | -19.76% | -420 |
| Cherokee | 39.96% | 774 | 59.73% | 1,157 | 0.00% | 0 | 0.31% | 6 | -19.77% | -383 |
| Chatham | 39.65% | 1,489 | 59.65% | 2,240 | 0.05% | 2 | 0.64% | 24 | -20.00% | -751 |
| Henderson | 39.63% | 973 | 60.37% | 1,482 | 0.00% | 0 | 0.00% | 0 | -20.73% | -509 |
| Sampson | 36.82% | 1,257 | 58.64% | 2,002 | 1.46% | 50 | 3.08% | 105 | -21.82% | -745 |
| Watauga | 39.04% | 923 | 60.87% | 1,439 | 0.08% | 2 | 0.00% | 0 | -21.83% | -516 |
| Wilkes | 37.48% | 1,704 | 62.47% | 2,840 | 0.04% | 2 | 0.00% | 0 | -24.99% | -1,136 |
| Yadkin | 35.32% | 950 | 64.42% | 1,733 | 0.26% | 7 | 0.00% | 0 | -29.11% | -783 |
| Madison | 34.79% | 1,268 | 65.21% | 2,377 | 0.00% | 0 | 0.00% | 0 | -30.43% | -1,109 |
| Mitchell | 20.05% | 491 | 79.95% | 1,958 | 0.00% | 0 | 0.00% | 0 | -59.90% | -1,467 |
