= National Register of Historic Places listings in Dare County, North Carolina =

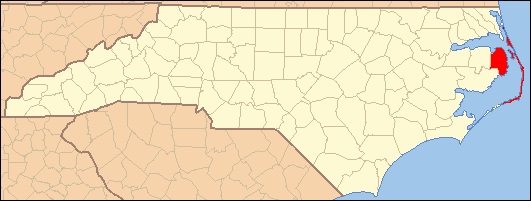

This list includes properties and districts listed on the National Register of Historic Places in Dare County, North Carolina, United States. Click the "Map of all coordinates" link to the right to view an online map of all properties and districts with latitude and longitude coordinates in the table below.

== Current listings ==
This National Park Service list is complete through NPS recent listings posted December 12, 2025.

	Name on the Register	Image	Date listed	Location	City or town	Description
1	Ellsworth and Lovie Ballance House	Ellsworth and Lovie Ballance House	May 25, 2001 (#01000558)	E side M.V. Australia Ln., 0.1 miles S of Stowe Landing Rd. 35°13′21″N 75°41′13″W	Hatteras	
2	Bodie Island Lifesaving/Coast Guard Station	Bodie Island Lifesaving/Coast Guard Station	February 9, 1979 (#79000251)	S of Nags Head on NC 12; 35°50′11″N 75°33′33″W	Nags Head	
3	Bodie Island Light Station	Bodie Island Light Station	July 4, 2003 (#03000607)	Off NC 12; 35°49′12″N 75°33′49″W	Nags Head	
4	C.S.S. CURLEW (side-wheel steamer)	C.S.S. CURLEW (side-wheel steamer)	August 24, 2018 (#100002802)	Address restricted	Manns Harbor	
5	Caffeys Inlet Lifesaving Station		January 30, 1978 (#78001942)	N of Duck on SR 1200; 36°13′33″N 75°46′15″W	Duck	
6	Cape Hatteras Light Station	Cape Hatteras Light Station	March 29, 1978 (#78000266)	SE of Buxton off NC 12 in Cape Hatteras National Seashore; 35°15′16″N 75°31′17″W	Buxton	
7	Chicamacomico Life Saving Station	Chicamacomico Life Saving Station	December 12, 1976 (#76000164)	NC 12 and SR 1247; 35°35′42″N 75°27′54″W	Rodanthe	
8	George Washington Creef House	George Washington Creef House	August 12, 1982 (#82004798)	304 Budleigh St. 35°54′29″N 75°40′18″W	Manteo	
9	Herbert and Ann Creef House		April 11, 2025 (#100011674)	301 Budleigh Street; 35°54′34″N 75°40′19″W	Manteo	
10	John T. Daniels House	John T. Daniels House	May 1, 2003 (#03000339)	960 Burnside Rd. 35°54′25″N 75°41′00″W	Manteo	
11	DIXIE ARROW (shipwreck and remains)	DIXIE ARROW (shipwreck and remains)	September 25, 2013 (#13000781)	Address restricted 34°55′00″N 75°02′00″W	Ocracoke	
12	E.M. CLARK (shipwreck and remains)		September 25, 2013 (#13000780)	Address restricted	Cape Hatteras	
13	EMPIRE GEM (shipwreck and remains)	EMPIRE GEM (shipwreck and remains)	September 25, 2013 (#13000782)	Address restricted	Cape Hatteras	
14	Adam Dough Etheridge House	Adam Dough Etheridge House	August 11, 2025 (#100012088)	1140 Highway 64; 35°55′44″N 75°41′14″W	Manteo vicinity	
15	First Colony Inn	First Colony Inn	January 21, 1993 (#92001835)	6720 S. Virginia Dare Trail; 35°55′06″N 75°36′13″W	Nags Head	
16	Fort Raleigh National Historic Site	Fort Raleigh National Historic Site	October 15, 1966 (#66000102)	4 miles N of Manteo on U.S. 158; 35°56′19″N 75°42′36″W	Manteo	
17	Hatteras Weather Bureau Station	Hatteras Weather Bureau Station	February 17, 1978 (#78000268)	Off NC 12; 35°13′12″N 75°41′26″W	Hatteras	
18	Kitty Hawk Life-Saving Station	Kitty Hawk Life-Saving Station	October 11, 1984 (#84000073)	U.S. 158; 36°04′02″N 75°41′28″W	Kitty Hawk	
19	LANCING (shipwreck)	LANCING (shipwreck)	June 26, 2013 (#13000451)	Address restricted	Buxton	
20	LIGHT VESSEL 71 (shipwreck)	LIGHT VESSEL 71 (shipwreck)	August 19, 2015 (#15000541)	Address restricted	Buxton	
21	Markham-Albertson-Stinson Cottage	Markham-Albertson-Stinson Cottage	January 13, 2006 (#05001544)	4300 W. Soundside Rd. 35°56′46″N 75°37′46″W	Nags Head	Destroyed by Hurricane Irene
22	Theodore S. Meekins House	Theodore S. Meekins House	December 17, 1982 (#82001295)	319 Sir Walter Raleigh St. 35°54′31″N 75°40′22″W	Manteo	
23	Mattie Midgett Store and House	Mattie Midgett Store and House	December 23, 2004 (#04001389)	4008 S. Virginia Dare Trail; 35°57′23″N 75°37′28″W	Nags Head	
24	Rasmus Midgett House	Rasmus Midgett House	October 21, 2009 (#09000847)	25438 NC Hwy 12; 35°32′42″N 75°28′16″W	Waves	
25	Nags Head Beach Cottages Historic District	Nags Head Beach Cottages Historic District	August 19, 1977 (#77000997)	U.S. 158; 35°57′50″N 75°35′49″W	Nags Head	
26	Oregon Inlet Station	Oregon Inlet Station	December 23, 1975 (#75001253)	12 miles N of Rodanthe on Pea Island; 35°46′06″N 75°31′28″W	Rodanthe	
27	Salvo Post Office	Salvo Post Office	September 23, 1993 (#93000997)	NC 12 W side, 0.1 miles S of jct. with Park Rd. 35°32′24″N 75°28′27″W	Salvo	
28	Sam's Diner	Sam's Diner	January 27, 1999 (#99000062)	2008 S. Virginia Dare Trail; 35°59′46″N 75°38′50″W	Kill Devil Hills	
29	Sea Foam Motel	Sea Foam Motel	December 23, 2004 (#04001392)	7111 S. Virginia Dare Trail; 35°54′37″N 75°35′47″W	Nags Head	
30	U-85 (submarine) shipwreck and remains	U-85 (submarine) shipwreck and remains	November 12, 2015 (#15000805)	Offshore; 35°54′48″N 75°17′13″W	Nags Head	
31	U-576 and BLUEFIELDS (shipwrecks and remains)	U-576 and BLUEFIELDS (shipwrecks and remains)	December 8, 2015 (#15000864)	Address restricted	Hatteras	
32	U-701 (submarine) shipwreck and remains	U-701 (submarine) shipwreck and remains	November 12, 2015 (#15000806)	Offshore; 35°14′21″N 75°06′43″W	Buxton	
33	USS HURON	USS HURON	November 15, 1991 (#91001625)	Shipwreck off Nags Head; 35°58′39″N 75°37′51″W	Nags Head	
34	USS MONITOR	USS MONITOR	October 11, 1974 (#74002299)	Shipwreck off Cape Hatteras; 35°00′06″N 75°24′23″W	Cape Hatteras	
35	Wright Brothers National Memorial	Wright Brothers National Memorial	October 15, 1966 (#66000071)	U.S. 158; 36°00′58″N 75°40′12″W	Kill Devil Hills	

== See also ==
- National Register of Historic Places listings in North Carolina
- List of National Historic Landmarks in North Carolina
