= USS YP-389 =

Coordinates: 34°50′0″N 75°19′59″W

History

United States
- Name: USS YP-389
- Builder: Bethlehem Shipbuilding Corp., Quincy, Massachusetts
- Launched: 1941
- Completed: 9 October 1941
- Acquired: 6 February 1942
- Reclassified: AMc-202, 6 February 1942; YP-389, 1 May 1942
- Fate: Sunk, 19 June 1942

General characteristics
- Type: Patrol boat
- Displacement: 170 long tons (170 t)
- Propulsion: Diesel engine; 1 × screw
- Armament: 1 × 3 in (76 mm)/50 cal dual-purpose gun, 2 × .30 cal (7.62 mm) machine guns

USS YP-389 was a United States Navy yard patrol (YP) boat that served in World War II. The ship was built in 1941 as the fishing trawler Cohasset at the Fore River Shipyard in Quincy, Massachusetts, for R. O'Brien and Company.

Acquired by the Navy on 6 February 1942, she was originally designated as a coastal minesweeper, AMc-202, but was reclassified as a District Patrol Craft, YP-389, on 1 May 1942. The 170 long tons (170 t) ship was equipped with one 3 in (76 mm) dual-purpose gun to protect the ship from enemy aircraft and surfaced submarines and two .30 in (7.6 mm) machine guns.

YP-389 was sunk by a German submarine on 19 June 1942.

== Loss ==
=== Background ===
U-701, under Captain Lieutenant Horst Degen, was a very successful U-boat during the war. She was a Type VIIC submarine, displacing 1,070 tons, sent to American waters to destroy allied shipping. An American mine field had been laid off Cape Hatteras to deter U-boat attacks but after an American merchantman struck a mine and sank, the small 170-ton naval trawler USS YP-389, under Lieutenant R. J. Phillips, was ordered to patrol the area and warn friendly ships of the mines. The trawler was armed with one 3-inch gun, two machine guns and four depth charges. However the 3-inch gun had a broken firing pin which could not be repaired before going out on patrol. The trawler also lacked degaussing equipment and sonar. This meant she had to be careful around the mines and could only attack a submarine with her machine guns and the depth charges if it was spotted visually.

U-701 first made contact with YP-389 on or about 10 June 1942 but Captain Degen decided to leave the trawler alone so as to not alert other warships in the area. On 12 June, U-701 mined the channel into Chesapeake Bay.

For several days afterwards, it seemed as though every time U-701 surfaced each night, the YP-389 was on patrol nearby as if it was following the submarine. However, reports indicate that the Americans had no idea of the Germans' presence until the morning of 19 June. On that day Degen came across the YP-389 accidentally in misty conditions and attacked her to prevent the Americans from giving his position away.

=== Battle ===
The battle began at about 2:45 am and occurred five miles off Diamond Shoals: the Germans used their 88-millimeter deck gun and a 20-millimeter anti-aircraft gun instead of torpedoes, because their target was so small, and when they opened fire the Americans were completely surprised. For over an hour and half the engagement was a chase. U-701 pursued the American boat firing with both guns but it was difficult to hit the trawler in the darkness. It was mainly muzzle flashes from the machine guns on YP-389 that gave the Germans something to aim at. Lieutenant Phillips thought that by releasing his depth charges in front of the chasing U-boat he might be able to damage it or at least scare the Germans off so for the last few moments of the engagement, the Americans dropped charges until being overwhelmed by gunfire. When the YP-389 began to sink, Lieutenant Phillips ordered his men to abandon ship and the battle ended.

=== Aftermath ===
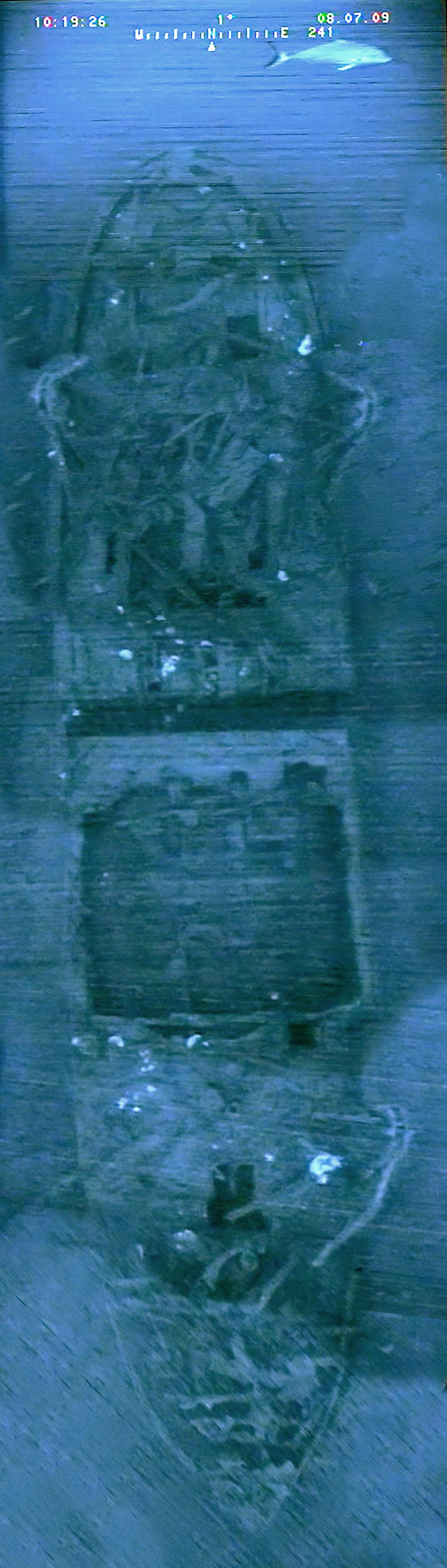
Photo mosaic of USS YP-389's wreck in 2009.

Six American sailors were killed in action and eighteen others went into the water without lifeboats because lowering them meant being exposed to accurate enemy fire and the liferafts had all been shot away. The U-701 was slightly damaged though no casualties were sustained. U-701 continued to scour the American East Coast for a few more weeks until being sunk by United States Army bombers not far from Diamond Shoals (7 July 1942).

In August 2009, a National Oceanic and Atmospheric Administration-led team aboard the NOAA research ship NOAAS Nancy Foster (R 352) found and photographed a wreck 20 nautical miles (37 km; 23 mi) off Cape Hatteras, North Carolina, and on 9 September 2009 the team's leader announced that the wreck had been identified as that of YP-389. The wreck rests in about 300 feet (91 m) of water in a region known as the "Graveyard of the Atlantic," where several U.S. Navy and Royal Navy vessels, merchant ships, and German U-boats were sunk during the Battle of the Atlantic.

== See also ==
- Torpedo Alley (North Carolina)
- Attacks on North America during World War II
