= Beekeeping in Iran =

Overview of apiculture in Iran

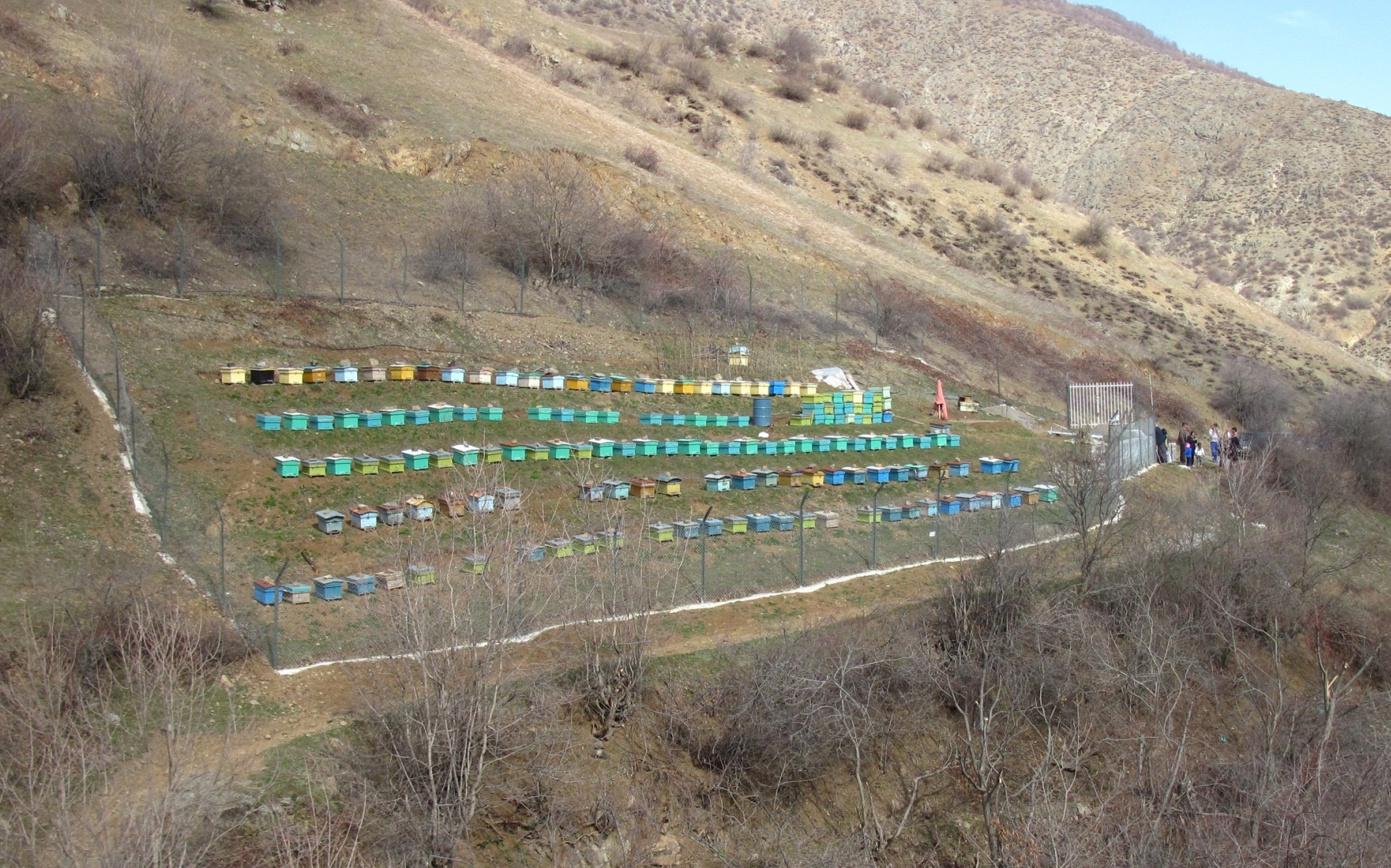
A hillside apiary in Arasbaran region, Iran

Beekeeping in Iran is the keeping of honey bee colonies in Iran for honey and other hive products. Iran ranks among the world's larger honey producers, and its mix of climates and vegetation supports beekeeping in many provinces. The native bee is the Persian honey bee (Apis mellifera meda).

== History ==
Movable frame hives in a village in Khafr, Isfahan province, Iran

Honey and bees have a long history in Iran. The FAO dates beekeeping in the country back to the time of the Persian Empire. The Bundahishn, a Middle Persian Zoroastrian text, mentions the honey bee, and other Middle Persian writings refer to honey and its uses.

Traditional hives were built from whatever local materials were at hand. Movable-frame hives caught on in the 1950s, and traditional beekeeping declined sharply after that. A 1986 report by the Iranian Ministry of Agriculture, cited by the FAO, counted 1,331,877 colonies, fewer than a quarter of them in traditional hives. Modern hives gave higher average yields. The same period saw problems with bee diseases, and imported queens raised concerns about the genetic makeup of native populations. The beekeeping in Iran has also been documented in historical sources.

== Bees ==
Iranian beekeeping uses the western honey bee (Apis mellifera). The local subspecies, A. m. meda, is native to Iran and neighbouring parts of northern Iraq and southeastern Turkey. In 1985 Ruttner, Pourasghar and Kauhausen studied 63 Iranian samples and grouped them with bees from the Iraqi highlands and southeastern Anatolia. They found populations in the northeast, the Caspian region, the western and central highlands including Azerbaijan, and the southeast.

A 2020 study sampled bees from 19 areas of Iran. Morphometric and genetic tests separated them from A. m. mellifera, A. m. carnica, A. m. caucasica and A. m. ligustica, the subspecies most used commercially, while reference A. m. meda samples overlapped with the Iranian bees. The complete mitochondrial genome of the subspecies was published in 2017.

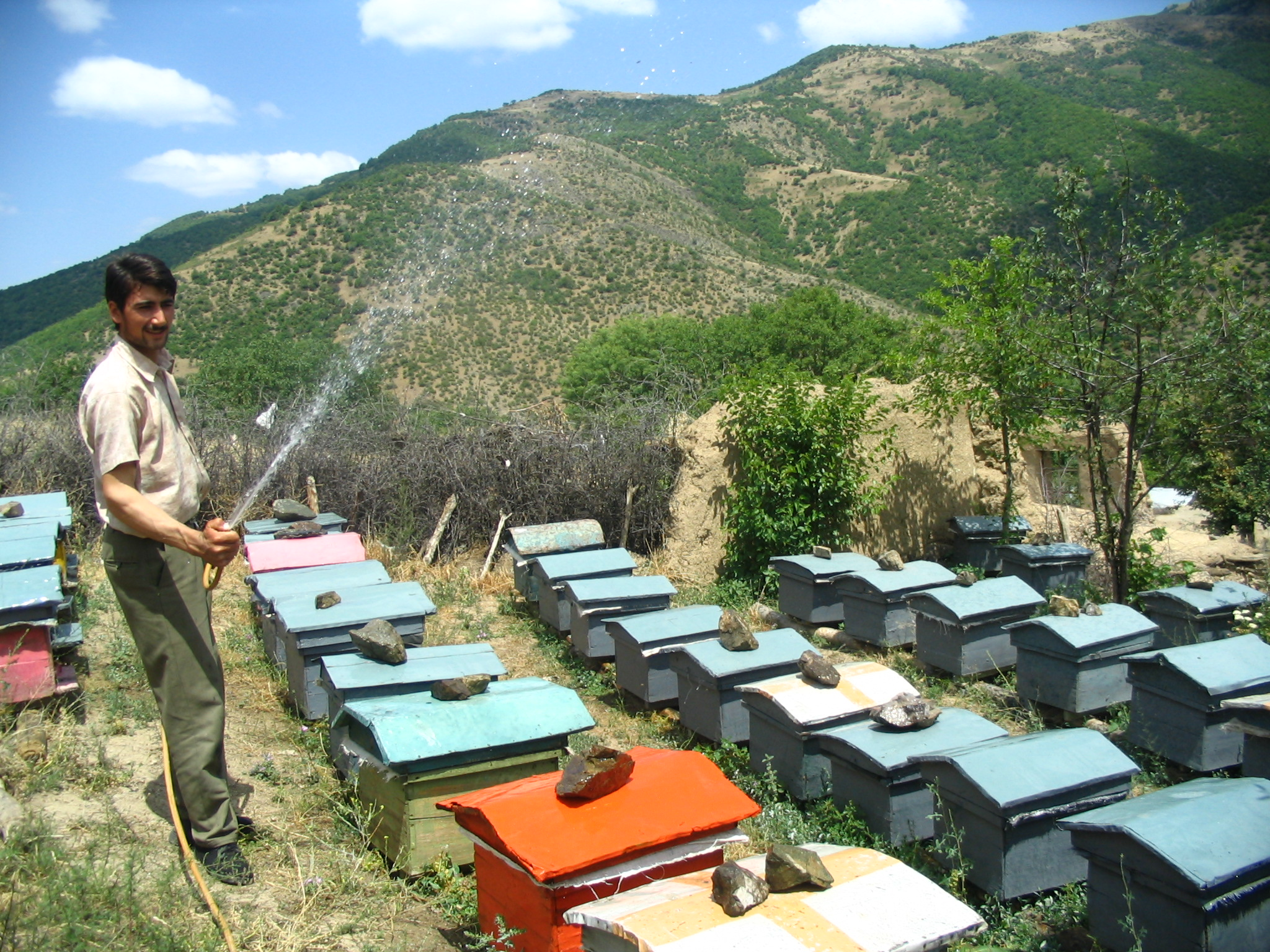
A beekeeper tending hives in Arasbaran, Iran

== Production and regions ==
FAO figures put Iran's 2018 output at about 77,567 tonnes, an imputed estimate that placed it in the world's top ten that year. Using FAOSTAT data, a 2021 study ranked Iran ninth by average annual production between 1993 and 2018.

Older FAO reporting lists East Azerbaijan, West Azerbaijan, Gilan, Mazandaran, Isfahan, Tehran, Fars, Lorestan, Kerman, Hamadan and Markazi as the main beekeeping centres. More recent agricultural data cited in the 2021 study rank East Azerbaijan, West Azerbaijan and Ardabil as the top three provinces. Together with Isfahan, where the Khansar area is known for honey, they made up roughly 58% of national production.

Many beekeepers practise migratory beekeeping, moving hives long distances through the year to follow flowering and avoid harsh weather. This makes it harder to trace where a given honey comes from, and researchers have tested DNA metabarcoding as a way to do it.

== Floral sources ==
Honey samples in the 2021 study came from the Irano-Turanian, Euxine-Hyrcanian and Zagros floristic regions. Pollen analysis of 225 samples found 101 plant taxa, mostly from Fabaceae, Asteraceae, Apiaceae, Rosaceae and Brassicaceae. Astragalus (milkvetch, locally gavan) and Eryngium pollen turned up often, though the authors did not classify any sample as unifloral on that basis because international criteria for these two genera are lacking. Pollen from well-known unifloral sources was also present, including rapeseed, Citrus, sunflower, lime, clover and jujube.

== Quality and adulteration ==
The same 2021 study tested its 225 samples with pollen analysis, sensory evaluation, NMR and standard physicochemical methods. By the authors' criteria, 85% showed signs of adulteration. The most common cause was feeding bees table sugar or C4 sugar syrup during the foraging season, which left raised levels of sucrose, maltose and C4 sugars. Whether a honey was crystallized or runny said nothing about whether it was genuine.

A 2022 survey of 25 brands sold in Khorasan found that 17 failed at least one quality criterion. The authors pointed to poor storage, heating and possible sugar adulteration. A 2025 paper compared conventional tests with isotope-ratio mass spectrometry for detecting adulteration under the standards of the Institute of Standards and Industrial Research of Iran.
