= FV Nyggjaberg =

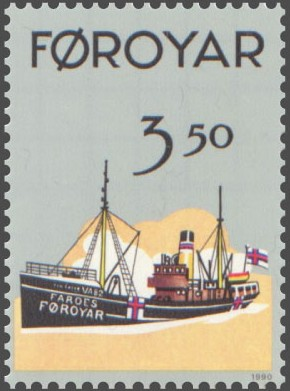
- Nyggjaberg on a Faroe stamp.

History
- Name: (United Kingdom) HMT St. Hubert (FY3306) (1916-1919); (United Kingdom) FV St. Hubert (H493) (1919-1922); FV St. Hubert (1922-1923); (United Kingdom) FV St. Hubert (H493) (1923-1939); (Faroe Islands) FV Nyggjaberg (1939-1942)
- Owner: Ellefsen & Mortensen
- Builder: Cook, Welton & Gemmell Ltd.
- Yard number: 244
- Launched: 19 June 1916
- Completed: September 1916
- Identification: OZAL
- Fate: Torpedoed and sunk 7 March 1942

General characteristics
- Type: Trawler
- Tonnage: 272 GRT
- Length: 42.7 metres (140 ft 1 in)
- Beam: 7.3 metres (23 ft 11 in)
- Depth: 4 metres (13 ft 1 in)
- Installed power: 1 x 3 cyl. triple expansion steam engine
- Propulsion: Screw propeller
- Speed: 10.5 knots
- Crew: 21

FV Nyggjaberg was a Faeroese Trawler that was torpedoed by the German submarine U-701 in the Atlantic Ocean southeast of Iceland on 7 March 1942 while she was travelling from the Faroe Islands to the Icelandic Fishing grounds.

== Construction ==
Nyggjaberg was launched in June 1916 at the Cook, Welton & Gemmell Ltd. shipyard in Hull, United Kingdom and completed in September of the same year. The ship was 42.7 metres (140 ft 1 in) long, had a beam of 7.3 metres (23 ft 11 in) and had a depth of 4 metres (13 ft 1 in). She was assessed at 272 GRT and had 1 x 3 cyl. triple expansion steam engine driving a single screw propeller. The ship could generate 82 n.h.p. with a speed of 10.5 knots.

== Sinking ==
Nyggjaberg left the Faroe Islands for the Icelandic Fishing grounds on 15 February 1942. On 7 March 1942 at 23.14 pm when she was hit on starboard side by a G7e torpedo from the German submarine U-701 southeast of Iceland. She sank within two minutes with no survivors from her 21-man crew.

== Wreck ==
The wreck of Nyggjaberg lies at (63°09′N 13°22′W).
