= E. F. Phillips =

American apiculturist, scholar, and innovator (1878–1951)

Everett Franklin Phillips
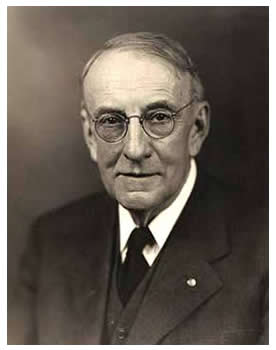
- Born: 1878
- Died: 1951 (aged 72–73)
- Education: Cornell University
- Occupations: Apiculturist, scholar, inventor, author
- Known for: Beekeeping innovations

Everett Franklin Phillips (14 November 1878 – 21 August 1951) was an American apiculturist who served as an influential professor of apiculture at Cornell University. He collected nearly all the literature in English on bees and it is now part of the library of Cornell University as the E. F. Phillip Memorial Beekeeping Library.

== Life and work ==
Phillips was born in Hannibal, Ohio, the son of a Methodist clergyman. He went to Allegheny College before going for graduate studies at the University of Pennsylvania in the early 1900s. He spent summers of 1903 and 1904 at Medina where he met Amos Root and his family, becoming a close friend of Ernest Rob Root. He took on a position with the United States Department of Agriculture (USDA) where he spearheaded efforts to bring the U.S. beekeeping industry to modern scientific standards. Not only did this work help beekeeping practitioners and scholars, it also played a part in the 400% increase in commercial honey production that Phillips oversaw during World War I. After the war Walter J. Quick was involved in vocational training for war veterans. He considered beekeeping as a key vocation and worked along with Phillips to encourage apiculture.

In 1924, Phillips joined the faculty of Cornell University as professor of apiculture. There, together with long-time friend and major U.S. apiculturist E. R. Root, he worked to establish a world-class beekeeping library. An endowment fund started by the New York State Beekeepers’ Association, supplemented with proceeds from the Dyce Honey Patent—an innovation in the production of creamed honey patented by Elton J. Dyce, also of Cornell—made possible the purchase of new library acquisitions over the years. The E. F. Phillips Beekeeping Collection, housed at the A. R. Mann Library at Cornell University, is today one of the largest beekeeping libraries in the world, containing some of the oldest existing beekeeping treatises, complete collections of writings by famed apiculturists such as L. L. Langstroth and Moses Quinby, and apitherapist and friend Bodog F. Beck and an ever-growing number of new publications. He also encouraged other researchers including those of the anatomist R. E. Snodgrass.

In 1932 professor E. F. Phillips was invited to the Soviet Union, Republic of Georgia and spent a month visiting various beekeeping and bee research establishments. E. F. Phillips paid special attention to the unique characteristics of the Apis mellifera maucasia (Caucasian honey bee) and its potential in Georgia.

Phillips and his wife Mary Geisler Phillips, continued to work at expanding the beekeeping library at Cornell until his death in 1951.

== Other sources ==
- Morris-Knower, James P. "Beeman of Ithaca: E. Franklin Phillips & the Phillips’ Beekeeping Collection at Cornell's Albert R. Mann Library." Bee Culture Nov (2000): 23-25.
- Caron, Dewey M.. "Dr. E. F. Phillips." EAS Meeting. University of Delaware, Aug 2002
- A beekeeping visit to the Soviet Union. By Eva Crane. Bee World 44 (2) 48 – 76 DATE: 1963
