= Nags Head, North Carolina =

- Town
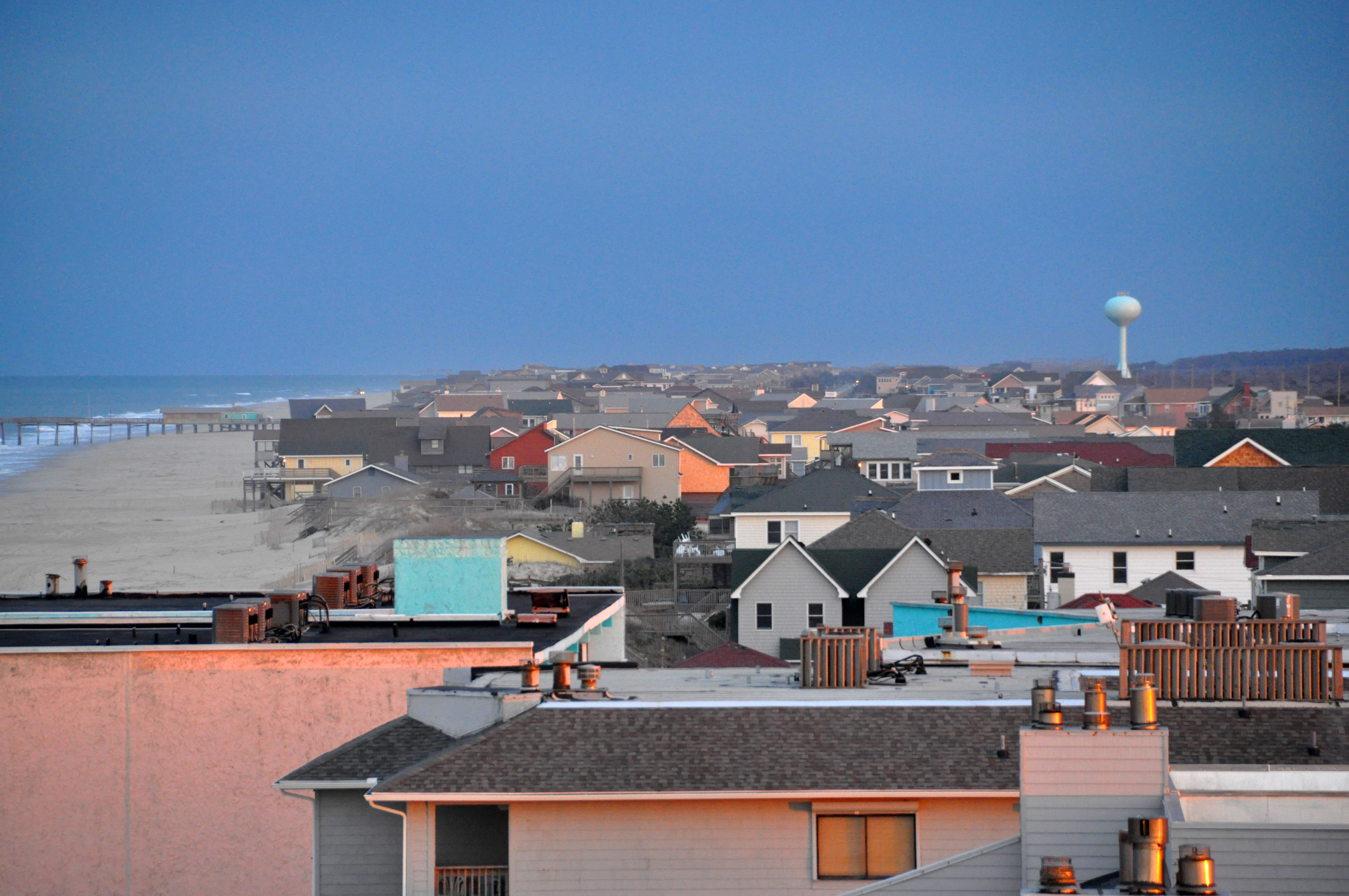
- Nags Head beachfront

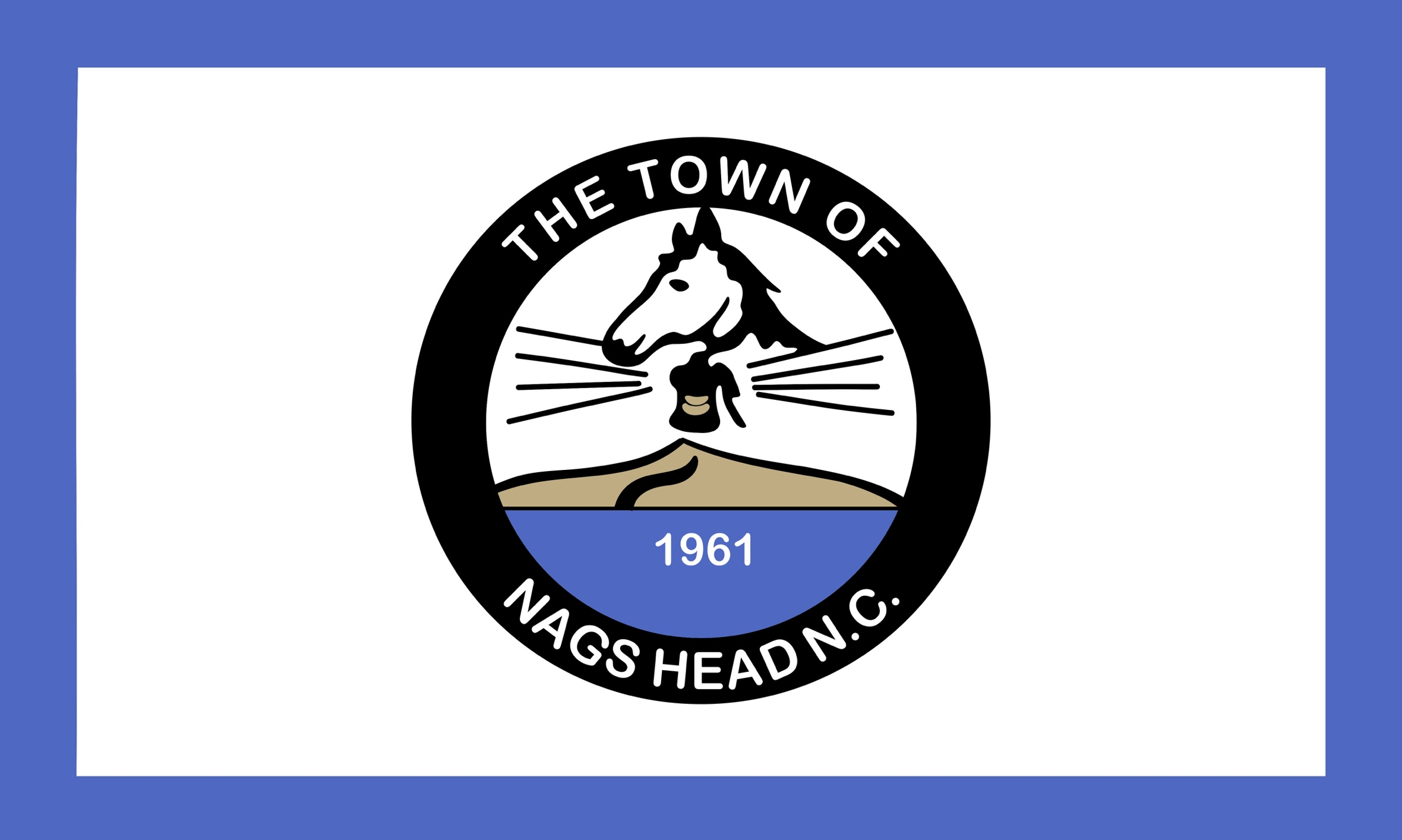
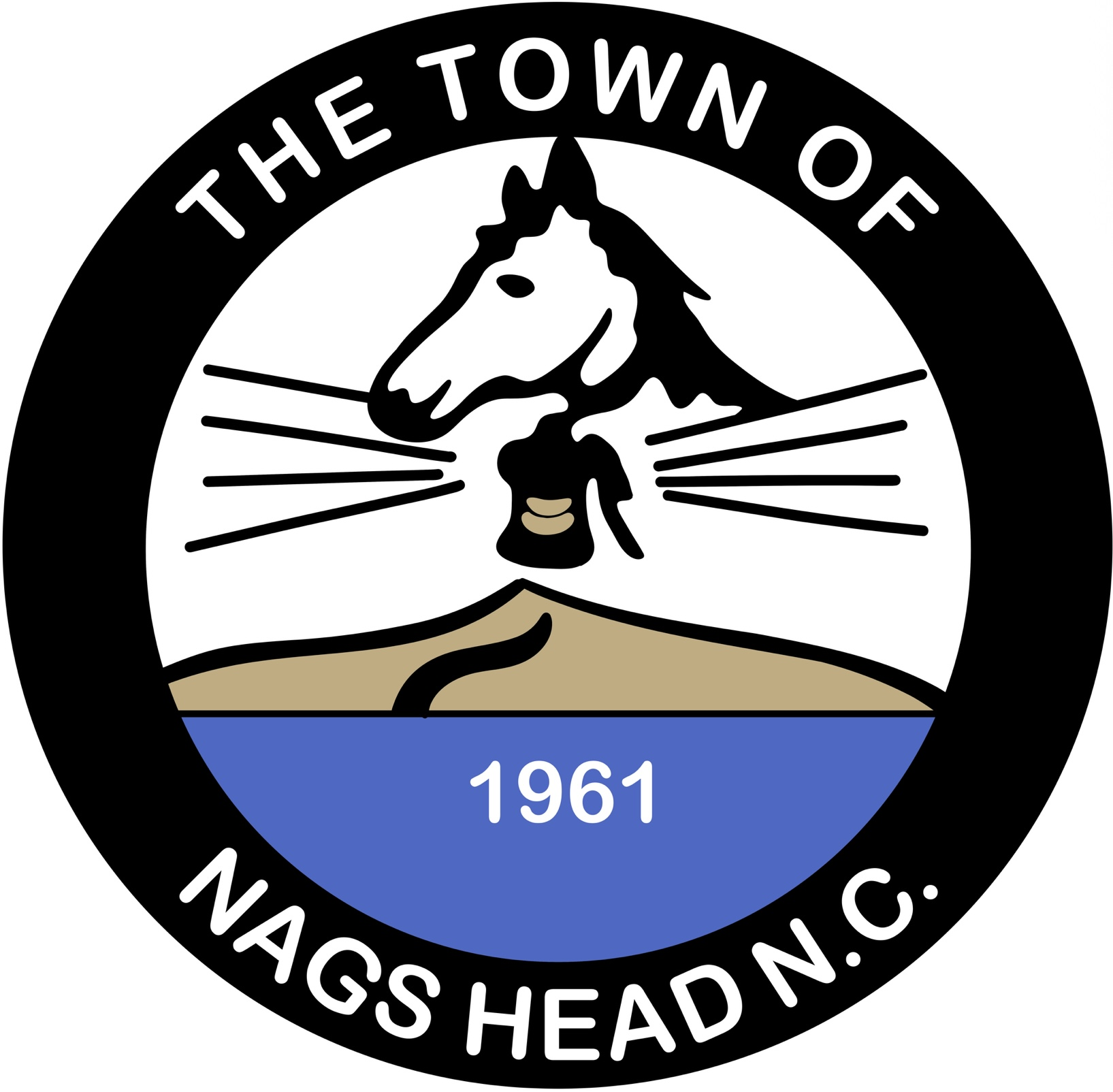
- Flag Seal

- Location in Dare County, North Carolina

- Location within North Carolina Location within the United States
- Coordinates: 35°55′55″N 75°36′54″W
- Country: United States
- State: North Carolina
- County: Dare
- Incorporated: 1923 and 1961
- Named for: Tied lanterns around the necks of ponies

Government
  - Mayor: Ben Cahoon

Area
  - Total: 6.68 sq mi (17.31 km^{2})
  - Land: 6.62 sq mi (17.14 km^{2})
  - Water: 0.066 sq mi (0.17 km^{2})
- Elevation: 3.3 ft (1 m)

Population (2020)
  - Total: 3,168
  - Density: 478.7/sq mi (184.84/km^{2})
- Time zone: UTC−5 (Eastern (EST))
  - Summer (DST): UTC−4 (EDT)
- ZIP Code: 27959
- Area code: 252
- FIPS code: 37-45880
- GNIS feature ID: 1021599
- Website: nagsheadnc.gov

Nags Head is a town in Dare County, North Carolina, United States. It is a busy vacation spot because of its beaches and sand dunes of Jockey's Ridge. The population was 3,146 at the 2020 census.

== History ==
Early maps of the area show Nags Head as a promontory of land characterized by high sand dunes visible from miles at sea. The origin of the town's name is obscure but it is likely to have been named after any one of the places called Nag's Head on the English coast.

A folkloric explanation claims that mules or horses (nags) would have lights hung on their heads by nefarious wreckers in order to trick ships into running aground and then loot the ships of their valuables. The town's emblem depicts one such equine accomplice from the tale.

Around 1830, Nags Head became known as a resort area. This direction was accelerated in 1855 when Dr. W. G. Pool bought 50 acres of oceanfront land which he separated into plots and sold to friends, increasing the number of homes in the area.

Jockey's Ridge is the last vestige of the sand dunes seen by the first explorers, as the area is now highly developed. The town incorporated in 1961.

=== Energy and design improvements ===
In May 2021, Nags Head was one of 11 communities (along with nearby Ocracoke, North Carolina) chosen by the United States Department of Energy to participate in the Energy Transitions Initiative Partnership Project, a program to provide federal aid for remote communities to modernize their electric infrastructure and resiliency through natural disasters and outages. Nags Head's grant is used to secure 48–72 hours of backup energy for emergency services due to the community's vulnerability to severe weather and rising sea levels and to investigate renewable and energy efficiency options. According to Nag's Head's Director of Planning and Development Michael Zehner, the project will take 12–18 months to complete and the town will receive assistance from National Renewable Energy Laboratory and the Sandia National Laboratories.

Nags Head received a separate grant from the North Carolina Chapter of the American Institute of Architects to receive technical assistance in developing better building design practices for energy and water efficiency, a project with an expected completion in early 2022.

== Geography ==
Nags Head is located at 35°55′55″N 75°36′54″W (35.932004, −75.615085).

According to the United States Census Bureau, the town has a total area of 6.6 square miles (17.2 km^{2}), of which 6.6 square miles (17.0 km^{2}) is land and 0.1 square miles (0.2 km^{2}), or 1.15%, is water.

According to the A. W. Kuchler U.S. potential natural vegetation types, Nags Head, North Carolina would have a dominant vegetation type of Live oak/Sea Oats Uniola paniculata (90) with a dominant vegetation form of Coastal Prairie (20).

=== Climate ===
According to the Trewartha climate classification system, Nags Head, North Carolina has a humid subtropical climate with hot and humid summers, cool winters and year-around precipitation (Cfak). Cfak climates are characterized by all months having an average mean temperature > 32.0 °F (> 0.0 °C), at least eight months with an average mean temperature ≥ 50.0 °F (≥ 10.0 °C), at least one month with an average mean temperature ≥ 71.6 °F (≥ 22.0 °C) and no significant precipitation difference between seasons. During the summer months in Nags Head, a cooling afternoon sea breeze is present on most days, but episodes of extreme heat and humidity can occur with heat index values ≥ 100 °F (≥ 38 °C). Nags Head is prone to hurricane strikes, particularly during the Atlantic hurricane season which extends from June 1 through November 30, sharply peaking from late August through September. During the winter months, episodes of cold and wind can occur with wind chill values < 10 °F (< −12 °C). The plant hardiness zone in Nags Head is 8b with an average annual extreme minimum air temperature of 16.9 °F (−8.4 °C). The average seasonal (Dec–Mar) snowfall total is < 2 inches (< 5 cm), and the average annual peak in nor'easter activity is in February.

Climate data for Nags Head, NC (1981–2010 averages)
| Month | Jan | Feb | Mar | Apr | May | Jun | Jul | Aug | Sep | Oct | Nov | Dec | Year |
|---|---|---|---|---|---|---|---|---|---|---|---|---|---|
| Mean daily maximum °F (°C) | 51.3 (10.7) | 53.1 (11.7) | 58.6 (14.8) | 66.9 (19.4) | 74.3 (23.5) | 81.8 (27.7) | 85.5 (29.7) | 84.4 (29.1) | 79.9 (26.6) | 71.6 (22.0) | 63.5 (17.5) | 55.3 (12.9) | 68.9 (20.5) |
| Daily mean °F (°C) | 44.3 (6.8) | 46.0 (7.8) | 51.1 (10.6) | 59.3 (15.2) | 67.2 (19.6) | 75.6 (24.2) | 79.7 (26.5) | 78.8 (26.0) | 74.4 (23.6) | 65.5 (18.6) | 56.7 (13.7) | 48.3 (9.1) | 62.3 (16.8) |
| Mean daily minimum °F (°C) | 37.3 (2.9) | 38.8 (3.8) | 43.5 (6.4) | 51.7 (10.9) | 60.1 (15.6) | 69.4 (20.8) | 73.9 (23.3) | 73.2 (22.9) | 69.0 (20.6) | 59.3 (15.2) | 49.8 (9.9) | 41.4 (5.2) | 55.7 (13.2) |
| Average precipitation inches (mm) | 4.35 (110) | 3.74 (95) | 3.73 (95) | 3.37 (86) | 3.68 (93) | 4.28 (109) | 5.12 (130) | 6.09 (155) | 5.63 (143) | 3.94 (100) | 3.83 (97) | 3.88 (99) | 51.64 (1,312) |
| Average relative humidity (%) | 69.6 | 69.5 | 67.2 | 67.4 | 70.3 | 73.4 | 75.3 | 74.7 | 73.8 | 70.9 | 72.1 | 71.2 | 71.3 |
| Average dew point °F (°C) | 35.0 (1.7) | 36.6 (2.6) | 40.6 (4.8) | 48.5 (9.2) | 57.2 (14.0) | 66.5 (19.2) | 71.2 (21.8) | 70.1 (21.2) | 65.5 (18.6) | 55.8 (13.2) | 47.8 (8.8) | 39.4 (4.1) | 52.9 (11.6) |
Source: PRISM

Climate data for Duck, NC, ocean water temperature (21 NW Nags Head)
| Month | Jan | Feb | Mar | Apr | May | Jun | Jul | Aug | Sep | Oct | Nov | Dec | Year |
|---|---|---|---|---|---|---|---|---|---|---|---|---|---|
| Daily mean °F (°C) | 45 (7) | 44 (7) | 46 (8) | 59 (15) | 67 (19) | 74 (23) | 71 (22) | 74 (23) | 75 (24) | 69 (21) | 59 (15) | 52 (11) | 61 (16) |
Source: NOAA

== Demographics ==
Historical population
| Census | Pop. | Note | %± |
|---|---|---|---|
| 1970 | 414 | | — |
| 1980 | 1,020 | | 146.4% |
| 1990 | 1,838 | | 80.2% |
| 2000 | 2,700 | | 46.9% |
| 2010 | 2,757 | | 2.1% |
| 2020 | 3,168 | | 14.9% |
| 2021 (est.) | 3,182 | ▲ | 0.4% |
U.S. Decennial Census

=== 2020 census ===
As of the 2020 census, Nags Head had a population of 3,168. The median age was 54.2 years. 14.1% of residents were under the age of 18 and 28.8% of residents were 65 years of age or older. For every 100 females there were 98.1 males, and for every 100 females age 18 and over there were 97.0 males age 18 and over.

98.0% of residents lived in urban areas, while 2.0% lived in rural areas.

There were 1,409 households in Nags Head, including 861 family households. Of all households, 19.7% had children under the age of 18 living in them, 53.9% were married-couple households, 17.4% were households with a male householder and no spouse or partner present, and 21.6% were households with a female householder and no spouse or partner present. About 26.4% of all households were made up of individuals and 13.3% had someone living alone who was 65 years of age or older.

There were 5,130 housing units, of which 72.5% were vacant. The homeowner vacancy rate was 1.7% and the rental vacancy rate was 25.4%.

Nags Head racial composition
| Race | Number | Percentage |
|---|---|---|
| White (non-Hispanic) | 2,891 | 91.26% |
| Black or African American (non-Hispanic) | 23 | 0.73% |
| Native American | 5 | 0.16% |
| Asian | 25 | 0.79% |
| Other/Mixed | 108 | 3.41% |
| Hispanic or Latino | 116 | 3.66% |

=== 2010 census ===
As of the census of 2010, there were 2,757 people, 1,223 households, and 741 families residing in the town. The population density was 413.2 inhabitants per square mile (159.5/km^{2}). There were 4,884 housing units at an average density of 634.9 per square mile (245.1/km^{2}). The racial makeup of the town was 94.6% White, 1.6% African American, 0.15% Native American, 0.3% Asian, 1.4% from other races, and 1.5% from two or more races. Hispanic or Latino of any race were 1.44% of the population.

There were 1,223 households, out of which 23.1% had children under the age of 18 living with them, 49.2% were married couples living together, 7.2% had a female householder with no husband present, and 39.4% were non-families. 29.0% of all households were made up of individuals, and 8.8% had someone living alone who was 65 years of age or older. The average household size was 2.19 and the average family size was 2.65.

In the town, the population was spread out, with 19.2% under the age of 18, 5.1% from 18 to 24, 30.7% from 25 to 44, 28.0% from 45 to 64, and 17.0% who were 65 years of age or older. The median age was 43 years. For every 100 females, there were 98.1 males. For every 100 females age 18 and over, there were 99.4 males.

The median income for a household in the town was $53,095, and the median income for a family was $61,302. Males had a median income of $33,289 versus $30,139 for females. The per capita income for the town was $30,157. About 4.4% of families and 6.1% of the population were below the poverty line, including 7.9% of those under age 18 and 4.3% of those age 65 or over.

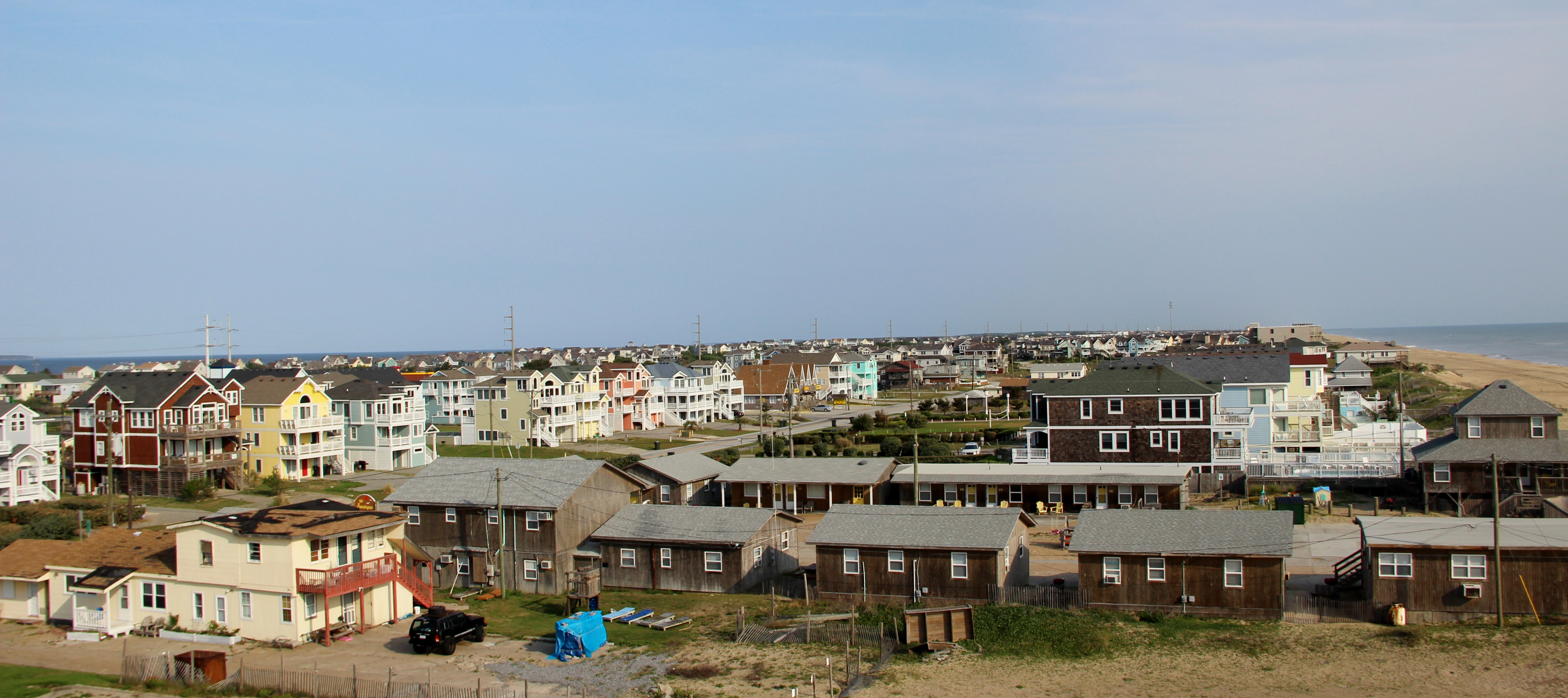
Beach houses along the Atlantic Ocean in Nags Head

== Landmarks and attractions ==
Located in Nags Head is the tallest active sand dune on the East Coast at Jockey's Ridge State Park. The sand dune has migrated over the years from the energy of coastal winds and has buried a miniature golf course along the way. Jockey's Ridge has been popular with hang-gliders since the advent of the sport, and is home to the world's largest hang gliding school. Kite flyers are also frequent visitors. The park's visitor center includes an informative museum with exhibits on sand, weather, and local fauna. The diversity of wildlife may change with seasonal migrations and includes bird species, foxes, mice, squirrels, occasional deer and rabbits.

One of the most exciting features of the Ridge is its unpredictability. Pools may emerge, causing the sand to shift. From the top of the Ridge, the ocean and the sound are visible. Jockey's Ridge has a sound beach on the Roanoke Sound side where visitors may swim.

The Nags Head Woods Ecological Preserve is 1,092 acres (4.42 km^{2}) and lies North of Jockey's Ridge and east of Roanoke Sound. It was designated a National Natural Landmark in 1974.

As in any other beach town, the ocean and shoreline are the major attractions, providing beaches for swimming, sunbathing, and a variety of water sports. A series of historic cottages overlook the beach in sections. There are three piers popular for fishing: Nags Head Pier, Jennette's Pier (severely damaged by Hurricane Isabel in 2003, bought and renovated by the North Carolina Aquariums, reopened in May 2011), and Outer Banks Pier. The town also features miniature golf courses and small amusement centers with go-karts and bumper cars for family entertainment.

Other attractions include various National Register of Historic Places in or near Nags Head, such as the following:

| Landmark name | Image | Date listed | Location | Notes |
|---|---|---|---|---|
| Bodie Island Lifesaving and Coast Guard Station | Bodie Island Lifesaving Station | February 9, 1979 | S of Nags Head on NC 12; 35°50′11″N 75°33′33″W | |
| Bodie Island Light Station | Bodie Island Light | July 4, 2003 | Off NC 12; 35°49′12″N 75°33′49″W | |
| First Colony Inn | First Colony Inn | January 21, 1993 | 6720 S. Virginia Dare Trail; 35°55′6″N 75°36′13″W | |
| Markham-Albertson-Stinson Cottage | Markham-Albertson-Stinson Cottage | January 13, 2006 | 4300 W. Soundside Rd. 35°56′45.51″N 75°37′45.93″W | Destroyed by Hurricane Irene |
| Mattie Midgett Store and House | Mattie Midgett Store and House | December 23, 2004 | 4008 S. Virginia Dare Trail; 35°57′23″N 75°37′28″W | |
| Nags Head Beach Cottages Historic District | Nags Head Beach Cottages Historic District | August 19, 1977 | U.S. 158; 35°57′50″N 75°35′49″W | |
| Sea Foam Motel | | December 23, 2004 | 7111 S. Virginia Dare Trail; 35°54′37″N 75°35′47″W | |
| USS Huron (1875) | | November 15, 1991 | Address restricted | wrecked in the area, 1877 |

== Education ==
Residents are in Dare County Schools. Zoned schools include Nags Head Elementary School, Manteo Middle School, and Manteo High School.

Nags Head Elementary opened in August 2005.

Previously First Flight Elementary School in Kill Devil Hills served elementary levels while First Flight Middle School, also in Kill Devil Hills, served middle school.
