= First Colony Inn =

- U.S. National Register of Historic Places
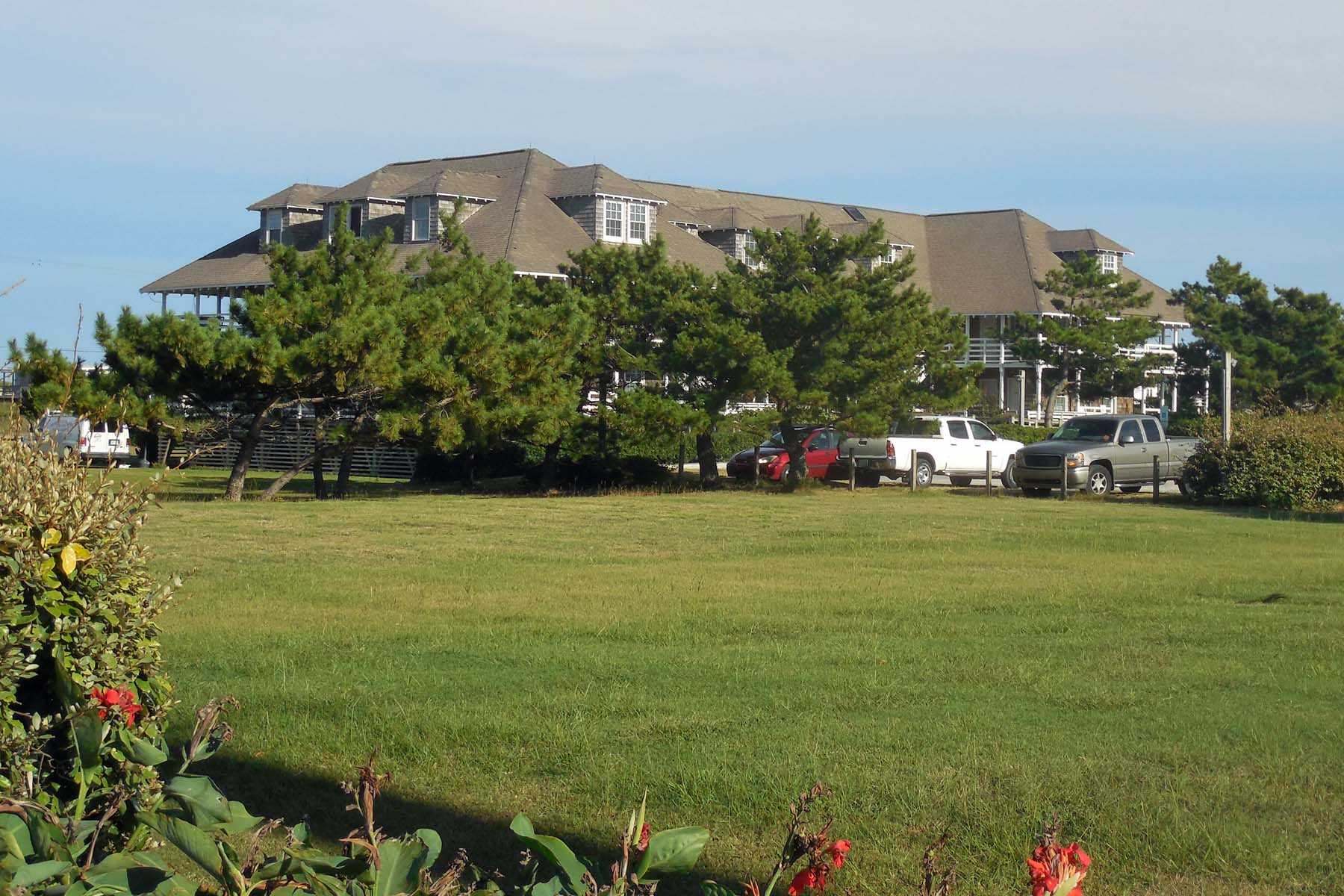

- Location within North Carolina Location within the United States
- Location: 6720 S. Virginia Dare Trail, Nags Head, North Carolina
- Coordinates: 35°55′6″N 75°36′13″W
- Area: 4.4 acres (1.8 ha)
- Built: 1932
- Built by: Frank Benton
- Architect: Willis Leigh
- Architectural style: Vernacular Shingle Style
- NRHP reference No.: 92001835
- Added to NRHP: January 21, 1993

The First Colony Inn, also known as LeRoy's Seaside Inn, First Colony Motor Inn, First Colony Apartments, and Colony Beach Inn, is a historic hotel building located at Nags Head, Dare County, North Carolina. It was designed by Willis Leigh and built by Frank Benton It first opened in 1932 as LeRoy's Seaside Inn, by Henry LeRoy of Elizabeth City, North Carolina. The inn is a 2 1/2-story, balloon-frame building in the vernacular Shingle Style. The building is divided into three equal sections (approximately 25 feet by 60 feet each) separated by open breezeways and arranged in an H-shaped configuration. Surrounding the building is a two-story engaged verandah.

It was listed on the National Register of Historic Places in 1993.
