= Rononia =

British steam trawler

History

United Kingdom
- Name: Rononia
- Owner: Kottingham Trawling Co Ltd (C.G. Mastin), Grimsby
- Port of registry: Grimsby (1913–19); Fleetwood (1919–24); Grimsby (1924–42)
- Builder: Cook, Welton & Gemmell Ltd, Beverley
- Yard number: 271
- Launched: 24 April 1913
- Completed: June 1913
- In service: 1913–1942
- Fate: Sunk on 6 March 1942.

General characteristics
- Tonnage: 213 GRT; 89 NRT
- Length: 117.1 ft (35.7 m)
- Beam: 21.5 ft (6.6 m)
- Depth: 12.1 ft (3.7 m)
- Propulsion: 430 ihp (320 kW) T3-cyl and boiler by C.D. Holmes & Co Ltd, Hull
- Crew: 11

Rononia was a steam fishing trawler that operated for almost 30 years. Completed in 1913, she went through several owners before being requisitioned as a war trawler during the First World War. The ship survived the war and again was sold multiple times before being bought by her final owner, Kottingham Trawling Co Ltd. On 6 March 1942, Rononia was torpedoed by the German submarine U-701 whilst sailing to Iceland. The trawler immediately broke up with the loss of all hands.

== Construction and design ==
Rononia was constructed by Cook, Welton & Gemmell Ltd in Beverley, Yorkshire for her original owner, Pelham Steam Fishing Co Ltd of Grimsby. Launched on 24 April 1913 at yard 271, the trawler had a gross register tonnage (GRT) of 213 and a net register tonnage (NRT) of 89. The ship's dimensions included a length of 117.1 ft (35.7 m), a breadth of 21.5 ft (6.6 m), and a depth of 12.1 ft (3.7 m). Her engine was a 430 indicated horsepower (320 kW) T3-cylinder by C.D. Holmes & Co Ltd of Hull.

== History ==
Rononia was auctioned and sold to Walter Olney of Fleetwood several months after her completion. Two years later, the trawler was requisition by the Royal Navy to serve in the First World War, after which she was sold to The Neva Steam Trawlers Ltd. After the war, Rononia returned to Fleetwood and was owned by Neva Steam Trawlers for five years, being bought by Harold Bacon of Grimsby in 1924. After her owner died in 1929, the steamship was sold to Kottingham Trawling Co Ltd, which operated the ship until her sinking.

=== Sinking ===
On 6 March 1942, Rononia embarked on a trip to fishing grounds off Iceland. About 200 miles (320 km) off Iceland, the ship was hit by a G7e torpedo from U-701. The U-boat had followed the trawler for twelve hours, believing that the latter was an anti-submarine trawler. Rononia broke up in two explosions with all on board killed.
