= Bodie Island Lifesaving and Coast Guard Station =

Historic district in North Carolina, United States

- Bodie Island Lifesaving/Coast Guard Station
- U.S. National Register of Historic Places
- U.S. Historic district
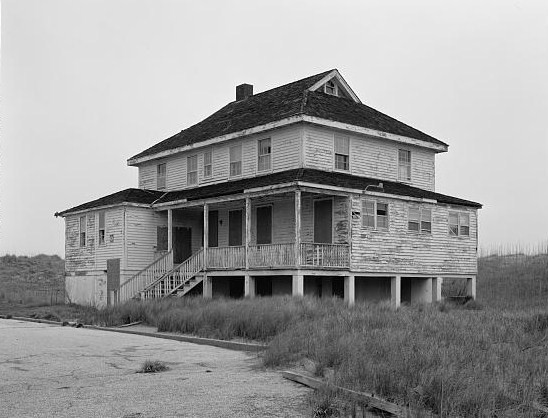
- Bodie Island Lifesaving Station in 2000

- Location within North Carolina Location within the United States
- Nearest city: Nags Head, North Carolina
- Coordinates: 35°50′11″N 75°33′33″W
- Built: 1878
- Architect: Allen A. McCullough
- NRHP reference No.: 79000251
- Added to NRHP: February 9, 1979

The Bodie Island Lifesaving Station, also known as the Bodie Island Coast Guard Station, is located on the Outer Banks of North Carolina at the southern end of Bodie Island, within Cape Hatteras National Seashore. The 10-acre (4.0 ha) district includes a residence, the lifesaving station, the Coast Guard station, and an observation tower, as well as many utility buildings. The facility was turned over to the National Park Service in 1953, with the establishment of the national seashore. The primary structure, the lifesaving station, was built in 1878 and was converted to a residence when the Coast Guard station was built in 1925. It was moved to its present location in 1955, as it was threatened by shoreline erosion. The Coast Guard station was altered the same year to provide housing and office space for the National Park Service.

== See also ==
- Bodie Island Light
