= Nags Head Beach Cottages Historic District =

Historic district in North Carolina, United States

- U.S. National Register of Historic Places
- U.S. Historic district
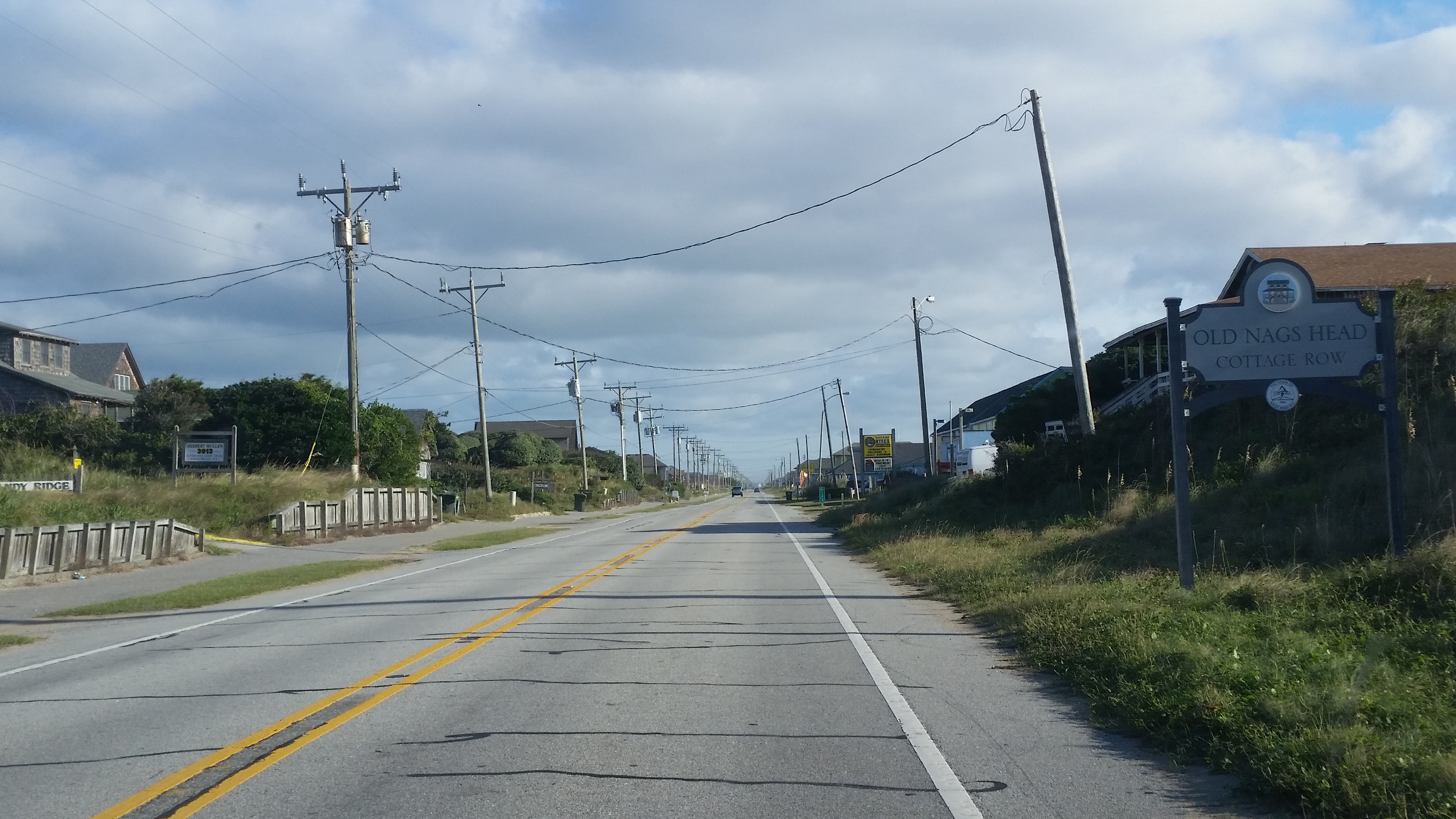

- Location within North Carolina Location within the United States
- Location: U.S. 158, Nags Head, North Carolina
- Coordinates: 35°57′38″N 75°37′33″W
- Area: 2,083 acres (843 ha)
- Architect: Twine, Samuel J.
- Architectural style: Late Gothic Revival, Queen Anne
- NRHP reference No.: 77000997
- Added to NRHP: August 19, 1977

Nags Head Beach Cottages Historic District, also known as the Nags Head Beach Cottage Row Historic District, is a national historic district located at Nags Head, Dare County, North Carolina. The district encompasses 41 contributing buildings dating from the late-19th and early-20th century. The district is characterized by a string of frame wood-shingled cottages and includes notable examples of Late Gothic Revival and Queen Anne style architecture.

It was listed on the National Register of Historic Places in 1977.
