= Sea Foam Motel =

Historic hotel in North Carolina, US

- U.S. National Register of Historic Places
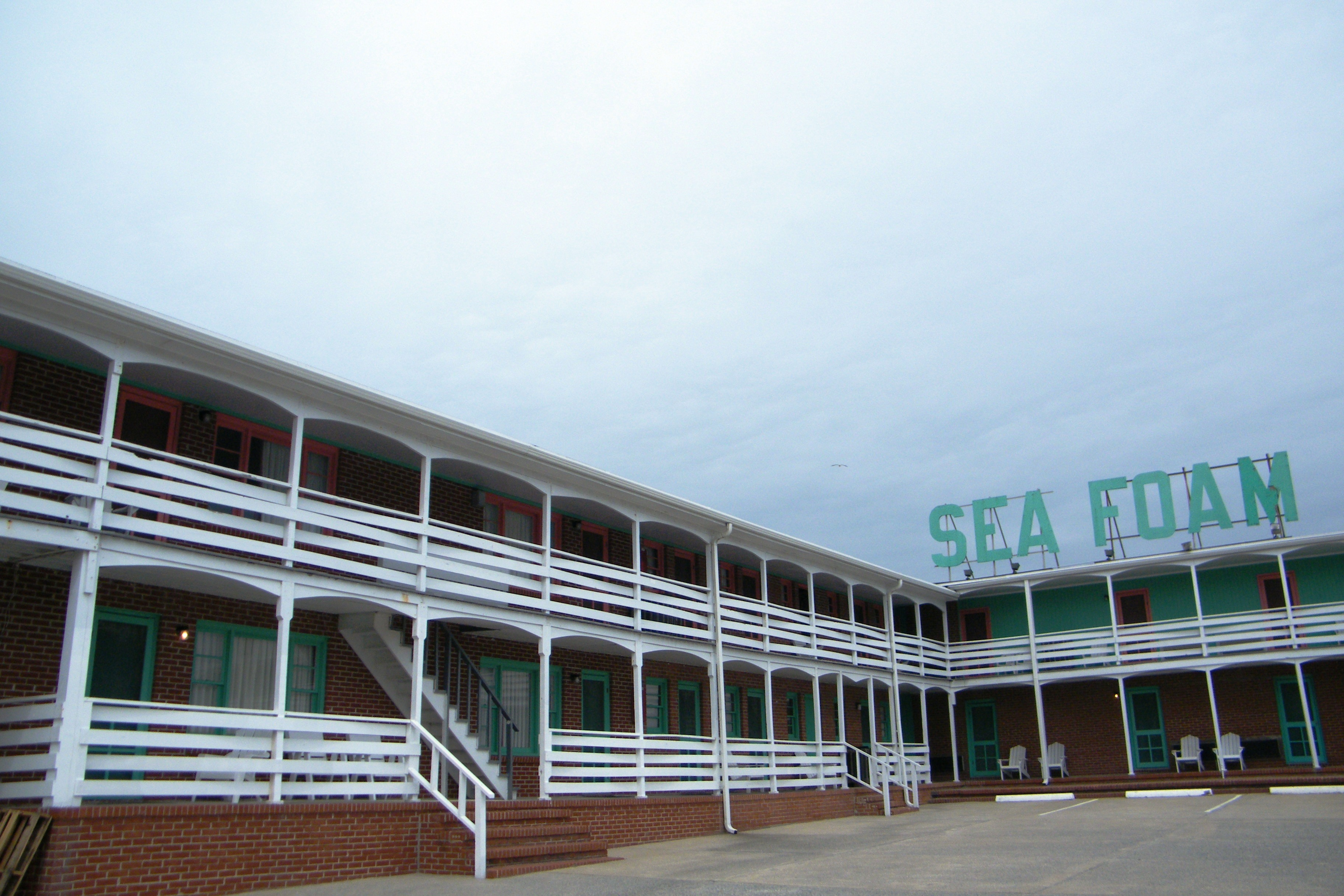
- Sea Foam Motel, March 2011

- Location within North Carolina Location within the United States
- Location: 7111 S. Virginia Dare Trail, Nags Head, North Carolina
- Coordinates: 35°54′37″N 75°35′47″W
- Area: 1.8 acres (0.73 ha)
- Built: 1948
- Architectural style: Modern Movement
- NRHP reference No.: 04001392
- Added to NRHP: December 23, 2004

Sea Foam Motel is a historic motel located at Nags Head, Dare County, North Carolina. It was built in 1948 with additions made through 1964, and is a one- to two-story, Modern-style brick building. It consists of three major sections that form a "U"-shape enclosing a large parking area on three sides. Also on the property are the contributing swimming pool (1948), playground (c. 1950), and shuffle board court (c. 1950).

It was listed on the National Register of Historic Places in 2004.
