= Horst Degen =

German U-boat commander (1913–1996)

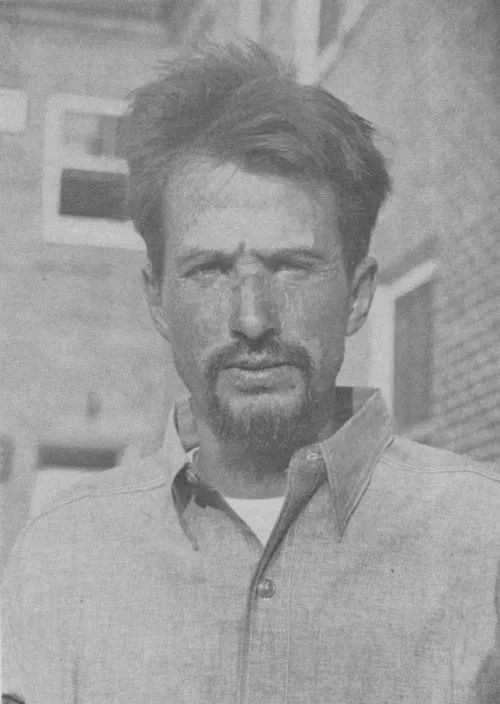
- Photograph of Kapitänleutnant Degen in July 1942 shortly after the capture of German submarine U-701
- Born: 19 July 1913; Münster, German Empire
- Died: 29 January 1996 (aged 82); Lüneburg, Germany
- Military career
- Allegiance: Nazi Germany
- Branch: Kriegsmarine
- Service years: 1933–1942
- Rank: Kapitänleutnant
- Units: 7th U-boat Flotilla; 3rd U-boat Flotilla
- Commands: U-701
- Awards: Iron Cross 2nd Class (1939); Destroyer War Badge (1940); U-boat War Badge (1942); Iron Cross 1st Class (1942)

Horst Degen (19 July 1913 – 29 January 1996) was a German U-boat commander during World War II. Under Degen's command, the submarine U-701 was credited with sinking five Allied ships totaling 25,390 gross register tons (GRT) and damaged four others for 37,093 GRT. U-107 also sank four auxiliary warships and damaged a destroyer.

== Early life ==
Horst Degen was born on 19 July 1913 in Münster in the German Empire. According to Degen's interrogation report via the United States Department of the Navy, he was a bachelor and orphan with two married sisters, before the war he lived in Hamburg.

== Military service ==
=== Prewar years ===
Degen was an Offiziersanwärter (officer candidate) with the class of 1933 graduating on 1 April 1933. From September 1939 to June 1940, Degen served aboard German destroyer Z10 Hans Lody, a Type 1934A-class destroyer. Degen was promoted to the rank of Fähnrich zur See (equivalent to petty officer first class) on 1 July 1934 and later promoted to Oberfähnrich zur See (Senior chief petty officer) on 1 April 1936. On 1 October 1936, Degen was promoted to the rank of Leutnant zur See (Lieutenant) and Oberleutnant zur See (Premier Lieutenant) on 1 June 1938. While aboard the Hans Lody, Degen was the Second Watch Officer (2WO), torpedo, and radio technician before being transferred to serve in the U-boat force.

=== Wartime service ===
From June to December 1940, Degen was trained in U-boat warfare, later undergoing U-boat commander training from January to March 1941. Courses and training for U-boat commanders typically lasted several months to several years dependent on several factors including both rank and age. U-boat ace Reinhard "Teddy" Suhren for example was barred from further U-boat training despite being a recipient of the Knight's Cross of the Iron Cross due to the fact that he was not 25 years old.

Degen briefly served aboard German submarine U-552 during his training period as part of the ships second patrol as an Oberleutnant zur See under the famous Erich Topp from 7 April to 6 May 1941. Degen was eventually promoted to the rank of Kapitänleutnant on 1 March 1941 and from 16 July 1941 until 7 July 1942 commanded German submarine U-701, a Type VIIC submarine which was attached to the 3rd U-boat Flotilla which was headquartered in Kiel and La Pallice.

=== Capture ===
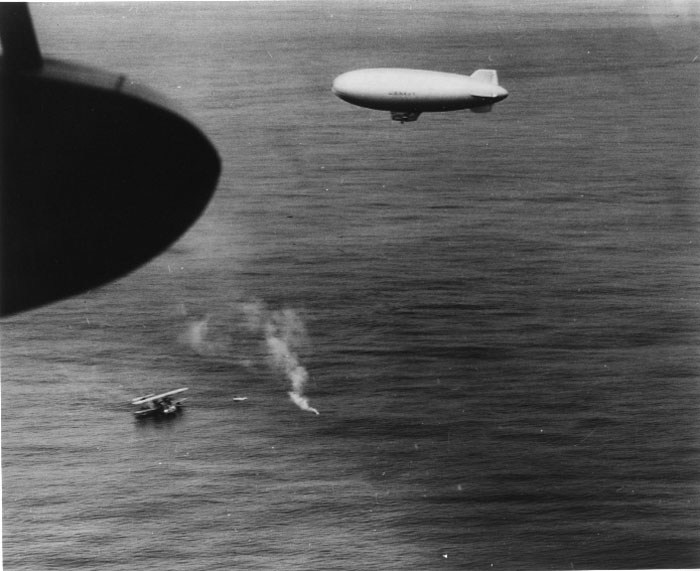
Survivors are rescued from U-701 on July 7, 1942

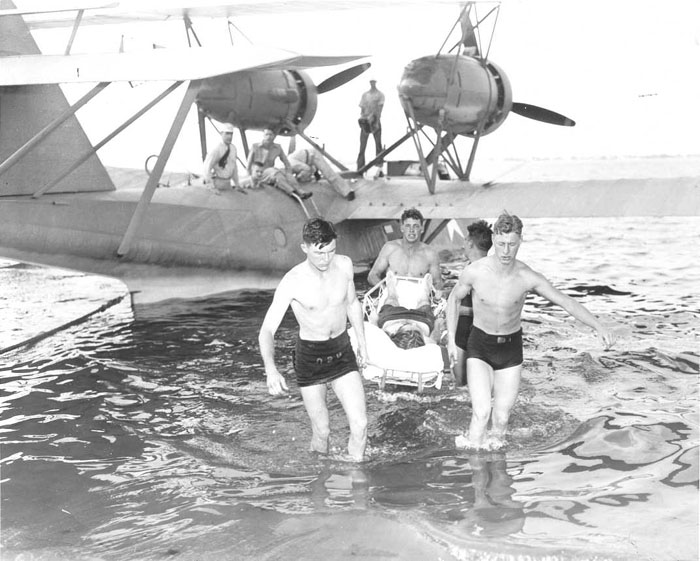
Rescue of U-701 survivors

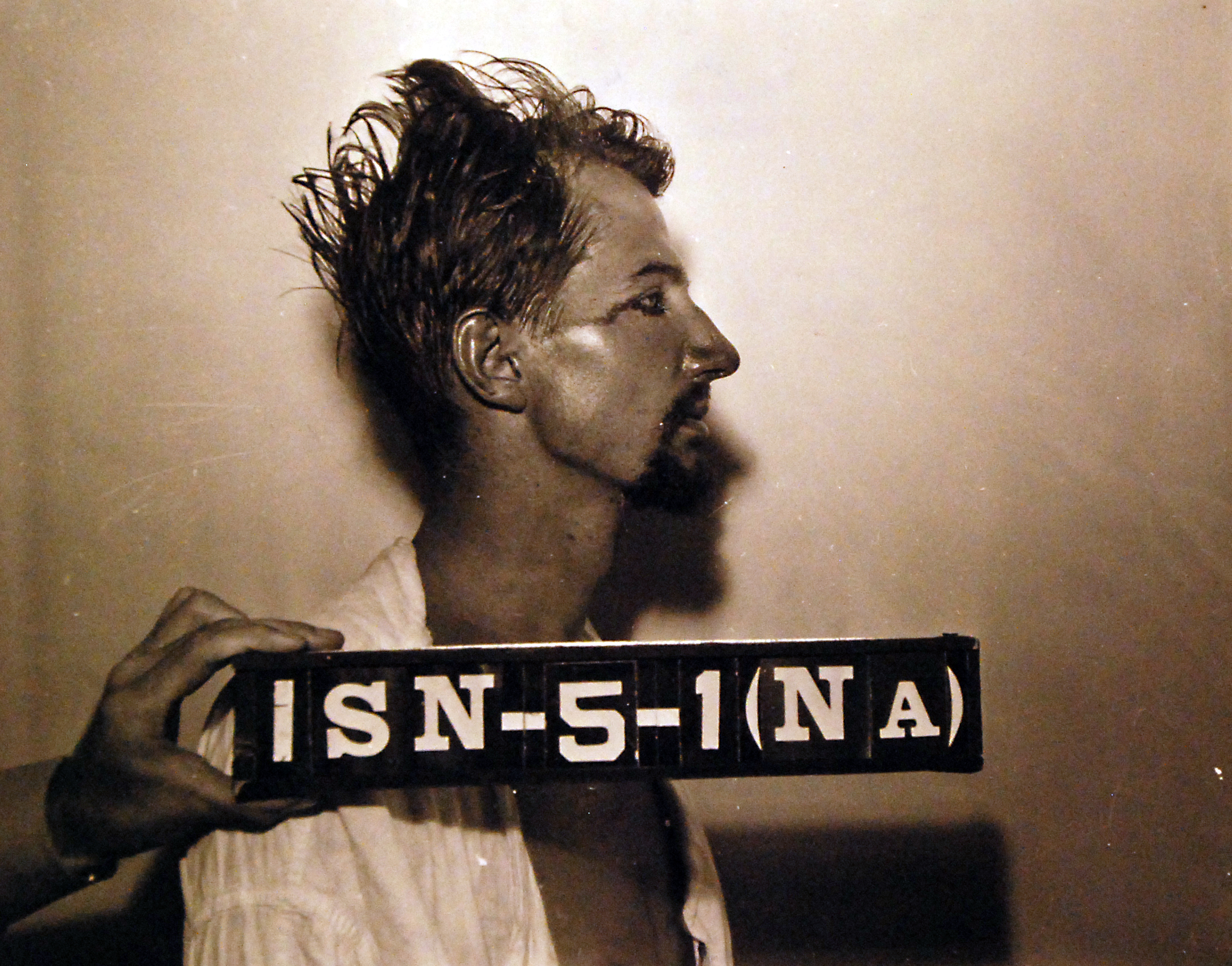
A bruised and oil covered Degen after being saved by United States Navy personnel after the sinking of U-701

In early 1942, Degen was ordered to block the mouth of the Chesapeake Bay near two of the largest naval stations on the east coast, Naval Air Station Patuxent River and Naval Air Station Oceana while German submarine U-373 would mine the entrance to Delaware Bay and German submarine U-87 would mine the harbor channel outside of Boston in Massachusetts Bay.

Twenty three days after leaving Lorient in late May 1942, U-701 crossed the Continental shelf on 12 June 1942. The mine laying mission was successful, however while returning to Lorient on 7 July 1942 U-701 was sunk by 3 depth charges from an American Lockheed Hudson off the coast of Cape Hatteras. Only Degen, along with 6 men of his crew were rescued from the sinking ship, there were no other survivors. Degen was eventually interrogated as a prisoner of war but was eventually paroled at the end of the war in June 1946.

== Later life ==
Degen died on 29 January 1996 in Lüneburg.
