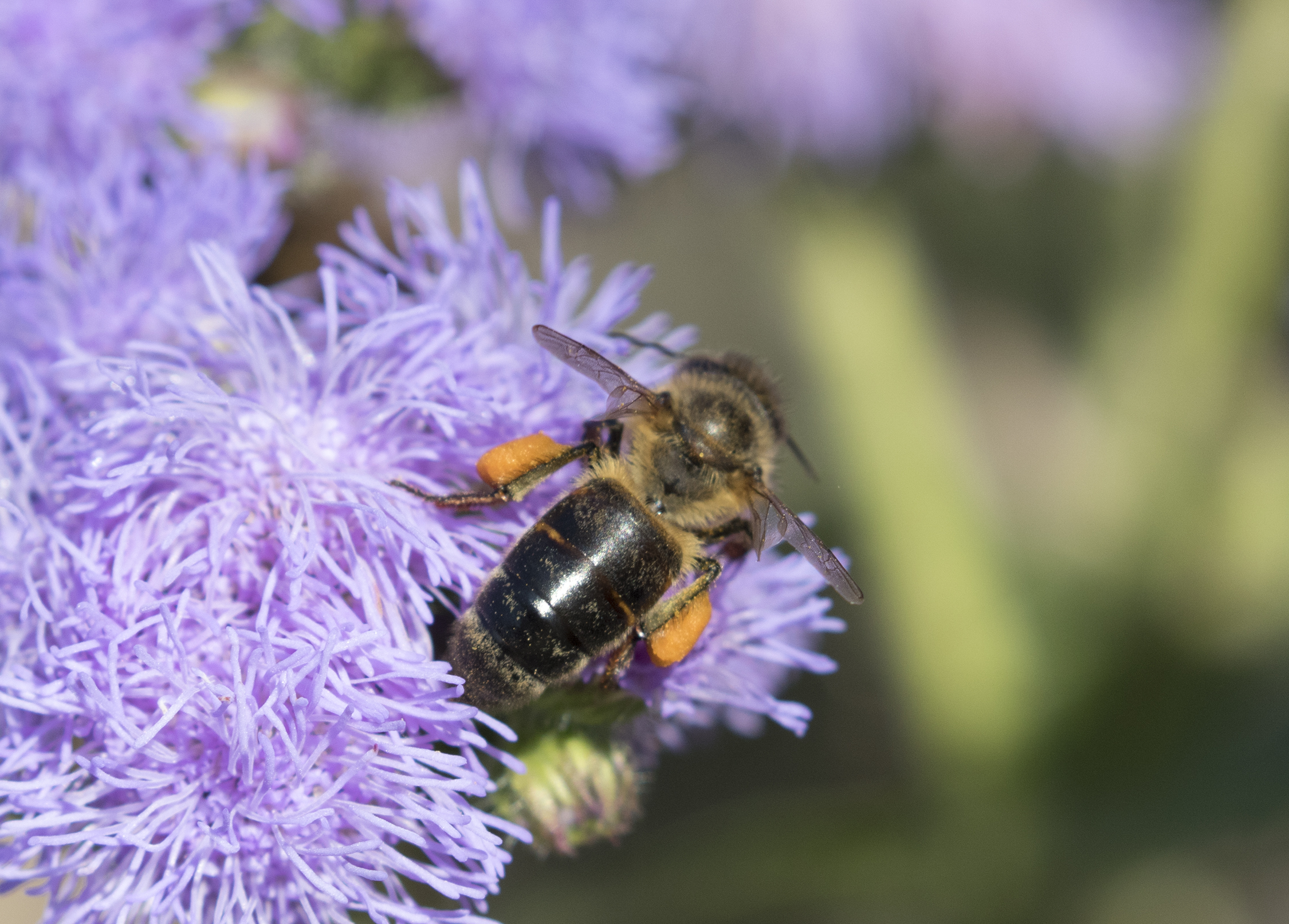

Scientific classification
- Kingdom: Animalia
- Phylum: Arthropoda
- Class: Insecta
- Order: Hymenoptera
- Family: Apidae
- Genus: Apis
- Species: A. mellifera
- Subspecies: A. m. caucasia

Trinomial name
- Apis mellifera caucasia Pollmann, 1889

Synonyms
- Apis mellifera caucasica Gorbachev, 1916

= Caucasian honey bee =

Subspecies of western honey bee

The Caucasian honey bee (Apis mellifera caucasia) is a subspecies of the western honey bee.

== Origin ==
The Caucasian honey bee originates from the high valleys of the Central Caucasus. Georgia is the “central homeland” for the subspecies, although the bees also can be found in eastern Turkey, Armenia and Azerbaijan.

== Anatomy and appearance ==
- Shape and size: similar to A. m. carnica
- Chitin color: dark with brown spots at times
- Hair color: lead-grey
- Tongue length: up to 7.3 mm

== Behavior ==
=== Beneficial for beekeeping ===
- Gentle and calm on the comb
- Longest proboscis, so it can extract nectar from the deepest nectar tissues, where no other honey bees can
- Ardent brood production – raising strong colonies
- Colonies reach full strength in mid-summer, which is good for areas where the highest nectar flow is in mid-summer
- Very great user of propolis

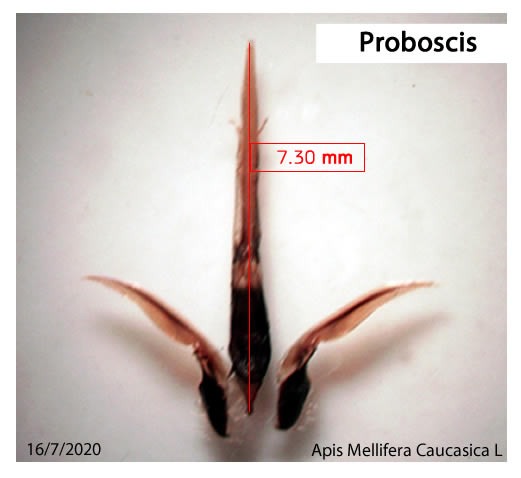
Caucasian bee (Apis mellifera caucasia) proboscis; length is about 7.3 mm

=== Not beneficial for beekeeping ===
- Colonies do not reach full strength until mid-summer, which is an undesirable trait for areas with the highest nectar flow in the spring.
- The great use of propolis may be seen as undesirable as it makes hive management more difficult. Frames and hive boxes are glued together more substantially.
- Overwintering in northern climates is not good due to susceptibility to nosema.
- Inclined to drifting and robbing

In Turkey, beekeepers purposefully bring hives of Apis mellifera caucasia to areas of dense Rhododendron ponticum blooms to purposefully sequester grayanotoxin laden honey called "mad honey." This coveted novelty honey is referred to as "deli bal" and is neurotoxic. These bees are also less susceptible than A. m. mellifera to acute exposure to Imidacloprid, a neurotoxic pesticide.

== Worldwide distribution ==
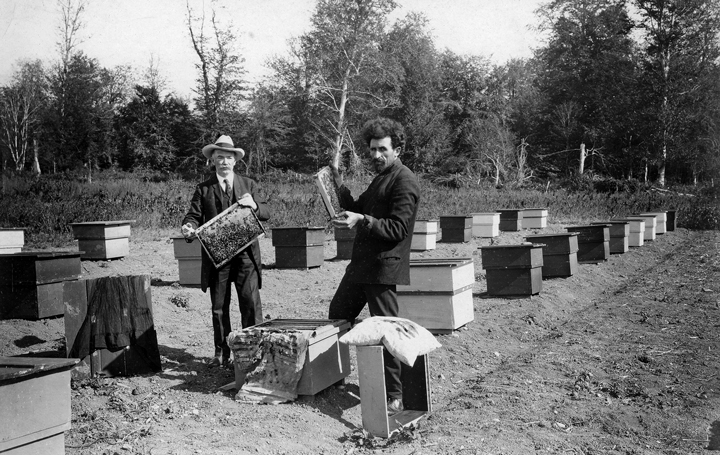
Frank Benton and Georgian entomologist Ilarion Kavtaradze, circa 1905, Georgia, Caucasus

The Caucasian (Georgian) honeybee has a long history of importance to beekeeping worldwide. The bees were first introduced in the United States in the 19th century. The Caucasian honey bee was a subspecies that came to have enduring interest to U.S. beekeepers. Frank Benton (1852–1919) visited Georgia in 1905 and supported the import of honeybees to the United States.

The Russian revolution and consequent annexation of Georgia by the Red Army in 1921 halted the export of Caucasian honey bees. Subspecies were studied and cultivated primarily by Soviet entomologists. Soviet officials were concerned about preserving the purity of the Caucasian subspecies and outlawed any export without special permission.

In 1932 professor E. F. Phillips was invited to the Soviet Union, Republic of Georgia and spent a month visiting various beekeeping and bee research establishments. E. F. Phillips paid special attention to the unique characteristics of the Apis Mellifera Caucasia (Caucasian honey bee) species - great tongue (proboscis) length and docility and was impressed with the beekeeping potential in Georgia.

International exports were continued from 1969. According to a UK newspaper "GOLDEN BEE the grey mountain bee of the Soviet Union has been judged the best in the world and awarded a gold medal. The grey Caucasian bee is distinguished for its industry and it collects honey, even when it is raining. Many foreign beemasters have requested for the Golden bee and as many as 200,000 have been sent to Europe, Asia and America this year." (Sunday Mirror June 1, 1969)

== International awards ==
The Caucasian honey bee received three gold medals at the international events – at the International Exhibition of Gardening in Erfurt (Germany) in 1961; at the 20th APIMONDIA International Congress in Bucharest (Romania) in 1965; and at the 23rd APIMONDIA International Congress in Moscow in 1971.

== Sources ==
The Hive and the Honeybee Chapter 11 "Races of bees" by Prof. Friedrich Ruttner, published by Dadant, 1975
