= Mattie Midgett Store and House =

Historic building in North Carolina, United States

- U.S. National Register of Historic Places
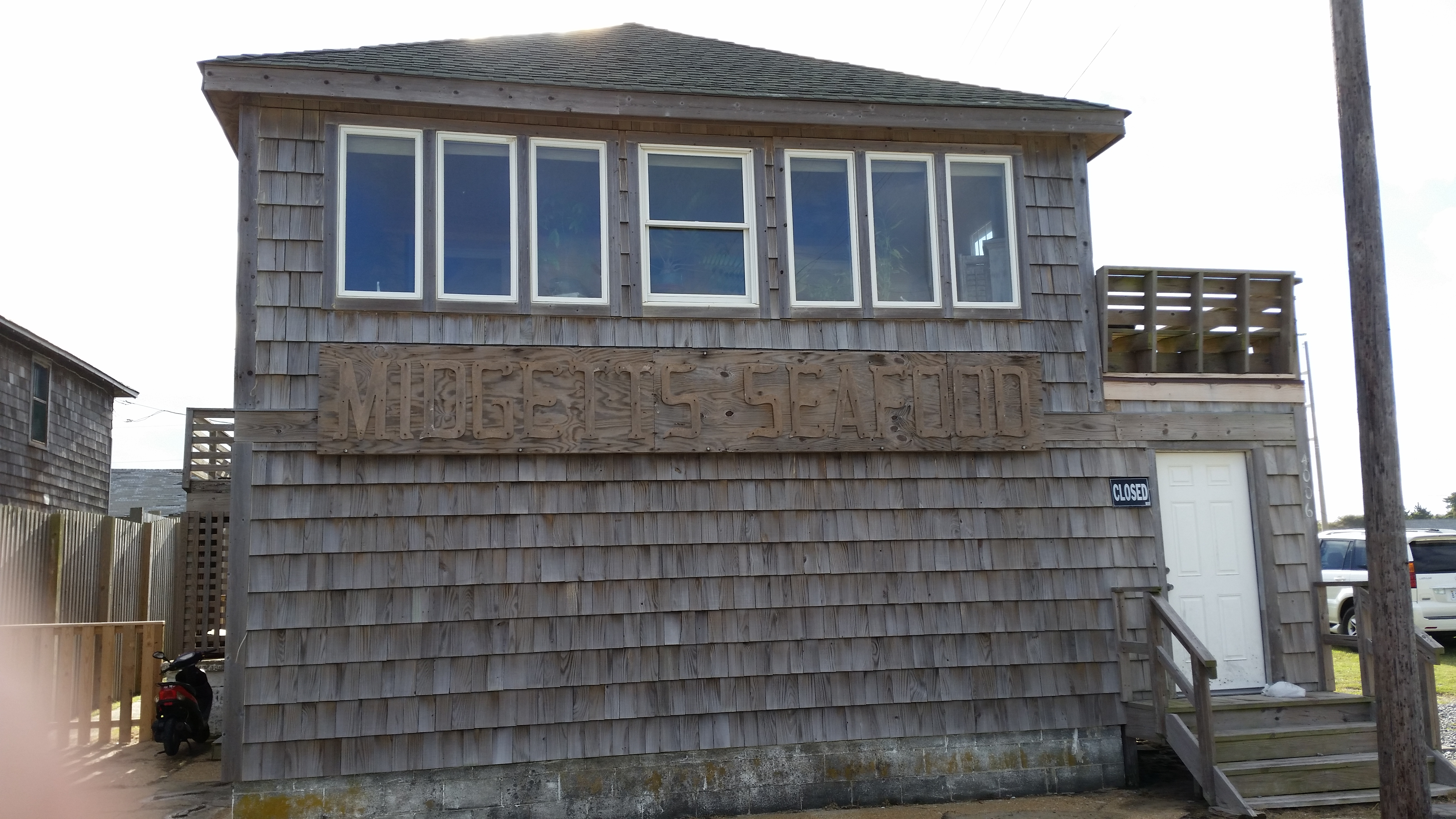

- Location within North Carolina Location within the United States
- Location: 4008 S. Virginia Dare Trail, Nags Head, North Carolina
- Coordinates: 35°57′23″N 75°37′28″W
- Area: less than one acre
- Built: 1914, 1933, 1944
- Architectural style: Outer Banks Shingle
- NRHP reference No.: 04001389
- Added to NRHP: December 23, 2004

Mattie Midgett Store and House, also known as Nellie Myrtle Pridgen's Beachcomber Museum, is a historic home and general store located at Nags Head, Dare County, North Carolina. The store was built in 1914, and the house in 1933. The store is a two-story frame Outer Banks Shingle Style building with a hipped shingle roof. A one-story, hipped-roof, one-room addition was built in 1944. The store was moved to its present site in 1932. The house is a two-story, T -shaped, single-pile frame dwelling with steeply pitched gable roofs.

The store houses the Outer Banks Beachcomber Museum, which features a collection of beach glass, feathers, shells, sand, bricks and bottles found on area beaches.

It was listed on the National Register of Historic Places in 2004.
