= Markham-Albertson-Stinson Cottage =

Historic house in North Carolina, United States

- U.S. National Register of Historic Places
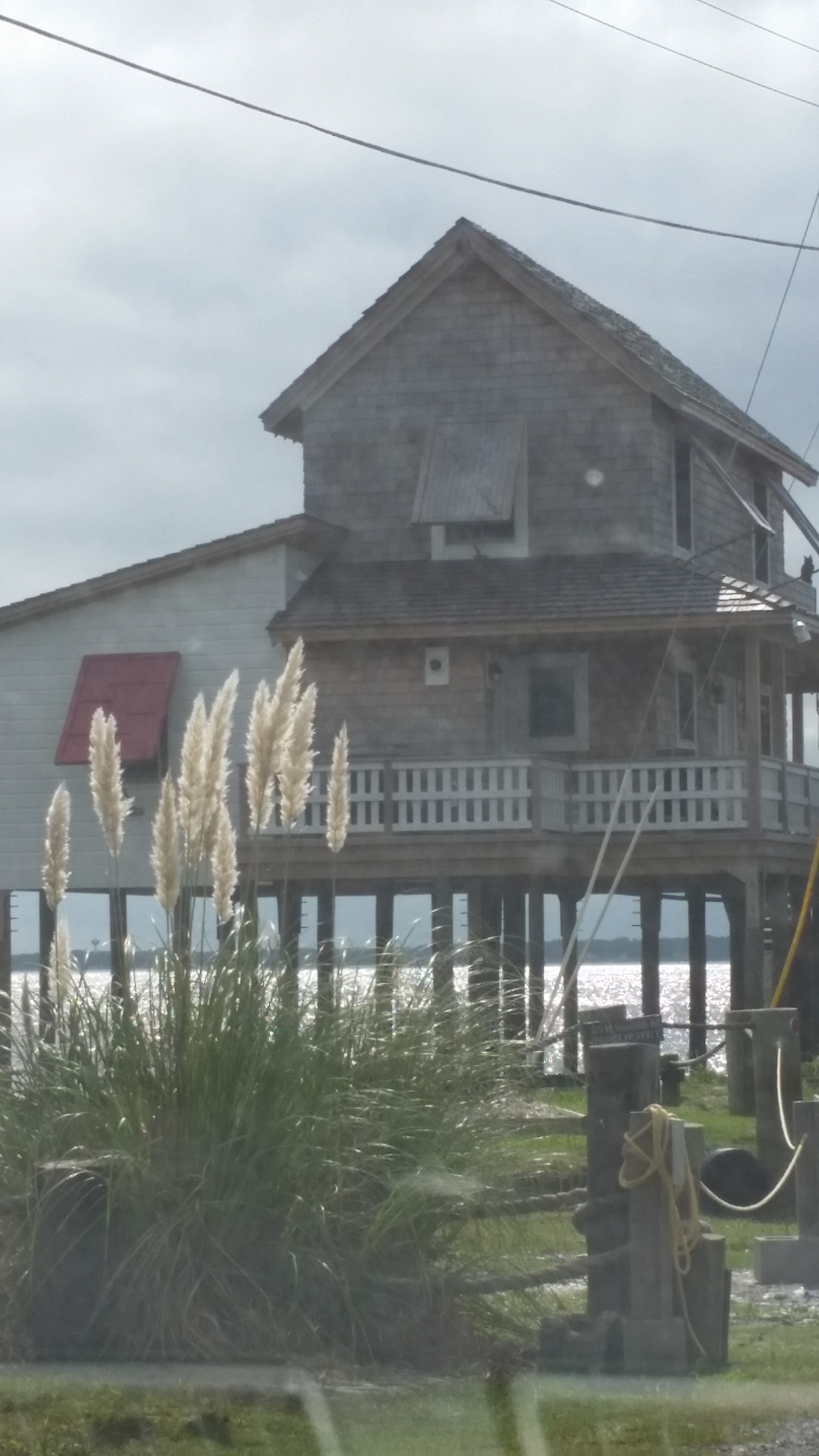
- Rebuilt structure

- Location within North Carolina Location within the United States
- Location: 4300 W. Soundside Rd., Nags Head, North Carolina
- Coordinates: 35°56′45″N 81°37′46″W
- Area: less than one acre
- Built: c. 1916
- Architectural style: Outer Banks cottage
- NRHP reference No.: 05001544
- Added to NRHP: January 13, 2006

Markham-Albertson-Stinson Cottage, also known as Stinson's Ranch, was a historic home located at Nags Head, Dare County, North Carolina. It was built about 1916, and was a 1 1/2-story, frame, Outer Banks cottage on pilings above the water. It had a wide porch on three sides. It was destroyed by Hurricane Irene in 2011. It was listed on the National Register of Historic Places in 2006.
