= Frank Benton =

American beekeeping innovator (1852–1919)

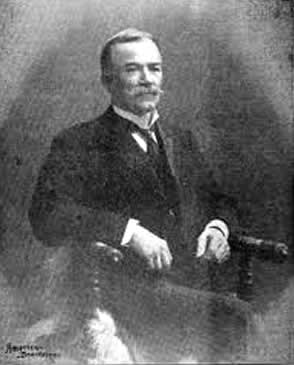
- Born: 1852
- Died: 1919 (aged 66–67)
- Occupations: Entrepreneur, inventor, author
- Known for: Beekeeping innovations; Benton cage
- Notable work: Bee-Keeping, The Honey Bee (1896)

Frank Benton (July 5, 1852 – February 28, 1919) was an American entomologist, researcher, beekeeping innovator and author.

Benton was born in Coldwater, Michigan, and obtained his B.Sc. and M.Sc. from Michigan State Agricultural College. He later studied at the University of Tennessee, the Ludwig-Maximilians-Universität München, and the University of Athens. He was a member of various organizations: Bureau of Entomology in the United States Department of Agriculture, Entomological Society of Washington, North American Beekeepers Association, National Geographic Society and the American Association for the Advancement of Science. He is also known for invention of special mailing cage for shipping queen bees (Benton Cage). Benton is the author of two books, Bee-Keeping and The Honey Bee (1896).

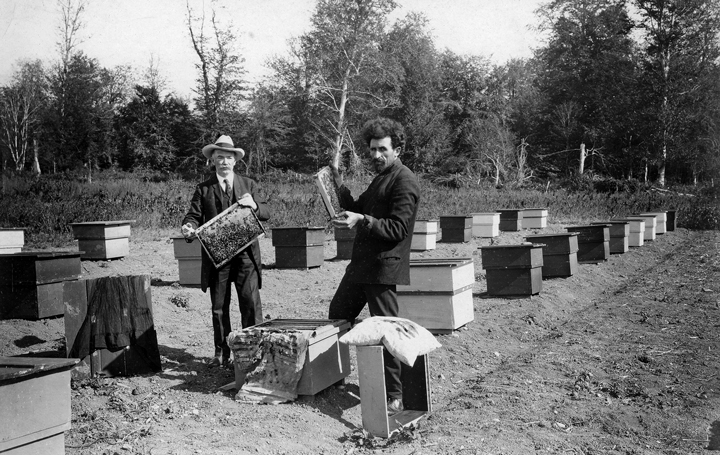
Frank Benton in Georgia, Caucasus, circa 1905

Benton traveled to Palestine "to investigate the bee industry, and as a result of his efforts there is now in this country a particular strain of bees known as Holy Land bees, which are scattered widely over the United States" (27 January 1914 issue of the M.A.C. record, page 5).

Benton visited Georgia, Caucasus in 1905. He greatly supported the import of Caucasian (Georgian) Apis mellifera caucasia honey bees to the United States.

During his research of big bees (Apis dorsata) in India he contracted "jungle fever". Benton died at Fort Myers, February 28, 1919.
