= German submarine U-701 =

German World War II submarine

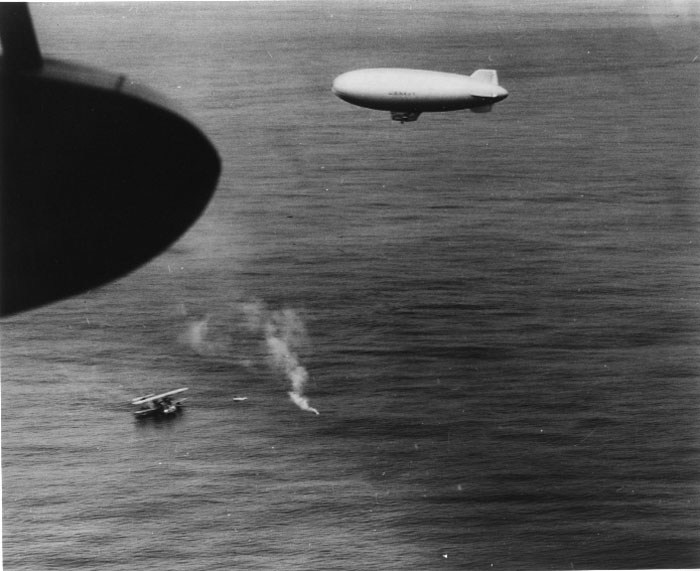
- Survivors are rescued from U-701.

History

Nazi Germany
- Name: U-701
- Ordered: 9 October 1939
- Builder: HC Stülcken & Sohn, Hamburg
- Yard number: 760
- Laid down: 3 May 1940
- Launched: 16 April 1941
- Commissioned: 16 July 1941
- Fate: Sunk by a USAAF Hudson on 7 July 1942 about 22 miles off Cape Hatteras. Seven survivors including the Captain were taken as prisoners of war.

General characteristics
- Class & type: Type VIIC submarine
- Displacement: 769 tonnes (757 long tons) surfaced; 871 t (857 long tons) submerged
- Length: 67.10 m (220 ft 2 in) o/a; 50.50 m (165 ft 8 in) pressure hull
- Beam: 6.20 m (20 ft 4 in) o/a; 4.70 m (15 ft 5 in) pressure hull
- Height: 9.60 m (31 ft 6 in)
- Draught: 4.74 m (15 ft 7 in)
- Installed power: 2,800–3,200 PS (2,100–2,400 kW; 2,800–3,200 bhp) (diesels); 750 PS (550 kW; 740 shp) (electric)
- Propulsion: 2 shafts; 2 × diesel engines; 2 × electric motors
- Speed: 17.7 knots (32.8 km/h; 20.4 mph) surfaced; 7.6 knots (14.1 km/h; 8.7 mph) submerged
- Range: 8,500 nmi (15,700 km; 9,800 mi) at 10 knots (19 km/h; 12 mph) surfaced; 80 nmi (150 km; 92 mi) at 4 knots (7.4 km/h; 4.6 mph) submerged
- Test depth: 230 m (750 ft); Crush depth: 250–295 m (820–968 ft)
- Complement: 4 officers, 40–56 enlisted
- Armament: 5 × 53.3 cm (21 in) torpedo tubes (four bow, one stern); 14 × torpedoes or 26 TMA mines; 1 × 8.8 cm (3.46 in) deck gun (220 rounds); 1 × 2 cm (0.79 in) C/30 AA gun

Service record
- Identification codes: M 44 322
- Commanders: Kptlt. Horst Degen; 16 July 1941 – 7 July 1942
- Operations: 3 patrols: 1st patrol: 27 December 1941 – 9 February 1942; 2nd patrol: a. 26 February – 1 April 1942 b. 19 – 20 May 1942; 3rd patrol: 20 May – 7 July 1942
- Victories: 5 merchant ships sunk (25,390 GRT); 4 auxiliary warships sunk (1,666 GRT); 4 merchant ships damaged (37,093 GRT); 1 warship damaged (1,190 tons)
- U-701 (submarine) shipwreck and remains
- U.S. National Register of Historic Places
- Nearest city: Buxton, North Carolina
- MPS: World War II Shipwrecks along the East Coast and Gulf of Mexico MPS
- NRHP reference No.: 15000806
- Added to NRHP: 12 November 2015

German submarine U-701 was a Type VIIC U-boat built for the Nazi Germany's Kriegsmarine that served in the North Atlantic during World War II. It was launched on 16 April 1941 under the command of Kapitänleutnant Horst Degen, with a crew of 43.

In three operational patrols U-701 sank five ships, of 25,390 gross register tons (GRT) and damaged four others for 37,093 GRT. She also sank four auxiliary warships and damaged a destroyer.

She was sunk in an air attack on 7 July 1942 and rests at a depth of 115 feet (35 m) at 35°14.330′N 75°06.690′W.

== Fate ==
U-701 was sunk on 7 July 1942 off Cape Hatteras. While running on the surface U-701 was attacked by a Hudson of 396 Sqdn USAAF. She was hit by two bombs and sunk. 17 of her crew were able to escape, but were adrift for two days before being found and rescued by the US Coast Guard. By that time just 7 men had survived.

== Final resting place ==
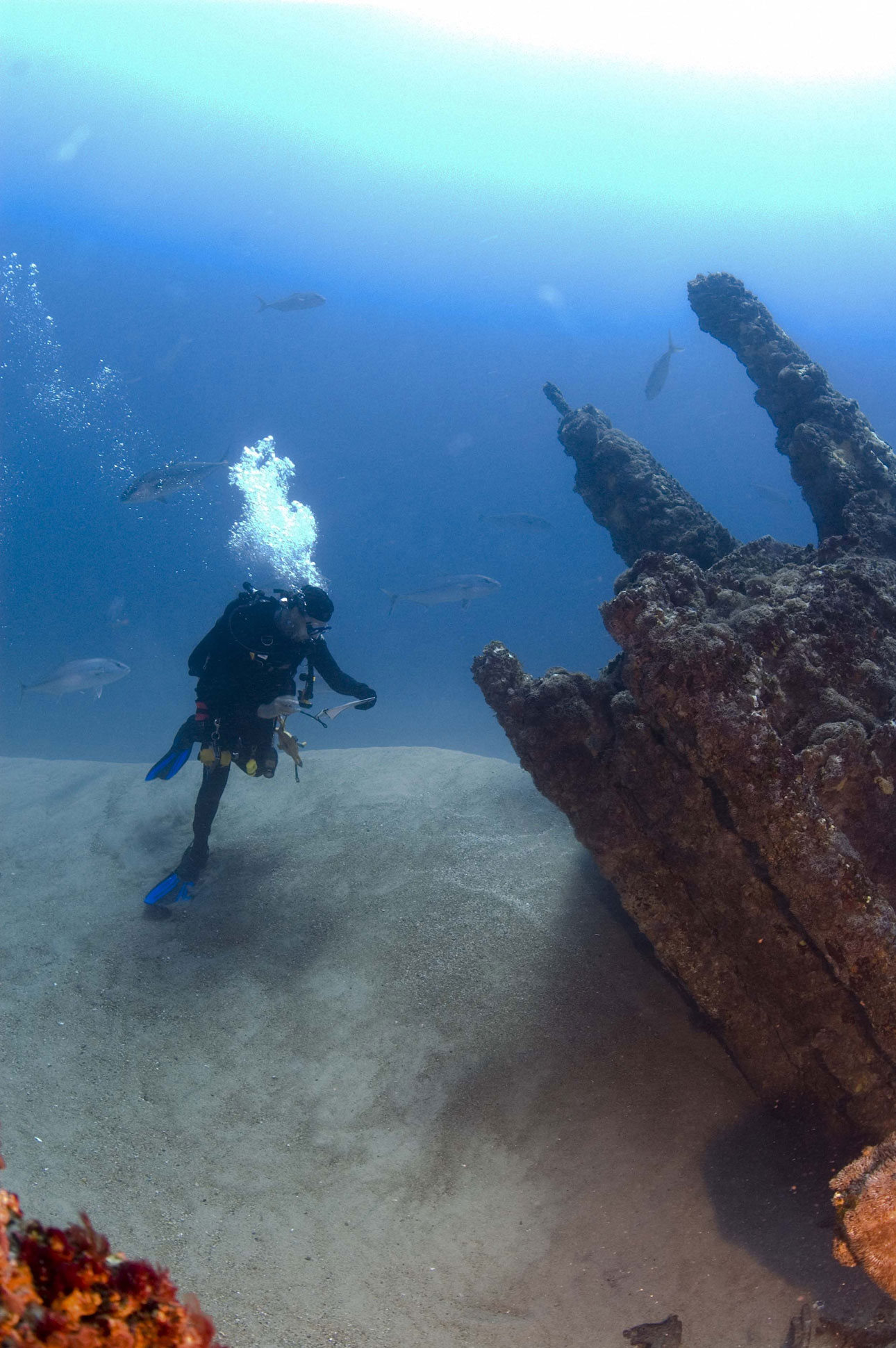
Diving on the wreck of the U-701 in 2008.

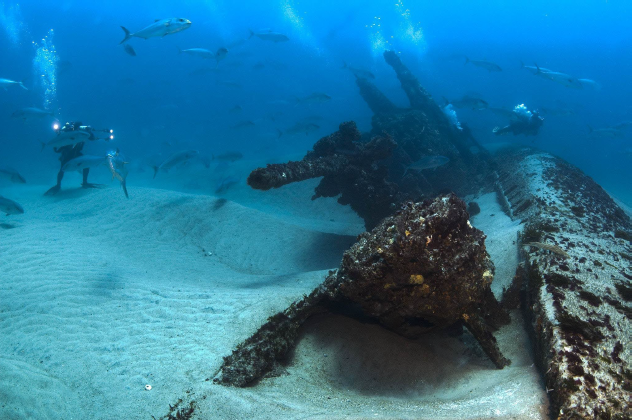
Divers investigate the wreck of U-701.

At 115 feet (35 m) below the surface, U-701 is still intact, retaining its 8.8 cm (3.5 in) deck gun. Majority of the debris lies within 100 metres (330 ft) radius of the wreck. This wreck has become an artificial reef that is heavily populated with Seriola dumerili.

The wreck of the U-701 was originally discovered by Uwe Lovas in the coastal waters off Cape Hatteras in 1989. The location of the wreck and the site remained a secret and therefore undisturbed for 15 years. The U-701 is an intact wreck site within recreational diving depths on the East Coast of the United States.

Recently, the vessel's location has been rediscovered and the coordinates have become accessible to the general public, who have already begun diving the site. An overwhelming majority of the local recreational and wreck diving community is deeply concerned about the potential for disturbance, damage and loss resulting from unauthorized salvage. The site was listed on the National Register of Historic Places in 2015.

A dive to the wreck in 2011 was documented in the National Geographic TV documentary, Hitler's Secret Attack on America (2013).

=== Wolfpacks ===
U-701 took part in three wolfpacks, namely:

- Zieten (6 – 22 January 1942)
- Westwall (2 – 12 March 1942)
- York (12 – 26 March 1942)

== Summary of raiding history ==
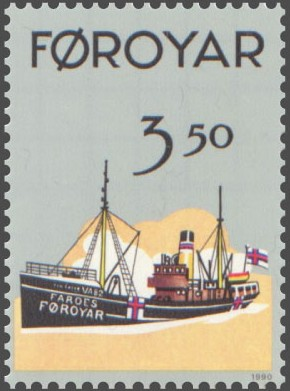
Faroe postage stamp showing the trawler Nýggjaberg, which was sunk by U-701 on 28 March 1942

Date	Ship name	Nationality	Tonnage (Note: Merchant ship tonnages are in gross register tons. Military vessels are listed by tons displacement.)	Fate
6 January 1942	Baron Erskine	United Kingdom	3,657	Sunk
6 March 1942	Rononia	United Kingdom	213	Sunk
7 March 1942	Nyggjaberg	Faeroes	349	Sunk
9 March 1942	HMS Notts County	Royal Navy	541	Sunk
11 March 1942	HMS Stella Capella	Royal Navy	507	Sunk
15 June 1942	HMS Kingston Ceylonite	Royal Navy	448	Sunk (mine)
15 June 1942	USS Bainbridge	United States Navy	1,190	Damaged (mine)
15 June 1942	Robert C. Tuttle	United States	11,615	Damaged (mine)
15 June 1942	Esso Augusta	United States	11,237	Damaged (mine)
17 June 1942	Santore	United States	7,117	Sunk (mine)
19 June 1942	USS YP-389	United States Navy	170	Sunk
26 June 1942	Tamesis	Norway	7,256	Damaged
27 June 1942	British Freedom	United Kingdom	6,985	Damaged
28 June 1942	William Rockefeller	United States	14,054	Sunk
		Sunk: Damaged: Total:	27,056; 38,283; 65,339	

== See also ==
- Lists of shipwrecks

== Bibliography ==
- Busch, Rainer; Röll, Hans-Joachim (1999). German U-boat commanders of World War II: a biographical dictionary. Translated by Brooks, Geoffrey. London, Annapolis, Md: Greenhill Books, Naval Institute Press. ISBN 1-55750-186-6.
- Busch, Rainer; Röll, Hans-Joachim (1999). Der U-Boot-Krieg, 1939-1945: Deutsche U-Boot-Verluste von September 1939 bis Mai 1945 [German U-boat losses from September 1939 to May 1945] (in German). Vol. IV. Hamburg, Berlin, Bonn: Mittler. ISBN 3-8132-0514-2.
- Gröner, Eric; Jung, Dieter; Maass, Martin (1991). German Warships 1815-1945: U-boats and Mine Warfare Vessels. Vol. 2. Translated by Thomas, Keith; Magowan, Rachel. London: Conway Maritime Press. ISBN 0-85177-593-4.
