= Bodie Island Lighthouse =

Lighthouse in North Carolina, United States

Bodie Island Light
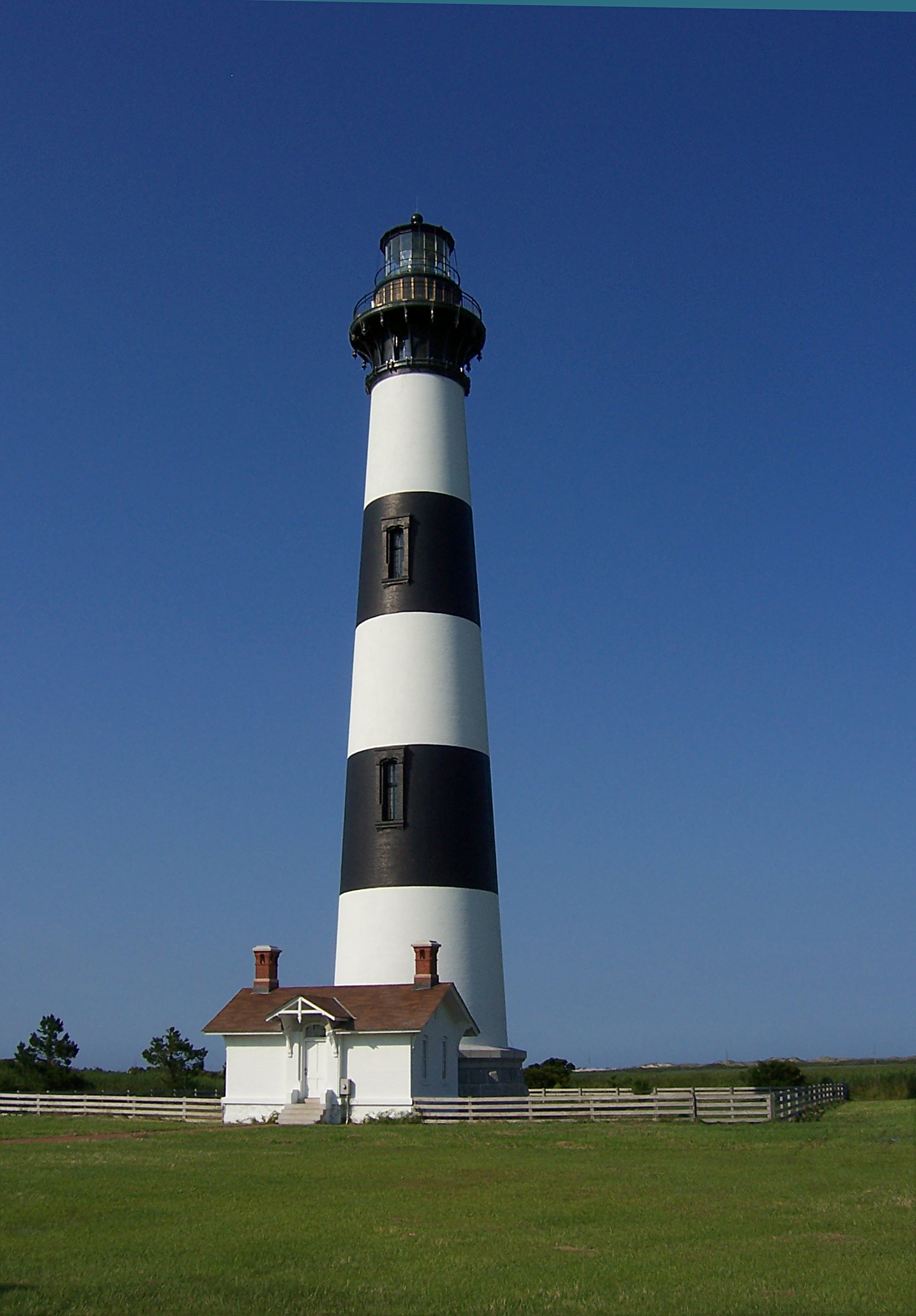
- Bodie Island Lighthouse
- Location: 4 miles (6 km) north of Oregon Inlet, Near North Nags Head, North Carolina
- Coordinates: 35.8185°N 75.5633°W

Tower
- Constructed: 1847 (First); 1859 (Second); 1872 (Current)
- Foundation: Timber, Granite, Rubble
- Construction: Brick, Cast Iron, Stone
- Automated: 1940
- Height: 164.4 feet (50.1 m)
- Shape: Conical
- Markings: White and black bands with black lantern house
- Heritage: National Register of Historic Places contributing property

Light
- First lit: 1872
- Focal height: 50 m (160 ft)
- Lens: First order Fresnel lens (current)
- Range: 19 nautical miles (35 km; 22 mi)
- Characteristic: White 2.5 seconds on, 2.5 seconds off, 2.5 seconds on, and 22.5 seconds eclipse with 2 cycles each minute
- Bodie Island Light Station
- U.S. National Register of Historic Places
- U.S. Historic district
- Area: 15 acres (6.1 ha)
- Architectural style: Italianate, First-order brick lighthouse
- NRHP reference No.: 03000607
- Added to NRHP: July 4, 2003

The current Bodie Island Lighthouse (pronounced “bah-dee island”) is the third that has stood in this vicinity of Bodie Island on the Outer Banks in North Carolina and was built in 1872. It stands 156 feet (48 m) tall and is located on the Roanoke Sound side of a portion of a peninsula that is the first part of the Cape Hatteras National Seashore. The lighthouse is just south of Nags Head, a few miles before Oregon Inlet. It was renovated from August 2009 to March 2013, and was made climbable by the public. There are 219 steps that spiral to the top. The 170-foot structure is one of only a dozen remaining tall, brick tower lighthouses in the United States — and one of the few with an original first-order Fresnel lens to cast its light.

== History ==
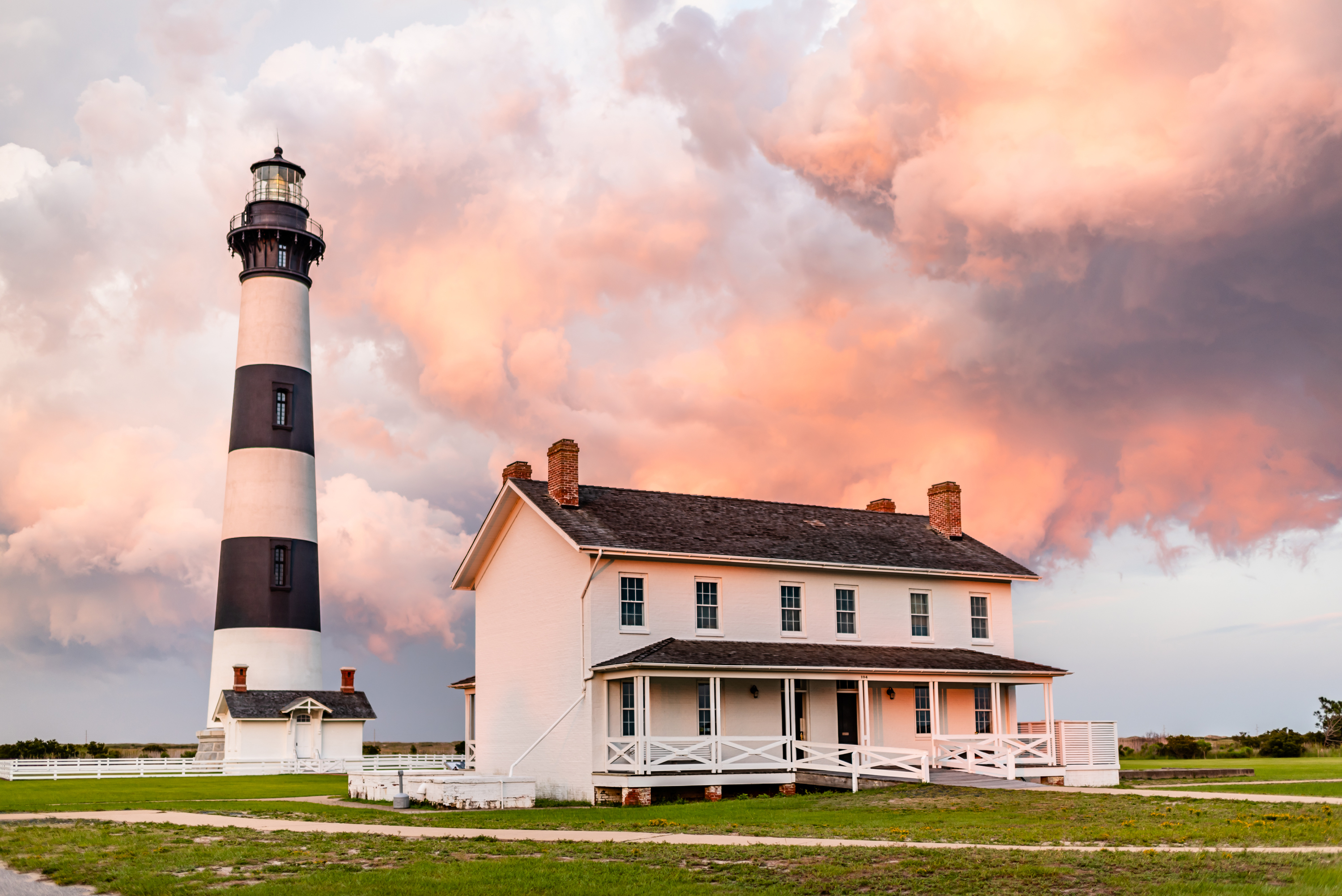
Bodie Island Lighthouse and keeper's quarters

The preceding Bodie Island lighthouses actually stood south of Oregon Inlet on Pea Island in an area that is now under water due to the southward migration of the inlet. The first was built in 1847 and then abandoned in 1859 due to a poor foundation. The second, built in 1859, was destroyed in 1861 by retreating Confederate troops who feared it would be used as a Union observation post during the Civil War. The third and current lighthouse, with its original first order Fresnel lens, was completed in 1872. This lighthouse was built further North and further inland on a 15-acre site. In 1932, the Bodie Island Lighthouse became automated (and the light was upgraded to an electric lamp by using oil-fueled electrical generators), and by 1953 it had been transferred into the care of the National Park Service. It remained staffed until 1940, when the lighthouse was fully automated. In 1953, the generators were disconnected and power was supplied from the commercial electric grid.

While some people (including North Carolinians not from the Outer Banks) pronounce the name with a long "o" sound, it is traditionally pronounced as body. Folklore would have you believe it is due to the number of dead sailors washed ashore from wrecked ships along this portion of the East Coast, which has long been known as the "Graveyard of the Atlantic" but that is not true. The name is actually derived from the original name of the area, which was "Bodie's Island" after the Body family who once owned the land that was a separate barrier island prior to 1811 when Roanoke inlet that separated it from the Currituck Banks to the north closed. Local gift shops sell maps of the shipwrecks on the ocean floor. Many ships have been sunk due to storms, shoals, and German U-boats during World War I and World War II. This lighthouse appears in the background of the 1963–1964 Federal Duck Stamp.

After years of raising funds and postponement, work to restore the cast iron and other parts in need of work began on the lighthouse in August 2009. As of March 2010, the outside scaffolding was 100% complete while interior scaffolding was 50% completed. The restoration was stopped in spring 2011 after significant new structural integrity issues were found in many of the main support beams under the balcony. The additional repairs needed were too costly to finish in the original restoration project. In August 2011, Hurricane Irene blew out some of the newly restored lantern room glass and tore away a protective shroud covering the lantern room. Flooding caused buckling of the floors in the Bodie Island Light Station Double Keepers Quarters. Additional funding was obtained to continue the restoration, which was restarted in 2012 and completed in March 2013. There was a re-lighting ceremony on April 18, 2013, and the lighthouse was opened for the general public to climb the following day for a fee.

== Timeline ==
Historic light station information – North Carolina

Bodie Island Lighthouse:

- 1837 - The United States Congress appropriates funds to be used towards the construction of Bodie Island Lighthouse on the coast of North Carolina.
- 1847 – The contractor on the first project was Mr. Francis Gibbons, of Baltimore, who would later become a prominent lighthouse builder on the West Coast. The cost was $5,000 but problems with the location and design of the tower caused a ten-year delay in construction. The tower was highly unstable and soon after it was completed, it began to lean toward the sea.
- 1859 – The Bodie Island Lighthouse had deteriorated and the Lighthouse Board secured a $25,000 appropriation from Congress to erect a new tower. This new tower was 80 ft (24 m). and its lantern was a third-order Fresnel lens.
- 1861 – In the fall of 1861, Confederate troops stacked explosives inside the tower and blew it apart.
- 1871 – A third lighthouse was completed in 1871 partially with material left over from the construction of a new tower at Cape Hatteras. The tower was 156 ft (48 m). with a first-order Fresnel lens that made its light visible for 18 nautical miles (33 km). The Bodie tower is painted with white and black horizontal bands.
- 1939 - The United States Coast Guard assumes control of Bodie Island Lighthouse.
- 2000 - Bodie Island Lighthouse is officially transferred to the care of the US National Park Service.

— United States Coast Guard

== Gallery ==
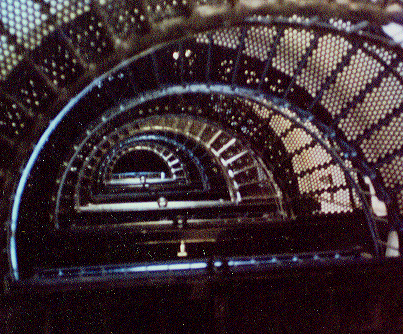
The interior of the lighthouse consists largely of a massive spiral staircase.

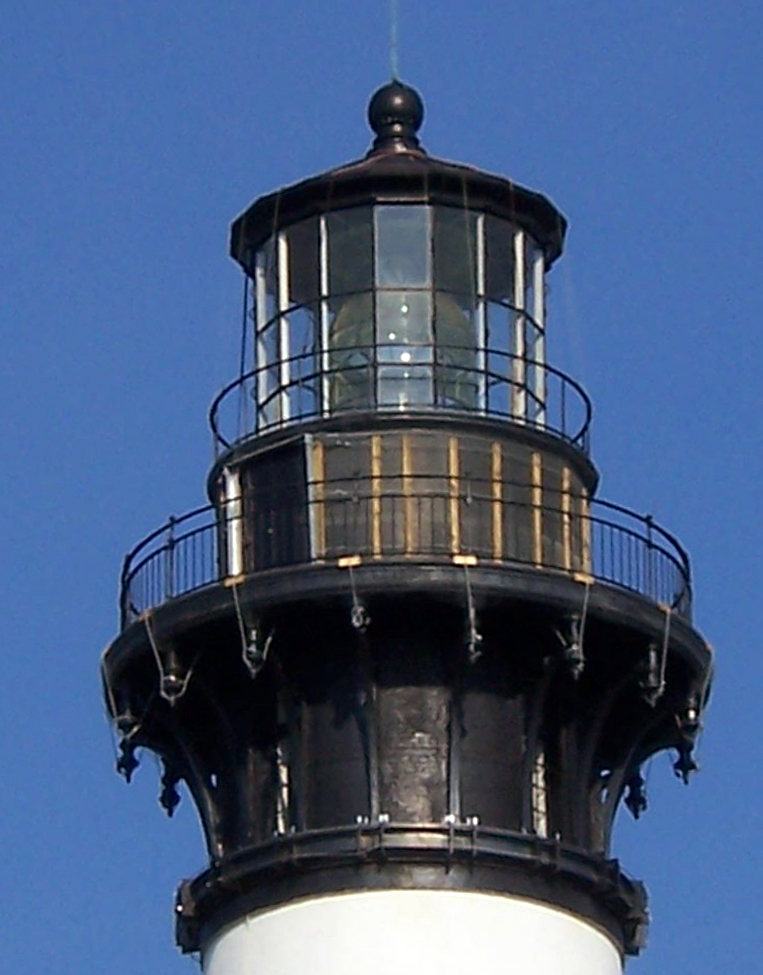
The watch room deck and lantern of the Bodie Island Lighthouse

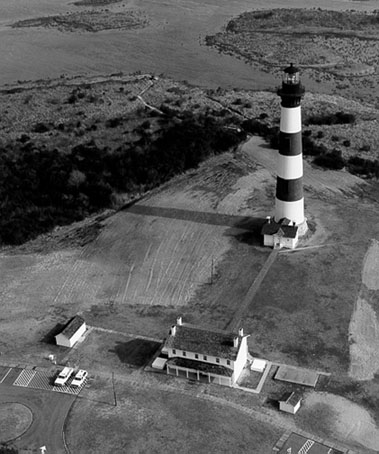
Bodie Island Lighthouse, USCG archive photo

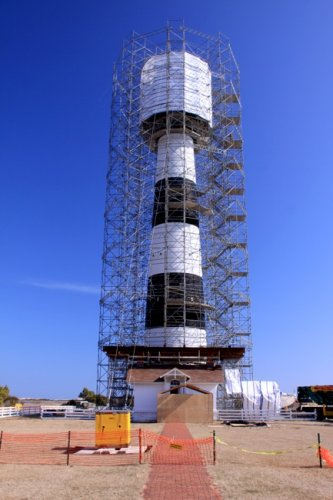
Bodie Island Light restoration work in March 2010

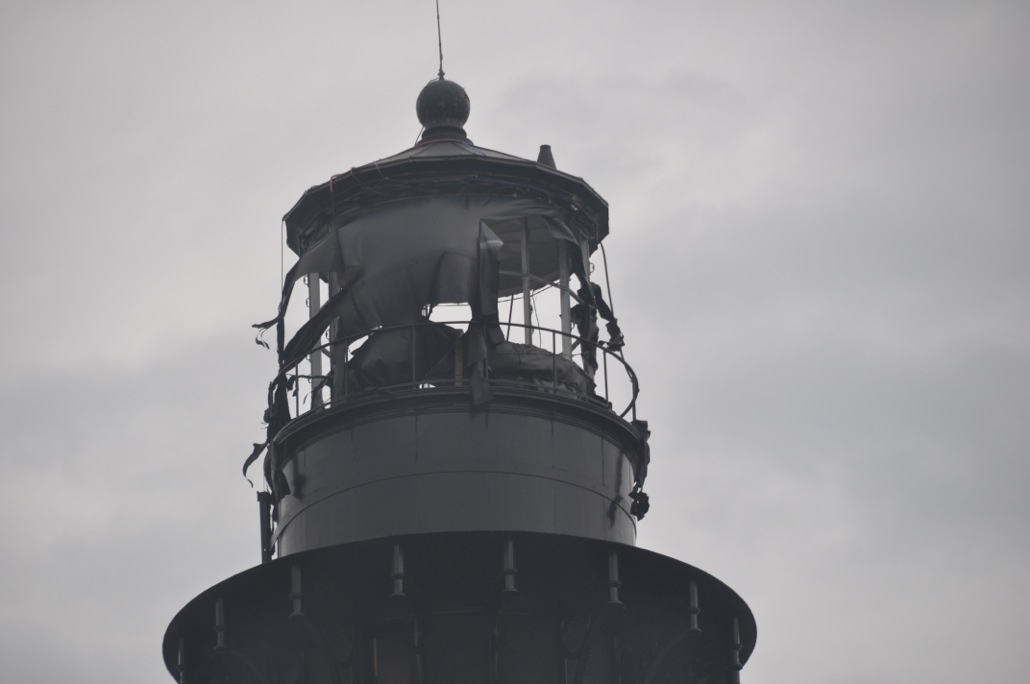
Damage to watch room glass from Hurricane Irene

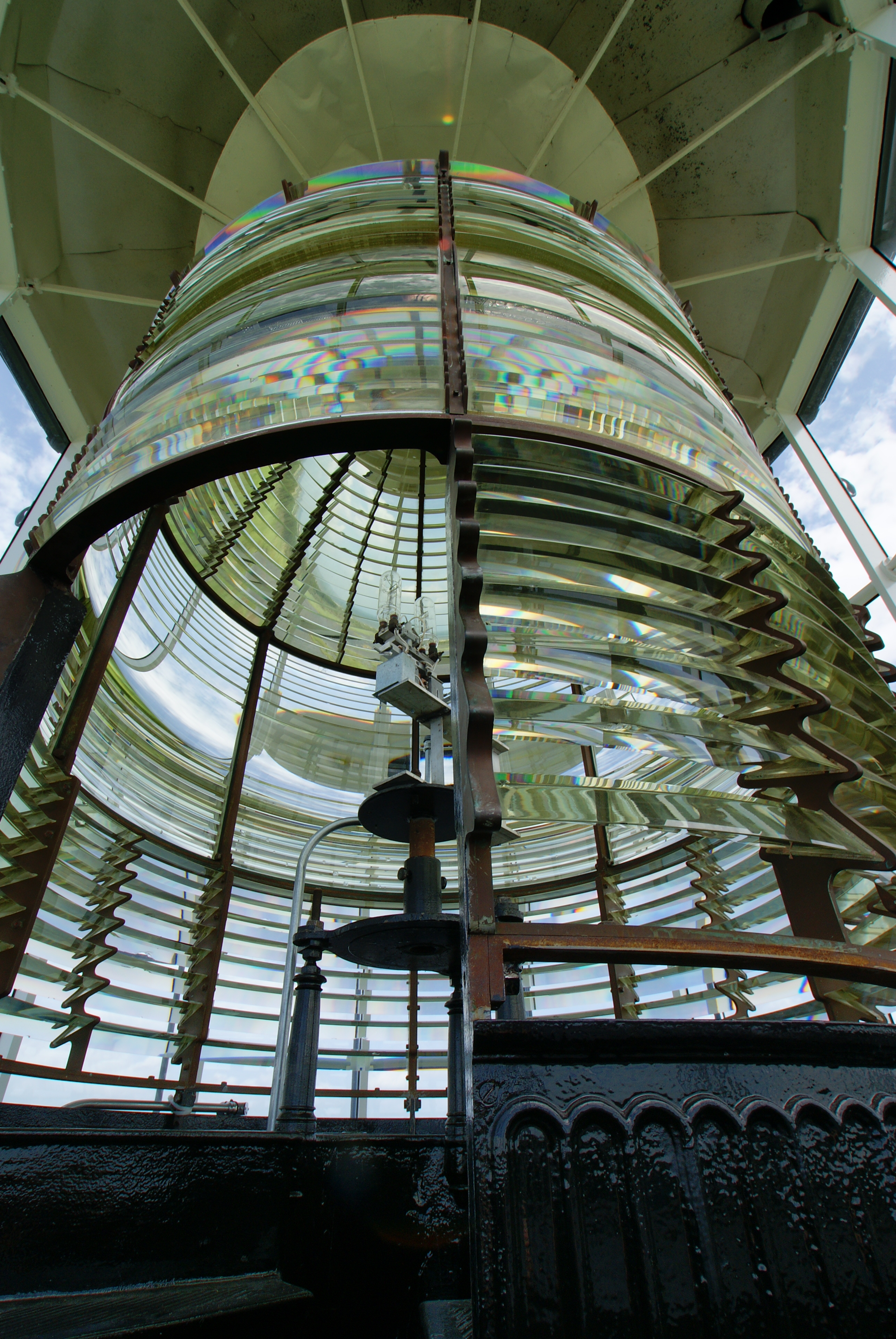
The glass lens inside the Bodie Island Lighthouse

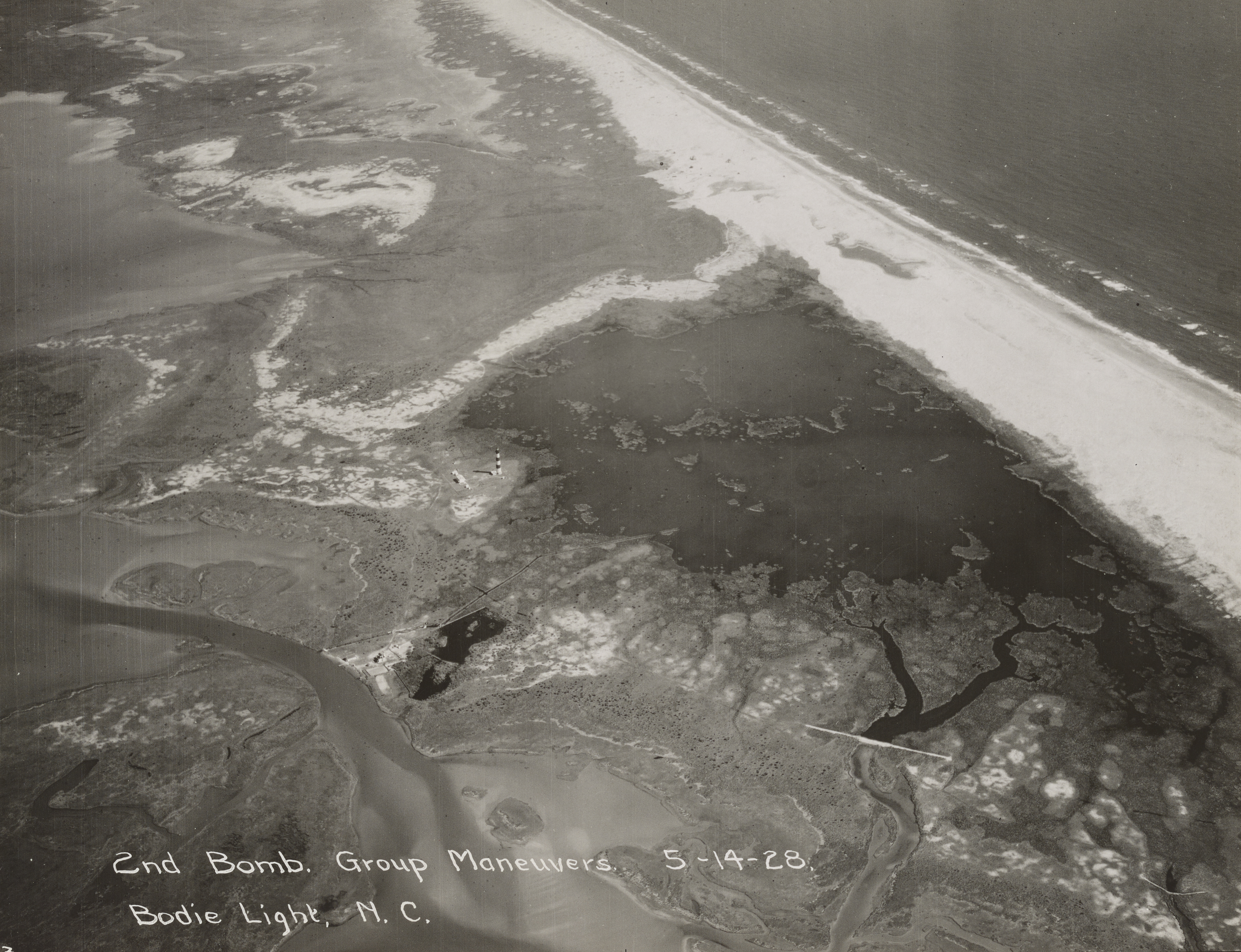
Aerial view of the lighthouse & surrounding area, May 1928

== See also ==
- Lighthouses in the United States
- Currituck Beach Lighthouse – the only other lighthouse in North Carolina that retains an active first-order Fresnel lens
- Dongji Island Lighthouse - painted with a similar pattern
