= List of summer colonies =

The term summer colony is often used, particularly in the United States, to describe well-known resorts and upper-class enclaves, typically located near the ocean, lakes, or mountains of New England, the Northeast United States, or the Great Lakes.

While some have roots in the 18th Century, many began in the 19th Century with the development of railroads and steamships and expanded with the invention of the automobile.

Many of these historic communities are considered quiet bastions of old money, though some, such as The Hamptons, are now well known for their celebrity-driven social scenes. Additionally, their economies tend to be driven largely by this tourist trade, particularly those communities that are remote or on islands. Some summer colonies within sufficient proximity to an urban center, such as Lake Bluff, Illinois or Denville, New Jersey, may eventually become a year-round commuter town, while retaining the original character.

In Canada, the term cottage country is often preferred.

== Well-known summer colonies in North America ==
=== United States ===
==== California ====
- Balboa Island
- Big Sur
- Avalon (an area in Catalina Island)
- Lake Tahoe
- Lower Russian River Area
- Malibu Beach Colony
- Mendocino
- Montecito (an area in Santa Barbara)
- Newport Peninsula (an area in Newport Beach)
- Stinson Beach
- Palm Springs

==== Connecticut ====
- Blue Lake (an area in North Stonington)
- Candlewood Lake (an area in Fairfield County)
- Fenwick (an area in Old Saybrook)
- Gold Coast (an area in Fairfield County)
- Lake Lillinonah
- Litchfield Hills
- New London

==== Delaware ====
- Bethany Beach
- Dewey Beach
- Fenwick Island
- Lewes
- Rehoboth Beach

==== Georgia ====
- St. Simons
- Sea Island
- Jekyll Island

==== Illinois ====
- Chain O'Lakes
- Lake Bluff
- Lake Forest

==== Maine ====
- Bar Harbor and Mount Desert Island
- The Mid Coast, including Boothbay Harbor, Camden, Rockport and Islesboro
- The Southern Maine Coast, including (from south to north)
  - Kittery
  - York
  - Ogunquit
  - Moody Beach (a section of Wells)
  - Kennebunk/Kennebunkport
  - Biddeford Pool
  - Old Orchard Beach
- North Haven
- Vinalhaven
- Winter Harbor, Grindstone Neck

==== Maryland ====
- Cambridge
- Easton
- Ocean City
- St. Michaels

==== Massachusetts ====
- Cape Cod
- Duxbury
- Gloucester
- Great Barrington
- Lenox
- Manchester-by-the-Sea
- Marblehead
- Marion
- Martha's Vineyard
- Nantucket
- Padanaram, South Dartmouth
- Plymouth
- Rockport
- Beverly Farms

==== Michigan ====
- Baldwin
- Beaver Island
- Charlevoix
- Grand Haven
- Harbor Springs
- Mackinac Island
- New Buffalo/Union Pier/Grand Beach
- Lake Michigamme
- Petoskey
- Saugatuck
- South Haven
- Traverse City

==== Minnesota ====
- Lake Minnetonka

==== Missouri ====
- Lake of the Ozarks

==== New Hampshire ====
- Cornish
- Jackson
- Holderness
- Little Boar's Head
- Sugar Hill
- Wolfeboro

==== New Jersey ====
Listed from north to south:

- Franklin Lakes
- Denville
- Rumson
- Elberon
- Deal
- Allenhurst
- Loch Arbour
- Spring Lake
- Sea Girt
- Barnegat Peninsula, including:
  - Point Pleasant Beach
  - Bay Head
  - Mantoloking
  - Lavallette
  - Island Heights
- Long Beach Island, including:
  - Barnegat Light
  - Loveladies
  - North Beach
  - Harvey Cedars
  - Beach Haven
- Brigantine
- Longport
- Avalon
- Stone Harbor
- Cape May

==== New York ====
- Adirondacks
- Chautauqua
- East Marion
- Fire Island
  - Cherry Grove
  - Fire Island Pines
- Fishers Island
- The Hamptons, including (depending on definition):
  - Southampton
  - Water Mill
  - Bridgehampton
  - East Hampton
  - Sagaponack
  - Sag Harbor
  - Amagansett
  - Montauk
- Lake George
- Lake Placid
- Putnam County, New York
  - Brewster
  - Putnam Lake
- Thousand Islands

==== North Carolina ====
Listed from north to south:

- Roaring Gap
- Little Switzerland
- Bodie Island including:
  - Carova
  - Corolla
  - Duck
  - Southern Shores
  - Kitty Hawk
  - Kill Devil Hills
  - Nags Head
- Hatteras Island including:
  - Rodanthe
  - Waves
  - Salvo
  - Avon
  - Buxton
  - Frisco
  - Hatteras
- Ocracoke Island
- Crystal Coast including:
  - Atlantic Beach
  - Pine Knoll Shores
  - Indian Beach
  - Salter Path
  - Emerald Isle
- Topsail Island including:
  - North Topsail Beach
  - Surf City
  - Topsail Beach
- Figure Eight Island
- Wrightsville Beach
- Pleasure Island including:
  - Carolina Beach
  - Kure Beach
- Bald Head Island
- Oak Island
- Holden Beach
- Ocean Isle Beach

==== Ohio ====
- Kelleys Island
- Lakeside
- Marblehead
- Middle Bass Island
- South Bass Island
- Vermilion

==== Pennsylvania ====
- Pocono Mountains
- Erie

==== Rhode Island ====
- Block Island
- Little Compton
- Narragansett
- Newport
- Watch Hill

==== Virginia ====
- Colonial Beach
- Chincoteague
- Deltaville
- Gwynn's Island
- Hot Springs
- Sandbridge
- Warm Springs

==== Washington ====
- Seabrook*

==== Wisconsin ====
- Door County
- Eagle River
- Elkhart Lake
- Green Lake
- Lake Geneva
- Madeline Island
- Manitowish Waters
- Minocqua
- Twin Lakes

=== Canada ===
==== Prince Edward Island ====
- Cavendish, Prince Edward Island

==== Nova Scotia ====
- Bras d'Or Lake
- Annapolis Royal
- Lunenburg County including Chester, Mahone Bay, Lunenburg as well as First and Second Peninsula
- St. Margaret’s Bay

==== New Brunswick ====
- St. Andrews

==== Quebec ====
- Eastern Townships
- Laurentides
- Outaouais

==== Ontario ====
- Central Ontario, including:
  - Parry Sound-Muskoka-Haliburton
  - Kawartha Lakes
  - Bancroft and Northern Hastings County
  - Ottawa Valley
- Eastern Ontario
  - Rideau Lakes
  - Prince Edward County
- Northwestern Ontario
  - Kenora, Ontario

==== Manitoba ====
- Whiteshell Provincial Park
- Eastern Manitoba
- Interlake
- Riding Mountain National Park
- Onanole
- Wasagaming

==== Saskatchewan ====
- Prince Albert National Park

==== Alberta ====
- Banff, Alberta
- Canmore, Alberta

==== British Columbia ====
- Shawnigan Lake, British Columbia
- Lake Country, British Columbia
- Whistler, British Columbia

== Summer colonies outside of North America ==
=== The Philippines ===
- Baguio

== See also ==
- Hill station
- Summer capital
- Country estate
- Social season
