= Rasmus Midgett =

Rasmus S. Midgett (1851–1926) was a United States Life-Saving Service surfman in North Carolina who single-handedly rescued ten men from the sinking barkentine Priscilla and was thereafter awarded the Gold Lifesaving Medal from the Secretary of the Treasury on October 18, 1899.

Midgett was one of seven members of the Midgett family to be awarded the Gold Lifesaving Medal. The USCGC Midgett is named in their honor.

== Account of the rescue ==
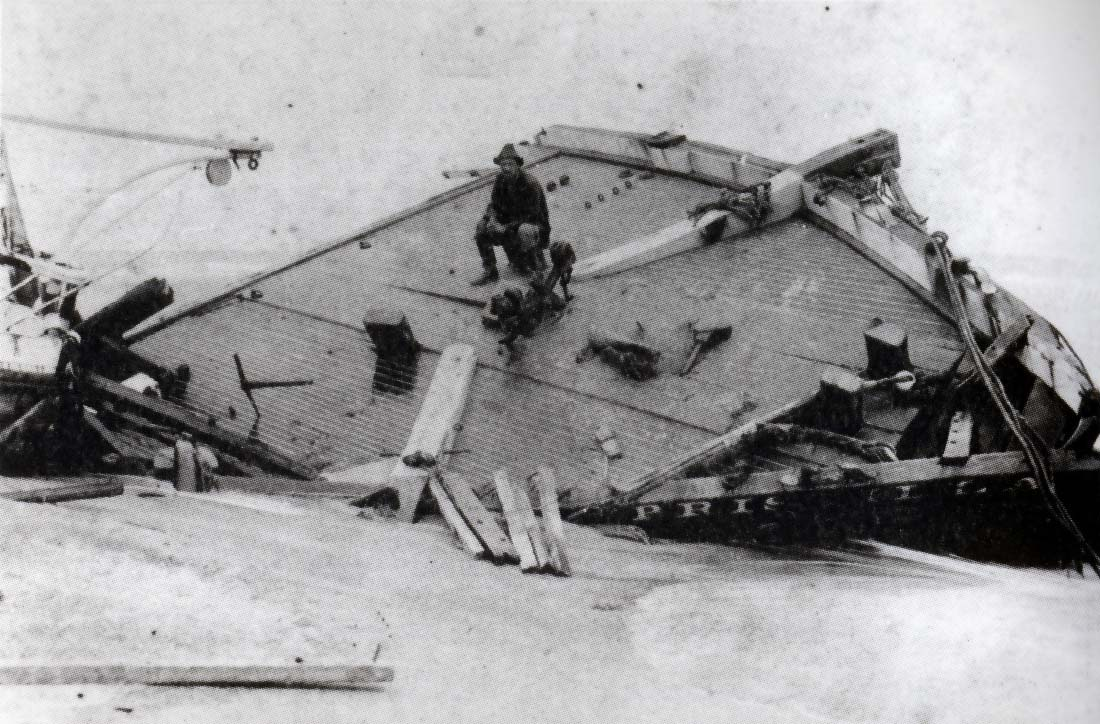
Rasmus Midgett sits on the wreckage of the Priscilla, which was situated about halfway between Salvo and Avon

Erasmus S. Midgett is listed in some records as Edward S. Midgett. He was named for St.Elmo/ Erasmus, the patron saint of sailors. Rasmus went to grammar school at Southern Woods, now Waves, NC where he proved good at arithmetic and handwriting. Rasmus Midgett, one of a long line of North Carolina surfmen known as the Mighty Midgetts, was on patrol for the Gull Shoals Lifesaving Station on August 18, 1899. He left the station at Salvo for the southward patrol at 3:00 am on his horse, Gilbert. Approximately three-fourths of a mile from the station, he saw items newly washed ashore, which indicated a shipwreck. After traveling two more miles and finding much more debris, he heard what sounded like sails frapping and then faint voices. He flashed his lantern over the ocean and saw something out over the high flood tide. A ship had keeled over approximately 25 feet from shore and the mast had fallen across the ship. It was still dark, and Midgett could not see far. However, he managed to make out the remains of a shipwrecked vessel that had run aground, with men clutching to remaining wood approximately 100 yards from him. It was approximately 4:30 am.

The Priscilla, a 643-ton barkentine, was out of Baltimore, Maryland on August 12, 1899, passing the Virginia Capes at 6:00 am on August 14, and bound for Rio de Janeiro, Brazil. She was captained by Benjamin Springsteen, who was joined by his wife and 12-year-old son, Elmer, and crewed by 12 including another son, William Nate. At 3:00 am on the stormy, windy, and rainy evening of August 18, Surfman Erasmus Midgett left Gull Shoals Life Saving Station on beach patrol. At about the same time the Priscilla bottomed out as the result of 100 mph winds from an intense hurricane which went on to become the longest lived Atlantic hurricane in recorded history. The seas broke over Priscilla with such force that Captain Springsteen's wife and son and two crewmen were washed away. An hour later the hull broke in two and the crew congregated on the aft part. The aft section was continually swept by the sea and finally settled near the shore. She grounded three miles south of Gull Shoals Station and 2.5 miles north of Little Kinnakeet Station. Today, the Priscilla wreck is located just north of Avon, NC at GPS coordinates 35.458859°N 75.482629°W.

Midgett had to make a difficult decision: to spend three hours bringing assistance from the station, or to attempt a rescue without any aid. Furthermore, if Midgett was incapacitated while attempting an individual rescue, another patrol would not find the men for hours. By then, it would probably be too late. Midgett decided to try rescuing the men immediately.

The surf was violent, breaching the narrow stretch of sand between the ocean and Pamlico Sound. Midgett waited until a wave had receded, then ran as close as he dared, yelling instructions to the shipwrecked men. He told them that when he called, one man should jump off the floating debris and head towards shore, with Midgett assisting him. As soon as Midgett had a chance, he again ran forward, calling for a man to jump. He then helped the man reach the shore, pulling him through the waves.

Midgett repeated this six more times, but then faced another problem. There were three men remaining in the water, but they were too exhausted to swim towards shore. Midgett fearlessly entered the sea, and one by one, carried each remaining man to the beach. The seven men who were still able to walk began heading towards the station at Midgett's direction, while he himself cared for the remaining three, including the Captain of the Priscilla, Benjamin E. Springsteen, who survived the ship wreck but would die a year later. After Midgett was certain that the three men would be safe and giving his own coat to Captain Springsteen, he rode his horse back to the station to summon the aid of his comrades.

Keeper Pugh was on the beach when Midgett came into sight. Upon hearing Midgett's amazing story, Pugh ordered two of the surfmen to harness horses to their carts and proceed to bring up the disabled men. The other surfmen he directed to set up a stove in the sitting room and prepare for the castaways.

For this rescue Lt. C.E. Johnston recommended, based on the transcript of the station log, the wreck report of the Keeper, and the report of the Assistant who investigated the loss of life, that Rasmus Midgett be awarded the Gold Lifesaving Medal. Midgett was subsequently awarded a Gold Lifesaving Medal by the Secretary of the Treasury. With the award the Secretary transmitted a highly commendatory letter reciting the story of the brave man's heroism. The inscription read on one side: To Rasmus Midgett for rescuing singlehanded ten men from the Priscilla, August 18, 1899. and on the other: In Testimony of Heroic Deeds in the Saving of Life from the Perils of the Sea. Midgett was awarded the Gold Lifesaving Medal on October 18, 1899.

== Personal life ==
Midgett was born Erasmus S. Midgett in 1851 on Hatteras Island. At that time, Hatteras Island was part of Hyde County (it is now part of Dare County.) He stayed on Hatteras Island for most of his life. He was father to Arthur Midgett by Matilda Midgett. Rasmus Midget lived in Waves, NC; 5 miles south of Chicamacomico Station and is buried in Waves, on the west side of NC 12 (GPS coordinates 35°34'20.1”N 75°28'13.3”W). He had 13 grandchildren and 31 great-grandchildren, including Christopher and Tiffany Foster. He died on Hatteras Island in 1926. His house was recently restored and will be turned into a museum.
