= Frisco, North Carolina =

- Census-designated place
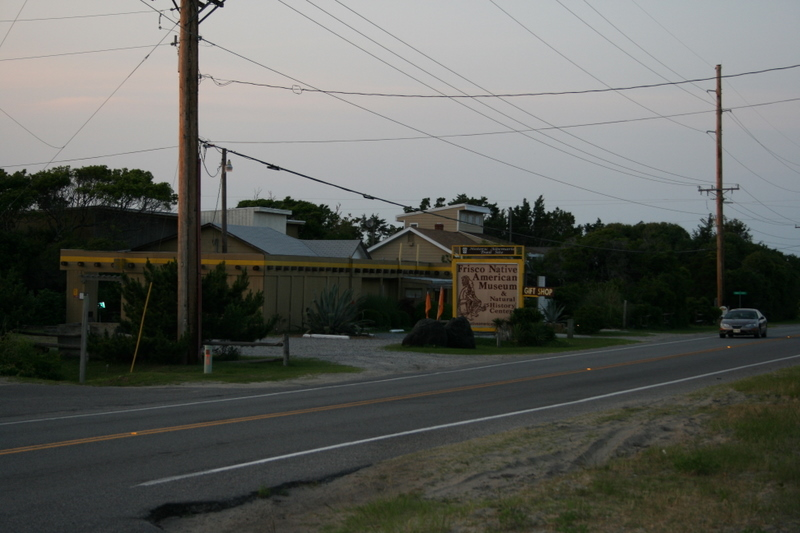
- Frisco Native American Museum

- Location in Dare County and the state of North Carolina
- Coordinates: 35°13′47″N 75°37′56″W
- Country: United States of America
- State: North Carolina
- County: Dare
- Founded: 1898
- Named after: San Francisco, CA

Area
  - Total: 6.25 sq mi (16.20 km^{2})
  - Land: 4.84 sq mi (12.54 km^{2})
  - Water: 1.41 sq mi (3.66 km^{2})
- Elevation: 3 ft (0.91 m)

Population (2020)
  - Total: 994
  - Density: 205.3/sq mi (79.25/km^{2})
- Time zone: UTC-5 (Eastern (EST))
  - Summer (DST): UTC-4 (EDT)
- ZIP code: 27936
- FIPS code: 37-25020

Frisco is a small unincorporated community and census-designated place (CDP) on the barrier island of Hatteras Island, between the villages of Buxton and Hatteras. It is located in Dare County, North Carolina, United States, and was previously named "Trent", or "Trent Woods", but received a new name with the coming of the post office in 1898. Most of the land is taken by houses available for rental during the summer months, and as such the community's population varies seasonally. As of the 2020 census, the population is 994. North Carolina Highway 12 serves as the primary road in Frisco and connects the community to others on the island.

Billy Mitchell Airport is located in Frisco and was named after former Army General Billy Mitchell. Across the street from the small, local airfield is the Frisco Native American Museum.

The residents of Frisco are governed by the Dare County Board of Commissioners. Frisco is part of District 4, along with Avon, Buxton, Hatteras, Rodanthe, Waves and Salvo.

== Demographics ==
Historical population
Census	Pop.	Note	%±
2020	994		—
U.S. Decennial Census

=== 2020 census ===
Frisco racial composition
Race	Number	Percentage
White (non-Hispanic)	924	92.96%
Black or African American (non-Hispanic)	2	0.2%
Native American	5	0.5%
Asian	4	0.4%
Pacific Islander	1	0.1%
Other/Mixed	18	1.81%
Hispanic or Latino	40	4.02%

As of the 2020 United States census, there were 994 people, 76 households, and 28 families residing in the CDP.

== Public services ==
- Billy Mitchell Airport

== Notable attractions and museum ==
- Cape Hatteras National Seashore
- Frisco Pier (Destroyed by Hurricane Earl, 2010)
- Frisco Native American Museum, where collections of indigenous artifacts of the Outer Bankers (Native Croatan and other original barrier island tribes) are on display.
- Many trails through acres of maritime forest.
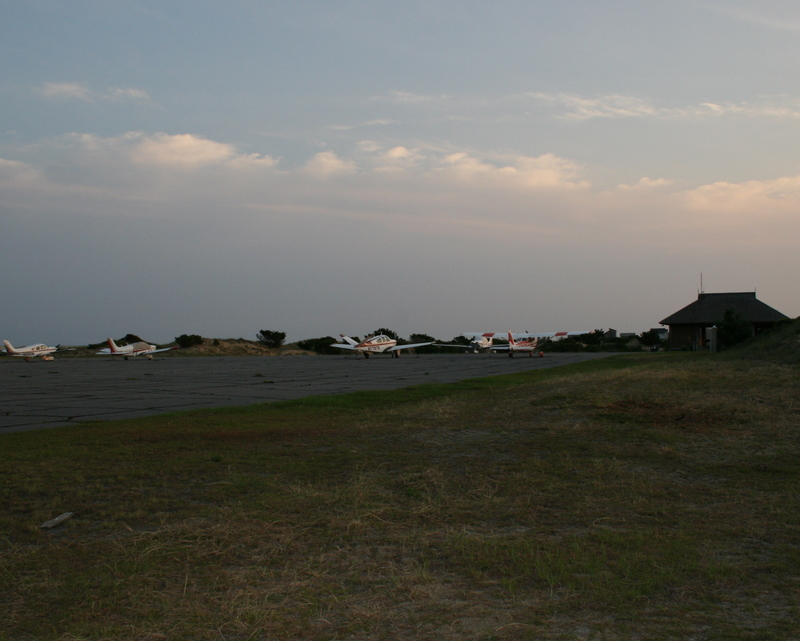
Billy Mitchell Airport, June 2007

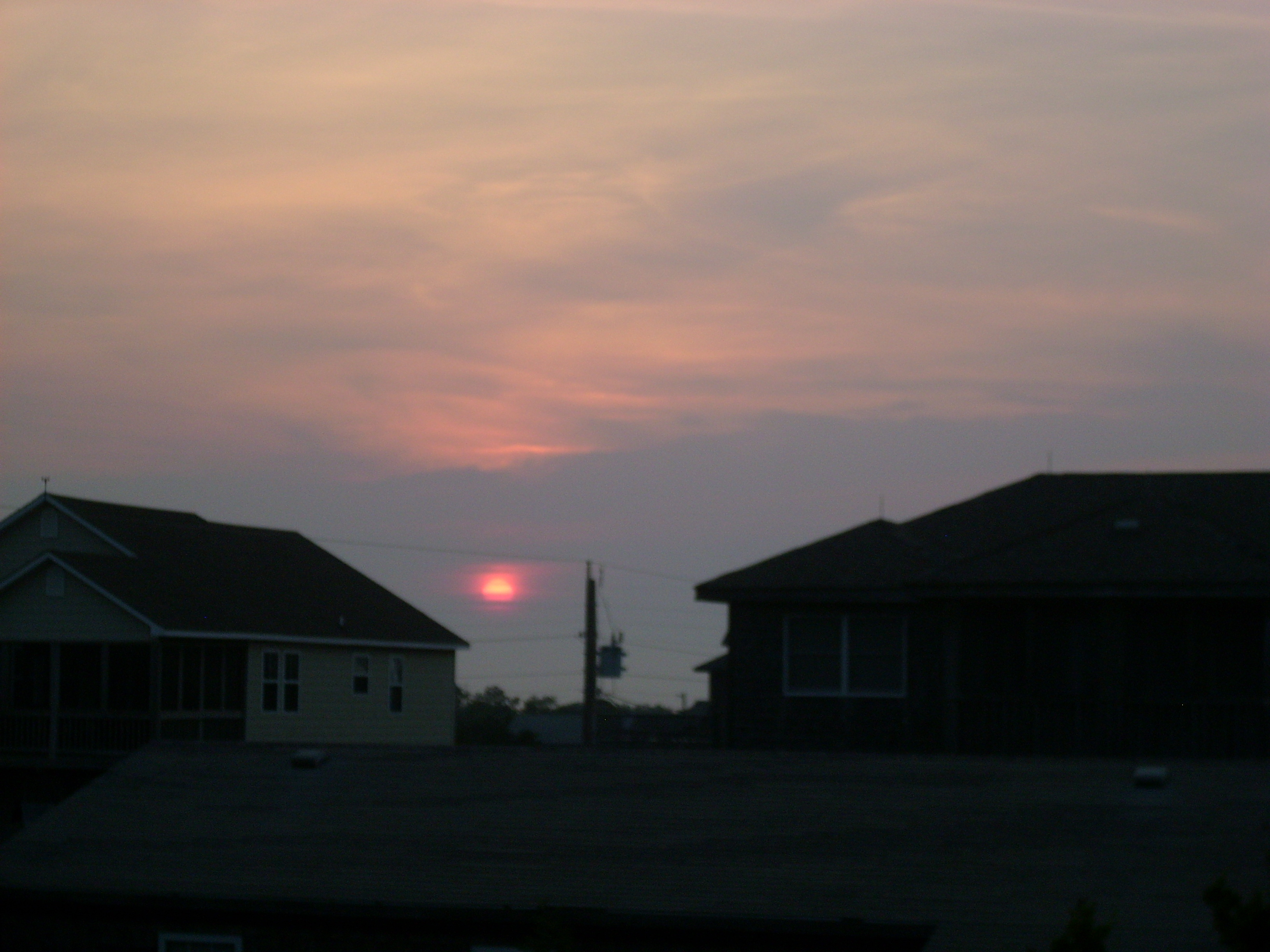
Sunset at Frisco, June 2008

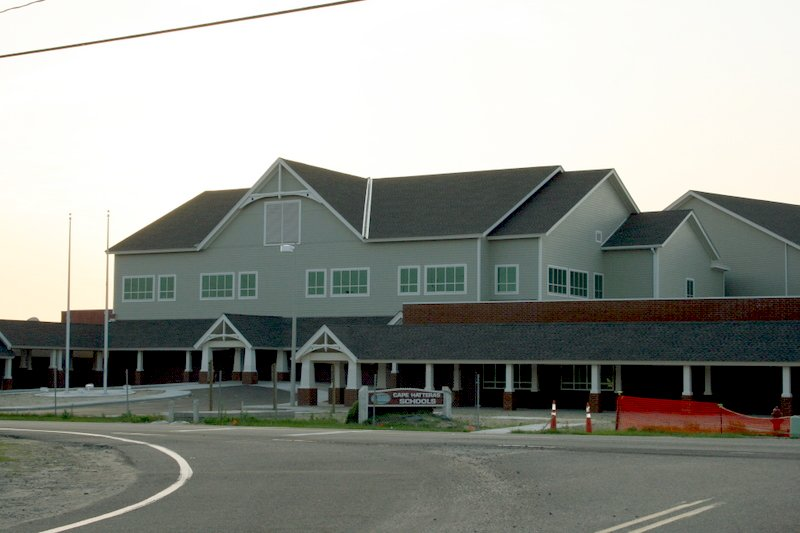
Construction of the new Cape Hatteras Elementary and Secondary School, June 2007

== Climate ==
According to the Trewartha climate classification system, Frisco, North Carolina has a humid subtropical climate with hot and humid summers, cool winters and year-around precipitation (Cfak). Cfak climates are characterized by all months having an average mean temperature > 32.0 °F (> 0.0 °C), at least eight months with an average mean temperature ≥ 50.0 °F (≥ 10.0 °C), at least one month with an average mean temperature ≥ 71.6 °F (≥ 22.0 °C) and no significant precipitation difference between seasons. During the summer months in Frisco, a cooling afternoon sea breeze is present on most days, but episodes of extreme heat and humidity can occur with heat index values ≥ 100 °F (≥ 38 °C). Frisco is prone to hurricane strikes, particularly during the Atlantic hurricane season which extends from June 1 through November 30, sharply peaking from late August through September. During the winter months, episodes of cold and wind can occur with wind chill values < 15 °F (< -9 °C). The plant hardiness zone in Frisco is 8b with an average annual extreme minimum air temperature of 19.9 °F (-6.7 °C). The average seasonal (Dec-Mar) snowfall total is < 2 inches (< 5 cm), and the average annual peak in nor'easter activity is in February.

Climate data for Frisco, North Carolina (1991–2020 normals)
Month	Jan	Feb	Mar	Apr	May	Jun	Jul	Aug	Sep	Oct	Nov	Dec	Year
Mean daily maximum °F (°C)	53.9 (12.2)	57.1 (13.9)	61.8 (16.6)	69.3 (20.7)	76.9 (24.9)	83.8 (28.8)	86.7 (30.4)	86.7 (30.4)	82.2 (27.9)	73.8 (23.2)	65.0 (18.3)	57.6 (14.2)	71.2 (21.8)
Daily mean °F (°C)	46.9 (8.3)	48.9 (9.4)	53.9 (12.2)	61.9 (16.6)	70.0 (21.1)	77.5 (25.3)	80.7 (27.1)	80.5 (26.9)	76.4 (24.7)	67.3 (19.6)	58.3 (14.6)	51.2 (10.7)	64.5 (18.1)
Mean daily minimum °F (°C)	39.9 (4.4)	40.7 (4.8)	46.0 (7.8)	54.5 (12.5)	63.1 (17.3)	71.1 (21.7)	74.7 (23.7)	74.2 (23.4)	70.6 (21.4)	60.8 (16.0)	51.5 (10.8)	44.7 (7.1)	57.6 (14.2)
Average precipitation inches (mm)	4.65 (118)	4.30 (109)	4.17 (106)	3.95 (100)	4.48 (114)	4.82 (122)	5.57 (141)	7.03 (179)	8.10 (206)	5.23 (133)	4.70 (119)	4.56 (116)	61.56 (1,564)
Source: NOAA

== Ecology ==
According to the A. W. Kuchler U.S. potential natural vegetation types, Frisco, North Carolina would have a dominant vegetation type of Live oak/Sea Oats Uniola paniculata (90) with a dominant vegetation form of Coastal Prairie (20).

== Education ==
Residents are zoned to Dare County Schools. Zoned schools are Cape Hatteras Elementary School and Cape Hatteras Secondary School.

Preceded by Cape Hatteras	Beaches of The Outer Banks	Succeeded by Hatteras
