= Rodanthe, North Carolina =

- Census-designated place
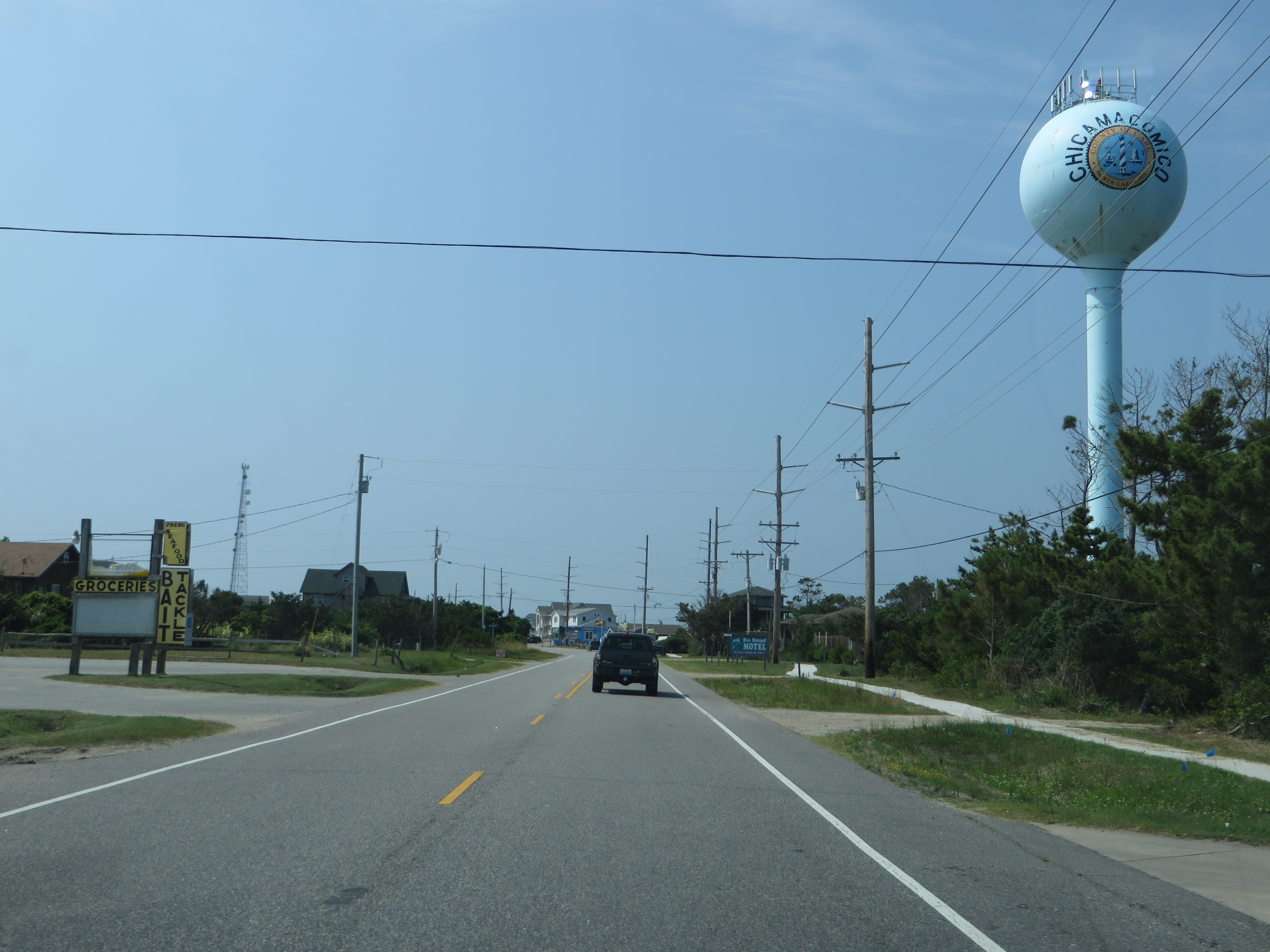

- Location in Dare County and the state of North Carolina

- Location within the state of North Carolina
- Coordinates: 35°35′36″N 75°28′4″W
- Country: United States
- State: North Carolina
- County: Dare

Area
  - Total: 0.96 sq mi (2.48 km^{2})
  - Land: 0.96 sq mi (2.48 km^{2})
  - Water: 0 sq mi (0.00 km^{2})
- Elevation: 5 ft (1.5 m)

Population (2020)
  - Total: 213
  - Density: 222.8/sq mi (86.02/km^{2})
- Time zone: UTC-5 (Eastern (EST))
  - Summer (DST): UTC-4 (EDT)
- ZIP code: 27968
- Area code: 252
- GNIS feature ID: 1022381
- FIPS code: 37-57580

Rodanthe (/roʊˈdænθi/ roh-DAN-thee) is an unincorporated community and census-designated place (CDP) located in Dare County, North Carolina, United States, on Hatteras Island, part of North Carolina's Outer Banks. As of the 2020 census it had a population of 213. Rodanthe, along with Waves and Salvo, are part of the settlement of Chicamacomico. Rodanthe includes the original Chicamacomico Life-Saving Station, decommissioned in 1954, but now a museum.

Rodanthe is served by North Carolina Highway 12, which runs north–south through town. The Chicamacomico area is bordered to the north by Pea Island National Wildlife Refuge and to the south by Cape Hatteras National Seashore, a situation which limits potential growth. The town is bordered by the Atlantic Ocean to the east and Pamlico Sound to the west.

Rodanthe is the easternmost point of North Carolina. It is famous for its observation of "Old Christmas" on January 6, formerly Christmas, December 25, by the Julian Calendar, a custom held over from the original settlers who still used the "Old Style" calendar. A mythical beast, "Old Buck"—possibly related to Belsnickel or Krampus who are companions of Saint Nicholas in Christmas festivities—is said to appear at the celebration.

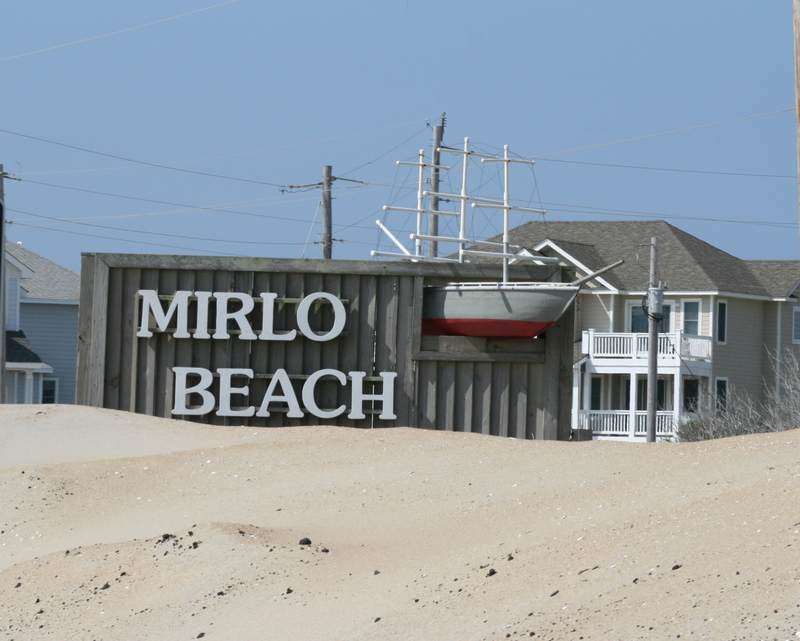
Mirlo Beach

The residents of Rodanthe are governed by the Dare County Board of Commissioners. Rodanthe is part of District 4, along with Avon, Buxton, Frisco, Hatteras, Waves and Salvo.

The Chicamacomico Life Saving Station and Oregon Inlet Station are listed on the National Register of Historic Places.

== Demographics ==
Historical population
Census	Pop.	Note	%±
2020	213		—
U.S. Decennial Census

=== 2020 census ===
Rodanthe racial composition
Race	Number	Percentage
White (non-Hispanic)	195	91.55%
Other/Mixed	10	4.69%
Hispanic or Latino	8	3.76%

As of the 2020 United States census, there were 213 people, 81 households, and 44 families residing in the CDP.

== Tourist economy ==
Many of Rodanthe's restaurants, shops and markets are seasonal, closing during the winter months and reopening the following spring. Many of these are family-owned, rather than chain franchises. Provisions can still be purchased on the Outer Banks during the winter months, but a short drive south to Avon or north to Nags Head is required.

There are two motels within the larger settlement of Chicamacomico, plus three other inns or bed and breakfasts on the island of Hatteras. There are numerous rental houses, as well as numerous campgrounds. Several smaller campgrounds cater to water sports enthusiasts. Local water sports include fishing, kayaking (both ocean and sound-side), swimming, sailboarding, surfing, kiteboarding, and wreck diving.

== Climate ==
According to the Trewartha climate classification system, Rodanthe, North Carolina, has a humid subtropical climate with hot and humid summers, cool winters and year-around precipitation (Cfak). Cfak climates are characterized by all months having an average mean temperature > 32.0 °F (> 0.0 °C), at least eight months with an average mean temperature ≥ 50.0 °F (≥ 10.0 °C), at least one month with an average mean temperature ≥ 71.6 °F (≥ 22.0 °C) and no significant precipitation difference between seasons. During the summer months in Rodanthe, a sea breeze is present on most days, but episodes of extreme heat and humidity can occur with heat index values ≥ 100 °F (≥ 38 °C). Rodanthe is prone to hurricane strikes, particularly during the Atlantic hurricane season which extends from June 1 through November 30, sharply peaking from late August through September. During the winter months, episodes of cold and wind can occur with wind chill values < 10 °F (< −12 °C). The plant hardiness zone in Rodanthe is 8b with an average annual extreme minimum air temperature of 16.9 °F (−8.4 °C). The average seasonal (Dec-Mar) snowfall total is < 2 inches (< 5 cm), and the average annual peak in nor'easter activity is in February.

Climate data for Rodanthe, NC (1991–2020 averages)
Month	Jan	Feb	Mar	Apr	May	Jun	Jul	Aug	Sep	Oct	Nov	Dec	Year
Mean daily maximum °F (°C)	53.3 (11.8)	54.1 (12.3)	58.7 (14.8)	66.2 (19.0)	73.4 (23.0)	80.8 (27.1)	84.4 (29.1)	83.7 (28.7)	79.8 (26.6)	71.9 (22.2)	63.3 (17.4)	57.1 (13.9)	68.9 (20.5)
Daily mean °F (°C)	46.9 (8.3)	47.6 (8.7)	52.5 (11.4)	60.4 (15.8)	68.2 (20.1)	76.1 (24.5)	79.9 (26.6)	79.3 (26.3)	75.6 (24.2)	67.1 (19.5)	57.9 (14.4)	51.3 (10.7)	63.6 (17.6)
Mean daily minimum °F (°C)	40.5 (4.7)	41.2 (5.1)	46.2 (7.9)	54.5 (12.5)	62.9 (17.2)	71.4 (21.9)	75.3 (24.1)	74.8 (23.8)	71.4 (21.9)	62.3 (16.8)	52.5 (11.4)	45.5 (7.5)	58.2 (14.6)
Average precipitation inches (mm)	4.13 (105)	3.55 (90)	3.65 (93)	3.51 (89)	4.04 (103)	4.53 (115)	6.11 (155)	6.36 (162)	6.54 (166)	4.41 (112)	4.12 (105)	4.18 (106)	55.13 (1,400)
Average relative humidity (%)	69.8	69.4	68.1	69.7	72.9	76.2	78.7	77.0	74.4	71.0	72.0	70.3	72.5
Average dew point °F (°C)	38.3 (3.5)	38.8 (3.8)	43.2 (6.2)	51.5 (10.8)	60.0 (15.6)	68.3 (20.2)	72.7 (22.6)	72.0 (22.2)	67.6 (19.8)	58.1 (14.5)	49.0 (9.4)	43.0 (6.1)	55.2 (12.9)
Source: PRISM

Climate data for Duck, NC, ocean water temperature (44 NW Rodanthe)
Month	Jan	Feb	Mar	Apr	May	Jun	Jul	Aug	Sep	Oct	Nov	Dec	Year
Daily mean °F (°C)	45 (7)	44 (7)	46 (8)	59 (15)	67 (19)	74 (23)	71 (22)	74 (23)	75 (24)	69 (21)	59 (15)	52 (11)	61 (16)
Source: NOAA

== Ecology ==
According to the A. W. Kuchler U.S. potential natural vegetation types, Rodanthe would have a dominant vegetation type of live oak/sea oats Uniola paniculata (90) with a dominant vegetation form of Coastal Prairie (20).

== Education ==
Residents are zoned to Dare County Schools. Zoned schools are Cape Hatteras Elementary School and Cape Hatteras Secondary School.

== In popular culture ==
=== Nights in Rodanthe ===
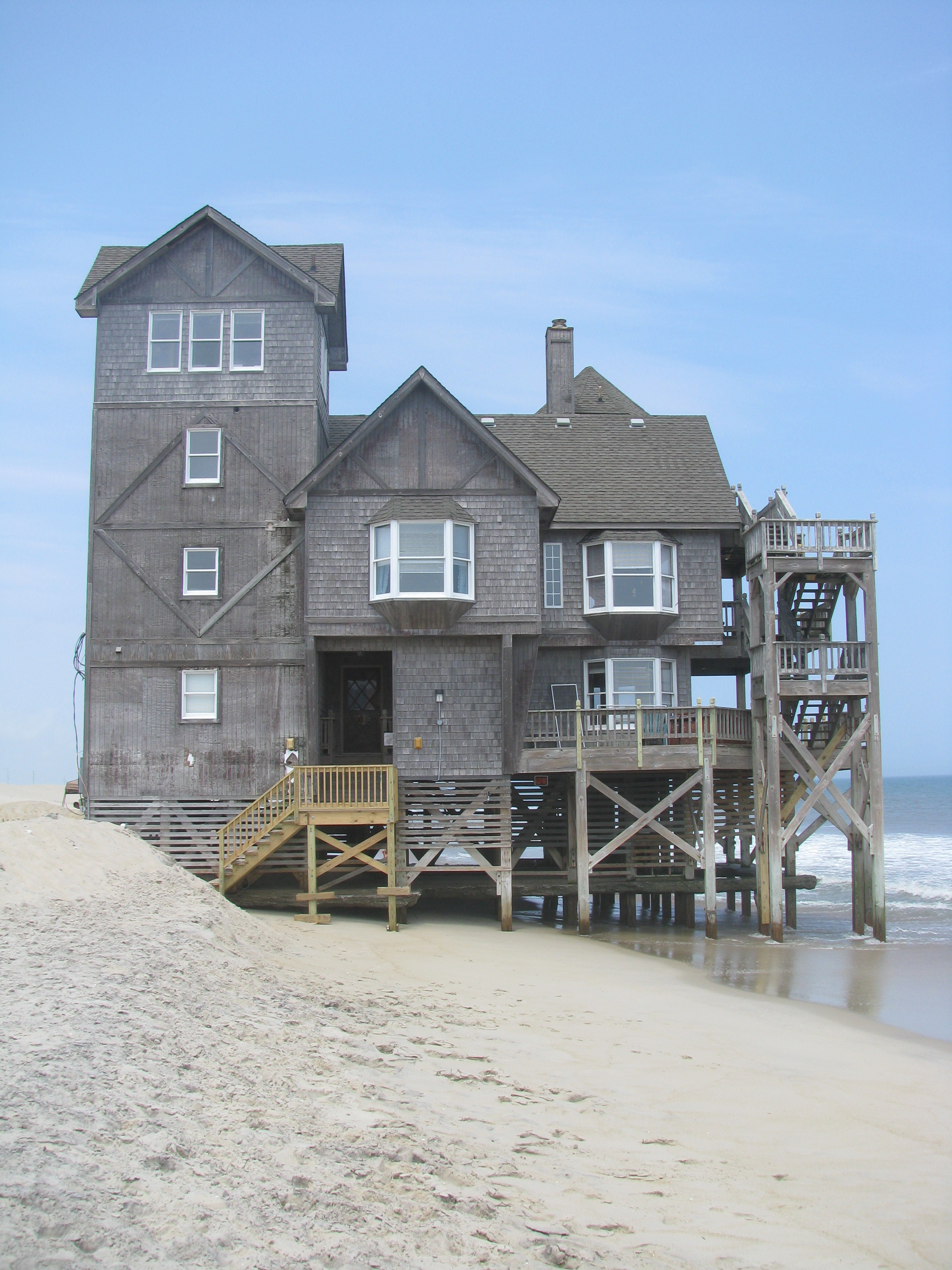
The rental house Serendipity, used in filming Nights in Rodanthe

In 2002, Nicholas Sparks published the book Nights in Rodanthe, a romance novel about two visitors to Rodanthe. George C. Wolfe directed a film adaptation of the same name, which was partially filmed in the town of Rodanthe and entirely filmed in eastern North Carolina – including Cape Hatteras, Southport and Wilmington. The movie was released on September 26, 2008. Several Rodanthe landmarks such as the Rodanthe Pier were used during filming. During film production, one of the rental houses, "Serendipity", the northeasternmost house in Rodanthe, was transformed into the fictional "Inn at Rodanthe". In November 2009, the house was damaged and declared a public nuisance by Dare County after a nor'easter storm. The house was saved from demolition by a private businessman, Ben Huss, a bail bondsman, from Newton, North Carolina. Threatened by erosion, the house was moved less than one mile south. The interior and exterior of the property were meticulously renovated to replicate the house presented in the film. Now a vacation rental, the Inn at Rodanthe has become a popular Outer Banks attraction and is booked year-round.

Preceded by Pea Island	Beaches of The Outer Banks	Succeeded by Waves
