= Buxton, North Carolina =

- Census-designated place
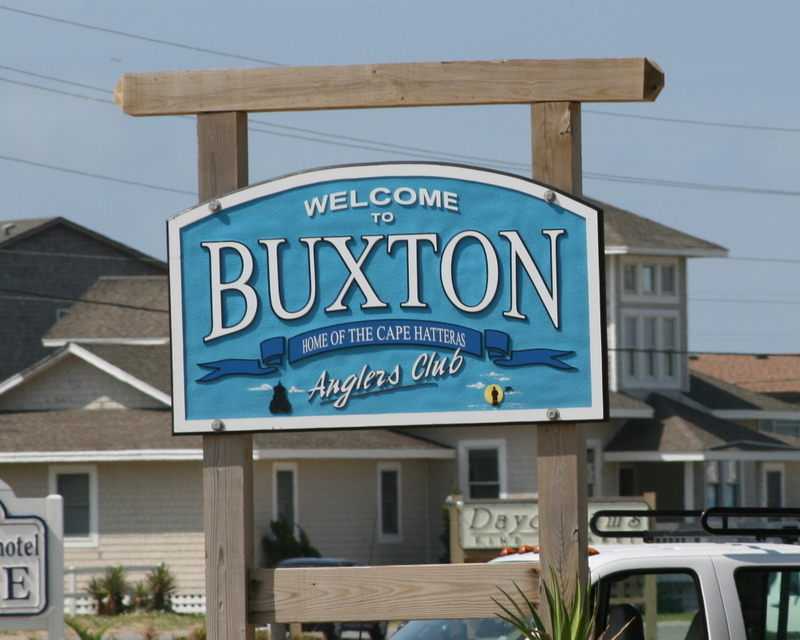
- Welcome sign

- Location in Dare County and the state of North Carolina.

- Location in North Carolina and the United States Buxton (the United States)
- Coordinates: 35°16′4″N 75°32′33″W
- Country: United States of America
- State: North Carolina
- County: Dare
- Named after: Ralph P. Buxton

Area
  - Total: 8.80 sq mi (22.78 km^{2})
  - Land: 7.84 sq mi (20.31 km^{2})
  - Water: 0.95 sq mi (2.47 km^{2})
- Elevation: 11 ft (3.4 m)

Population (2020)
  - Total: 1,181
  - Density: 150.6/sq mi (58.14/km^{2})
- Time zone: UTC-5 (Eastern (EST))
  - Summer (DST): UTC-4 (EDT)
- ZIP code: 27920
- FIPS code: 37-09400

Buxton is an unincorporated community and census-designated place (CDP) on Hatteras Island (part of the Outer Banks) near Cape Hatteras. It is located in Dare County in the U.S. state of North Carolina. As of the 2020 census, it had a population of 1,181. Located at the widest part of Hatteras Island, it is the largest community on Hatteras Island both in terms of area and population, and is home to the island's schools and other major public buildings and offices.

North Carolina Highway 12 links the community to other Outer Banks communities such as Avon, Frisco, and Hatteras. Buxton is most famous for being the location of Cape Hatteras Light and of the accompanied beaches; it is also the home of the Cape Hatteras Anglers Club.

The residents of Buxton are governed by the Dare County Board of Commissioners. Buxton is part of District 4, along with Avon, Frisco, Hatteras, Rodanthe, Waves and Salvo.

In addition to Cape Hatteras Light, the SS Lancing shipwreck was listed on the National Register of Historic Places in 2013.

== Geography ==
Buxton is about 240-miles southeast from Raleigh on Hatteras Island, one of the barrier islands along N.C. 12, which are part of Cape Hatteras National Seashore, a United States national seashore of 70 miles (110 km) which preserves the portion of the Outer Banks of North Carolina from Bodie Island to Ocracoke Island. Cape Hatteras National Seashore is managed by the National Park Service.

== History ==
In the precolumbian era the central village on Hatteras island was called Croatoan (council town, which is modern day Buxton), which is why the Native Americans and the island were referred to by the English as Croatoans from Croatoan.

On May 21, 1942, the body of a British seaman, unidentifiable but presumed to be from the HMT Bedfordshire, sunk by a German U-boat, washed ashore. The month prior, a British sailor from the sunken merchant ship San Delfino had been buried in Buxton. The Bedfordshire seaman was interred in an adjacent plot, resulting in a British Cemetery, formally known as Cape Hatteras Coast Guard Burial Ground.

From 1956-1982 Naval Facility Cape Hatteras occupied Cape Hatteras, for secret monitoring of submarines. As of 2013 the 12 buildings had been torn down but the soil underneath not been cleaned up ith its benzanthracene, benzopyrene, heavy metals ( arsenic, chromium and mercury) and other contamination. The National Park Service did not want to take on liability.

== Demographics ==
Historical population
Census	Pop.	Note	%±
2020	1,181		—
U.S. Decennial Census

=== 2020 census ===
Buxton racial composition
Race	Number	Percentage
White (non-Hispanic)	1,038	87.89%
Black or African American (non-Hispanic)	11	0.93%
Native American	4	0.34%
Asian	5	0.42%
Other/Mixed	37	3.13%
Hispanic or Latino	86	7.28%

As of the 2020 United States census, there were 1,181 people, 572 households, and 405 families residing in the CDP.

== Recreation ==
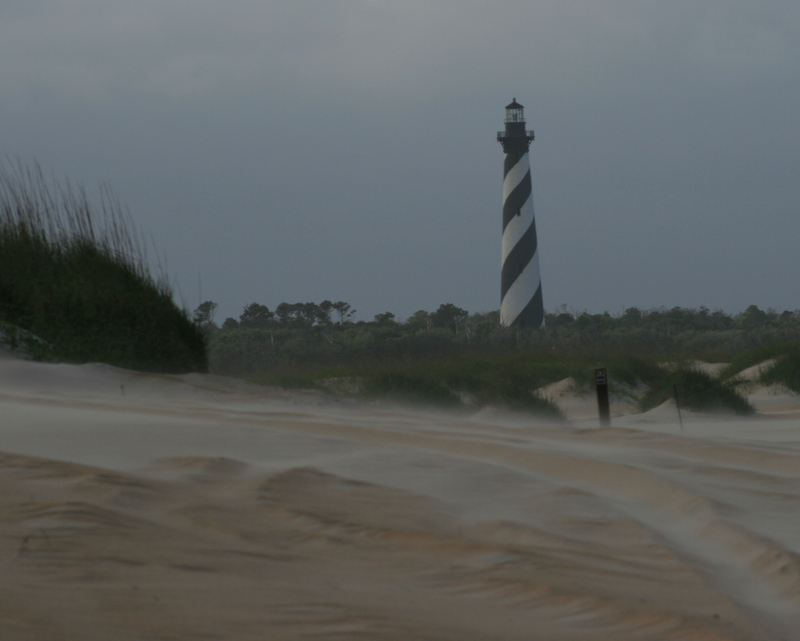
A view of the Cape Hatteras Lighthouse from the beach

Watersports are common on both the Pamlico Sound side and the Atlantic Ocean side of the community. Proximity to the convergence of the Labrador Current and the Gulf Stream result in some of the largest surf available on the East Coast. On the protected soundside of the island, watersports such as windsurfing, kayaking, kiteboarding, and swimming are all readily available and accessible.

== Education ==
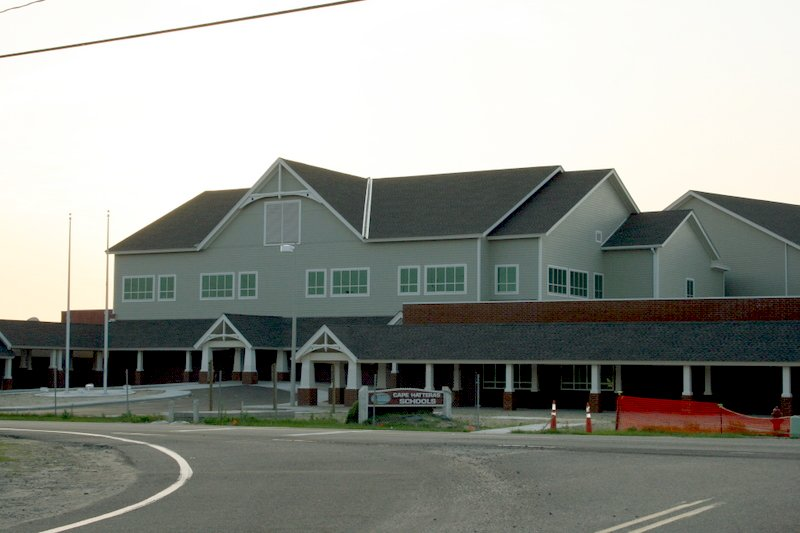
Construction of the new Cape Hatteras Secondary School

Residents are served by the new Cape Hatteras Elementary School, opened in 2001 (home of the Tropical Storms) and Cape Hatteras Secondary School of Coastal Studies, a combination middle school and high school (home of the Hurricanes) newly rebuilt in 2007 on the NC 12 site of the original Cape Hatteras Elementary and Cape Hatteras Secondary Schools, in Buxton. Both schools are part of the Dare County Schools district.

== Climate ==
According to the Trewartha climate classification system, Buxton, North Carolina has a humid subtropical climate with hot and humid summers, cool winters and year-around precipitation (Cfak). Cfak climates are characterized by all months having an average mean temperature > 32.0 °F (> 0.0 °C), at least eight months with an average mean temperature ≥ 50.0 °F (≥ 10.0 °C), at least one month with an average mean temperature ≥ 71.6 °F (≥ 22.0 °C) and no significant precipitation difference between seasons. During the summer months in Buxton, a cooling afternoon sea breeze is present on most days, but episodes of extreme heat and humidity can occur with heat index values ≥ 100 °F (≥ 38 °C).

Buxton is prone to hurricane strikes, particularly during the Atlantic hurricane season which extends from June 1 through November 30, sharply peaking from late August through September. During the winter months, episodes of cold and wind can occur with wind chill values < 15 °F (< −9 °C). The plant hardiness zone in Buxton is 8b with an average annual extreme minimum air temperature of 19.3 °F (−7.1 °C). The average seasonal (Dec-Mar) snowfall total is < 2 inches (< 5 cm).

Climate data for Buxton, NC (1981-2010 Averages)
Month	Jan	Feb	Mar	Apr	May	Jun	Jul	Aug	Sep	Oct	Nov	Dec	Year
Mean daily maximum °F (°C)	52.6 (11.4)	54.1 (12.3)	59.1 (15.1)	66.5 (19.2)	73.6 (23.1)	80.9 (27.2)	84.5 (29.2)	84.0 (28.9)	80.3 (26.8)	72.4 (22.4)	64.4 (18.0)	56.5 (13.6)	69.1 (20.6)
Daily mean °F (°C)	45.8 (7.7)	47.2 (8.4)	52.1 (11.2)	59.8 (15.4)	67.5 (19.7)	75.4 (24.1)	79.3 (26.3)	78.9 (26.1)	75.0 (23.9)	66.5 (19.2)	58.1 (14.5)	49.9 (9.9)	63.0 (17.2)
Mean daily minimum °F (°C)	39.0 (3.9)	40.3 (4.6)	45.1 (7.3)	53.1 (11.7)	61.3 (16.3)	70.0 (21.1)	74.2 (23.4)	73.8 (23.2)	69.7 (20.9)	60.7 (15.9)	51.9 (11.1)	43.3 (6.3)	56.9 (13.8)
Average precipitation inches (mm)	5.11 (130)	3.90 (99)	4.63 (118)	3.80 (97)	3.63 (92)	4.01 (102)	4.89 (124)	6.75 (171)	6.26 (159)	5.07 (129)	4.77 (121)	4.15 (105)	56.97 (1,447)
Average relative humidity (%)	72.0	71.3	70.0	70.5	73.4	77.0	78.9	77.6	75.2	71.8	73.6	71.9	73.6
Average dew point °F (°C)	37.3 (2.9)	38.4 (3.6)	42.6 (5.9)	50.2 (10.1)	58.7 (14.8)	67.7 (19.8)	72.2 (22.3)	71.3 (21.8)	66.6 (19.2)	57.1 (13.9)	49.7 (9.8)	41.2 (5.1)	54.5 (12.5)
Source: PRISM

Climate data for Cape Hatteras, NC Ocean Water Temperature (6 S Buxton)
Month	Jan	Feb	Mar	Apr	May	Jun	Jul	Aug	Sep	Oct	Nov	Dec	Year
Daily mean °F (°C)	49 (9)	46 (8)	52 (11)	59 (15)	68 (20)	74 (23)	78 (26)	80 (27)	77 (25)	70 (21)	58 (14)	55 (13)	64 (18)
Source: NOAA

== Ecology ==
According to the A. W. Kuchler U.S. potential natural vegetation types, Buxton, North Carolina would have a dominant vegetation type of Live oak/Sea Oats Uniola paniculata (90) with a dominant vegetation form of Coastal Prairie (20).

Preceded by Avon	Beaches of The Outer Banks	Succeeded by Cape Hatteras
