= Salvo, North Carolina =

- Census-designated place

- Location in Dare County and the state of North Carolina.
- Coordinates: 35°32′56″N 75°28′8″W
- Country: United States
- State: North Carolina
- County: Dare
- Named for: Artillery discharge following the American Civil War

Area
  - Total: 0.97 sq mi (2.51 km^{2})
  - Land: 0.97 sq mi (2.51 km^{2})
  - Water: 0 sq mi (0.00 km^{2})
- Elevation: 3 ft (0.91 m)

Population (2020)
  - Total: 303
  - Density: 312.8/sq mi (120.78/km^{2})
- Time zone: UTC-5 (Eastern (EST))
  - Summer (DST): UTC-4 (EST)
- ZIP code: 27972
- FIPS code: 37-58940
- GNIS feature ID: 2628655

Salvo is a census-designated place located in Dare County, North Carolina, United States, on Hatteras Island, part of North Carolina's Outer Banks. As of the 2020 census, Salvo had a population of 303. Originally (with Rodanthe and Waves) part of the settlement of Chicamacomico, Salvo was originally known as "Clarks" or "Clarksville."

The name "Salvo" allegedly stems from the American Civil War, during which a passing Union vessel spotted the settlement, which was not marked on their maps. The commanding officer ordered an attack, and a sailor marked the site on his map with the word "Salvo." The name was formally given to the town when it received a post office in 1901. The Salvo post office, ZIP code 27972, one of the smallest postal facilities in the United States, was damaged by an arsonist in 1992. A new post office was constructed later in the decade for all of Chicamacomico. Hurricane Irene in August 2011 damaged much of the Outer Banks area including Salvo.

The residents of Salvo are governed by the Dare County Board of Commissioners. Salvo is part of District 4, along with Avon, Buxton, Frisco, Hatteras, Rodanthe and Waves.

On June 24, 2014, a Virginia vacationer became buried alive in beach sand when trying to dig a tunnel, and then died.

Salvo Post Office was listed on the National Register of Historic Places in 1993.

== Demographics ==
Historical population
Census	Pop.	Note	%±
2020	303		—
U.S. Decennial Census

=== 2020 census ===
Salvo racial composition
Race	Number	Percentage
White (non-Hispanic)	274	90.43%
Black or African American (non-Hispanic)	4	1.32%
Native American	2	0.66%
Asian	1	0.33%
Other/Mixed	14	4.62%
Hispanic or Latino	8	2.64%

As of the 2020 United States census, there were 303 people, 43 households, and 35 families residing in the CDP.

== Climate ==
According to the Trewartha climate classification system, Salvo, North Carolina has a humid subtropical climate with hot and humid summers, cool winters and year-around precipitation (Cfak). Cfak climates are characterized by all months having an average mean temperature > 32.0 °F (> 0.0 °C), at least eight months with an average mean temperature ≥ 50.0 °F (≥ 10.0 °C), at least one month with an average mean temperature ≥ 71.6 °F (≥ 22.0 °C) and no significant precipitation difference between seasons. During the summer months in Salvo, a cooling afternoon sea breeze is present on most days, but episodes of extreme heat and humidity can occur with heat index values ≥ 100 °F (≥ 38 °C). Salvo is prone to hurricane strikes, particularly during the Atlantic hurricane season which extends from June 1 through November 30, sharply peaking from late August through September. During the winter months, episodes of cold and wind can occur with wind chill values < 10 °F (< -12 °C). The plant hardiness zone in Salvo is 8b with an average annual extreme minimum air temperature of 17.2 °F (-8.2 °C). The average seasonal (Dec-Mar) snowfall total is < 2 inches (< 5 cm), and the average annual peak in nor'easter activity is in February.

Climate data for Salvo, NC (1981-2010 Averages)
Month	Jan	Feb	Mar	Apr	May	Jun	Jul	Aug	Sep	Oct	Nov	Dec	Year
Mean daily maximum °F (°C)	53.1 (11.7)	54.7 (12.6)	59.4 (15.2)	66.4 (19.1)	73.4 (23.0)	80.6 (27.0)	84.2 (29.0)	83.8 (28.8)	80.0 (26.7)	72.2 (22.3)	64.6 (18.1)	56.9 (13.8)	69.2 (20.7)
Daily mean °F (°C)	46.2 (7.9)	47.6 (8.7)	52.4 (11.3)	59.8 (15.4)	67.3 (19.6)	75.4 (24.1)	79.3 (26.3)	78.8 (26.0)	75.0 (23.9)	66.6 (19.2)	58.5 (14.7)	50.3 (10.2)	63.2 (17.3)
Mean daily minimum °F (°C)	39.3 (4.1)	40.6 (4.8)	45.4 (7.4)	53.3 (11.8)	61.3 (16.3)	70.2 (21.2)	74.3 (23.5)	73.8 (23.2)	70.0 (21.1)	61.0 (16.1)	52.3 (11.3)	43.6 (6.4)	57.2 (14.0)
Average precipitation inches (mm)	4.61 (117)	3.81 (97)	4.16 (106)	3.49 (89)	3.69 (94)	4.17 (106)	5.16 (131)	6.40 (163)	5.99 (152)	4.44 (113)	4.19 (106)	3.93 (100)	54.04 (1,373)
Average relative humidity (%)	70.1	69.7	68.4	70.0	73.1	76.5	78.4	77.3	74.4	71.0	72.0	70.3	72.6
Average dew point °F (°C)	37.0 (2.8)	38.2 (3.4)	42.3 (5.7)	50.0 (10.0)	58.4 (14.7)	67.5 (19.7)	72.0 (22.2)	71.1 (21.7)	66.3 (19.1)	56.9 (13.8)	49.5 (9.7)	41.0 (5.0)	54.3 (12.4)
Source: PRISM

Climate data for Cape Hatteras, NC Ocean Water Temperature (25 S Salvo)
Month	Jan	Feb	Mar	Apr	May	Jun	Jul	Aug	Sep	Oct	Nov	Dec	Year
Daily mean °F (°C)	49 (9)	46 (8)	52 (11)	59 (15)	68 (20)	74 (23)	78 (26)	80 (27)	77 (25)	70 (21)	58 (14)	55 (13)	64 (18)
Source: NOAA

== Ecology ==
According to the A. W. Kuchler U.S. potential natural vegetation types, Salvo, North Carolina would have a dominant vegetation type of live oak/sea oats (Uniola paniculata) (90) with a dominant vegetation form of Coastal Prairie (20).

== Education ==
Residents are zoned to Dare County Schools. Zoned schools are Cape Hatteras Elementary School and Cape Hatteras Secondary School.

Preceded by Waves	Beaches of The Outer Banks	Succeeded by Avon
