= Waves, North Carolina =

- Census-designated place
- Location in Dare County and the state of North Carolina
- Coordinates: 35°34′0″N 75°28′6″W
- Country: United States
- State: North Carolina
- County: Dare
- Named for: Wind waves

Area
  - Total: 0.69 sq mi (1.78 km^{2})
  - Land: 0.68 sq mi (1.75 km^{2})
  - Water: 0.012 sq mi (0.03 km^{2})
- Elevation: 5 ft (1.5 m)

Population (2020)
  - Total: 172
  - Density: 254.8/sq mi (98.38/km^{2})
- Time zone: UTC-5 (Eastern (EST))
  - Summer (DST): UTC-4 (EST)
- ZIP code: 27982
- FIPS code: 37-71440
- GNIS feature ID: 1023135

Waves is an unincorporated community and census-designated place (CDP) in Dare County, North Carolina, United States. It is on Hatteras Island, part of North Carolina's Outer Banks. As of the 2020 census, Waves had a population of 172. Waves, along with Rodanthe and Salvo, are part of the settlement of Chicamacomico.

The residents of Waves are governed by the Dare County Board of Commissioners. Waves is part of District 4, along with Avon, Buxton, Frisco, Hatteras, Rodanthe and Salvo.

== Demographics ==
Historical population
Census	Pop.	Note	%±
2020	172		—
U.S. Decennial Census

=== 2020 census ===
Waves racial composition
Race	Number	Percentage
White (non-Hispanic)	169	98.26%
Black or African American (non-Hispanic)	1	0.58%
Other/Mixed	1	0.58%
Hispanic or Latino	1	0.58%

As of the 2020 United States census, there were 172 people, 24 households, and 13 families residing in the CDP.

== History ==
The community was so named on account of waves at the beach.

The Rasmus Midgett House was listed on the National Register of Historic Places in 2009.

== Boundaries ==
The northern border of Waves is generally considered to be the ditch that runs under Highway 12 just south of Resort Rodanthe Drive. The southern border, separating Waves and Salvo, is more ambiguous. Long-time residents indicate various "official lines" separating the two. Formerly Rodanthe, Waves and Salvo were each served by their own post office. Today a single post office, located in Waves, serves the entire community and the former lines that separated the communities have become blurred.

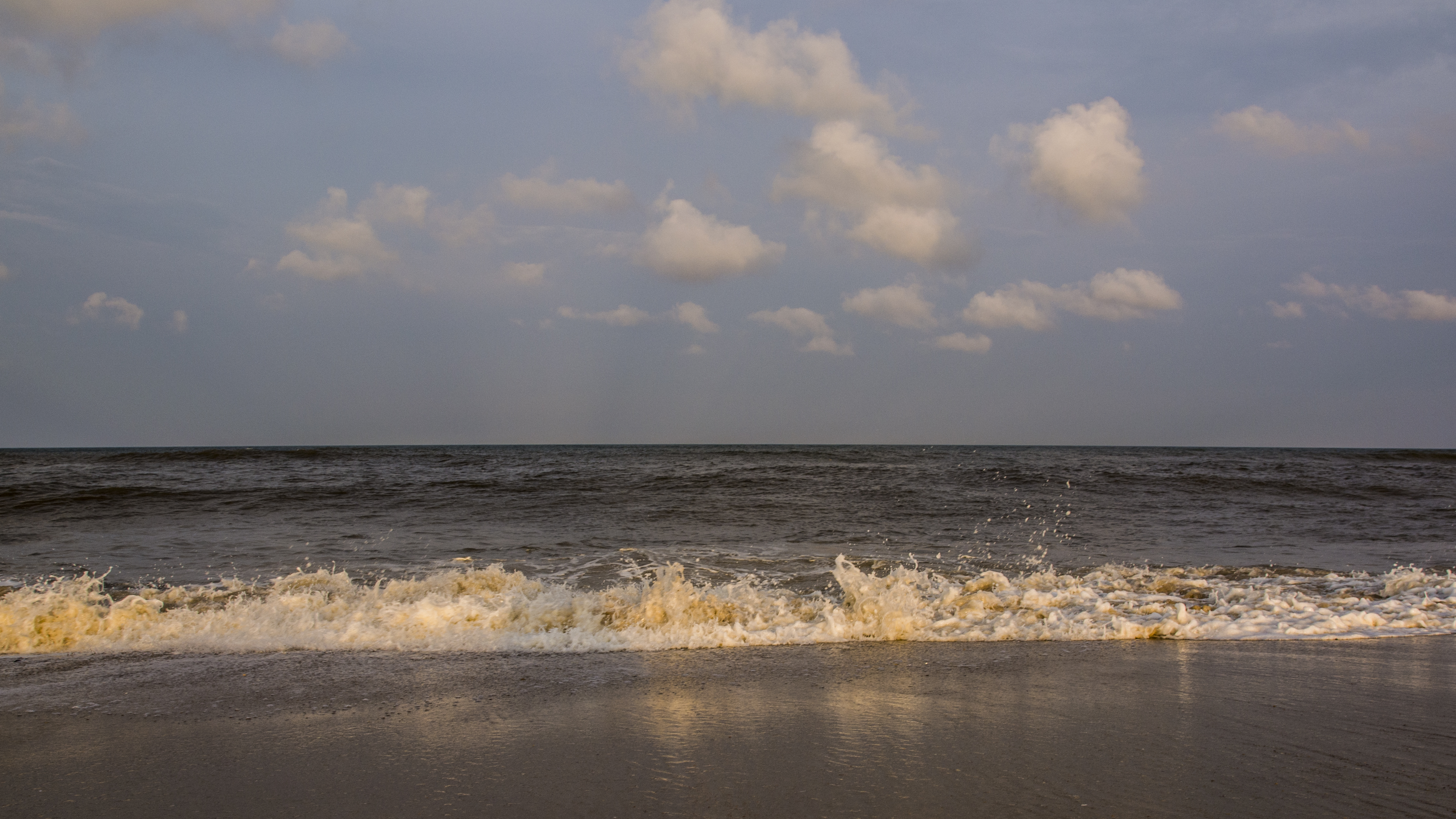
The beach at Waves

== Economy ==
The Waves area is dominated by campgrounds both large and small as well as numerous rental houses.

== Climate ==
According to the Trewartha climate classification system, Waves, North Carolina has a humid subtropical climate with hot and humid summers, cool winters and year-around precipitation (Cfak). Cfak climates are characterized by all months having an average mean temperature > 32.0 °F (> 0.0 °C), at least eight months with an average mean temperature ≥ 50.0 °F (≥ 10.0 °C), at least one month with an average mean temperature ≥ 71.6 °F (≥ 22.0 °C) and no significant precipitation difference between seasons. During the summer months in Waves, a cooling afternoon sea breeze is present on most days, but episodes of extreme heat and humidity can occur with heat index values ≥ 100 °F (≥ 38 °C). Waves is prone to hurricane strikes, particularly during the Atlantic hurricane season which extends from June 1 through November 30, sharply peaking from late August through September. During the winter months, episodes of cold and wind can occur with wind chill values < 10 °F (< -12 °C). The plant hardiness zone in Waves is 8b with an average annual extreme minimum air temperature of 17.2 °F (-8.2 °C). The average seasonal (Dec-Mar) snowfall total is < 2 inches (< 5 cm), and the average annual peak in nor'easter activity is in February.

Climate data for Waves, NC (1981-2010 Averages)
Month	Jan	Feb	Mar	Apr	May	Jun	Jul	Aug	Sep	Oct	Nov	Dec	Year
Mean daily maximum °F (°C)	53.2 (11.8)	54.8 (12.7)	59.5 (15.3)	66.2 (19.0)	73.2 (22.9)	80.4 (26.9)	84.0 (28.9)	83.6 (28.7)	79.7 (26.5)	72.1 (22.3)	64.7 (18.2)	57.0 (13.9)	69.1 (20.6)
Daily mean °F (°C)	46.3 (7.9)	47.7 (8.7)	52.5 (11.4)	59.8 (15.4)	67.3 (19.6)	75.3 (24.1)	79.2 (26.2)	78.7 (25.9)	74.9 (23.8)	66.6 (19.2)	58.5 (14.7)	50.3 (10.2)	63.2 (17.3)
Mean daily minimum °F (°C)	39.4 (4.1)	40.6 (4.8)	45.4 (7.4)	53.3 (11.8)	61.4 (16.3)	70.3 (21.3)	74.5 (23.6)	73.9 (23.3)	70.1 (21.2)	61.0 (16.1)	52.3 (11.3)	43.7 (6.5)	57.2 (14.0)
Average precipitation inches (mm)	4.57 (116)	3.81 (97)	4.11 (104)	3.46 (88)	3.70 (94)	4.19 (106)	5.18 (132)	6.37 (162)	5.98 (152)	4.39 (112)	4.14 (105)	3.92 (100)	53.82 (1,367)
Average relative humidity (%)	69.9	69.5	67.9	70.0	73.1	76.8	78.9	77.6	74.6	70.7	71.7	70.0	72.6
Average dew point °F (°C)	37.0 (2.8)	38.2 (3.4)	42.2 (5.7)	50.0 (10.0)	58.4 (14.7)	67.5 (19.7)	72.1 (22.3)	71.1 (21.7)	66.3 (19.1)	56.8 (13.8)	49.4 (9.7)	40.9 (4.9)	54.2 (12.3)
Source: PRISM

Climate data for Cape Hatteras, NC Ocean Water Temperature (27 S Waves)
Month	Jan	Feb	Mar	Apr	May	Jun	Jul	Aug	Sep	Oct	Nov	Dec	Year
Daily mean °F (°C)	49 (9)	46 (8)	52 (11)	59 (15)	68 (20)	74 (23)	78 (26)	80 (27)	77 (25)	70 (21)	58 (14)	55 (13)	64 (18)
Source: NOAA

== Ecology ==
According to the A. W. Kuchler U.S. potential natural vegetation types, Waves, North Carolina would have a dominant vegetation type of Live oak/Sea Oats Uniola paniculata (90) with a dominant vegetation form of Coastal Prairie (20).

== Education ==
Residents are zoned to Dare County Schools. Zoned schools are Cape Hatteras Elementary School and Cape Hatteras Secondary School.

Preceded by Rodanthe	Beaches of The Outer Banks	Succeeded by Salvo
