= Chicamacomico Life-Saving Station =

- Chicamacomico Life Saving Station
- U.S. National Register of Historic Places
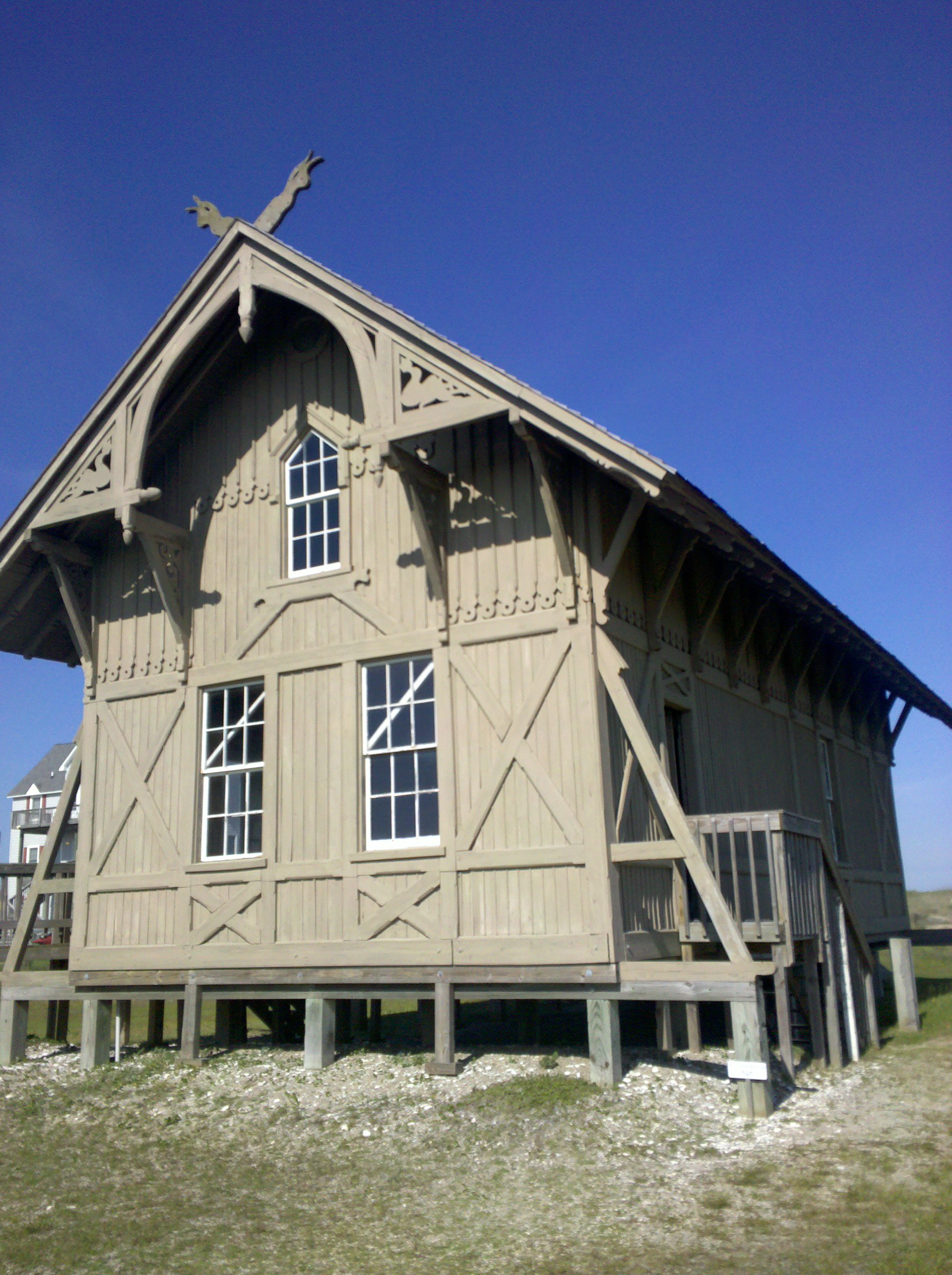
- The 1874 station.

- Location within North Carolina Location within the United States
- Location: NC 12 and SR 1247, Rodanthe, North Carolina
- Coordinates: 35°35′42″N 75°27′54″W
- Area: 10 acres (4.0 ha)
- Built: 1874
- NRHP reference No.: 76000164
- Added to NRHP: December 12, 1976

The Chicamacomico Life-Saving Station (/ˌtʃɪkəməˈkɒmɪkoʊ/; CLSS) is a former station of the United States Life-Saving Service and United States Coast Guard. It is located in Rodanthe, North Carolina, on Hatteras Island in the Outer Banks, on the east side of what is today Highway 12. Today, the surviving buildings of the station form a museum.

== History ==
After the U.S. Life-Saving Service and the United States Revenue Cutter Service merged in January 1915 to create the U.S. Coast Guard, Chicamacomico became a U.S. Coast Guard facility. Under Coast Guard control, it remained active until 1954. After its decommissioning the facility was transformed into a museum.

The CLSS is perhaps best remembered for the 1918 rescue of the British tanker Mirlo on August 16 1918. Mirlo was struck by a German torpedo fired by U117, about 5 miles offshore during World War I. Forty-two crew members of the Mirlo were saved from the burning tanker by Keeper John Allen Midgett Jr. and his crew; Numerous accolades and awards were bestowed upon the 6 life-savers including gold medals in their honor presented by King George V of the United Kingdom and the Grand Cross of the American Cross of Honor. To date only eleven Grand Cross of the American Cross of Honor awards have been bestowed in the history of the United States with six being bestowed upon the members of the CLSS.

Today, Chicamacomico forms the most complete USLSS site in the nation, and still presents the reenactment of the historic Beach Apparatus Drill every Thursday during summer tourist season. This drill includes firing the historic Lyle Gun and rescuing a live victim from the simulated ship wreck.
