= Hatteras Weather Bureau Station =

- U.S. National Register of Historic Places
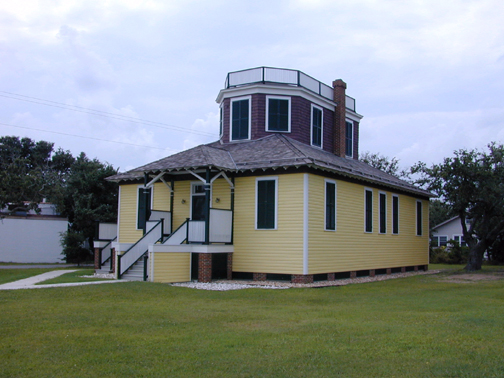

- Location within North Carolina Location within the United States
- Location: Off NC 12, Hatteras, North Carolina
- Coordinates: 35°13′12″N 75°41′26″W
- Area: 0.4 acres (0.16 ha)
- Built: 1901
- NRHP reference No.: 78000268
- Added to NRHP: February 17, 1978

The Hatteras Weather Bureau Station is a wood-frame building in Hatteras, North Carolina built in 1901 for what was then called the U.S. Weather Bureau. The then-remote location on the Outer Banks of North Carolina provided data on conditions in the Atlantic Ocean from a fixed location that was farther into the ocean environment than any on the Atlantic coast. The building served as a weather station from 1902 to 1946, when it was converted to living quarters for Weather Bureau personnel. In 1952 the property was turned over to the U.S. Coast Guard, which used it until 1958, when it was transferred to the National Park Service for use by Cape Hatteras National Seashore. From 1958 to 1976 the building was used as a research station, first by Duke University and later by North Carolina State University for investigations concerning marine invertebrates.

It was listed on the National Register of Historic Places in 1978.
