= Dare County Board of Commissioners =

Local governing body in North Carolina, US

The Dare County Board of Commissioners is the governing body of Dare County, North Carolina. It operates like a county commission. It has seven seats held by elected officials called County Commissioners. The Commissioners are elected at large in countywide elections and serve four-year staggered terms. The Board elects a chairman and vice-chair for a one-year term at its organizational meeting in December.

The Board has countywide responsibility for educational funding, libraries, Parks and Recreation, and tax assessment. The Board is the sole governing body for the unincorporated areas of Dare County including Colington, Martin's Point, Manns Harbor, Stumpy Point, East Lake, Wanchese, northern Roanoke Island, and all of Hatteras Island. In these areas, the county is responsible for planning and zoning, solid waste management, and law enforcement.

== Districts ==
- District 1: East Lake, Stumpy Point, Manns Harbor, Manteo, Wanchese
- District 2: Kill Devil Hills, Colington, Nags Head
- District 3: Duck, Southern Shores, Kitty Hawk
- District 4: Rodanthe, Waves, Salvo, Avon, Buxton, Frisco, Hatteras

== Meetings ==
The Board meets on the first Monday of the month at 9:00 AM and the third Monday of each month at 5:00 PM at the Dare County Administrative Annex located at 954 Marshall C. Collins Drive in Manteo.

== Issues ==
In 2008, the Board adopted a resolution making English the official language of Dare County. Jack Shea crafted the resolution. The Commissioners voting for the resolution were Jack Shea, Richard Johnson, Mike Johnson and Max Dutton. Dissenting Commissioners were Warren Judge, Allen Burrus and Virginia Tillett.

== List of Dare County Boards of Commissioners ==
=== 2014 Board ===
- Chairman: Warren Judge (District 3: Kitty Hawk, Duck, Southern Shores)
- Vice Chairman: Allen Burrus (District 4: Chicamacomico, Avon, Buxton, Frisco, Hatteras)
- Commissioner: Wally Overman (District 1: Roanoke Island, Dare County Mainland)
- Commissioner: Virginia Tillett (District 1: Roanoke Island, Dare County Mainland)
- Commissioner: Max Dutton (District 2: Nags Head, Colington, Kill Devil Hills)
- Commissioner: Jack Shea (District 5 At Large)
- Commissioner: Robert Woodard (District 2: Nags Head, Colington, Kill Devil Hills)

=== 2011 Board ===
Chairman: Warren Judge

Vice Chairman: Allen Burrus

District	Name	Party	Year First Elected	Present Term Ends
1	Richard Johnson	Republican	1996	2012
1	Virginia Tillett	Democratic	2002	2014
2	Mike Johnson	Republican	2004	2012
2	Max Dutton	Democratic	2006	2014
3	Warren Judge	Democratic	2000	2012
4	Allen Burrus	Democratic	2008	2012
5	Jack Shea	Republican	2006	2014

Allen Burrus was appointed to the Board in February 2006 to fill the remaining term of Joseph "Mac" Midgett who died in Jan 2006. Burrus was then elected to the seat in 2008.

=== 2010 Election ===
All incumbent Commissioners ran for re-election in 2010.

- Virginia Tillett in District 1 ran unopposed and was re-elected.
- Max Dutton in District 2 ran unopposed and was re-elected.
- Jack Shea, in District 5 (at-large District) was challenged by Robin Mann. Shea won re-election 53/47.

=== 2006 Election ===
- Max Dutton was elected in 2006 in an upset over incumbent Chairman Stan White, 52% to 48% in the Primary. He was unopposed in the General Election.
- Jack Shea was unopposed in the primary. He defeated Rex Tillett in the general election. Tillett is the nephew of North Carolina State Senator Marc Basnight.
- Virginia Tillett won the primary over two challengers, Robin Mann and Sybil Daniels Ross. She defeated John M. Robbins, III in the general election.
