= Ellsworth and Lovie Ballance House =

Historic house in North Carolina, United States

- U.S. National Register of Historic Places
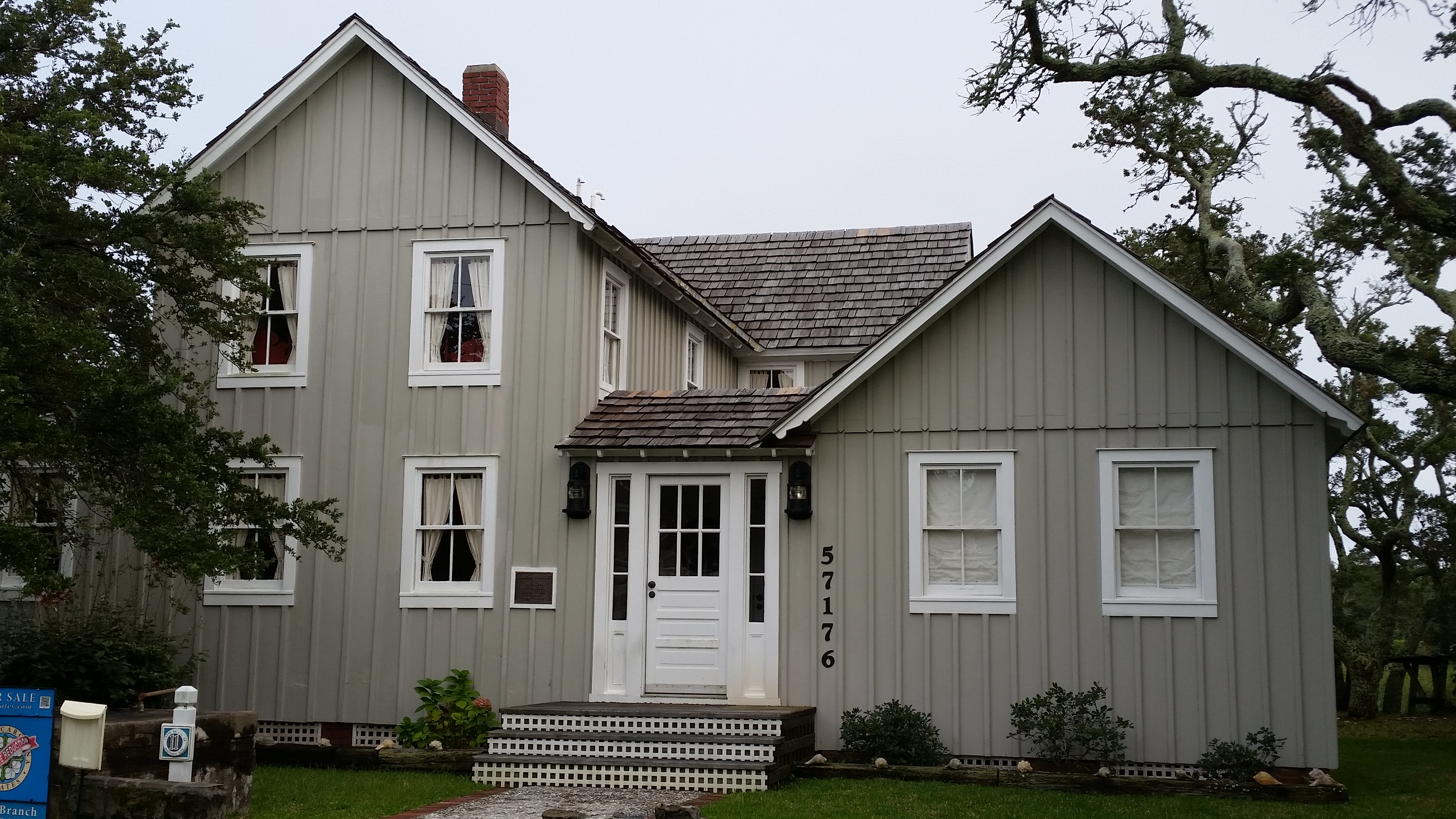

- Location within North Carolina Location within the United States
- Location: E side M.V. Australia Ln., 0.1 mi. S of Stowe Landing Rd., Hatteras, North Carolina
- Coordinates: 35°13′21″N 75°41′13″W
- Area: less than one acre
- Built: c. 1915
- Architectural style: two story T-plan
- NRHP reference No.: 01000558
- Added to NRHP: May 25, 2001

Ellsworth and Lovie Ballance House is a historic home located at Hatteras, Dare County, North Carolina. It was built about 1915, and is a two-story, three-bay, T-shaped frame dwelling. It sits on a brick pier foundation and has board-and-batten siding. The front facade features a hipped roof front porch. It is an example of a characteristic Hatteras house form.

It was listed on the National Register of Historic Places in 2001.
