= Avon, North Carolina =

- Census-designated place
- Welcome to Avon Sign

- Location in Dare County and the state of North Carolina

- Location in the United States
- Coordinates: 35°21′7″N 75°30′39″W
- Country: United States
- State: North Carolina
- County: Dare

Area
  - Total: 2.36 sq mi (6.11 km^{2})
  - Land: 2.27 sq mi (5.88 km^{2})
  - Water: 0.089 sq mi (0.23 km^{2})
- Elevation: 20 ft (6.1 m)

Population (2020)
  - Total: 832
  - Density: 366.4/sq mi (141.46/km^{2})
- Time zone: UTC-5 (Eastern (EST))
  - Summer (DST): UTC-4 (EDT)
- ZIP code: 27915
- Area code: 252
- FIPS code: 37-02780
- GNIS feature ID: 1018881

Avon is an unincorporated community located on Hatteras Island on the Outer Banks of North Carolina. Avon is a census-designated place (CDP) in Dare County. As of the 2020 census, it had a population of 832.

== Geography ==
Avon is located on Hatteras Island, part of the chain of barrier islands forming North Carolina's Outer Banks. The community lies between Salvo to the north and Buxton to the south, with Cape Hatteras National Seashore land separating it from both villages.

According to the U.S. Census Bureau, the Avon CDP has a total area of approximately 2.36 square miles (6.11 km^{2}), of which 2.27 square miles (5.88 km^{2}) is land and 0.09 square miles (0.23 km^{2}), or 3.72%, is water. Avon is bordered to the east by the Atlantic Ocean and to the west by Pamlico Sound.

=== Terrain ===
The environment forms part of the larger barrier-island landscape of Cape Hatteras National Seashore, where beaches, dunes, marshes and woodlands occur across the narrow islands.

== Climate ==
Weather data including aveage monthly temperatures, precipation and snowfall including monthly weather normals are recorded by NOAA's Cape Hatteras Airport weather station located at the Cape Hatteras Billy Micthell Field near Frisco on Hatteras Island. The NOAA station ID is USW00093729.

According to the Trewartha climate classification system, Avon, North Carolina has a humid subtropical climate with hot and humid summers, cool winters and year-around precipitation (Cfak). Cfak climates are characterized by all months having an average mean temperature > 32.0 °F (> 0.0 °C), at least eight months with an average mean temperature ≥ 50.0 °F (≥ 10.0 °C), at least one month with an average mean temperature ≥ 71.6 °F (≥ 22.0 °C) and no significant precipitation difference between seasons.

During the summer months in Avon, a cooling afternoon sea breeze is present on most days, but episodes of extreme heat and humidity can occur with heat index values ≥ 100 °F (≥ 38 °C). Avon is prone to hurricane strikes, particularly during the Atlantic hurricane season which extends from June 1 through November 30, sharply peaking from late August through September. During the winter months, episodes of cold and wind can occur with wind chill values < 15 °F (< −9 °C). The plant hardiness zone in Avon is 8b with an average annual extreme minimum air temperature of 18.5 °F (−7.5 °C). The average seasonal (Dec-Mar) snowfall total is < 2 inches (< 5 cm), and the average annual peak in nor'easter activity is in February.

Subtropical Storm Josephine reaches the shores of Avon, NC on Hatteras island. October 21, 2026

Climate data for Billy Mitchell Airstrip, near Avon (1991–2020 normals)
Month	Jan	Feb	Mar	Apr	May	Jun	Jul	Aug	Sep	Oct	Nov	Dec	Year
Mean daily maximum °F (°C)	55.4 (13.0)	56.7 (13.7)	61.4 (16.3)	69.4 (20.8)	76.7 (24.8)	84.0 (28.9)	87.3 (30.7)	87.0 (30.6)	83.0 (28.3)	75.0 (23.9)	65.8 (18.8)	59.3 (15.2)	71.8 (22.1)
Daily mean °F (°C)	48.0 (8.9)	49.1 (9.5)	53.8 (12.1)	61.8 (16.6)	69.7 (20.9)	77.5 (25.3)	81.3 (27.4)	80.7 (27.1)	76.9 (24.9)	68.2 (20.1)	58.7 (14.8)	52.1 (11.2)	64.8 (18.2)
Mean daily minimum °F (°C)	40.6 (4.8)	41.5 (5.3)	46.2 (7.9)	54.1 (12.3)	62.7 (17.1)	70.9 (21.6)	75.3 (24.1)	74.4 (23.6)	70.8 (21.6)	61.3 (16.3)	51.5 (10.8)	44.9 (7.2)	57.9 (14.4)
Average precipitation inches (mm)	4.91 (125)	4.34 (110)	4.43 (113)	3.92 (100)	4.37 (111)	4.41 (112)	5.39 (137)	6.73 (171)	7.63 (194)	5.59 (142)	4.76 (121)	4.73 (120)	61.21 (1,555)
Source: NOAA National Centers for Environmental Information, 1991–2020 U.S. Climate Normals, station USW00093729

== History ==
=== Renaming Kinnakeet ===
Historically named “Kinnakeet”, the village opened its first post office, the Kinnakeet Post Office, in 1873. In 1883 the post office and township were renamed “Avon” by the United States Postal Service. M. C. Williams is listed as the first postmaster under the Avon name.

The name Kinnakeet remains in use today and survives officially in the name of Kinnakeet Township.

=== Native American culture ===
John White's watercolor depicting Native American fishing methods in coastal North Carolina.

Avon's historic name, Kinnakeet, is of Algonquian origin. Hatteras Island was inhabited by Algonquian-speaking Native Americans, including the Hatteras Indians, whom a National Park Service ethnohistory identifies as part of the Croatan chiefdom.

=== Historic structures ===
The U.S. Life-Saving Service constructed the Little Kinnakeet Life Saving Station in 1874, remaining active, under the Coast Guard from 1915, until decommissioned in 1954. The building is now part of the Cape Hatteras National Seashore.

== Neighorhoods ==
=== The Village ===
Historic Kinnakeet was informally divided into named areas. The northern part of the village was known as the "Norther’d" or "Spain", and the southern part as "Pot Head" or "Pothead". Areas between them included Scabbertown, Frog Marsh, Cat Ridge and Dog Ridge.

== Demographics ==
=== 2020 census ===
Avon racial composition
Race	Number	Percentage
White (non-Hispanic)	761	91.47%
Black or African American (non-Hispanic)	7	0.84%
Asian	6	0.72%
Pacific Islander	1	0.12%
Other/Mixed	24	2.88%
Hispanic or Latino	33	3.97%

As of the 2020 United States census, there were 832 people, 328 households, and 83 families residing in the CDP.

== Government ==
The residents of Avon are governed by the Dare County Board of Commissioners. Avon is part of District 4, along with Buxton, Frisco, Hatteras, Rodanthe, Waves and Salvo.

== Ecology ==
Looking west from the oceanside dunes at sunset. Milepost 54.5

According to the A. W. Kuchler U.S. potential natural vegetation types, Avon, North Carolina would have a dominant vegetation type of Live oak/Sea Oats Uniola paniculata (90) with a dominant vegetation form of Coastal Prairie (20).

== Education ==
Residents are zoned to Dare County Schools. Zoned schools are Cape Hatteras Elementary School and Cape Hatteras Secondary School.

Preceded by Salvo	Beaches of The Outer Banks	Succeeded by Buxton
