= Rasmus Midgett House =

Historic house in North Carolina, United States

- U.S. National Register of Historic Places
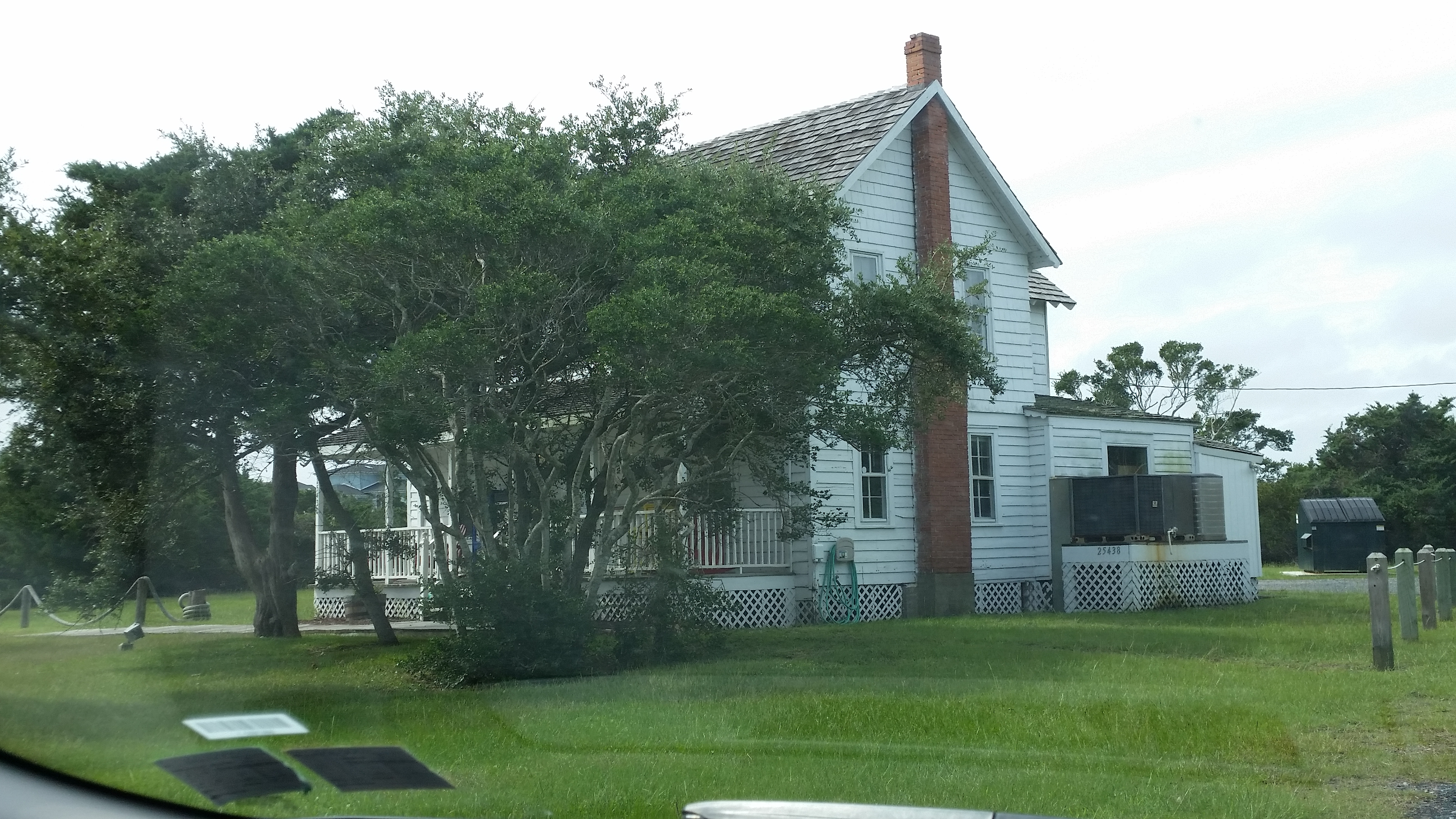

- Location within North Carolina Location within the United States
- Location: 25438 NC Hwy 12, Waves, North Carolina
- Coordinates: 35°32′42″N 75°28′19″W
- Area: 4.5 acres (1.8 ha)
- Built: c. 1855, c. 1890, c. 1915
- Architectural style: I house with ell
- NRHP reference No.: 09000847
- Added to NRHP: October 21, 2009

Rasmus Midgett House is a historic home located at Waves, Dare County, North Carolina. It was built in four phases starting about 1855. It is a two-story, three-bay, frame I-house dwelling with a two-story rear ell. It features a one-story, full-width front porch. It was moved to its present location in 1937, after being knocked off its foundation. Also on the property is a family cemetery.

It was listed on the National Register of Historic Places in 2009.
