= Hatteras Island =

Island in North Carolina, US

Nickname: Croatoan Island
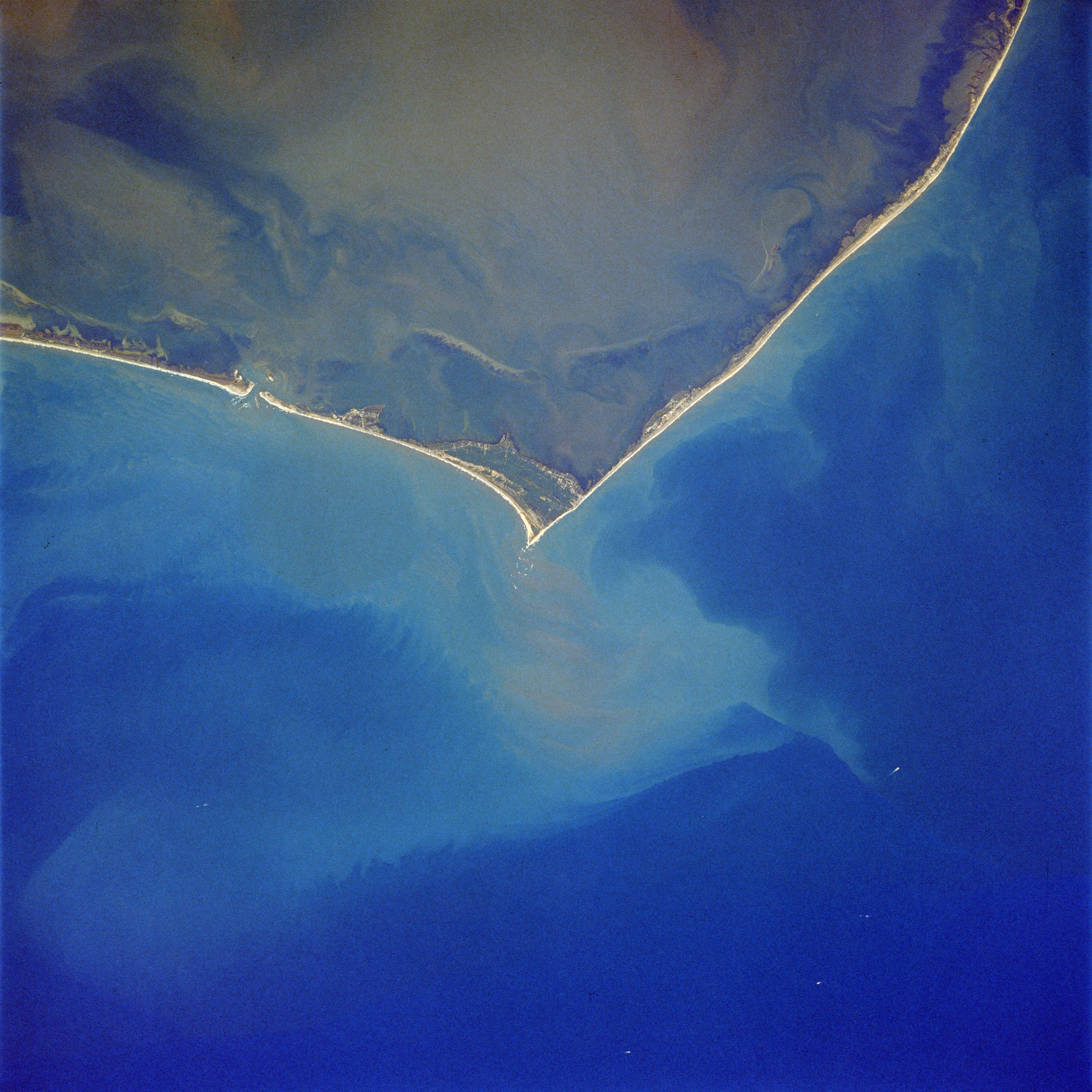
- Cape Hatteras in October 1989, displaying sediment displaced by Hurricane Hugo in September

- Location within North Carolina

Geography
- Location: Atlantic Ocean, Pamlico Sound
- Coordinates: 35°24′30″N 75°29′13″W
- Area: 85.56 km^{2} (33.03 sq mi)
- Length: 68 km (42.3 mi)

Demographics
- Population: 4,322 (2010)

Hatteras Island (historically Croatoan Island, sometimes referred to as Hatorask) is a barrier island located off the North Carolina coast. Dividing the Atlantic Ocean and the Pamlico Sound, it runs parallel to the coast, forming a bend at Cape Hatteras.

It is part of North Carolina's Outer Banks and includes the communities of Rodanthe, Waves, Salvo, Avon, Buxton, Frisco, and Hatteras. It contains the largest part of the Cape Hatteras National Seashore. At the time of European settlement, the island was inhabited by Croatoan Native Americans.

The island has a land area of 85.56 km^{2} (33.03 mi^{2}) and a population of 4,322, as of the 2010 census. It lies in parts of Kinnakeet Township and Hatteras Township in Dare County, and Ocracoke Township in Hyde County. Hatteras Island is known for sport fishing, surfing, windsurfing and kiteboarding, and Hatteras Village is known as the "Blue Marlin Capital of the World".

The island is one of the longest in the contiguous United States, measuring 42 miles (68 km) along a straight line from end to end, or roughly 50 miles (80 km) along the curve of the land. The island, because of its function as a barrier island and its low lying profile, has experienced significant coastal erosion because of sea level rise. Some sections have significantly eroded already, with portions of Hatteras Island at 25% of its original width as of 2014.

== History ==
=== Pre-Columbian era ===
The Croatoan Indians were the first human inhabitants of Hatteras Island. The Croatoans were composed of two groups: the Hatterask and the Kinnakeet. As Native Americans were often named by either their main town, their language, or by what they called themselves, Kinnakeet referred to an area on Croatoan Island (modern day Avon) as did Hatterask (modern day Frisco, not modern day Hatteras village). The central village was called Croatoan (council town, which is modern day Buxton), which is why the Native Americans and the Island were referred to by the English as Croatoans from Croatoan.

=== Colonial era ===
The story of the missing colony of Roanoke began when John White finally returned to Roanoke on a fifth voyage to the colony, a much-delayed re-supply mission arriving in 1590. At that time, the settlement was found abandoned. The only clues to the colonists' whereabouts were the letters "CRO" carved into the bark of a nearby tree and the word "Croatoan" found carved into the palisade of the fort. It is logical that the colonists left on Roanoke had gone back to Croatoan, as they had already lived there and had had a strong relationship with the natives, some of whom had visited England.

John White, who made maps showing both Croatoan and Roanoke, wrote in 1590:

I greatly joyed that I had safely found a certain token of their safe being at Croatoan, which is the place where Manteo was born, and the savages of the island our friends.

White had instructed them that if anything happened to them, they should carve a Maltese cross on a tree nearby, indicating that their disappearance had been forced. As there was no cross, White took this to mean they had moved to "Croatoan Island" (now known as Hatteras Island). Upon finding the message of CROATOAN carved on the palisade, White also wrote:

The next morning it was agreed by the captain and myself, with the master and others to weigh anchor and go for the place at Croatoan where our planters were for that then the wind was good for that place.

However, he was unable to conduct a search, as a massive storm was brewing and his men refused to go any further. The next day, they instead left the area without looking further for the colonists.

=== American Civil War ===
In the early months of the American Civil War, the inlets around Hatteras Island were used by Confederate commerce raiders as routes for attacking Union merchant shipping. The Confederates eventually built two forts on the island, Fort Hatteras and Fort Clark, to protect the inlets, but the forts had inadequate defenses. In August 1861, Union forces took control of Hatteras Island in the Battle of Hatteras Inlet Batteries.

The following October, a small Confederate force attempted to retake the island. In a two-day engagement known as the "Chicamacomico Affair" or "Chicamacomico Races", a Confederate regiment chased a Union counterpart 26 miles (42 km) along the island, only to be forced to retreat back to its boats the next day by Union reinforcements. Hatteras Island would thereafter remain in Union hands.

== Communities ==
While there are no incorporated places on Hatteras, there are several resort communities along the length of the island. From north to south these are:

- Chicamacomico is the older name for a contiguous settlement now divided into three villages. Together, they form what is known as the "tri-villages":
  - Rodanthe
  - Waves
  - Salvo
- Avon, formerly named Kinnakeet
- Buxton, the largest community by population on Hatteras Island, home to the Cape Hatteras Light as well as the elementary and secondary school that serves all residents of the island
- Frisco, location of the largest paved airstrip on the Island at Billy Mitchell Airport.
- Hatteras Village, terminus of the ferry to Ocracoke Island.

== Law enforcement ==
As there are no incorporated places on Hatteras, the island is patrolled primarily by the Dare County Sheriff's Office for general law enforcement, and the North Carolina Highway Patrol for traffic enforcement. Additionally, special subject matter law enforcement is conducted by the North Carolina Wildlife Enforcement and the North Carolina Marine Patrol. On federal lands, patrols are also conducted by the US National Park Service the US Fish and Wildlife Service, and the US Marine Patrol, along with US Coast Guard.

The Island has one Coast Guard station. The station is located adjacent to the ferry terminal, and has two 47 foot Motor Lifeboats and other small craft.

Additionally, the island has a small rescue squad that helps rescue people from the water, and help with marine safety. The rescue squad headquarters are in Buxton, North Carolina.

== Accessibility ==
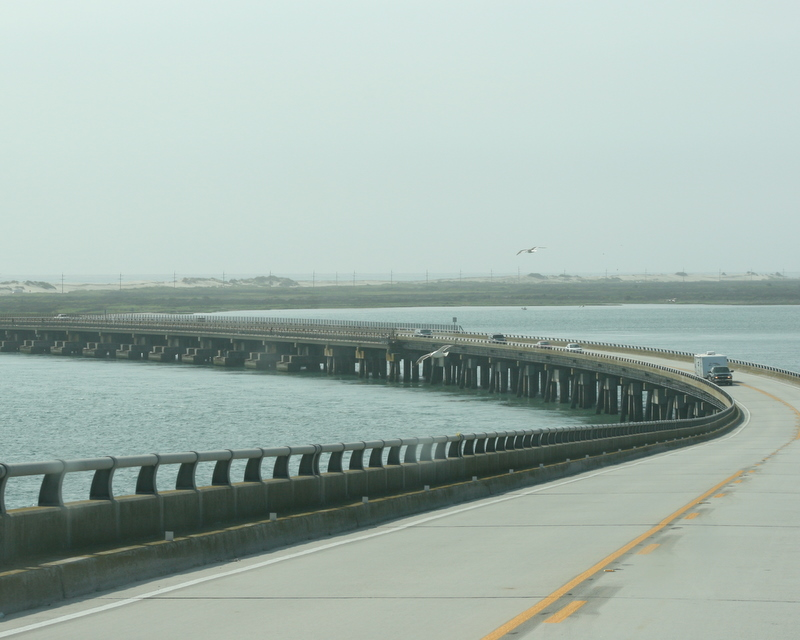
The Old Bonner Bridge

For many years, the only ways to reach Hatteras Island was by ferry and footpath.

In November 1963, the Herbert C. Bonner Bridge was completed, connecting Hatteras Island to the northern Outer Banks. The bridge's namesake, Herbert Covington Bonner, was a Democratic congressman who represented the area between 1940 and 1965. The $4 million to build the bridge was financed by the State of North Carolina, the U.S. Commerce Department, and the National Park Service.

From the south, Hatteras is reached by way of a 40-minute ride on the Ocracoke-Hatteras ferry. Presently there is no direct route linking Hatteras Island to the Hyde County mainland, resulting in a 2-3 hour commute around the Pamlico Sound.

During a storm on October 26, 1990, a fishing dredge broke loose from its mooring and destroyed part of the Herbert C. Bonner Bridge, cutting Hatteras Island's only bridge to the north. The bridge was repaired by February 1991.

In 2011, Hurricane Irene destroyed part of Highway 12 between Nags Head and Rodanthe. Until the construction of a temporary bridge in October 2011, the only way of accessing Hatteras Island was by ferry.

In March 2016, the North Carolina Department of Transportation (NCDOT) began construction of a bridge to replace the Bonner Bridge. The replacement bridge, named after Senator Marc Basnight, was opened in February 2019.

== Education ==
Residents are zoned to Dare County Schools. Zoned schools are Cape Hatteras Elementary School and Cape Hatteras Secondary School.
