= Hatteras, North Carolina =

Hatteras
- Census-designated place
- Location in Dare County and the state of North Carolina
- Coordinates: 35°13′10″N 75°41′25″W
- Country: United States of America
- State: North Carolina
- County: Dare
- Named for: Hatteras Indians

Area
  - Total: 2.47 sq mi (6.40 km^{2})
  - Land: 1.58 sq mi (4.08 km^{2})
  - Water: 0.89 sq mi (2.31 km^{2})
- Elevation: 3 ft (0.91 m)

Population (2020)
  - Total: 577
  - Density: 365.9/sq mi (141.27/km^{2})
- Time zone: UTC−5 (Eastern (EST))
  - Summer (DST): UTC−4 (EDT)
- ZIP code: 27943
- FIPS code: 37-30100

Hatteras is an unincorporated village and census-designated place (CDP) in Dare County, North Carolina, United States, on the Outer Banks island of Hatteras, at its extreme southwestern tip. As of the 2020 census, Hatteras had a population of 577. Immediately to the west of the village of Hatteras is Hatteras Inlet which separates Hatteras Island from the neighboring Ocracoke Island. North Carolina Highway 12 passes through the community linking it to Frisco to the east and Ocracoke to the west (via a ferry across Hatteras Inlet).

The residents of Hatteras are governed by the Dare County Board of Commissioners. Hatteras is part of District 4, along with Avon, Buxton, Frisco, Rodanthe, Waves and Salvo.

== Demographics ==
Historical population
Census	Pop.	Note	%±
2020	577		—
U.S. Decennial Census

=== 2020 census ===
Hatteras racial composition
Race	Number	Percentage
White (non-Hispanic)	540	93.59%
Black or African American (non-Hispanic)	2	0.35%
Native American	1	0.17%
Asian	1	0.17%
Other/Mixed	21	3.64%
Hispanic or Latino	12	2.08%

As of the 2020 United States census, there were 577 people, 207 households, and 130 families residing in the CDP.

== Attractions and recreation ==
Pamlico Sound, which separates Hatteras and Ocracoke Islands, is one of the largest estuarine systems in the world and offers a variety of fishing opportunities.

== Climate ==
Hatteras has a humid subtropical climate (Cfa). Hatteras experiences hot summers, somewhat moderated by the Atlantic Ocean, and some of the mildest winters in the state, with no month having an average low temperature below 40 °F (4.4 °C). Because of its location many miles off the coast of Mainland USA in the direct path of the gulf stream, Hatteras experiences year round low temperatures similar to the northern gulf of Florida or southern coastal Georgia, despite being much farther north.

Climate data for Hatteras, North Carolina (1981–2010 normals), (Note: Mean monthly maxima and minima (i.e. the expected highest and lowest temperature readings at any point during the year or given month) calculated based on data at said location from 1981 to 2010.)
Month	Jan	Feb	Mar	Apr	May	Jun	Jul	Aug	Sep	Oct	Nov	Dec	Year
Mean daily maximum °F (°C)	54.4 (12.4)	55.5 (13.1)	60.5 (15.8)	67.9 (19.9)	75.3 (24.1)	81.9 (27.7)	85.7 (29.8)	85.7 (29.8)	82 (28)	73.5 (23.1)	65.4 (18.6)	58 (14)	70.5 (21.4)
Mean daily minimum °F (°C)	40.6 (4.8)	42.8 (6.0)	47.4 (8.6)	55.4 (13.0)	63.5 (17.5)	71.1 (21.7)	75.1 (23.9)	74.8 (23.8)	71.2 (21.8)	62.5 (16.9)	53.5 (11.9)	45.9 (7.7)	58.7 (14.8)
Source: NOAA (North Carolina Observed Climate Normals)

== History ==
Hatteras was named after the Hatteras Indians.

Hatteras Village was cut off from the rest of the island on September 18, 2003, when Hurricane Isabel washed a 3,000-foot-wide (910 m) and 30-foot-deep (9.1 m) channel called Isabel Inlet at the north end of Hatteras village. The tear was subsequently repaired and restored by sand dredged by the Army Corps of Engineers.

The Ellsworth and Lovie Ballance House and Hatteras Weather Bureau Station are listed on the National Register of Historic Places.

== Transportation ==
Hatteras is served by Billy Mitchell Airport.

The Village is also home to the Hatteras-Ocracoke Ferry terminal which is the only way for people to access Ocracoke Island from Hatteras Village other than air travel.

== Education ==
Residents are zoned to Dare County Schools. Zoned schools are Cape Hatteras Elementary School and Cape Hatteras Secondary School. The schools are located on NC 12 in Buxton.

Dare County Library has a branch in Hatteras.

== Gallery ==
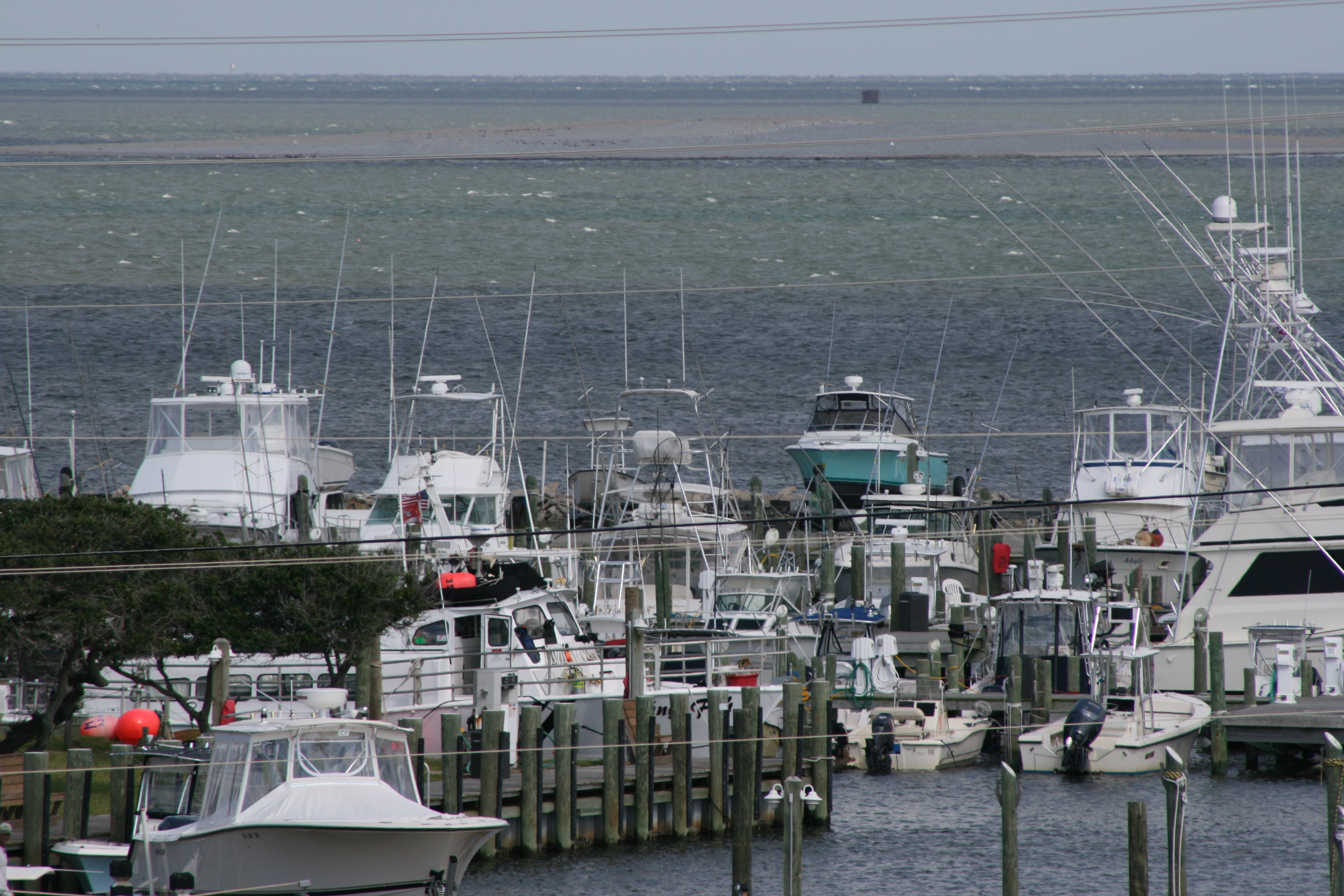
View of Pamlico Sound, near Hatteras Inlet from a home in Hatteras on a windy day in June 2007

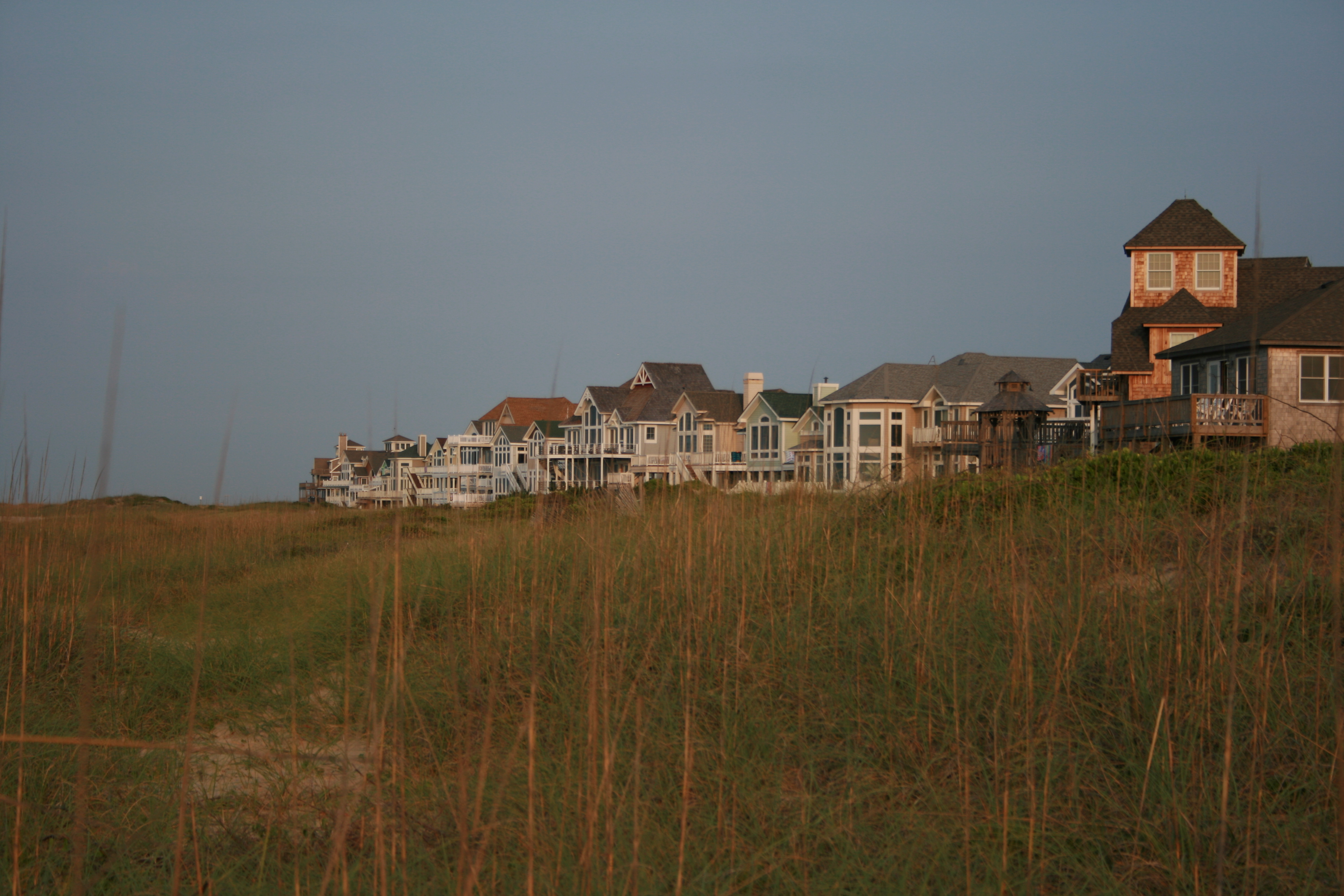
View of homes along oceanfront in Hatteras in June 2007

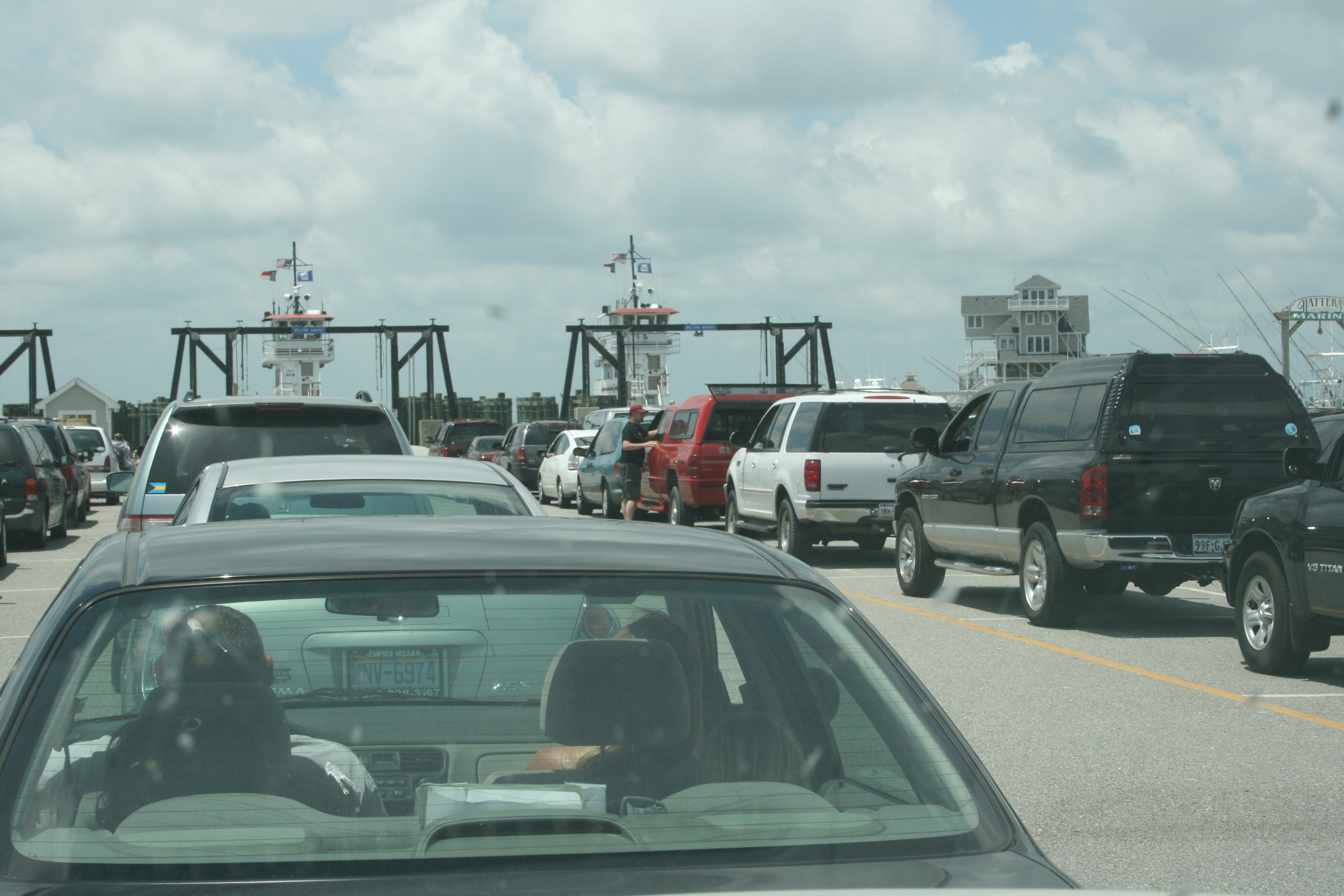
Busy Hatteras Ferry Lines on a Wednesday in June 2007

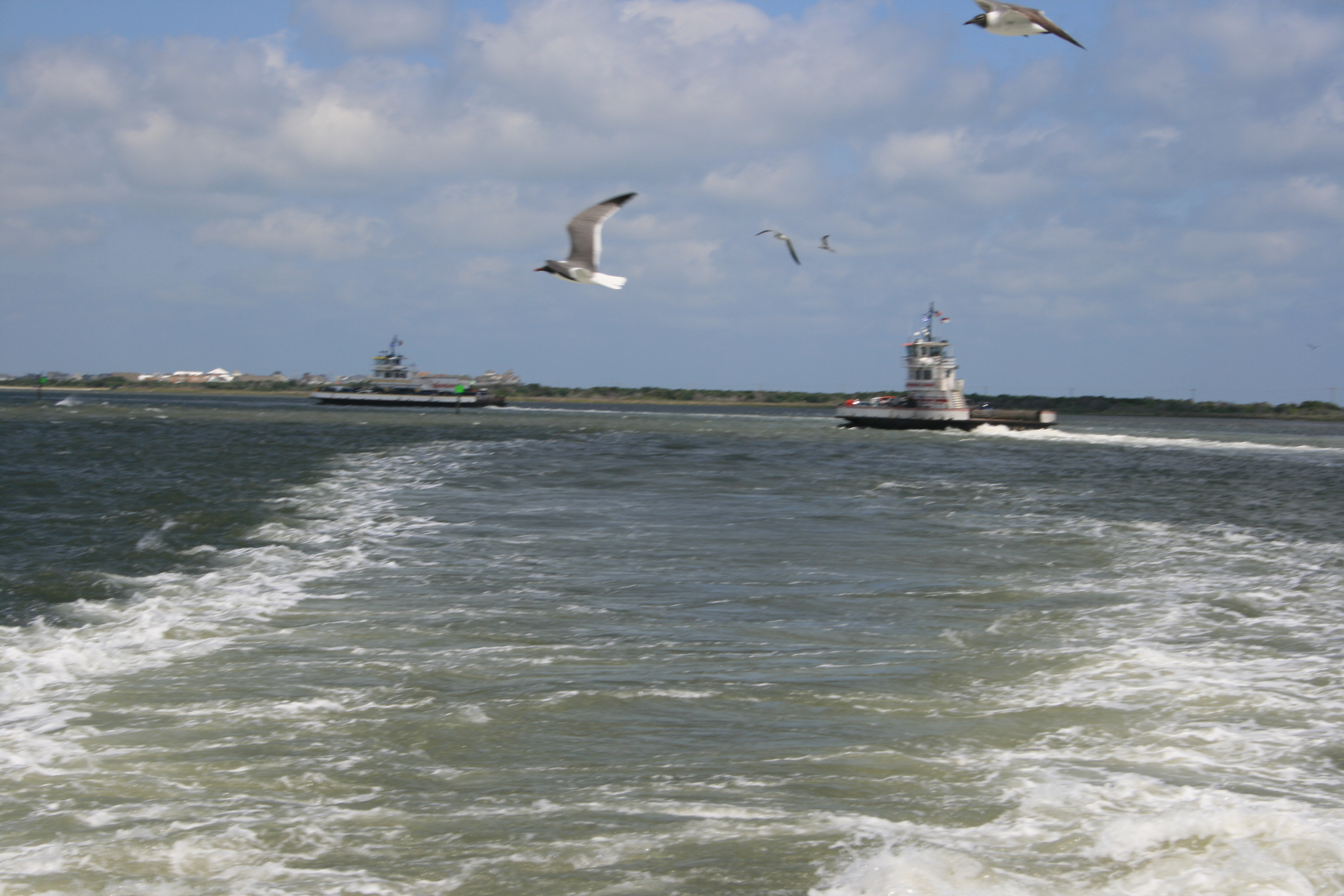
Ferries making trip from Ocracoke to Hatteras, June 2007

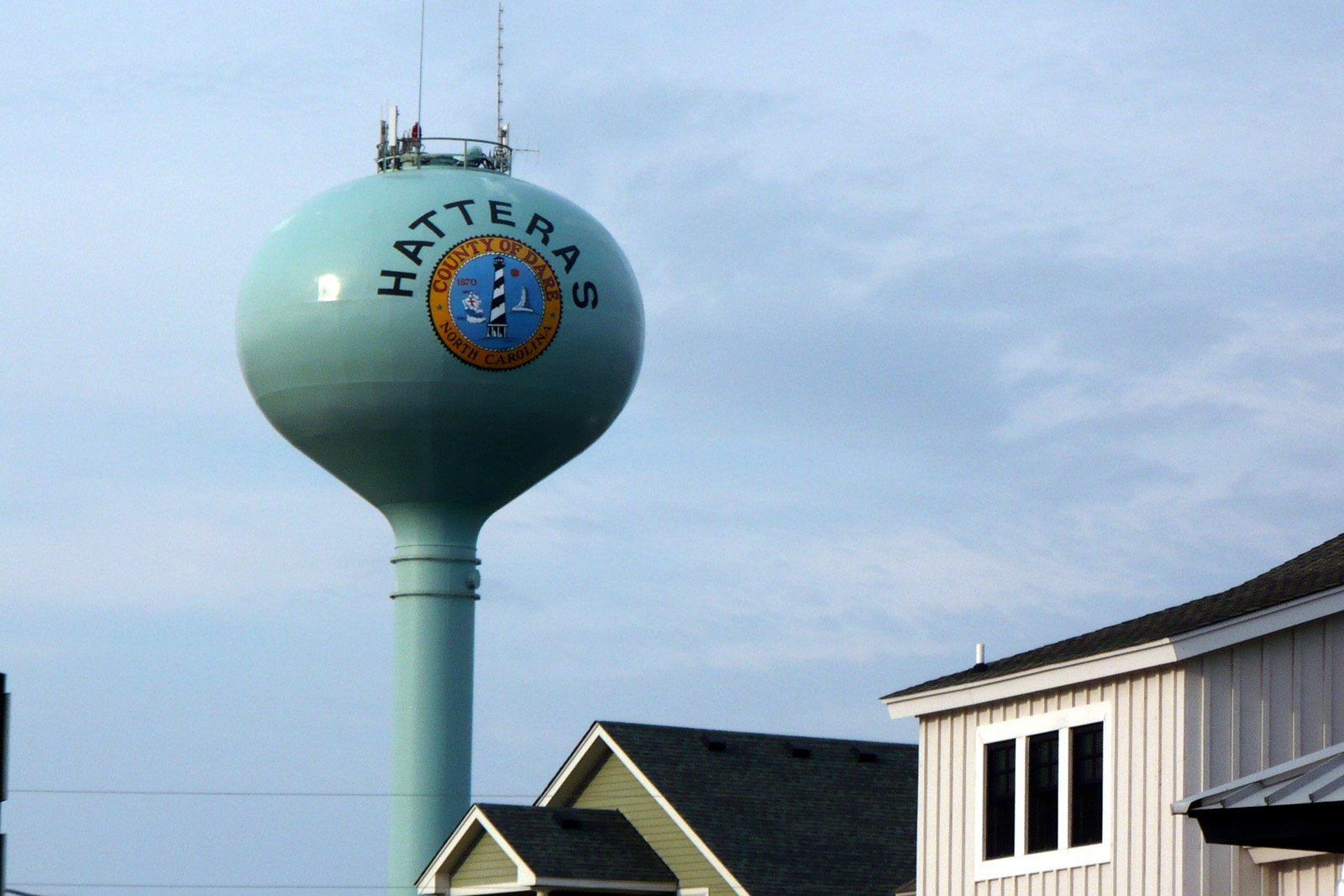
Water tower

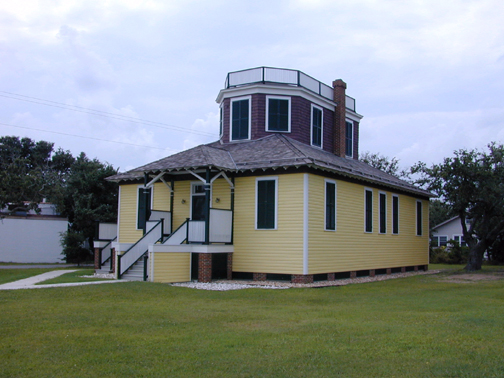
Historical US Weather Bureau office

== Notes ==
Preceded by Frisco	Beaches of The Outer Banks	Succeeded by Hatteras Inlet Peninsula
