= Cape Hatteras Secondary School =

Public school in North Carolina, US

Coordinates: 35°15′56″N 75°33′04″W

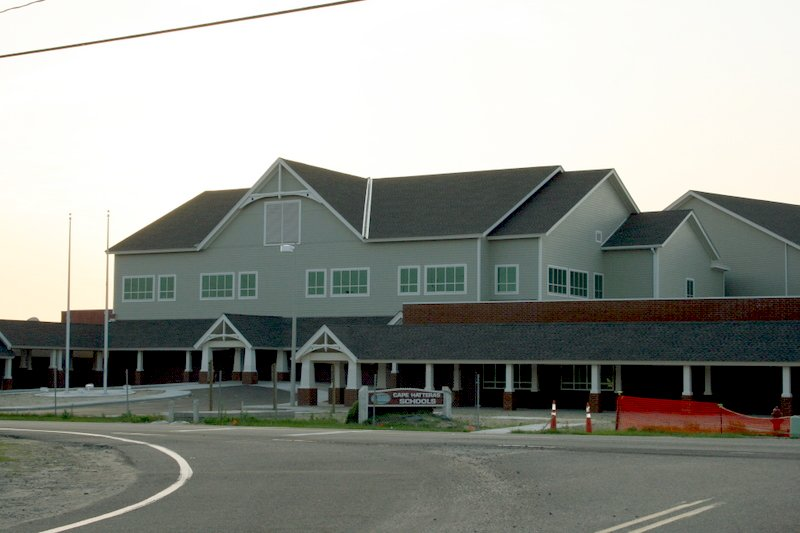
Cape Hatteras School before it was finished

Cape Hatteras Secondary School is a public middle and high school in Buxton, on Cape Hatteras in Dare County, North Carolina. It is a part of Dare County Schools. It serves grades 6 through 12. Its attendance boundary includes areas in the county on islands south of the Oregon Inlet Bridge. This includes the census-designated places of Buxton, Avon, Frisco, Hatteras, Rodanthe, Salvo, and Waves.

== History ==
An older set of buildings was built beginning in 1955, and by the mid-2000s Cape Hatteras Secondary was the oldest school structure in the school district. In 1993 Hurricane Emily flooded the building.

There was a single K-12 school, Cape Hatteras School, but it since 1997 was administratively divided into elementary and secondary divisions.

In 2003 Hurricane Isabel tore a channel between Hatteras and the school building, and therefore for a two-month period boats were used to transport students.

From 2005 to 2007 the district renovated portions and demolished others, spending a total of almost $30 million, far larger than the initial $5.3 million anticipated renovation. In 2007 it had about 350 students.

By 2019 the school was having a new media center built. Hurricane Dorian damaged the campus, with older portions generally more severely impacted. About $400,000 damage was done to the roof. The roof of the media center had been affected.
