= Billy Mitchell Airport =

Airport in Hatteras, North Carolina, United States

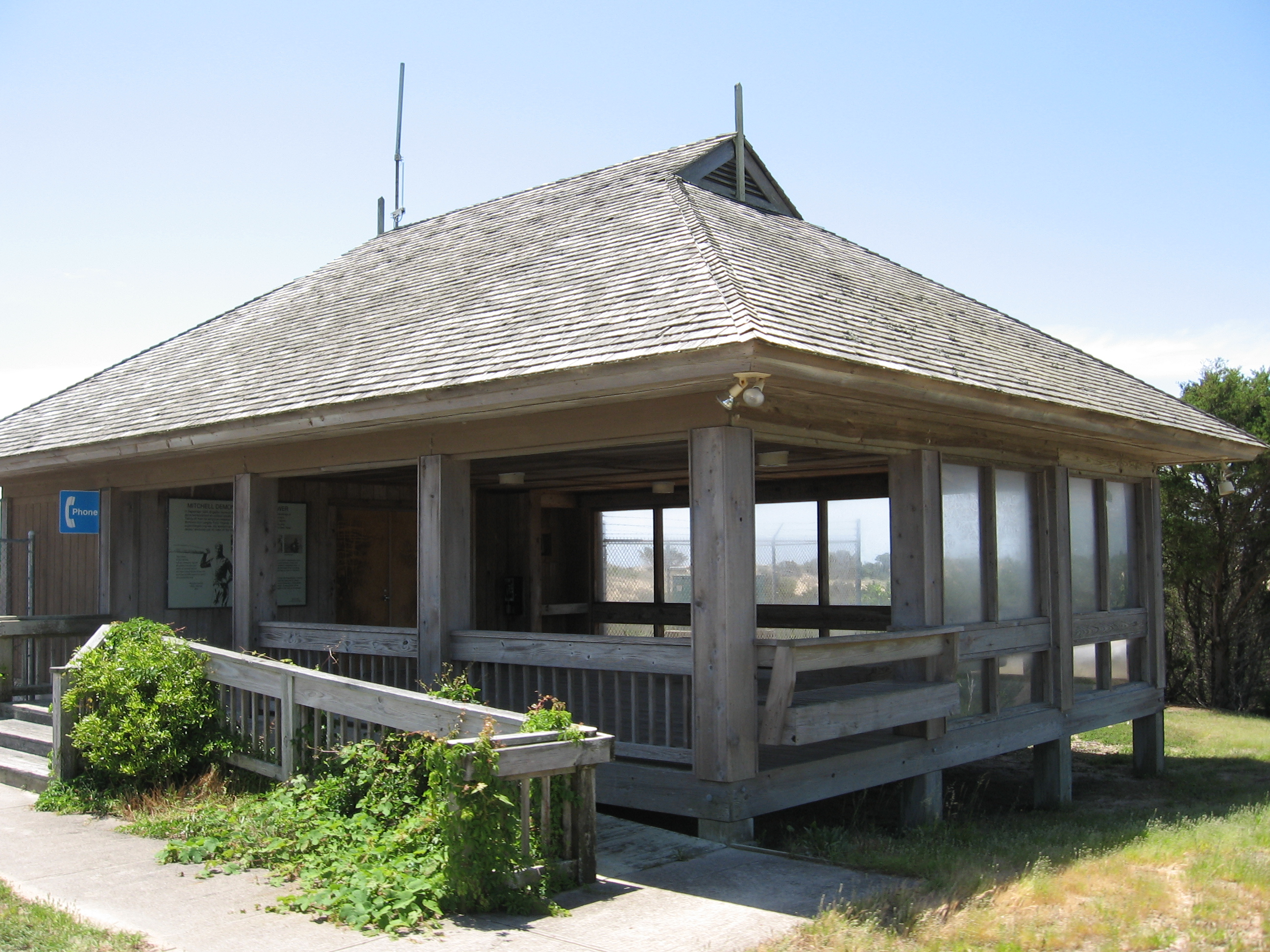
- Airport terminal, May 2009
- IATA: HNC; ICAO: KHSE; FAA LID: HSE

Summary
- Airport type: Public
- Owner: National Park Service
- Serves: Hatteras, North Carolina
- Location: Cape Hatteras National Seashore
- Elevation AMSL: 16 ft (4.9 m)
- Coordinates: 35°13′58″N 075°37′04″W

Map
- Location of airport in North Carolina / United States HNC/KHSE/HSE (the United States)

Runways
Direction	Length		Surface
Direction	ft	m	Surface
7/25	3,002	915	Asphalt

Statistics (2022)
- Aircraft operations (year ending 9/2/2022): 9,200
- Source: Federal Aviation Administration

Billy Mitchell Airport (IATA: HNC, ICAO: KHSE, FAA LID: HSE) is a public use airport located 4 nmi (4.6 mi; 7.4 km) east of the central business district of Hatteras, in Dare County, North Carolina, United States. The airport is located in the Cape Hatteras National Seashore and is owned by the National Park Service. It is named after United States Army Air Service General Billy Mitchell, and is included in the National Plan of Integrated Airport Systems for 2017–2021, which categorized it as a general aviation facility.

Although most U.S. airports use the same three-letter location identifier for the FAA and IATA, Billy Mitchell Airport is assigned HSE by the FAA and HNC by the IATA. The airport's ICAO identifier is KHSE.

== Facilities and aircraft ==
Billy Mitchell Airport covers an area of 100 acres (40 ha) at an elevation of 16 feet (5 m) above mean sea level. It has one runway designated 7/25 with an asphalt surface measuring 3,002 by 75 feet (915 x 23 m).

For the 12-month period ending September 2, 2022, the airport had 9,200 aircraft operations, an average of 25 per day: 97% general aviation, 1% air taxi and 1% military.

== See also ==
- List of airports in North Carolina
