= Potential natural vegetation =

Ecological concept

In ecology, potential natural vegetation (PNV), also known as Kuchler potential vegetation, is the vegetation that would be expected given environmental constraints (climate, geomorphology, geology) without human intervention or a disturbance event.

The concept was developed in the mid 1950s by phytosociologist Reinhold Tüxen, partly expanding on the concept of climax vegetation.

== Concrete applications ==
PNV is widely used in modern conservation and renaturation projects to predict the most adapted species for a definite ecotope. Native species being considered having optimum ecological resilience for their native environment, and the best potential to enhance biodiversity.

To determine "natural" vegetation, scientists research the original vegetation of a land through retrospective ecology.

== Implications ==
Study of past ecosystems allowed to demonstrate, for instance, that numerous contemporary biotopes (like the "wild" Slovenian forests for instance), supposedly largely untouched, were in fact very remote from their natural vegetation.

In Japan, Akira Miyawaki demonstrated after study that, on the one hand, long supposed "native species" had in fact been introduced on account of human intervention since over 1000 years (especially, coniferous being privileged over deciduous). On the other hand, that reforestation with "original" species gives good and often spectacular results.

Maps of potential natural vegetation are used worldwide for improved ecosystem comprehension and management.

== Criticism ==
However the concept is subject to debate, on similar grounds as for the climax theory. Critics argue that ecosystems are not static but ever dynamic: as bioclimatic conditions constantly evolve, it is illusory to define either a final or a primary stage of vegetation.
