= A. W. Kuchler =

German-American naturalist (1907–1999)

August William Kuchler (born August Wilhelm Küchler; 26 July 1907 – 17 June 1999) was a German-born American geographer and naturalist who is noted for developing a plant association system that has become widely used in the United States. Some of this database has been digitized for integration into GIS mapping systems. Kuchler received his Ph.D. in geography from the Ludwig-Maximilians-Universität München in 1935. In 1978, he received the Association of American Geographers' Honors award. He is the author of the book Vegetation Mapping.

== See also ==
- Biome
