= New Inlet =

Coordinates: 35°41′2″N 75°29′2″W

New Inlet was an inlet along the Outer Banks of North Carolina joining Pamlico Sound with the Atlantic Ocean. It had not existed since 1945 before Hurricane Irene temporarily re-opened the inlet in 2011.

== History ==
New Inlet first opened around 1738, separating Bodie Island from Hatteras Island. When a hurricane opened Oregon Inlet about 11 miles to the north in 1846, the land between New Inlet and Oregon Inlet became known as Pea Island. New Inlet now separated Hatteras Island from Pea Island.

The opening of the wider Oregon Inlet meant less water flowed through New Inlet, and by 1922 the inlet had closed.

In 1933, the inlet, or at least one nearby, briefly reopened after a strong hurricane, but it closed only a few months later. Pea Island was a contiguous part of Hatteras Island until the passage of Hurricane Irene in August 2011. The storm temporarily re-opened New Inlet, once again separating Pea Island from Hatteras Island. In 2017 the North Carolina Department of Transportation replaced a temporary road bridge on North Carolina Highway 12 spanning New Inlet with an "interim" bridge, so called due to ongoing efforts to resolve how to best route N.C. 12 through or around the Pea Island National Wildlife Refuge.

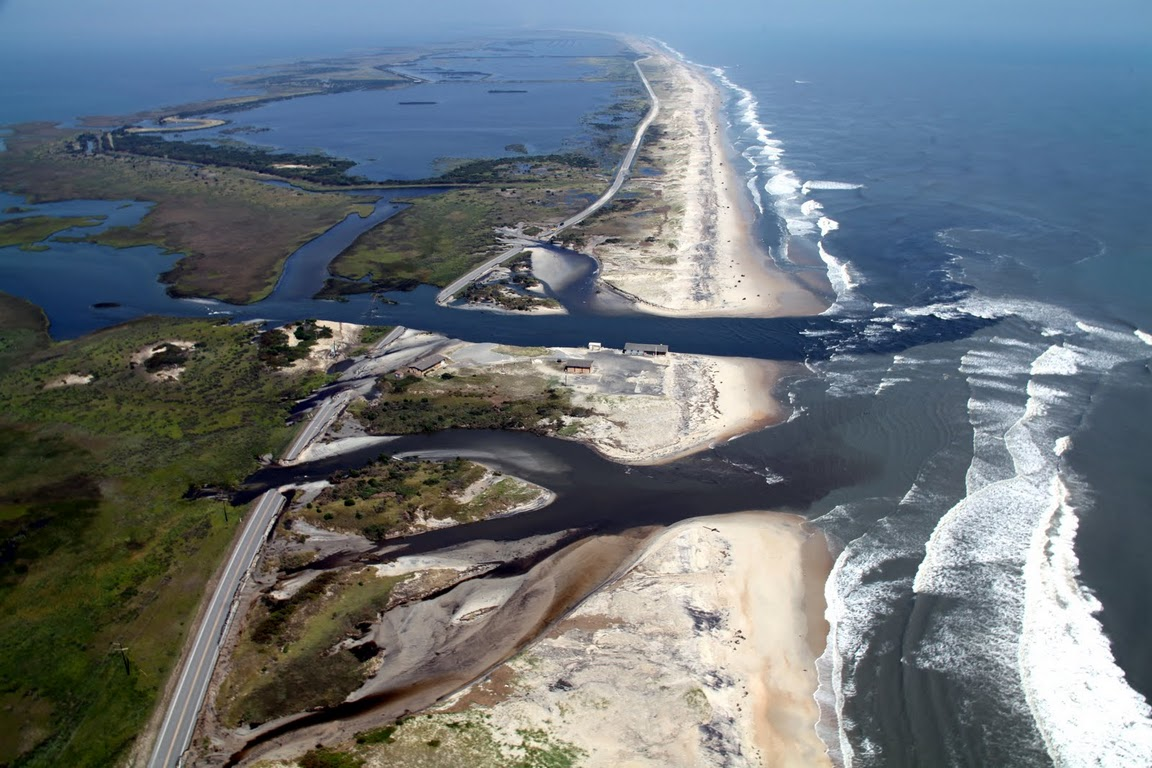
Looking north, August 28, 2011 : hurricane Irene digs again the New Inlet, splitting Pea Island from Hatteras Island and cutting highway NC-12
