= Rodanthe Bridge =

Bridge in North Carolina, United States

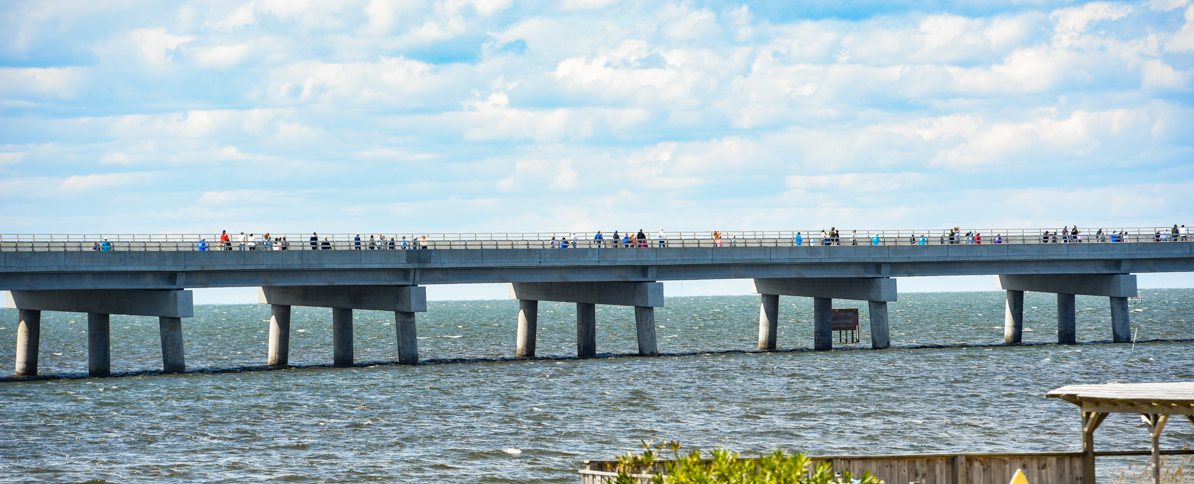
- The Rodanthe Bridge on the date of its opening, 2022
- Coordinates: 35.61°N 75.48°W
- Carries: Two lanes of NC 12
- Crosses: Pamlico Sound
- Locale: Rodanthe, NC

Characteristics
- Design: Trestle

History
- Designer: RK&K
- Constructed by: Flatiron Construction Corp.
- Construction start: September 6, 2018; 6 years ago
- Construction cost: $145 million
- Opened: July 28, 2022; 3 years ago

The Rodanthe Bridge, commonly called the Jug Handle Bridge, is a 2.4-mile-long (3.9 km) two-lane "jug handle" trestle bridge in Dare County, North Carolina. The bridge carries North Carolina Highway 12 from Rodanthe to the southern point of Pea Island National Wildlife Refuge by going west into the Pamlico Sound and then parallel an area of the Hatteras Island that is prone to coastal erosion, washouts, and flooding from storms.

The bridge is designed around climate resilience in mind using nature-based design practices to try to make the bridge more resilient to extreme weather.

== History ==
Construction began in September 2018. The bridge was built by Flatiron Construction Company.

The construction of the bridge was allowed because of a settlement with environmental groups that needed to avoid the Pea Island National Wildlife Refuge.

The bridge opened to traffic on July 28, 2022, with southbound traffic at 11:40 AM, followed by northbound traffic at 12:20 PM.
