= Pea Island =

Island in North Carolina, United States

Coordinates: 35.723°N 75.496°W

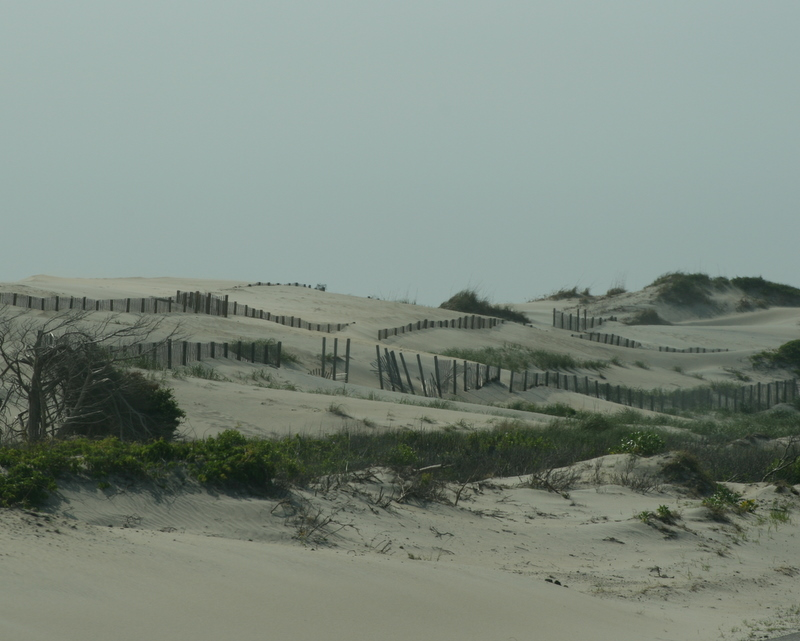
Pea Island dunes

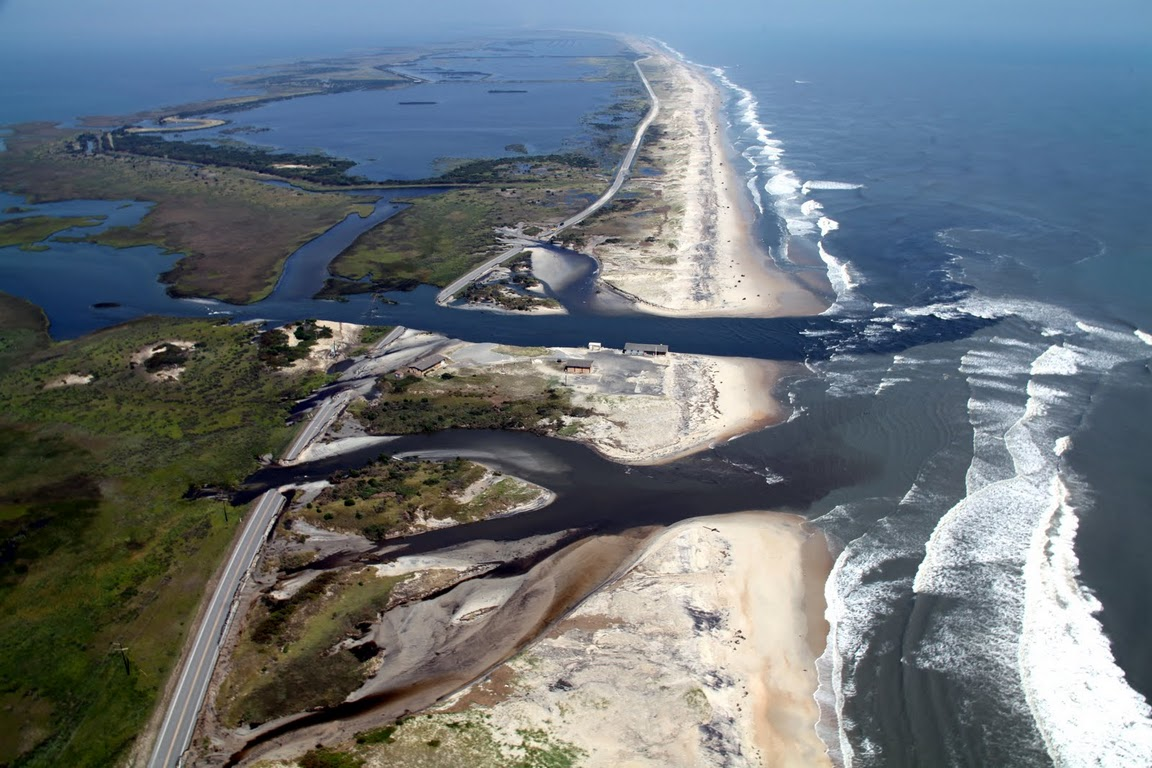
August 28, 2011: hurricane Irene reopens the New Inlet

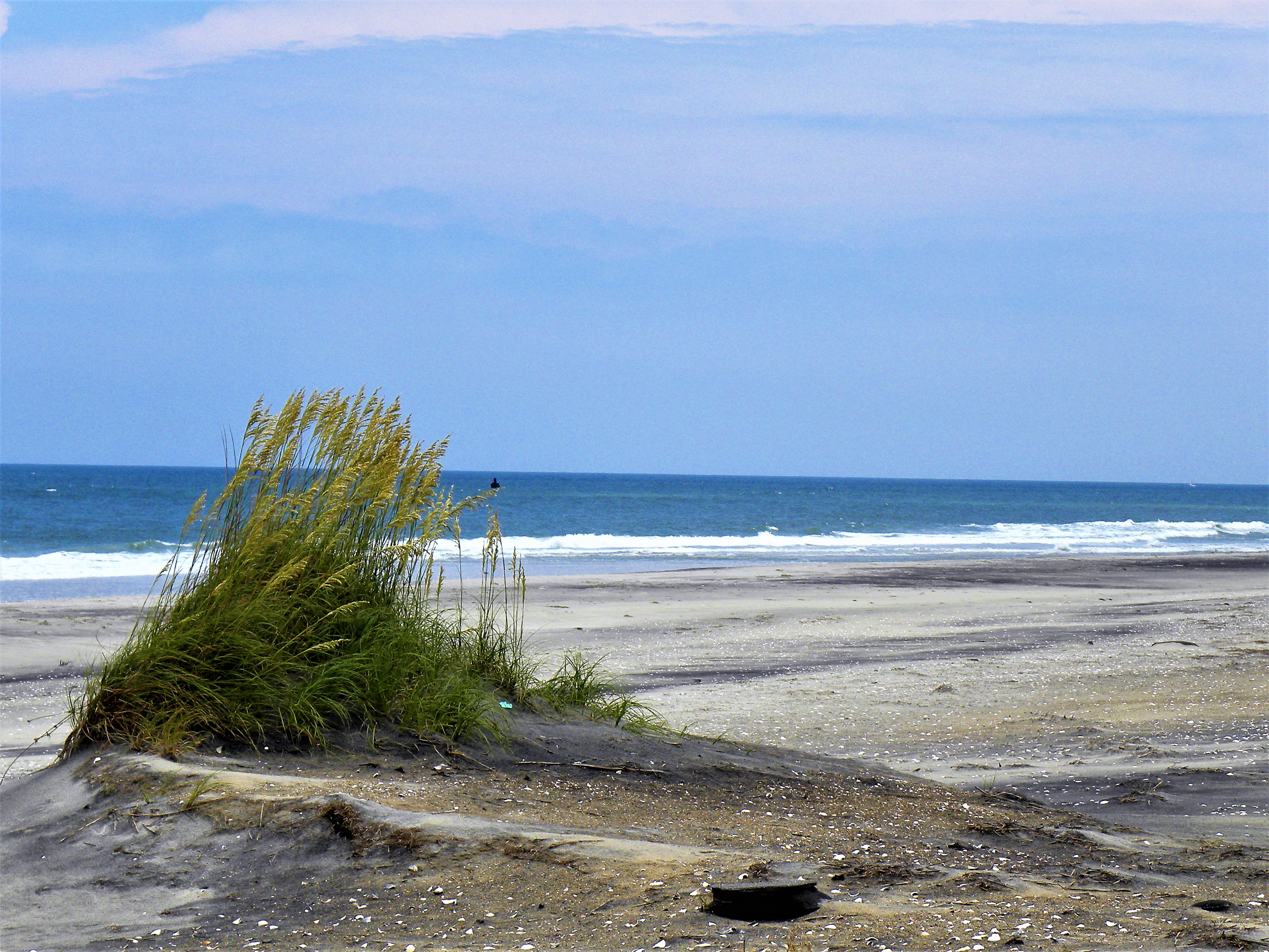
Pea Island ocean view

Pea Island is a barrier island which is part of the Outer Banks of North Carolina. Since 1937, it has been home to the Pea Island National Wildlife Refuge. The Pea Island Life-Saving Station of the United States Coast Guard was located there from the late 19th century until its closure in 1947.

== History ==
=== Geography ===
Because of the shifting nature of the barrier island system of which Pea Island is a part, and the way in which inlets open and close over time, Pea Island has, at times, been contiguous with the neighboring Bodie Island to the North and Hatteras Island to the south.

Pea Island was created when two inlets, the New Inlet in 1738, and Oregon Inlet in 1846, separated it from the neighboring islands. The island was rejoined to Hatteras Island intermittently from 1922 until 1945 as the narrow New Inlet opened and closed with shifting sands.

From 1945 to 2011, Pea Island was merely the northern 11 miles or so of Hatteras Island. Hurricane Irene reopened the New Inlet, making Pea Island separate again, although New Inlet has since closed - reconnecting it with Hatteras.

=== Road and erosion ===
The Oregon Inlet Bridge built between 1962 and 1963 connects Pea Island to Bodie Island and is part of North Carolina Highway 12. As of 2011, three "hot spots" on a six-mile stretch of road on Pea Island were identified as vulnerable to "going to sea" during storms.

Constant dredging to maintain a deep-water channel under the fixed-width bridge has caused severe erosion of the Pea Island shoreline. Efforts to stabilize the shoreline over the years have been costy and unsuccessful in stopping the erosion. These have included the construction of a rock jetty and revetment on the northern end of the island between 1989 and 1991; the pumping of 12 million cubic yards of inlet sand onto the beach and near the shore by the United States Army Corps of Engineers between 1983 and 2009; and the construction of barrier dune-ridges by the North Carolina Department of Transportation.

=== Coast Guard station ===
Pea Island was home to the Pea Island Life-Saving Station, the first U.S. Coast Guard life-saving station to have an all African-American crew.

== Wildlife refuge ==
Since 1937, it has also been home to the Pea Island National Wildlife Refuge.

Preceded by Oregon Inlet	Beaches of The Outer Banks	Succeeded by Rodanthe
