= North Carolina Highway 12 =

State highway in North Carolina, US

North Carolina Highway 12
- Route of NC 12 highlighted in red; approximate ferry routes in blue

Route information
- Maintained by NCDOT
- Length: 148.0 mi (238.2 km)
- Existed: 1962–present
- Tourist routes: Outer Banks Scenic Byway

Major junctions
- South end: US 70 in Sea Level
- NC 45 / Swan Quarter-Ocracoke Ferry in Ocracoke; US 64 / US 158 in Nags Head; US 158 in Kitty Hawk
- North end: North Beach Access Ramp in Corolla

Location
- Country: United States
- State: North Carolina
- Counties: Carteret, Hyde, Dare, Currituck

Highway system
- North Carolina Highway System; Interstate; US; State; Scenic
← NC 11	→ US 13

North Carolina Highway 12 (NC 12) is a 148.0-mile-long (238.2 km) primary state highway in the U.S. state of North Carolina, linking the peninsulas and islands of the Outer Banks. Most sections of NC 12 are two lanes wide, and there are also two North Carolina Ferry System routes which maintain continuity of the route as it traverses the Outer Banks region. NC 12 is part of the Outer Banks Scenic Byway, a National Scenic Byway. The first NC 12 appeared on the 1924 North Carolina Official Map and at its greatest length ran from NC 30 in Pollocksville to NC 48 near Murfreesboro. Over time it was replaced by both U.S. Route 258 (US 258) and NC 58 and ceased to exist in 1958. The current NC 12 first appeared on the 1964 state highway map running from US 158 in Nags Head to Ocracoke. In 1976 NC 12 was extended to US 70 on the mainland and in 1987 was extended north to Corolla.

== Route description ==
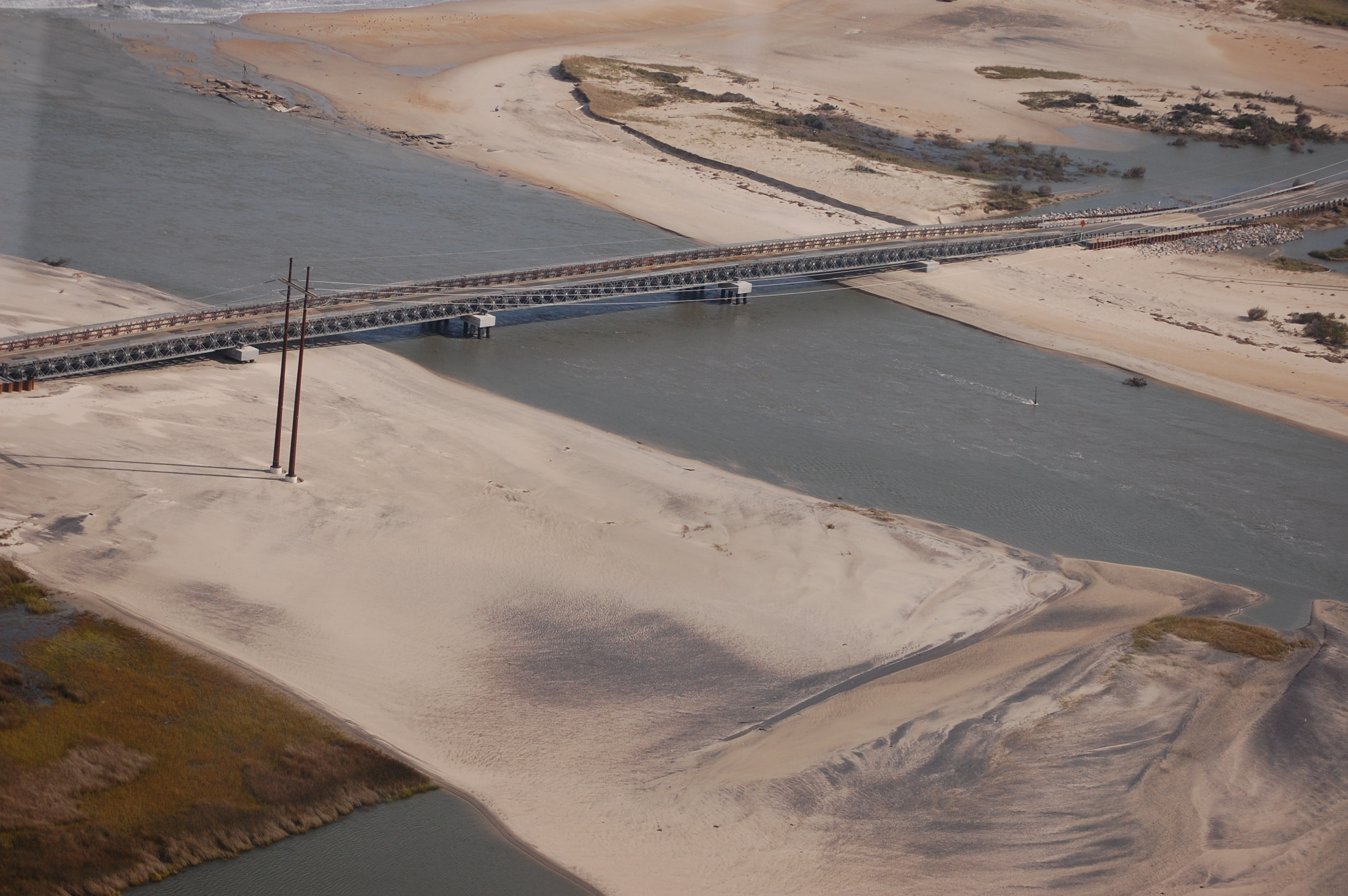
NC 12 crossing a temporary bridge that was built after Hurricane Irene

North Carolina Highway 12 begins at US 70 at the unincorporated community of Sea Level. From there NC 12 travels Northeast along Cedar Island Road to Cedar Island. Once the road enters Cedar Island it turns northwest running along the Cedar Bay all the way to the Cedar Island-Ocracoke ferry. After arriving at Ocracoke, the road immediately runs along the western side of Silver Lake in the eastern side of the town. After leaving Ocracoke, NC 12 enters the Cape Hatteras National Seashore. NC 12 runs along the middle of the island all the way until it reaches the Cape Hatteras-Ocracoke ferry in Point Beach.

After arriving at Hatteras Village, NC 12 turns left onto Coast Guard Road. The route follows Coast Guard Road along the northern part of the town before turning back into NC 12. It then runs along a narrow strip of land in the middle of the island before going through Frisco. After passing through Frisco, the road goes north of the Buxton Woods Coastal Reserve before going through Buxton and passing the Cape Hatteras Lighthouse. Continuing northward, it passes through the communities of Avon, Salvo, and Waves. It bypasses the community of Rodanthe using the Rodanthe Bridge. It crosses the New Inlet bridge onto Pea Island and 11 miles (18 km) further north is the Marc Basnight Bridge over Oregon Inlet, connecting Pea Island to Bodie Island. Nearby is the Bodie Island Lighthouse and visitor center.

NC 12 then continues north, where it intersects US 64 and US 158 at Whalebone Junction, just south of the town of Nags Head. NC 12 runs through Nags Head along the Virginia Dare Trail just east of US 158. The road continues north through Kill Devil Hills, Kitty Hawk and Southern Shores. The stretch from Nags Head to Southern Shores is generally known to locals as “The Beach Road”. NC 12 enters Corolla along Ocean Trail and continues along the west bank through the town. NC 12 ends just north of Corolla and south of the Currituck Banks North Carolina National Estuarine Research Reserve.

Ferries along the route of NC 12 are operated by the North Carolina Ferry System of the North Carolina Department of Transportation (NCDOT).

The highway is the easternmost primary route in the state.

=== Outer Banks Scenic Byway ===
The Outer Banks Scenic Byway begins at the intersection of US 70 and Merrimon Road. The Outer Banks Scenic Byway follows US 70 East to NC 12 on Cedar Island. The byway then continues onto NC 12 North near Atlantic. The byway then crosses the Ocracoke-Cedar Island Ferry north. It follows NC 12 north the rest of the way to the intersection of US 64 and NC 12 in Nags Head where it has its northern terminus. The Outer Banks Scenic Byway spans approximately 131 miles and takes about 6 hours to drive.

== History ==
=== Previous designation ===
North Carolina Highway 12
- Location: Kinston–Pollocksville, NC
- Length: 30 mi (48 km)
- Existed: 1924–1958

NC 12 first appeared on the 1924 State highway map running from Kinston to NC 40 south of Halifax. NC 12 went from Kinston northwest to Snow Hill where it met up with NC 102. From there the road went north to Farmville where it met up with NC 91. From there it continued north to Scotland Neck passing through Tarboro. In Scotland Neck NC 12 turned to the west and ended at NC 40 south of Halifax. By 1933, NC 12 was rerouted to Rich Square and extended south to US 17/NC 30; at the same time, US 258 was routed along of the routing of NC 12 north of Kinston. By 1935, NC 12 was truncated to Kinston with US 258 getting the routing north of Kinston. In 1958 the last portion of NC 12 south of Kinston was renumbered as NC 58.

=== Current designation ===
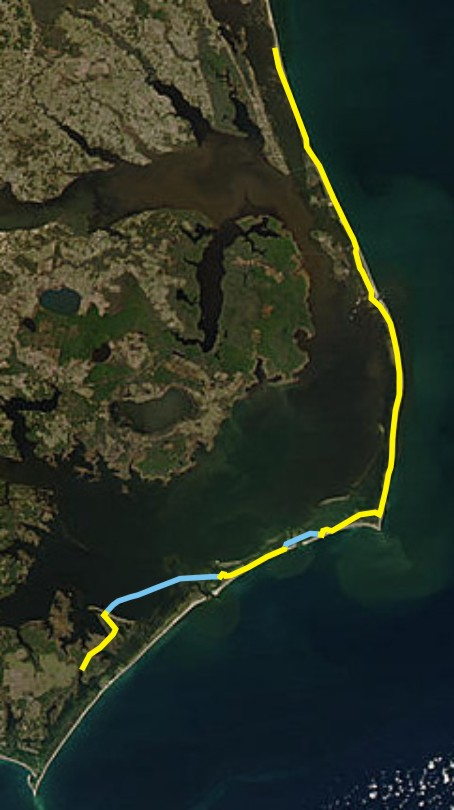
North Carolina Highway 12 is routed along the Outer Banks. Yellow indicates roadbed while blue indicates the ferry routes.

Most of the current route of Highway 12 was originally a sand road until it was paved through the 1950s and early 1960s. The current NC 12 shows up on the 1964 map running from Ocracoke to Whalebone. In 1976 NC 12 was extended onto the mainland to connect with US 70 In 1987, NC 12 was extended north of Nags Head along the Virginia Dare Trail (then Business US 158) NC 12 was extended further to Corolla, its present northern terminus, a year later. A condition of the extension imposed by the North Carolina Department of Transportation is the road extends no further than Corolla.

=== Storm damage ===
NC 12 is often damaged by various storms that frequent the Outer Banks; as has happened for millennia before there was a paved road on the islands, storms will cut new inlets through the islands, or close up existing inlets with sand.

Hatteras Island was cut in two on September 18, 2003, by Hurricane Isabel which opened a new inlet 3,000 feet (910 m) wide and 30 feet (9.1 m) deep through the community of Hatteras Village on the southern end of Hatteras Island. This new inlet was temporarily named the Isabel Inlet after the hurricane. Road access along NC 12 was temporarily severed until the island was repaired and restored by sand pumped ashore by the Army Corps of Engineers. In 2007, Subtropical Storm Andrea caused high winds to push waves over dunes and onto the highway on Hatteras Island, leaving water a foot deep and sand 2 to 3 feet (0.91 m) deep in some places.

NC 12 was severed in two places by Hurricane Irene in late August 2011. The road was breached by two small inlets, about 200 feet (61 m) across apiece, in the Pea Island National Wildlife Refuge, and north of Rodanthe. As a result, the only way to access Hatteras Island was by ferry. On October 10, 2011, a temporary bridge opened over the largest breach. The bridge, which was 662 feet (202 m) long, was replaced in 2017 by an adjacent, more permanent structure. Meanwhile, the inlet has closed.

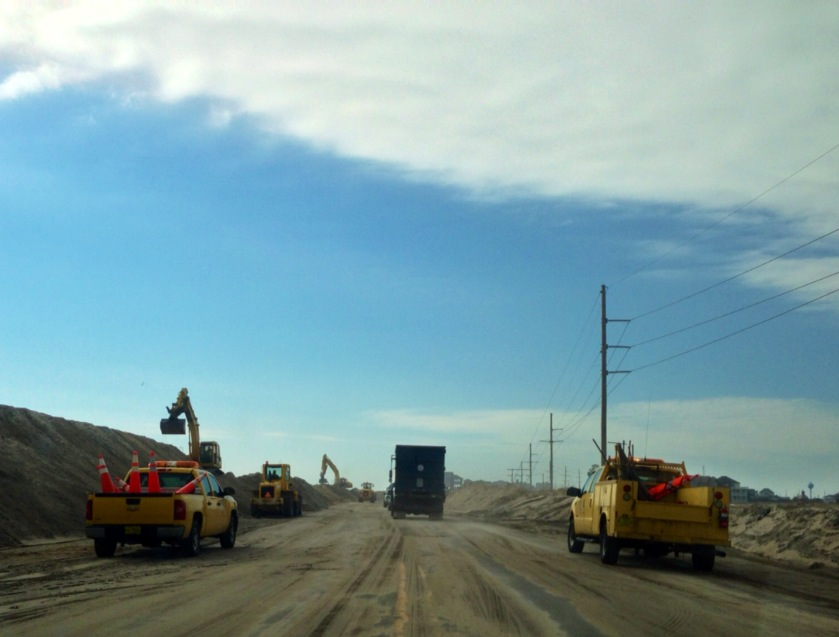
Rebuilding of dunes and placement of sandbags along a breached section of NC 12, March 2013

As Hurricane Sandy battered the East Coast in October 2012, it has left portions of NC 12 inundated with salt water and sand. That forced the closure of the road, leaving the remaining people on the Outer Banks isolated from mainland North Carolina. Sandy washed out a portion of the road at the S-curves north of Rodanthe on the Pea Island National Wildlife Refuge. Emergency ferry service was established between Rodanthe and the Stumpy Point terminals. As in 2011, the ferry service became the lifeline for Hatteras Island. Noreasters and storms repeatedly caused breaches since the road was repaired in December 2012. A state of emergency was declared and $20.8 million of emergency federal funding was secured to construct a more permanent repair.

Hurricane Florence, which made landfall south of the Outer Banks near Wilmington on September 14, 2018, breached the protective dune system and damaged a 1.5 miles (2.4 km)-section of NC 12 on Ocracoke Island. The road was re-opened two weeks later, but it took several additional weeks for the damage to the road and dunes to be fully repaired.

Hurricane Dorian made landfall on the Outer Banks near Cape Hatteras and caused several dune breaches and closures along NC 12 in September, 2019. Damage was particularly bad on Ocracoke Island, where the road was closed for three months, cutting off access to one of the two ferry docks on the island. The damage on Ocracoke was exacerbated when additional storms damaged the dune system and the road before it could be fully repaired from the damage caused by Dorian.

Despite never making landfall in the U.S., and remaining hundreds of miles off shore, Hurricane Teddy caused extensive damage to NC 12 in September 2020 due to storm surge breaching the dune system, and closing the highway between Oregon Inlet and Rodanthe on Hatteras island, and another section between the northern ferry terminals and the main village on Ocracoke island. It took at least two days to repair the road.

A storm in November, 2021 breached the dune system separating NC 12 from the beach; coinciding with high tide this storm caused extensive damage to NC 12 in the area between Rodanthe and Oregon Inlet, and additional damage from flooding occurred at seven other locations along Hatteras Island, isolating many of the communities of the island from the mainland and from each other. It took two days for crews to re-open the roads by clearing sand and rebuilding the breached dunes.

On Oct. 21, 2026, after damage from two nor’easters, North Carolina state transportation officials began early talks with the Federal Highway Administration to pursue emergency relief funding for temporary and permanent repairs to the road. The state department of transportation launched emergency ferry service between Stumpy Point and Rodanthe.

=== Rodanthe Bridge ===
Between 2018 and 2022, a jughandle-shaped bridge bypass of the community of Rodanthe was constructed. The bridge, known as the Rodanthe Bridge, opened on July 28, 2022, and spans 2.4 miles (3.9 km) of the Pamlico Sound. It replaced a section of NC 12 known for frequent closures due to overwash, flooding, and sand accumulation.

== Major intersections ==
County	Location	mi	km	Destinations	Notes
Carteret	Sea Level	0.00	0.00	US 70 – Beaufort, Morehead City, Sealevel	Southern terminus; highway continues as US 70 west (Blue Star Memorial Highway)
Pamlico Sound		12.0	19.3	Cedar Island–Ocracoke Ferry	
Hyde	Ocracoke	32.0	51.5	NC 45 north (Ocracoke–Swan Quarter Ferry) – Swan Quarter	Southern terminus of NC 45
Hatteras Inlet		45.7	73.5	Ocracoke–Hatteras Ferry	
Dare	Oregon Inlet	99.0	159.3	Marc Basnight Bridge	
Dare	Nags Head	110.3	177.5	US 64 west – Manteo	Whalebone Junction; eastern terminus of US 64
Dare	Kitty Hawk	125.5	202.0	To US 158 west	Outbound access via Virginia Dare Trail north, inbound access via SR 1493
Currituck	Corolla	148.0	238.2	North Beach Access Road	Continuation beyond northern terminus
1.000 mi = 1.609 km; 1.000 km = 0.621 mi

== See also ==
- North Carolina Bicycle Route 7 – Concurrent with NC 12 from US 70 to the Cedar Island–Ocracoke Ferry
