= Hurricane Irene =

Category 3 Atlantic hurricane in 2011

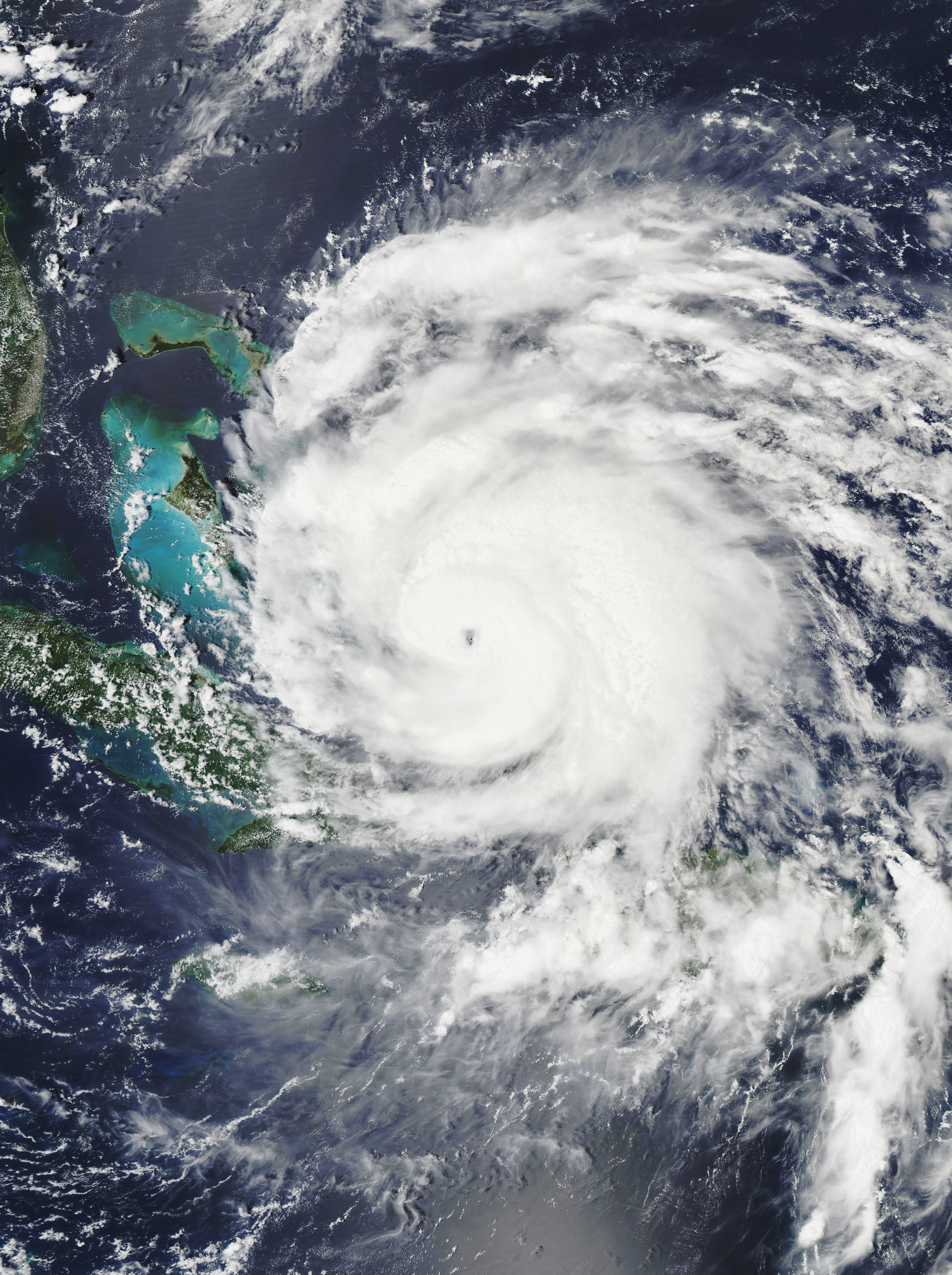
- Hurricane Irene shortly after peak intensity over the Bahamas on August 24

Meteorological history
- Formed: August 21, 2011
- Extratropical: August 28, 2011
- Dissipated: August 30, 2011

Category 3 major hurricane
- 1-minute sustained (SSHWS/NWS)
- Highest winds: 120 mph (195 km/h)
- Lowest pressure: 942 mbar (hPa); 27.82 inHg

Overall effects
- Fatalities: 58 (49 direct, 9 indirect)
- Damage: $14.2 billion (2011 USD)
- Areas affected: Lesser Antilles, Greater Antilles, Lucayan Archipelago, East Coast of the United States, Atlantic Canada
- IBTrACS
- Part of the 2011 Atlantic hurricane season

Hurricane Irene was a large and destructive tropical cyclone which affected much of the Caribbean and East Coast of the United States during late August 2011. The ninth named storm, first hurricane, and first major hurricane of the 2011 Atlantic hurricane season, Irene originated from a well-defined Atlantic tropical wave that began showing signs of organization east of the Lesser Antilles. Due to development of atmospheric convection and a closed center of circulation, the system was designated as Tropical Storm Irene on August 20, 2011. After intensifying, Irene made landfall in St. Croix as a strong tropical storm later that day. Early on August 21, the storm made a second landfall in Puerto Rico. While crossing the island, Irene strengthened into a Category 1 hurricane. The storm paralleled offshore of Hispaniola, continuing to slowly intensify in the process. Shortly before making four landfalls in The Bahamas, Irene peaked as a 120 mph (190 km/h) Category 3 hurricane.

Thereafter, the storm slowly leveled off in intensity as it struck the Bahamas and then curved northward after passing east of Grand Bahama. Continuing to weaken, Irene was downgraded to a Category 1 hurricane before making landfall on the Outer Banks of North Carolina on August 27, becoming the first hurricane to make landfall in the United States since Hurricane Ike in 2008. Later that day, the storm re-emerged into the Atlantic from southeastern Virginia. Although Irene remained a hurricane over water, it weakened to a tropical storm while making yet another landfall in the Little Egg Inlet in southeastern New Jersey on August 27. A few hours later, Irene made its ninth and final landfall in Brooklyn, New York City. Early on August 29, Irene transitioned into an extratropical cyclone while striking Vermont, after remaining inland as a tropical cyclone for less than 12 hours.

Throughout its path, Irene caused widespread destruction and at least 49 deaths. Damage estimates throughout the United States are estimated near $13.5 billion, making Irene one of the costliest hurricanes on record in the country. In addition, monetary losses in the Caribbean and Canada were $830 million and $130 million respectively for a total of nearly $14.2 billion in damage.

== Meteorological history ==
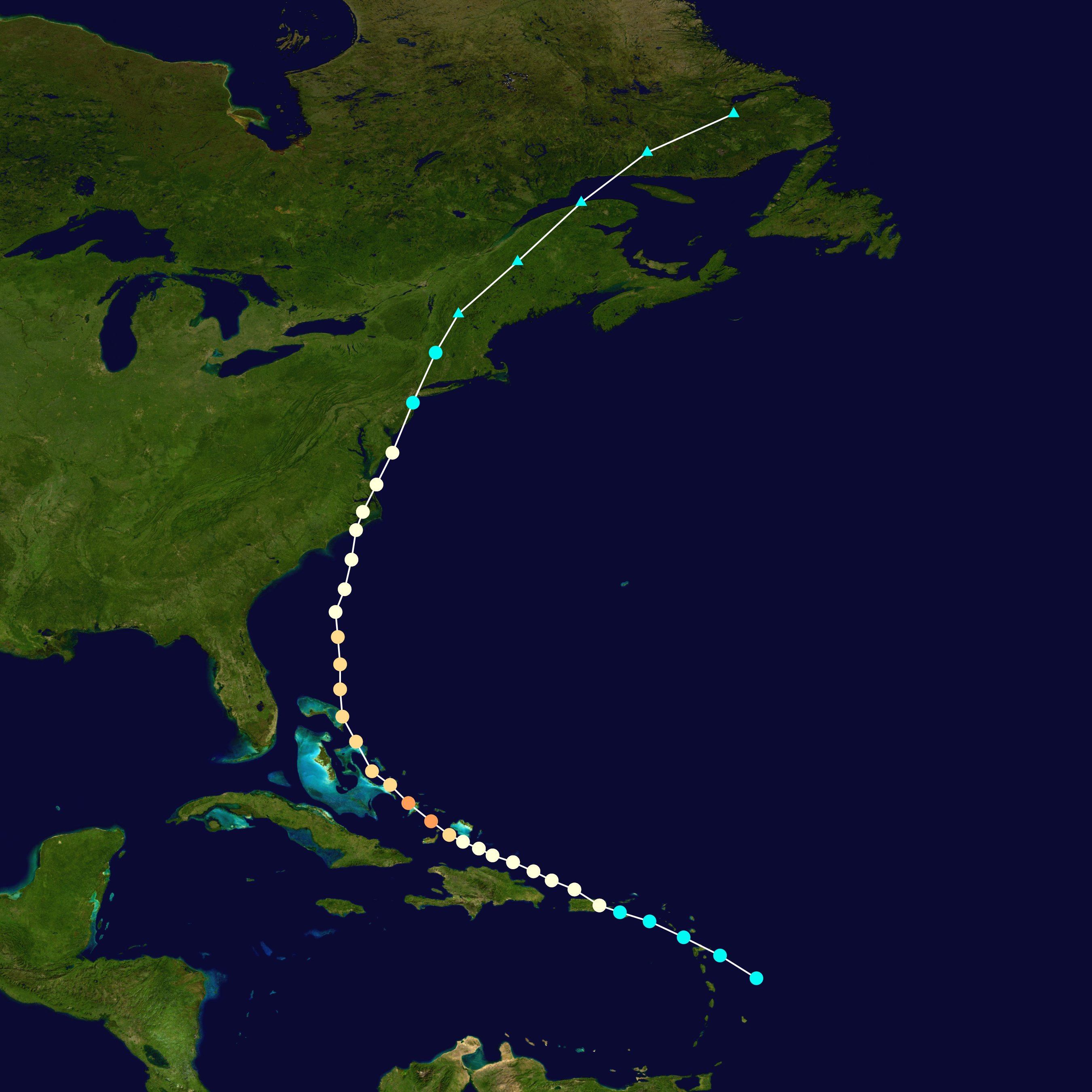
Map plotting the storm's track and intensity, according to the Saffir–Simpson scale Map key Saffir–Simpson scale Tropical depression (≤38 mph, ≤62 km/h) Tropical storm (39–73 mph, 63–118 km/h) Category 1 (74–95 mph, 119–153 km/h) Category 2 (96–110 mph, 154–177 km/h) Category 3 (111–129 mph, 178–208 km/h) Category 4 (130–156 mph, 209–251 km/h) Category 5 (≥157 mph, ≥252 km/h) Unknown Storm type Tropical cyclone Subtropical cyclone Extratropical cyclone, remnant low, tropical disturbance, or monsoon depression

On August 15, 2011, a tropical wave exited the coast of West Africa and emerged into the Atlantic Ocean, characterized by a distinct low-level cyclonic rotation and deep tropical humidity. It remained well-defined while moving steadily westward for several days to the south of the Cape Verde Islands, although at the time any notable convection occurred well to the southwest of its axis. As the wave distanced itself from the islands, development of thunderstorms and showers in its proximity continued to remain scarce, and it became rather broad in appearance. On August 19, the convective structure began to show signs of organization as the associated atmospheric pressure lowered, and with a progressively favorable environment situated ahead of the wave its chances of undergoing tropical cyclogenesis markedly increased. The strong thunderstorm activity continued to become more pronounced around the main low-pressure feature. By August 20, the National Hurricane Center noted that tropical cyclone formation was imminent as the wave neared the Lesser Antilles, and a reconnaissance aircraft confirmed the presence of a small surface circulation center just southwest of a burst of vigorous convection and unusually high sustained winds, indicating sufficient organization for the cyclone to be upgraded into Tropical Storm Irene at 23:00 UTC that day.

Irene was positioned about 190 mi (310 km) east of Dominica in the Lesser Antilles when it was classified and named, along weakening high pressure over the west-central Atlantic, inducing a roughly west-northwestward path for most of its journey through the eastern Caribbean. Its mid-level circulation continued to become better established as hints of pronounced banding features curved north of the surface center. On August 21, the surface center reformed closer to the deepest convection; furthermore, an anticyclone aloft provided supportive outflow over the cyclone. With the improved structure, as well as light wind shear and high sea surface temperatures, Irene was forecast to strengthen to near hurricane force prior to landfall in Hispaniola. Over the subsequent day (August 22), while passing near the island of Saint Croix in the U.S. Virgin Islands, Irene traced toward Puerto Rico, more northward than initially expected, where it underwent a considerable increase in strength and organization. Hours later, Irene moved ashore, approaching from the southeast near Punta Santiago, Humacao, Puerto Rico, with estimated sustained winds of 70 mph (110 km/h). Despite the storm's interaction with land, radar imagery showed a ragged eye-like feature, and Doppler weather radar data indicated wind speeds in excess of hurricane force. Just after its initial landfall, Irene was accordingly upgraded to a Category 1 hurricane, the first of the 2011 Atlantic hurricane season.

With the hurricane then situated just north of the mountainous coast of Hispaniola, the storm deepened little after reemerging over water, and any additional organization during the rest of the day was gradual. After briefly weakening on August 23, however, Irene began to develop a distinct eye encircled by an area of deepening convection the next morning. Moving erratically through the southeast Bahamas over very warm waters, Irene quickly expanded as its outflow aloft became very well established; the cyclone intensified into a Category 3 major hurricane as it recurved toward the northwest along a weakness in the subtropical ridge. The cyclone subsequently underwent a partial eyewall replacement cycle, which resulted in some reduction in its winds. Although a distinct eye redeveloped for a few hours, it obscured once again soon thereafter; Irene was unable to recover from the cycle, with no further significant intensification expected thereafter.

Irene moving through the Outer Banks on August 27

Early on August 27, Irene further weakened to a Category 1 hurricane as it approached the Outer Banks of North Carolina. At 7:30 am EDT (11:30 UTC) on the same day, Irene made landfall near Cape Lookout, on North Carolina's Outer Banks, with winds of 85 mph (137 km/h), but exhibited an unusually low pressure of 951 mbar, which is typically found in a category 3 hurricane. After having tracked over land for about 10 hours, the eye of Irene became cloud-filled, although the center remained well-defined on radar images. Early in the evening of August 27, Irene re-emerged into the Atlantic near False Cape in Virginia as a marginal Category 1 hurricane, slowly weakening as it continued northward and weakening to a tropical storm early on August 28. Shortly before sunrise, at 5:35 am EDT (09:35 UTC) on August 28, Irene made a second landfall at Brigantine in southeastern New Jersey near Atlantic City with winds of 70 mph (110 km/h) and soon after moved over water again, hugging the New Jersey coastline. About 3 1/2 hours later, Tropical Storm Irene made landfall with 65 mph (105 km/h) winds in the Coney Island neighborhood of Brooklyn, New York.

Following its final New York landfall, Irene moved northeast over New England while maintaining its strength, before it was declared an extratropical cyclone early on August 29, while its center was located near the New Hampshire/Vermont border. During that day, the system continued to move towards the northeast, before it was absorbed by a frontal system early on August 30. This system, which the Free University of Berlin dubbed as Ex-Irene, continued moving northeastward for another few days, reaching Iceland on September 2. Afterward, the system stalled just south of Iceland and gradually weakened, before it was absorbed by another approaching extratropical cyclone to the west on September 6.

== Preparations ==
=== Caribbean ===
In response to the formation of Irene, tropical storm warnings were issued for all of the Leeward Islands and Puerto Rico. Also in the Lesser Antilles, the storm's approach prompted authorities in the U.S. Virgin Islands to close off air- and seaports, as well as to open public shelters. As Irene was forecast to make landfall on Hispaniola, a tropical storm watch was initially issued for the south coast of the Dominican Republic, though it was upgraded to a hurricane warning on August 21, after strengthening was forecast. In light of the expected intensification to hurricane status, a tropical storm warning was also issued for the northern coast fire of that country, while a tropical storm watch was put in effect for all of Haiti; the tropical storm warning for Puerto Rico was simultaneously upgraded to a hurricane watch. Later that day, all of the Dominican Republic was placed under a hurricane warning, with the tropical storm watch for Haiti upgraded to a warning and a tropical storm watch initiated for the southeastern Bahamas and the Turks and Caicos Islands. As Irene's forecast track became justified, the latter watch was upgraded to a warning on August 22, while a hurricane watch was declared for the central Bahamas.

=== Mainland United States ===
With Irene's projected path fixed over much of the United States East Coast, over 65 million people from the Carolinas to northern New England were estimated to be at risk. Due to the threat, state officials, as well as utilities, transportation facilities, ports, industries, oil refineries, and nuclear power plants, promptly prepared to activate emergency plans; residents in the areas stocked up on food supplies and worked to secure homes, vehicles and boats. States of emergency and hurricane warnings were declared for much of the East Coast, including North Carolina, Virginia, Maryland, Delaware, the District of Columbia, Pennsylvania, New Jersey, New York, Connecticut, Rhode Island, Massachusetts, Vermont, New Hampshire, and Maine.

In advance of the storm, hundreds of thousands of people evacuated near coastal areas, and hundreds of shelters were prepared. Many gasoline stations in the region reported shortages due to the preparations for Irene. Six Major League Baseball games were postponed or moved to August 27 in doubleheaders, and one National Football League preseason game was postponed. The Barclays golf tournament was shortened and three Major League Soccer games were postponed.

==== Southeast ====
In South Carolina, Emergency Management was already on standby in Charleston and Dorchester counties in preparation for Irene.

In North Carolina, a mandatory evacuation order was issued on August 23, for Ocracoke Island and Hyde County. Governor Bev Perdue declared a state of emergency on August 25, with hurricane and tropical storm watches posted for the state; a mandatory evacuation was issued for Carteret County and for all tourists of Dare County, though the latter was extended to include all residents by the next day. In addition, officials urged residents at the Bogue Banks to commence evacuations by 6 am August 26, and tourists in Currituck County were advised to move inland. Seymour Johnson Air Force Base planned to move jets to Barksdale Air Force Base in Louisiana; Marine Corps Air Station Cherry Point and Marine Corps Air Station New River both evacuated their aircraft as well. Progress Energy announced on August 26, it would have 800 more line workers and 250 tree cutters ready after Hurricane Irene. Officials at UNC-Wilmington issued a voluntary evacuation and enforced a curfew in response to the storm, interrupting move-in activities. As low-level atmospheric confluence within the outer bands developed near the coast, a tornado watch was issued from north-northeast of Cape Hatteras to southwest of Wilmington.

Virginia Governor Bob McDonnell declared a state of emergency in preparation for any possible effects from the hurricane along coastlines. Authorities in many cities along the Hampton Roads issued voluntary and mandatory evacuations for low-lying and oceanfront areas. The city of Poquoson ordered a mandatory evacuation for all of its citizens. Public storm shelters were opened in most of the cities, and officials also prepared school buildings to accommodate evacuees. By August 25, dozens of vessels at the Norfolk and Newport News shipyards began to evacuate or prepare to weather the storm, including the carriers Enterprise, Dwight D. Eisenhower, Harry S. Truman, Theodore Roosevelt, and the construction site of the Gerald R. Ford. The United States Navy ordered ships to halt their operations and clear the warning zone. Fort Monroe Army base was evacuated on August 26; Langley Air Force Base followed suit the next day, save essential personnel.

==== Mid-Atlantic ====
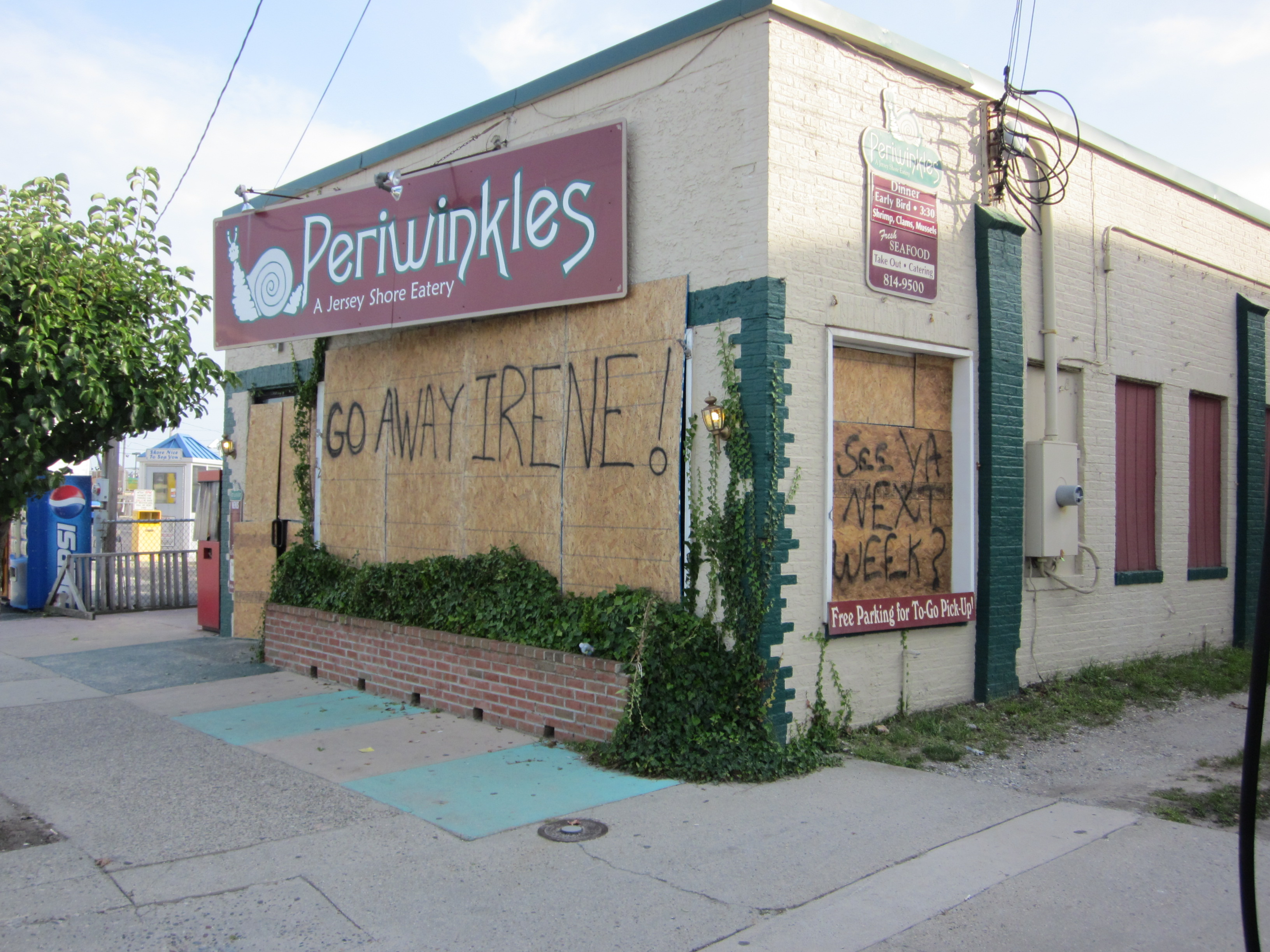
A restaurant boarded up in preparation for Irene in Ocean City, New Jersey

On August 25, Maryland Governor Martin O'Malley declared a state of emergency in preparation for Irene. The town of Ocean City initiated "phase one" of its contingency plan that same day, which includes a mandatory evacuation order for international workforce students. Hours later, phase three of the plan was instituted; it ordered a mandatory evacuation scheduled to start at midnight August 25, for all residents, with the requirement that everyone be evacuated by 5 pm local time, August 26. Certain geographic areas of Somerset and Wicomico Counties, along with all mobile homes in Wicomico County, had mandatory evacuation orders put in effect. Public shelters were made available in Dorchester, Somerset, Wicomico, and Worcester Counties.

In Delaware, Governor Jack Markell ordered visitors to evacuate the Delaware beaches effective 6:00 pm on August 25. In addition, he declared a state of emergency; shelters were scheduled to open throughout the state on August 26. The Cape May – Lewes Ferry across Delaware Bay also suspended service for late August 27, through August 28, in response to the pending arrival of the hurricane. Toll operations on DE 1 were halted to optimize evacuation rates along highways. A tornado watch was issued for Delaware in association with Irene at 10:40 am August 27.

In Washington, D.C., the forecast arrival of Hurricane Irene caused postponement of the planned August 28 dedication ceremony for the Martin Luther King Jr. Memorial. Amtrak service from Washington's Union Station southward was canceled from August 26, until August 28.

In eastern Pennsylvania, the ground was already saturated with water when the hurricane arrived, since the preceding month had been the wettest ever recorded. Philadelphia mayor Michael Nutter expressed concern that there could be severe devastation in the city and surrounding areas, and Governor Tom Corbett declared a state of emergency in Pennsylvania. The Southeastern Pennsylvania Transportation Authority decided to halt all commuter rail service after midnight August 28. On August 26, Philadelphia's mayor announced there would be no mandatory evacuations for the city, but urged residents to be prudent and to take action and leave should conditions warrant. The Philadelphia International Airport closed at 10:30 pm on Saturday and remained closed until Monday.

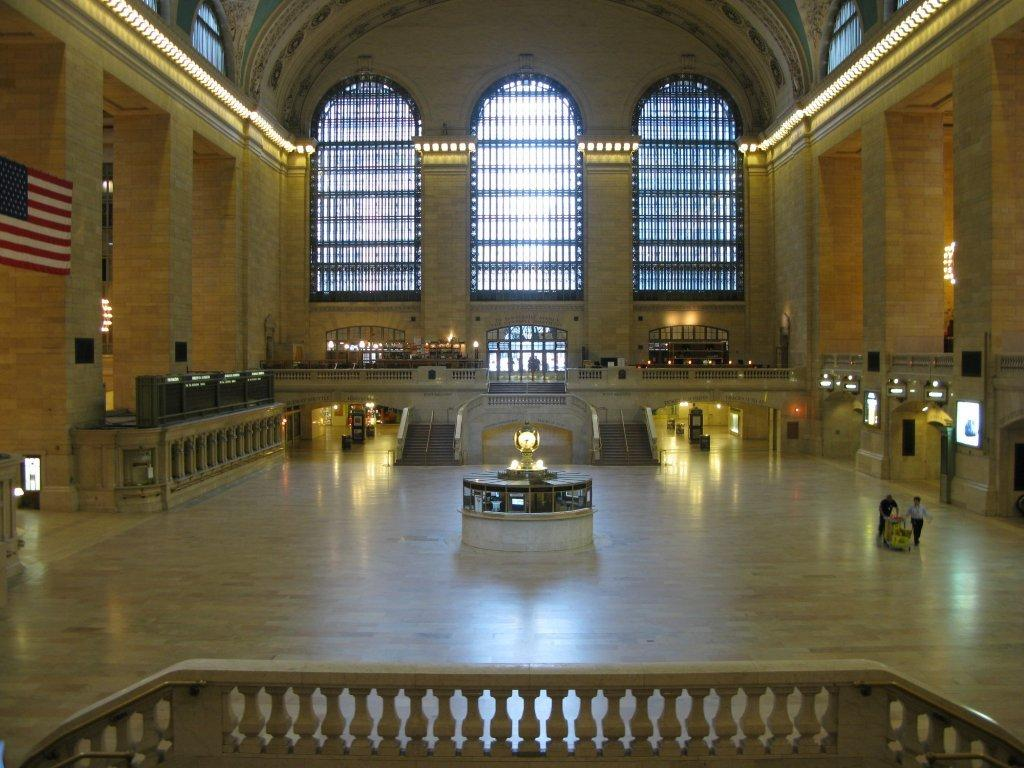
Grand Central Terminal stands empty following the shut down of the Metro-North Railroad.

In New Jersey, Governor Chris Christie declared a state of emergency on August 25, with President Obama reaffirming the declaration nationally by August 27. Mandatory evacuations were ordered for all of Cape May County and all Atlantic County shore communities east of US 9, prompting Atlantic City's first evacuation in history. About 1,500 National Guard troops were deployed in New Jersey. One National Guard outfit was deployed to flood-prone Manville, NJ, (which was also devastated by Hurricane Floyd in 1999) A couple of National Guardsman attempted to drive two of their deep-water-capable FMTVs through the flooding, but the floodwaters were too deep. The vehicles were overtaken by the waters beneath a dipping Conrail underpass on South Main Street. The Guardsmen were photographed and videotaped by onlookers above them on the train bridge, and both photos and videos went viral over social media. Mandatory evacuations were also ordered for all of Long Beach Island in Ocean County and the Barnegat Peninsula. To relieve evacuation traffic, toll operations were temporarily suspended on the Garden State Parkway south of the Raritan River and on the Atlantic City Expressway. Residents of low-lying areas of Hudson County along the Hudson River and Upper New York Bay were advised to evacuate.

Governor of New York Andrew Cuomo declared a state of emergency on August 26, and that day issued a mandatory evacuation order for low-lying areas of New York City. A day prior, New York City Mayor Michael Bloomberg had announced that the city would prepare to create "an enormous shelter system" for residents without access to higher ground. President Barack Obama issued a state of emergency declaration for the New York metropolitan area, freeing federal disaster funds, and tasking the Federal Emergency Management Agency and the Department of Homeland Security to coordinate disaster relief efforts. Cuomo deployed 2,000 National Guard troops to assist police, the Metropolitan Transportation Authority (MTA) and the Port Authority in New York and Long Island. Possible rising seawater levels from storm surge and a predicted high tide led to a complete shutdown of the MTA, the nation's largest mass transit system. All subway, bus, and commuter rail service in New York City was halted at noon on August 27. Four area hospitals began evacuating patients on August 26; sixteen nursing homes and adult care facilities were also evacuated. The New York International Fringe Festival canceled all performances for August 27 and 28, as did all Broadway shows for those days. The United States Tennis Association canceled special events planned for the 2011 US Open.

==== New England ====
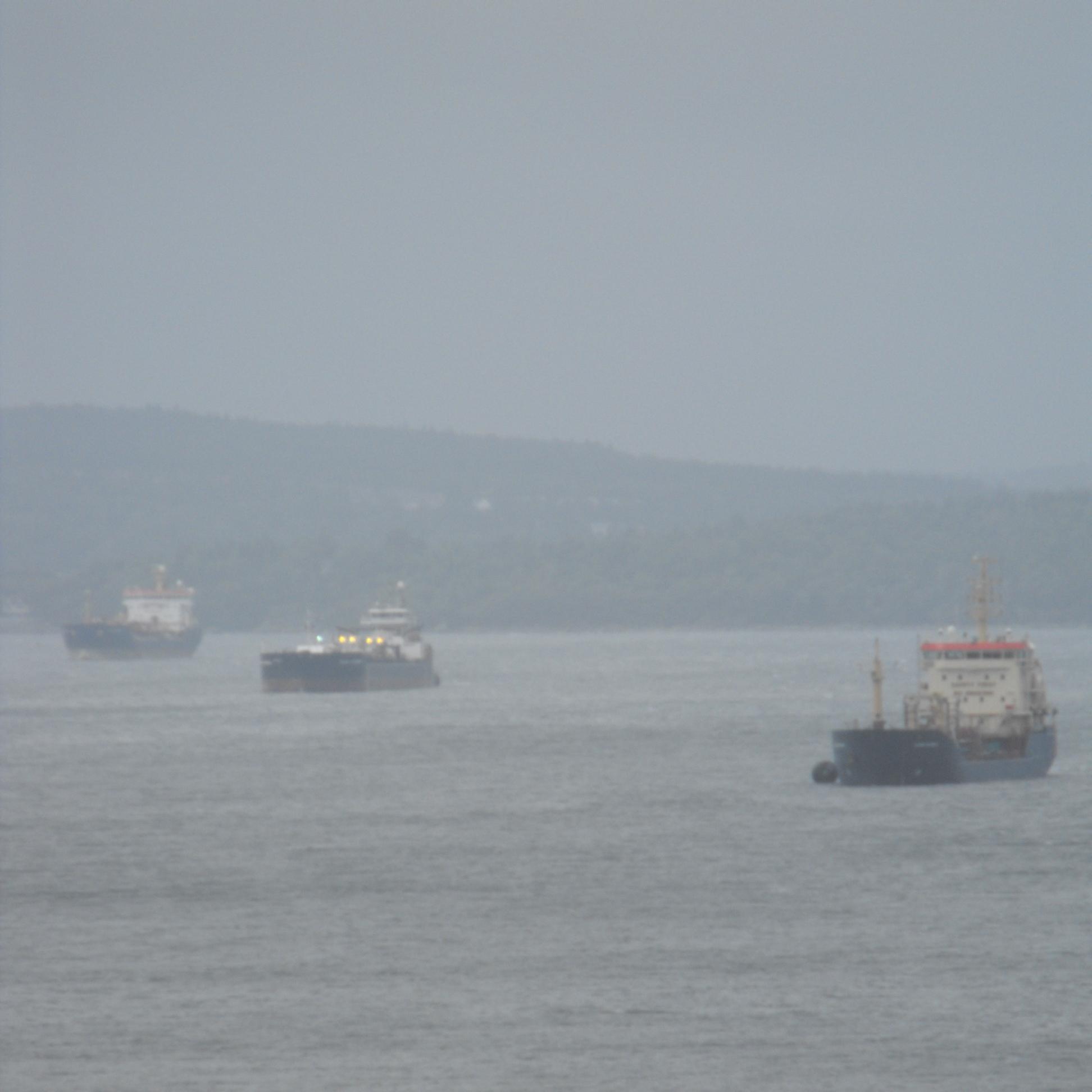
Vessels riding out the storm in Bedford Basin near Halifax, Nova Scotia

In Connecticut, residents in parts of Connecticut began bracing themselves for a potential strike from a hurricane as early as August 24. Local mayors initiated debris removal operations across many highways and local roads. The first selectman of Bethel stated that sandbags were already being readied to protect certain areas from flooding. By August 25, Governor Dannel P. Malloy declared a state of emergency, allowing the state to order evacuations and protect the well-being of residents. In a press conference, Malloy urged residents "to take the storm 'as seriously as any event we've ever prepared for.'" In light of this, stores reported a significant increase in sales; items such as generators, batteries and flashlights sold in large numbers across the state. Due to the threat of widespread power outages, Connecticut Light & Power canceled vacations and placed all personnel on standby in advance of the storm.

Towns across Connecticut began enacting emergency plans, such as designating and preparing shelters, on August 25. Local boards of selectmen held several meetings on which areas required public shelters and what buildings to use for this purpose. In some areas, school districts decided to delay their first day until August 30 while others delayed until September 1.Central Connecticut State University also canceled classes for August 29. Early on August 26, a hurricane watch was issued for the entire Connecticut coastline and tropical storm warnings were put in place for all inland counties. All campgrounds and state parks were planned to be shut down by August 28 due to dangerous conditions.

Voluntary evacuations orders were issued of residents living in low-lying areas or mobile homes in Norwich. About 200 Connecticut National Guard soldiers were notified to be deployed in state on August 28 while 500 others were placed on standby. Mass transit, including all Metro-North trains, across the state was shut down for the duration of the storm, beginning on the evening of August 27. At the Naval Submarine Base New London in Groton, all submarines were moved out to sea to ride out the storm before being allowed to return. Mandatory evacuations of coastal areas in Fairfield were implemented on August 27 and roads across the city were to be mostly closed by the following afternoon. A local high school was also converted into a shelter for evacuees.

In Massachusetts, Governor Deval Patrick declared a state of emergency on August 26, activated 500 Massachusetts National Guard troops, and also planned to activate an additional 2,000 troops the following day in preparation for the storm. In an unusual move, the MBTA suspended all metropolitan Boston public transportation at 8:00 am on August 28.

In Vermont, Governor Peter Shumlin declared a state of emergency on August 27, in preparation for the hurricane's arrival. In a joint statement, Vermont electric utilities announced that they planned to have extra staff on hand. The National Weather Service stated that it anticipated 2–5 inches (51–127 mm) of rain on the Champlain Valley and western Vermont and 3–7 inches (76–178 mm) in the Green Mountains and eastern Vermont, with the risk of flooding near streams and rivers and an anticipated sustained wind speeds of 30–45 miles per hour (48–72 km/h) and gusts of up to 45–65 miles per hour (72–105 km/h), causing significant tree damage and damage to power lines.

In Maine, Governor Paul LePage declared a state of emergency on August 26, in preparation for the expected arrival of Hurricane Irene on August 28. Canadian utility and line workers were dispatched to Maine to assist in reinforcing the state's electrical infrastructure. Ten shelters were to be opened in Maine.

== Impact ==
Deaths and damage by region
Region	Direct	Indirect	Damage (USD)	Sources
Bahamas	None	None	$40 million	
Canada	None	1	$130 million	
Dominican Republic	5	None	$30 million	
Haiti	3	None	Unknown	
United States	40	8	$13.5 billion	
Puerto Rico	1	None	$500 million	
Totals:	49	9	$14.2 billion	

=== Lesser Antilles ===
Following its path through the northeastern Caribbean, Irene spread tropical storm conditions across all of the Leeward Islands, causing overall little damage but flooded some low-lying areas. To the south, strong thunderstorms and showers spread over Martinique, though most of the activity occurred prior to development into a tropical cyclone. In spite of the center tracking just north of Guadeloupe's island Grande-Terre, the strongest effects were brought on by Irene's outer rainbands. Tropical-storm-force winds generated brief rough seas, with peak wave heights of no more than 18 ft (5.5 m). Accompanying intermittent torrents swept through much of the territory, but overall rainfall was moderate; precipitation totals of between 3.1 and 4.7 in (79 and 119 mm) fell in Basse-Terre during the event. Due to the storm conditions, LIAT was forced to suspend all of its flights in Antigua for early August 22.

Passing near the British Virgin Islands while strengthening, Irene brought gusty winds and heavy precipitation to the territory; however, resultant property damage was minimal. A lightning strike over Necker Island sparked a large fire at one of business magnate Richard Branson's resort homes, but all of its guest occupants—including British actress Kate Winslet—were able to exit the area. Irene crossed Saint Croix, U.S. Virgin Islands as a strong tropical storm on August 21, though relatively calm winds associated with the passage of its center were recorded over the island. To the north in Saint Thomas, storm conditions became progressively worse; sustained gale-force winds swept across the territory, with a gust of up to 68 mph (109 km/h) recorded at 21:20 UTC. Upon impact, the winds and inclement weather caused scattered power outages across all islands. Wide-scale assessments confirmed light damage to public schools, mostly confined to debris and leaks.

=== Greater Antilles ===
==== Puerto Rico ====
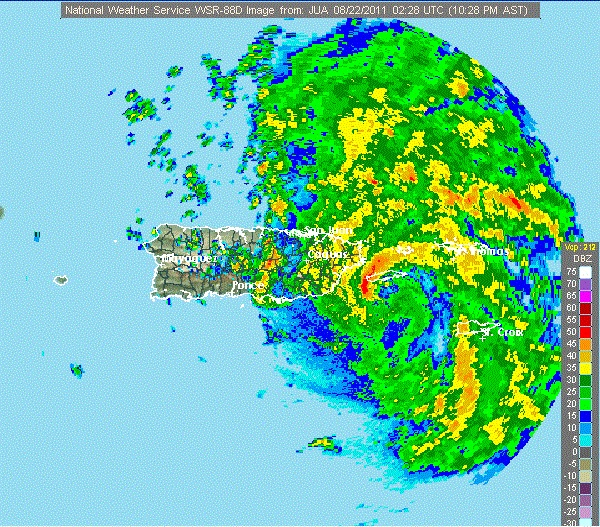
Last radar image of Irene from San Juan, before the radar went out

Across Puerto Rico, heavy rains caused extensive damage to roads while hurricane-force winds toppled many trees and utility poles, which led more than 1 million residences without power. President Barack Obama declared a state of emergency. About 121,000 customers were cut off from potable water service at the height of the storm. Across the territory at least 1,044 people had to take shelter, and 1,446 people in total were evacuated. At higher elevations, winds estimated by radar neared 111 mph (179 km/h). The highest amounts of precipitation fell across eastern parts of the territory; in Gurabo, a peak total of 22.04 in (560 mm) was recorded. Several rivers burst their banks as a consequence of the rains, causing additional flooding. The agricultural sector also suffered losses from the storm, particularly near the location of landfall. High winds uprooted crop plants, and several coffee and banana plantations sustained minor damage. Of the plantations, the most affected were situated in Yabucoa and Maunabo, where severe flooding washed out copious amounts of banana crop. The rains continued to fall for hours into the wake of the storm, prompting the issuance of flood watches. In total, Irene affected over 1,500 people in Puerto Rico, and one driver was killed after their vehicle was caught in swollen currents. Preliminary estimates indicate structural damage could be as high as $500 million (USD), with additional losses due to the three-day labor suspensions pinned at over $60.4 million (USD).

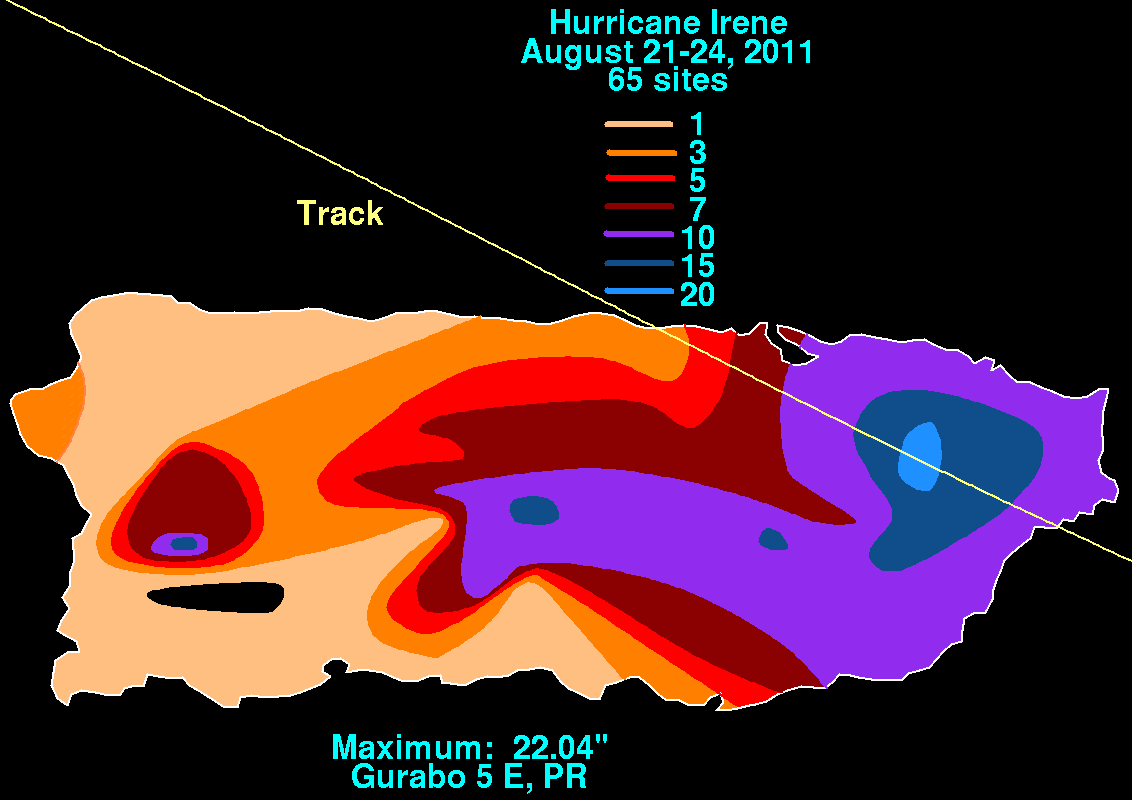
Hurricane Irene's rainfall across Puerto Rico

Offshore near Culebra Island, a sailboat was reported to have sunk due to rough seas prior to landfall in mainland Puerto Rico. Gale-force winds felled fences and shattered windows, with a flying object piercing through one residence. A total of 46 locals sought refuge to ride out the storm, but one family required post-storm shelter after the roof to their home was lost. On the island of Vieques, similar sustained winds of 51 mph (82 km/h) were recorded, as well as some gusts of up to 71 mph (114 km/h). The island was completely without power.

==== Hispaniola ====
Skirting barely north past Hispaniola, the large storm produced gales and prolonged precipitation in the Dominican Republic, displacing over 37,700 people and leaving at least 88 communities isolated in its wake. Accompanying storm surge affected roughly 200 homes and prompted evacuations along the northern coastlines. The strongest winds also occurred in northern Cibao, where they felled multiple trees and toppled utility poles. Swollen rivers, creeks, and streams caused widespread residential flooding and damage to roads; saturated soil in the region triggered mudslides, causing additional disruptions. Despite its distance, Irene produced extreme rainfall in southern parts of the country that led to many secondary effects. Resultant floods combined with two overflown rivers swept through much of San Cristóbal, causing one bridge to collapse under the rushing waters. The flooding produced at least two drown victims in that area, both later confirmed dead. Elsewhere, another fatality occurred in Cambita Garabitos, and six others were listed as missing. Heavy rains also fell across La Altagracia Province, where one person in Higüey went missing and hundreds were evacuated. Most of the damage in the region occurred due to flooded rivers, with some agricultural losses reported. The excess surface waters overwhelmed and damaged some 170 inlets. In all, Irene affected at least 2,292 households according to preliminary reports, with 16 houses rendered beyond repair. The associated monetary losses surmounted RD$1 billion (US$30 million) in the wake of the event.

In northeastern Haiti, the prolonged precipitation overflowed rivers and produced surface floods and damaging landslides across multiple road sections. About 500 residents in risk zones evacuated while some sought shelter, but only one of more than 160 evacuation sites required usage. Rough surge produced high coastal flooding, with some reports of thousands of damaged homes. In the vicinity of Port-au-Prince, brisk winds blew down many refuge tents home to victims from the major January 12, 2010, earthquake. Overall, officials indicated impact was less severe than initially feared; the storm only left isolated flood damage in its wake, particularly throughout northern parts of the country. However, two people lost their lives after being caught in swollen rivers, and four others suffered injuries.

==== Cuba ====
As Irene was tracking through the Bahamas, the outer bands of the storm dropped light rainfall in eastern Cuba. The cities of Moa and Sagua de Tánamo in Holguín Province reported 2.36 in (60 mm) of rain. However, the average rainfall throughout the Holguín Province did not exceed 0.20 in (5.1 mm). Some damage occurred throughout Guantánamo Province, where rough surf and rains caused flooding in Baracoa. In addition, waves of 10 to 12 feet (3.0 to 3.7 m) high were seen in Gibara, Holguín, on Wednesday 24, when Irene's eye was located between Acklins and Crooked Islands, Bahamas, just 178 miles (286 km) northeast of the city. The strong waves, combined with high tide, caused a slight coastal flooding.

=== Lucayan Archipelago ===
Hurricane Irene passing over the Bahamas on August 24

On August 24, Irene passed over the British Overseas Territory of Turks and Caicos Islands at Category 1 strength. The hurricane produced high winds that blew off roofs and downed power lines throughout the territory. In Cockburn Town, residences reported loss of power, and light poles were toppled. Many homes on Grand Turk Island also reported a loss of electricity during Irene's passage, although structural damage in the area was limited. The strongest of the rains and gusts occurred in Providenciales, where light wind damage was reported to roofs and resorts. The Grand Turk cruise port also sustained some minor damage from the storm, but operations resumed three days after impact.

A major hurricane, Irene trekked right through the Bahamas, with its eye making landfall on several of the islands. A peak wind gust of about 140 mph (230 km/h) was recorded at the height of the storm, and localized heavy rains of up to 13 inches (330 mm) fell in the area. The extreme winds damaged at least 40 homes on Mayaguana Island, and dozens of homes on Acklins were completely obliterated. On the latter island, the hurricane reportedly wiped out 90 percent of the Lovely Bay settlement. Similar winds tore off the roof and shattered the windows out of a high school on Crooked Island, where wind gusts as high as 99 mph (159 km/h) were reported. As well, a local church on the island partially collapsed due to the storm. The worst of the destruction occurred in Cat Island, characterized by widespread shattered glass and torn houses. In all, the storm caused "millions of dollars" worth in structural damage on the island, and left many homeless. Across New Providence and Grand Bahama, only limited impact occurred as Irene remained well offshore; businesses operations were scheduled to return to normal shortly after the storm. Nationwide, the damage was estimated at $40 million. Despite the overall extensive structural damage inflicted, there were no reports of fatalities on the islands in the wake of disaster.

=== United States ===
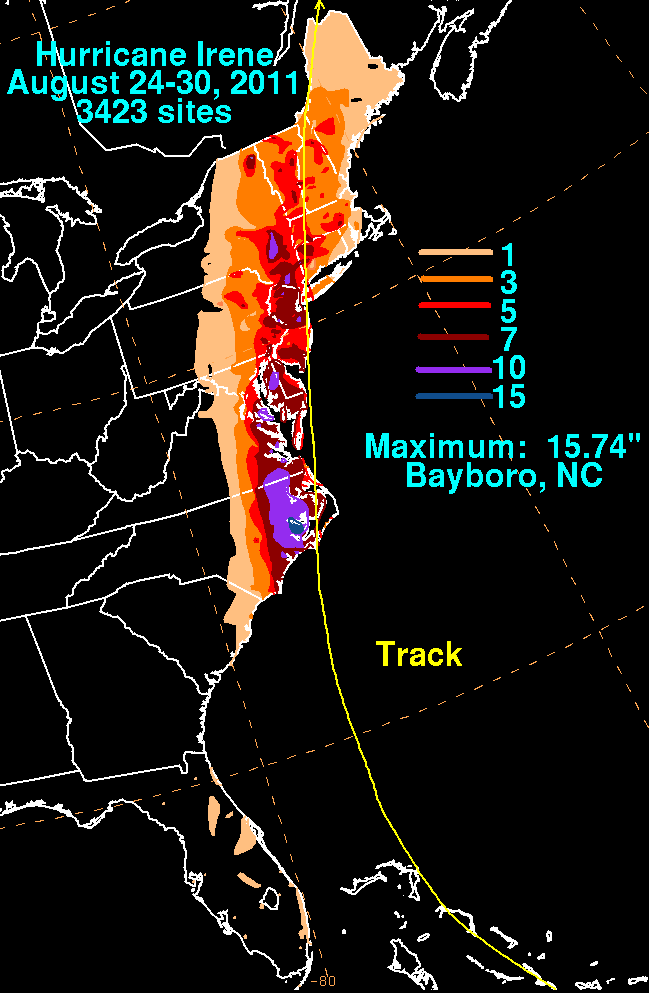
Storm total rainfall from Hurricane Irene

Gales from Irene affected nearly all of the Eastern Seaboard, extending from Florida to New England and as far inland as central New York and central Pennsylvania, affecting all or large parts of 15 states and the District of Columbia. The winds, combined with soil saturation due to the extreme amounts of precipitation in many of the impacted areas both from Irene and from previous thunderstorms, uprooted countless trees and power lines along the storm's path. Roughly 7.4 million homes and businesses lost electrical power, with approximately 3.3 million still without power as of August 30, three days after landfall. Coastal areas suffered extensive flood damage following its potent storm surge, with additional freshwater flooding reported in many areas. The storm spawned scattered tornadoes, causing significant property damage as evidenced by destroyed homes. In the northeastern region, more than ten rivers measured record flood heights at their hydrographs. Rivers in at least six Northeastern states reached hundred-year flood levels, while the flooding in Greene County, New York was described as five-hundred-year-flood conditions. Flooding in Schoharie County, New York was also reported by the National Weather Service in Albany, New York as five-hundred-year-flood conditions. Throughout its path in the contiguous United States, Irene caused approximately $13.5 billion (2011 USD) in damage and 47 deaths.

==== Southeast ====
Though Irene spared Florida from a direct hit, its outermost rainbands produced squalls and intermittent torrents along the state's eastern coastlines. Brisk winds produced scattered power outages and waves reaching as high as 12 ft (3.7 m); rough surf in the Boynton Inlet injured at least eight people, and two surfers were killed offshore Volusia County. Elsewhere, in Lantana, large waves sweeping over seawalls went on to destroy a lifeguard tower. Localized beach erosion was also reported, although it was not significant. Onshore, comparatively light winds brushed the state; the Lake Worth pier reporting a peak gust of 40 mph (64 km/h), with the Palm Beach International Airport recording winds of no more than 31 mph (50 km/h). Precipitation in the area was also light, with a peak accumulation of 2.67 inches (68 mm) recorded at Fort Lauderdale Executive Airport. Further north, rainfall from the storm totaled no more than 1.31 inches (33 mm) on August 24 in Melbourne.

Owing to its unusually large windfield, Irene affected long stretches of South Carolina coastlines with gusts and sporadic heavy showers, even though it remained offshore. Gale-force winds picked up through the Lowcountry during the afternoon of August 26, with a gust of 55 mph (89 km/h) measured at a coastal marine observing site on Folly Island. Scattered power outages left over 4,000 residences in the dark, mostly due to toppled utility poles. The winds also felled trees and generated rough surf along Charleston County coastlines, and minor beach erosion was noted. Elsewhere in that county, a downed tree trapped several people in their vehicle, but they were all rescued. Less than $5 million in insured damage occurred across the state.

Tropical-storm-force winds began to affect the Outer Banks hours before landfall, producing waves of 6–9 ft (1.8–2.7 m). In addition to the gales, Irene spawned several tornadoes early on August 27, while approaching the coast. No regular weather station or buoy, however, measured sustained hurricane-force winds from the storm, with the highest winds officially recorded at 67 mph (108 km/h) by a buoy near Cape Lookout. Precipitation totals from Irene in the region were particularly high, ranging between 10–14 inches (250–360 mm); Bunyan recorded a peak amount of approximately 14 inches (360 mm). The large hurricane left extensive damage in its wake and produced three tornadoes that damaged homes and overturned vehicles. Following the touch down of a strong EF2 tornado, at least four homes were demolished in Columbia, while up to three others sustained significant damage. Two other EF1 tornadoes were also confirmed. The hurricane caused multiple flooded areas and uprooted trees along coastlines; in Nash County, a snatched tree limb struck and killed one person. Prior to the storm, a resident in Onslow County suffered a fatal heart attack while applying plywood to his house. Two people in Pitt and Sampson Counties were additionally killed by falling trees, as were two others in Goldsboro and Pitt County in traffic accidents. A man also drowned in the flooded Cape Fear River. All in all, over 1,100 homes were destroyed. The estimated $71 million in damage did not include agricultural losses. Hurricane Irene cut several breaches across NC 12 on Hatteras Island, isolating the island from the rest of the Outer Banks. Several of the smaller breaches were filled in with sand, but the largest, which is 200 feet (61 m) wide, was left open, recreating Pea Island for the first time since 1945. As a result, the only way to access Hatteras Island was by ferry. Total damage in North Carolina reached $740 million.

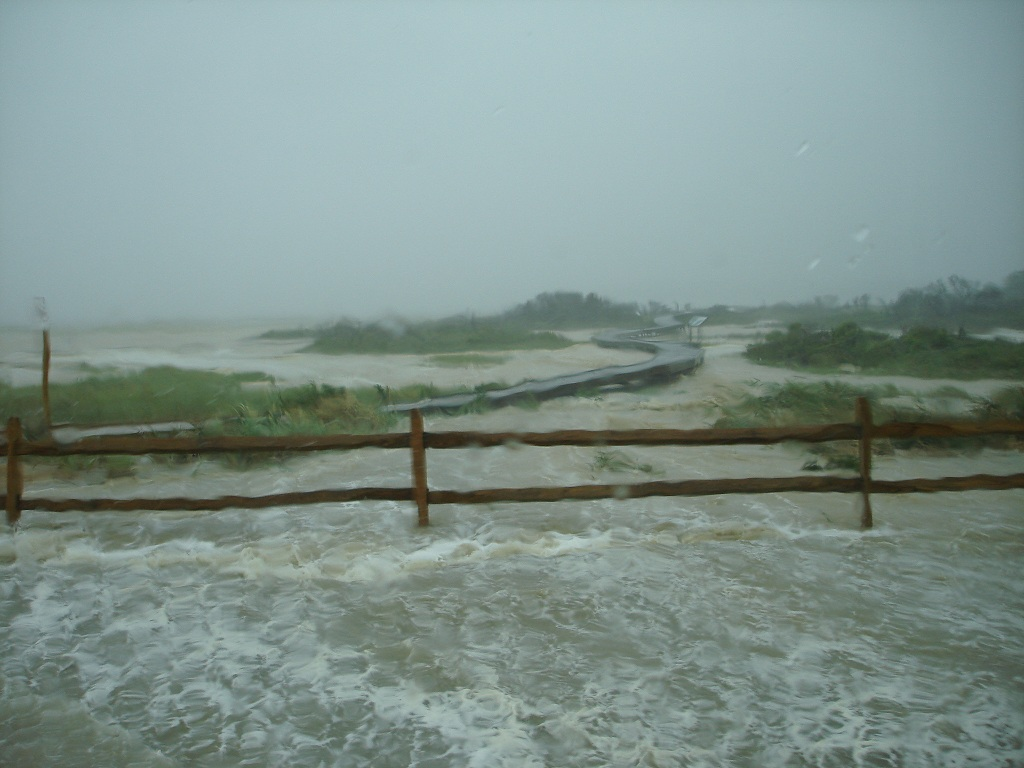
Flooding at Chincoteague National Wildlife Refuge on Assateague Island

An EF0 tornado moved through the Sandbridge community in Virginia Beach, in the morning hours of August 27, ripping the roofs off at least five homes and damaging several others. Another EF0 tornado occurred near Chincoteague, causing minor roof and tree damage. High winds in Newport News knocked a tree into an apartment complex. Three other Virginians in Brunswick, Chesterfield and King William Counties were also killed by falling trees. Most severe damage consisted of many downed trees on power lines, cars, homes, and roads; and flooding in many low-lying roads and neighborhoods – 1.2 million homes and businesses lost power due to Irene. Following the storm, Scientific American conducted a study if the passage of Irene was connected to increased aftershocks following the 2011 Virginia earthquake.

==== Mid-Atlantic ====
Hurricane Irene caused widespread power outages in Delaware, Maryland, New Jersey, Pennsylvania, and Washington, D.C. Dorchester General Hospital in Cambridge was evacuated after there was wind and water damage to the laboratory roof. In Queen Anne's County, Maryland, an 85-year-old woman was killed when a tree fell onto her house causing the chimney to collapse. Farm fields on the Eastern Shore of Maryland were saturated with water after the storm, causing farmers to hand-pick their crops. Some tomato, corn, and cantaloupe crops were destroyed. Over 800,000 customers in the state lost power.

In Delaware, two 25-year-old men were killed in the Hockessin area in an apparent drowning after attempting to run home through the storm on Saturday night. Their bodies were recovered near Wilmington on Monday afternoon. An EF1 tornado touched down in Lewes, causing a path of destruction 80 yd-wide (73 m) and 0.75 mi-long (1.21 km), damaging about 50 homes and destroying one. Heavy rains throughout the state were topped at 10.43 inches (265 mm) in Ellendale. Flooding occurred in many areas including the Delaware Bay communities of Slaughter Beach, Primehook Beach, and Broadkill Beach. Sections of Prime Hook Road leading to Primehook Beach were washed out. Irene flooded and forced the closure of DE 1 near the Indian River Inlet Bridge, pushing sand onto the road. Around 50,000 people in the state lost power.

Five people were killed in Pennsylvania: three died as a result of fallen trees, one was killed in a traffic accident, and a woman was swept away by flooding in the Wissahickon Creek. In Philadelphia, the storm left thousands without power. More than 400 trees fell in Philadelphia, and 200 trees fell in Pittsburgh, seven buildings collapsed and twenty roads were closed. PECO worked on restoring power by mid-week. Wind gusts reached 54 mph (87 km/h) at Philadelphia International Airport, and rainfall totals reached 5.7 in (140 mm). Over 11,800 flights at the airport were canceled. Near Forkston, the rains caused flash flooding that entered about 100 houses, with 25 roads washed out. Two people required rescue from the floodwaters. Damage across Wyoming County was estimated at over $23 million. About 50,000 people lost power.

===== New Jersey =====
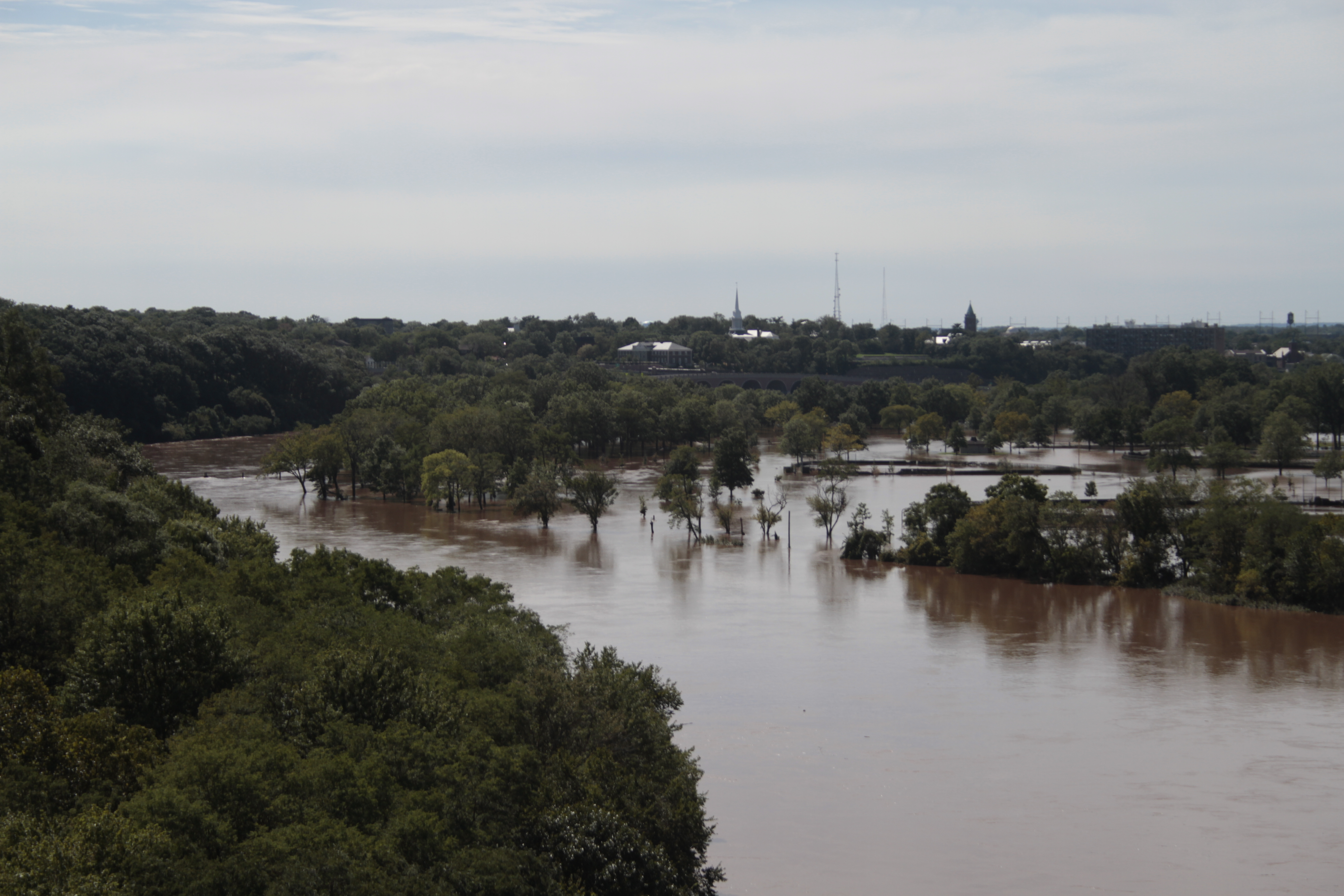
The Raritan River at New Brunswick on August 29, 2011, one day after Hurricane Irene landfall

While the storm made landfall next to Galloway and Little Egg Harbor in the southeastern part of the state, South Jersey received little damage and flooding. Further north, severe river flooding occurred due to record rainfall, with a statewide rainfall maxima of 11.27 inches (286 mm) in Freehold. Eleven rivers reached record levels, and a week after the storm all rivers in the state remained at "moderate flooding level". The flooding affected roads, including the heavily used I-287 and Garden State Parkway. Along the Hudson River, floodwaters affected parts of Jersey City and Hoboken. The north tube of the Holland Tunnel was briefly closed. Flooding affected the train lines in the Trenton area. The storm killed seven people in the state, and damage was estimated at $1 billion.

An EF0 tornado also knocked down trees and power poles in Robbinsville Township. In total, approximately 1.46 million customers of JCP&L and PSEG throughout most of the 21 counties lost power. On Sunday September 5, power had been returned to last remaining 2,000 residents who suffered a power outage.

Flooding in some parts of the state continued for another three days. On August 31, Paterson counted 6,000 displaced persons, and three of four bridges crossing the Passaic River remained closed. On August 31, President Barack Obama declared the state a disaster area, including all 21 counties. More than 31,000 residents filed assistance claims through FEMA, and within two weeks nearly $38 million had been disbursed with others pending. Hardest-hit counties were Bergen and Passaic in the northeast, each with more than 4,000 claims.

===== New York =====
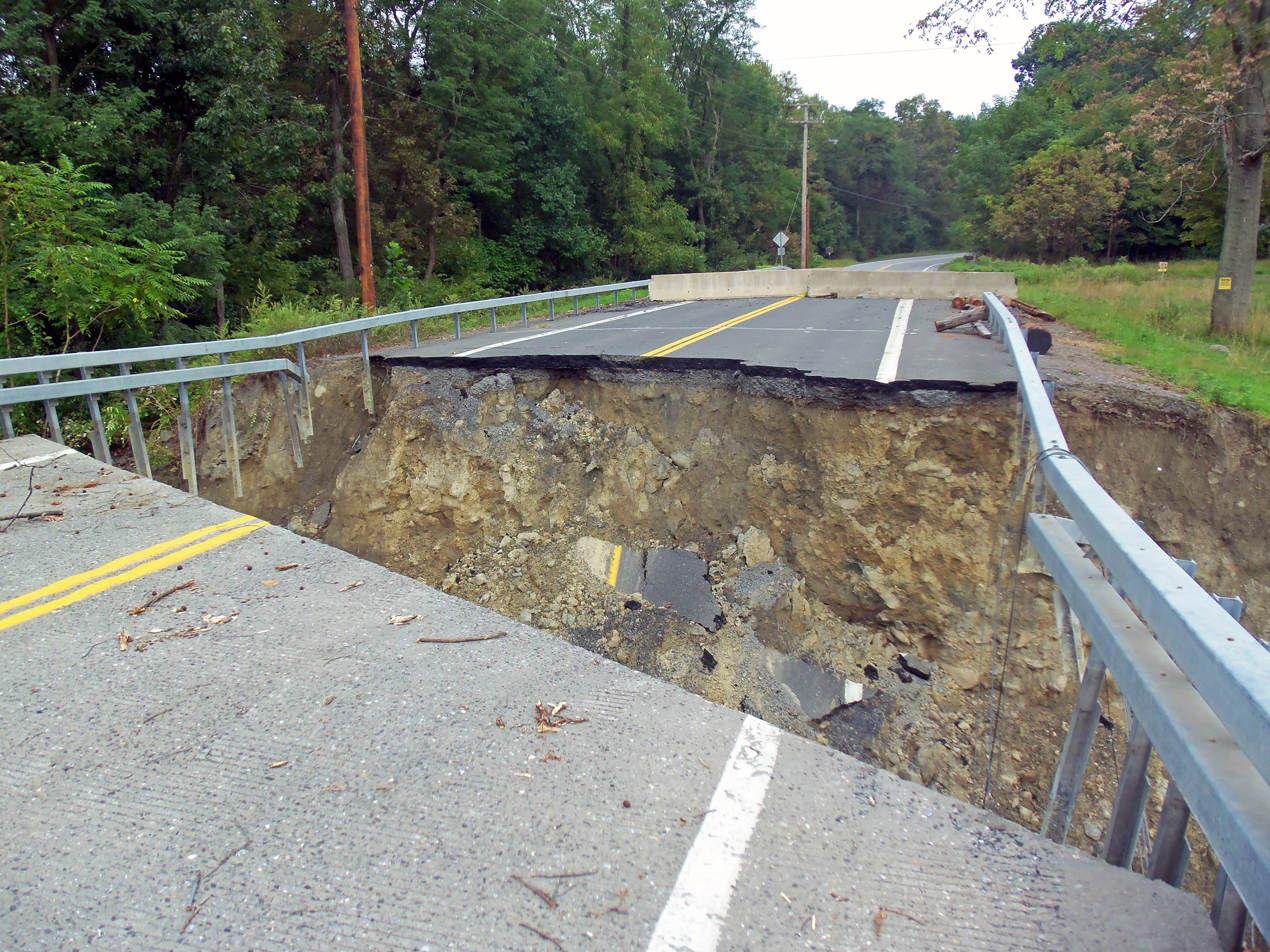
A road washout in New Windsor

In Manhattan, the Hudson River flooded in the Meatpacking District. Long Beach and Freeport, both of which experienced serious flooding, were among the worst-hit towns on Long Island, and many roads were left impassable. The workers at Ground Zero in Lower Manhattan worked to make the World Trade Center site hurricane proof, and escaped major damage, just missing the tenth anniversary of 9/11. A weak, brief EF0 tornado also touched down in Queens. A weak EF0 tornado also moved through the West Islip area.

Flooding of the Ramapo River and more than a half-mile (1 km) of washouts led both Metro-North and NJ Transit to suspend service on the Port Jervis Line north of Suffern for nearly three months.

Flooding by Schoharie Creek in the village of Prattsville, NY caused major damage and destroyed large areas of the village. Eleven houses collapsed in the flood, fifteen were condemned and torn down, and more than 100 homes were so damaged that the residents couldn't return to them, but amazingly there were zero fatalities. It received widespread national news coverage because the village had nearly been washed away.

Further upstate, Irene did significant damage in the Adirondack Mountains. A section of NY 73 was washed out, isolating two hamlets. Overall, there were ten deaths in the state, most due to flooding.

On September 3, Governor Cuomo announced the creation of a $15 million federal relief fund to help farmers there cope with the damage, after an estimated $45 million in crop damage on 145,000 acres (59,000 ha).

==== New England ====
===== Southern New England =====
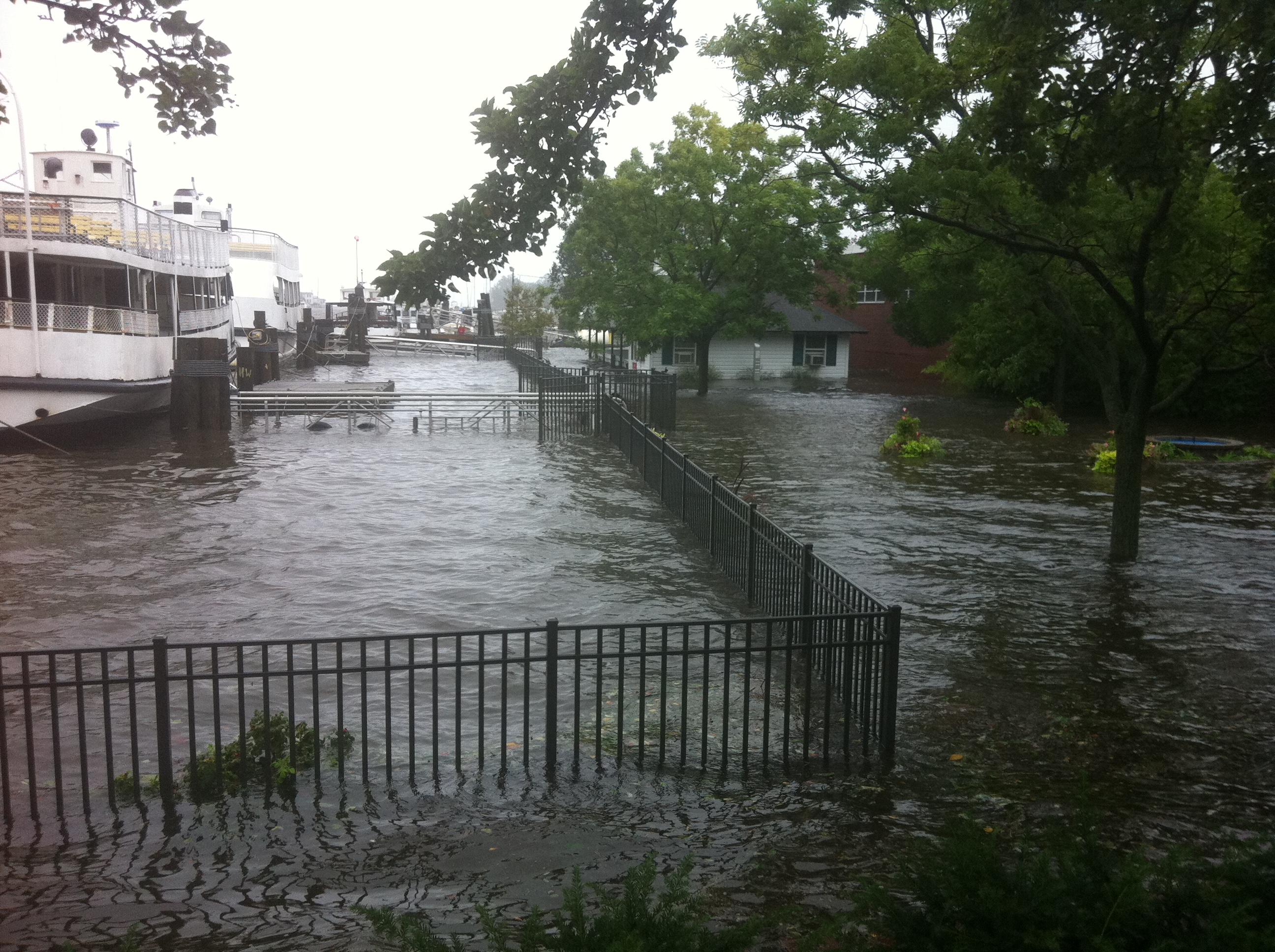
Storm surge from Hurricane Irene in Greenwich, Connecticut

In Connecticut, 20 homes in East Haven were destroyed and five others were damaged beyond repair by flooding and storm surge along the shore of Long Island Sound. On Sunday, Connecticut's two main electric companies, Connecticut Light and Power and United Illuminating, reported that a record 754,000 customers, about half the state, were without power. More than two days after the storm made landfall, about 400,000 people were still without power, some being told they would have to wait more than a week, especially in heavily wooded areas. In Ridgefield, 90% of houses lost power, requiring the utility to turn off power to the other 10% to ease restoration efforts. Route 15, one of the state's main highways, was closed from the New York state line to Interstate 91 in Meriden due to fallen trees.

Governor Dannel Malloy said Hurricane Irene was responsible for a tenth death on August 28: a man who died in a fire likely caused by downed wires from high winds. An elderly woman, who resided in Prospect, died in similar situations, when a falling tree caused power lines to collapse onto her home, starting a fire; her husband was critically injured. In Bristol, a man drowned when his canoe capsized.

A week later, many homes in Connecticut still had not had their power restored. Connecticut Light & Power said on September 2 that it was ahead of where it expected to be, and that less than 100,000 customers would still be without power by midnight the next day. Crews had come from many distant places in North America, including British Columbia, to help the utility's own crews. The continued outages also meant that in rural areas with private wells, residents still lacked running water a week after the storm.

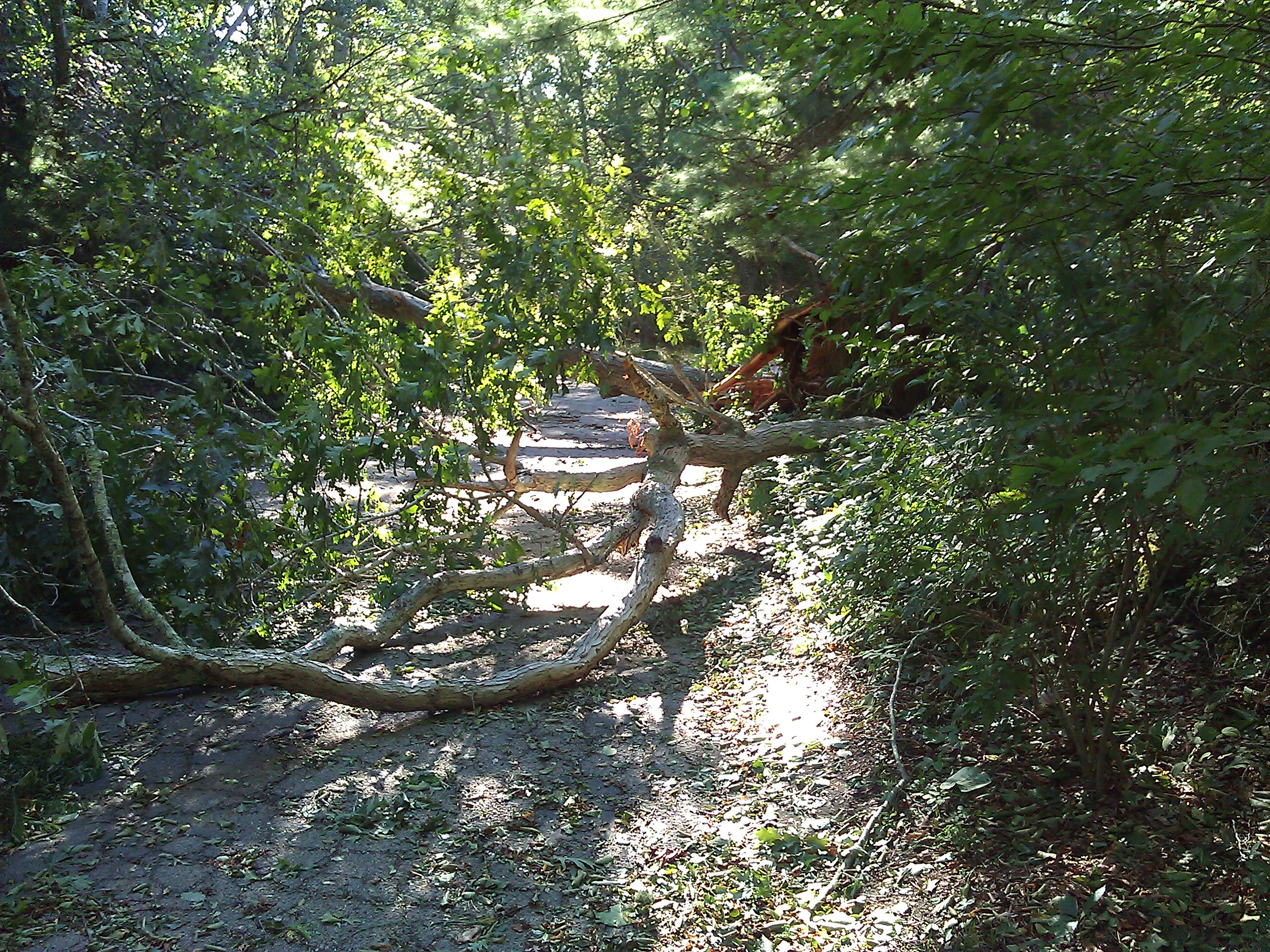
Two trees toppled by Irene in coastal Massachusetts

High winds toppled trees and heavy rain caused widespread flooding of Connecticut River tributaries. The Westfield River rose almost twenty feet in a matter of hours; the Deerfield River rose over fifteen feet in the same period. Both rivers reached flood stages not seen since the 1955, and 1938, hurricanes and floods. A 6-mile stretch of Route 2 from Charlemont to Florida along the Cold River branch of the Deerfield was closed due to damage for over 3 months. A public works employee was electrocuted by downed power lines in Southbridge. A dam failure was mistakenly reported in East Becket, yet 200 people were evacuated as a precaution.

Rhode Island had gusts of wind up to 71 mph (114 km/h), uprooting trees and causing extensive damage to its power grid. By the storm's end, an estimated 256,000 out of 480,281 customers were without power. Rhode Island electric company, National Grid, expected it would take until Labor Day weekend to restore power to the most remote areas and areas which were most damaged. On August 30, two days after the storm, 138,000 customers remained without power. A power line on Aquidneck Island near Portsmouth was felled by winds during the morning of August 28, severing power to Portsmouth, Middletown, Newport and Jamestown. Power was not fully restored to Aquidneck Island and Conanicut Island communities until August 30. The storm surge into Narragansett Bay caused some coastal damage, although Providence, at the head of the bay, was spared downtown flooding in part due to its hurricane barrier. There was some localized river flooding, however being on the eastern side of the storm, most of the damage came in the form of wind.

===== Northern New England =====
Heavy rainfall of up to 11 in (280 mm) resulted in almost every river and stream in Vermont flooding, resulting in at least three deaths and one missing. In Wilmington, the flood level of the Deerfield River east branch reportedly exceeded levels measured during the 1938 New England hurricane – the only other tropical cyclone to make a direct hit on Vermont in the state's recorded history. Throughout Vermont, numerous covered bridges, many over 100 years old, were damaged or destroyed. Extensive road damage resulted in the isolation of over a dozen rural towns that would require helicopter air-lifts of necessities in the days immediately following the storm. The storm decimated multiple sections of U.S. Route 4 between Rutland and Quechee, making east/west travel through the central part of state nearly impossible. The resort town of Killington as well as neighboring Pittsfield were completely isolated from travel in and out for two weeks. Statewide, the cost of repairs for road and bridge damage alone was estimated to exceed $700 million. According to the National Climatic Data Center, total damage in the state of Vermont exceeded $1.3 billion.

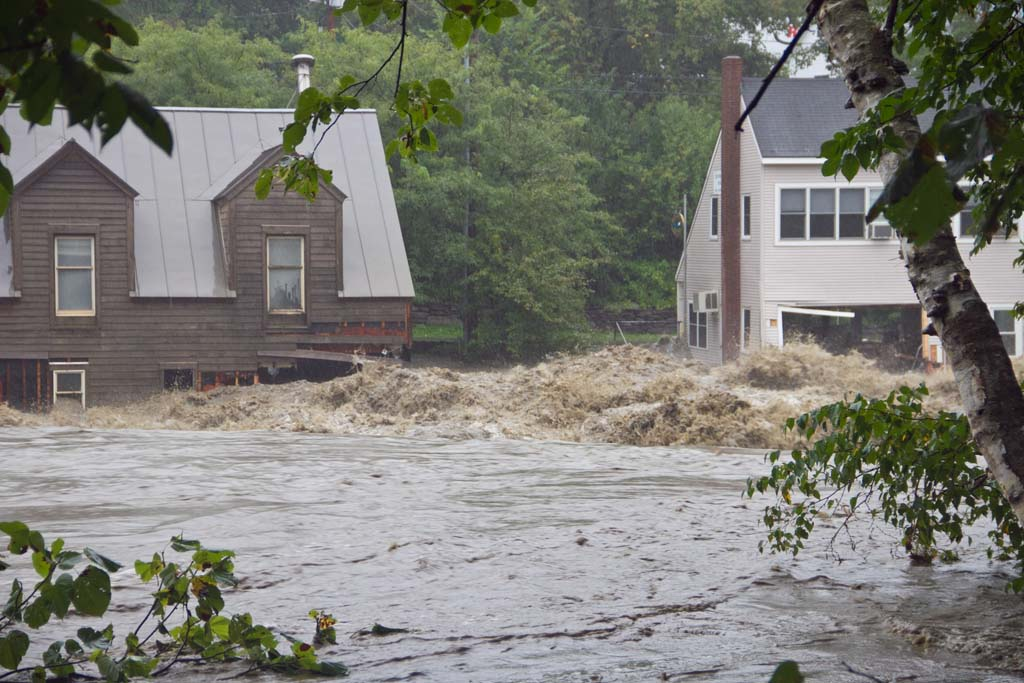
Flood waters from Tropical Storm Irene on the Ottauquechee River in Quechee, Vermont.

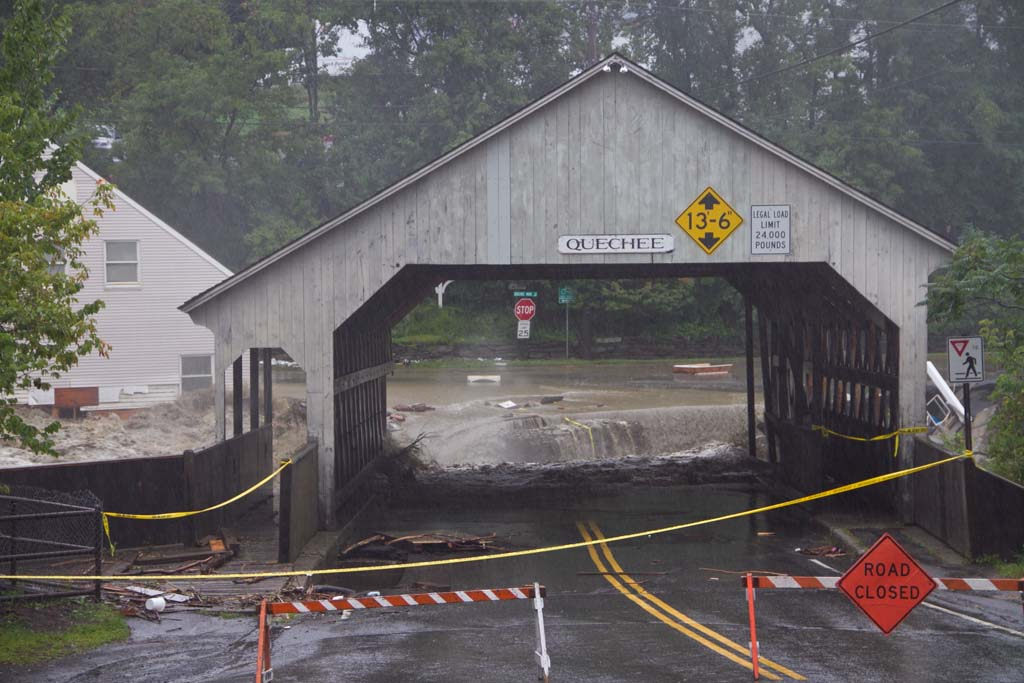
Flood waters on the Ottauquechee River in Quechee scouring the approach to the covered bridge, opposite side.

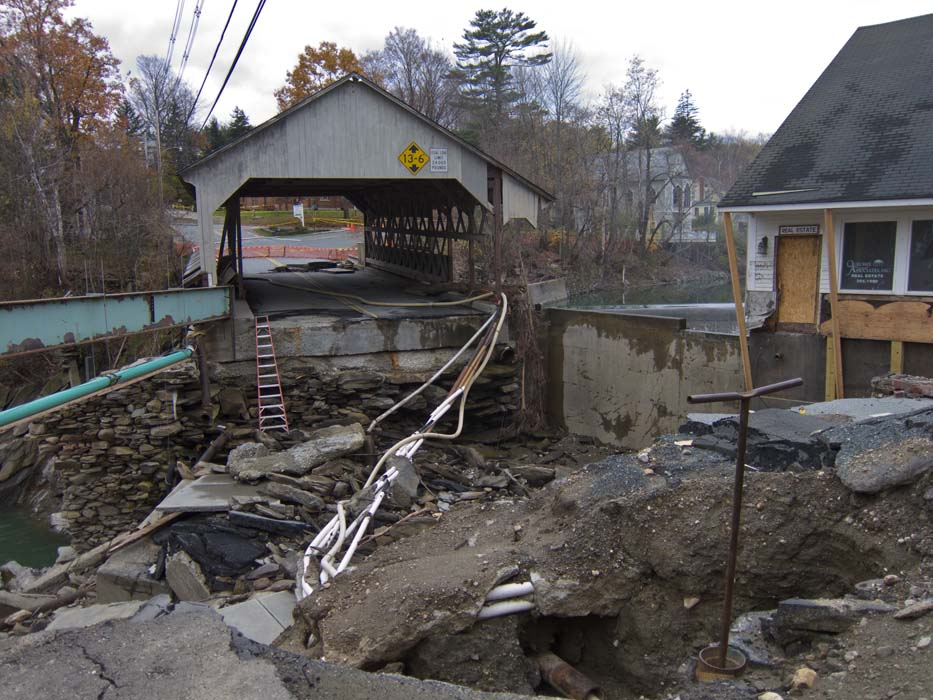
Damage caused by flood waters to the Quechee covered bridge on the northern shore of the river.

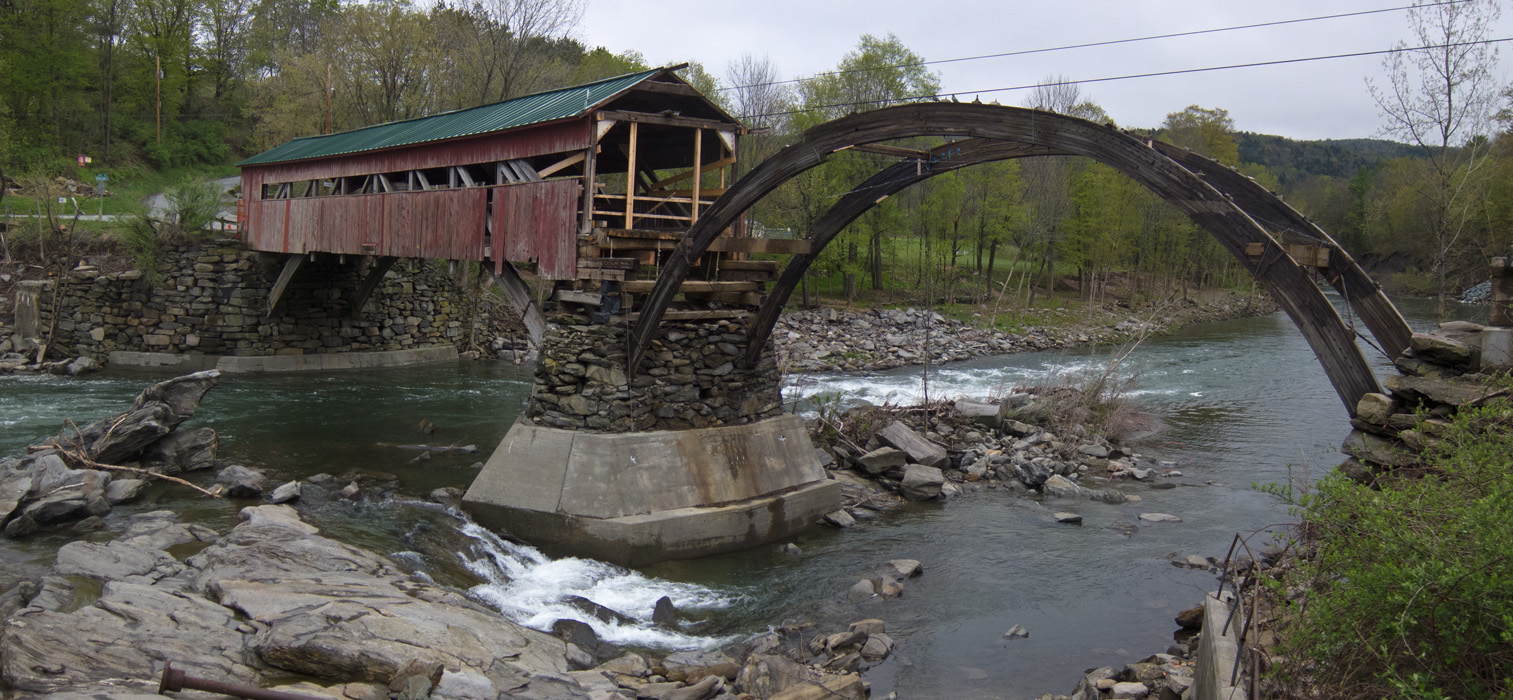
Damage caused by flood waters on the Ottauquechee River to the Taftsville bridge.

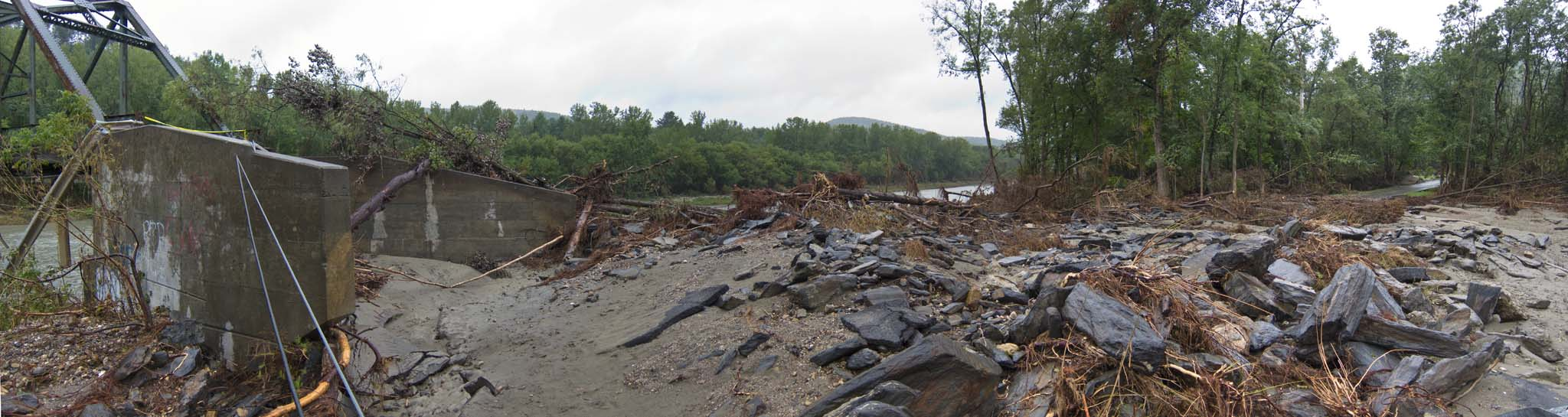
Damage caused by flood waters on the White River to the Royalton, Vermont bridge.

In New Hampshire, winds gusted to 63 mph (101 km/h) in Portsmouth and 120 mph (190 km/h) atop Mount Washington. Heavy rainfall also fell across the state, peaking at 7.35 in (187 mm) at Mount Washington. The heavy rainfall lead to high river crests across the state, which resulted in $6.5 million in Gorham alone. The storm resulted in one fatality and three injuries across the state, as well as $17 million in damage, with $9 million being in road damage alone. In addition, over 175,000 people across the state lost power.

Tropical storm conditions occurred throughout the state of Maine during Irene's passage. Flooding caused by Irene's heavy rainfall washed out two bridges on State Route 27 in Carrabassett Valley. Wind gusts in the state reached 64 mph (103 km/h) in Turner. Nearly 6 in (150 mm) of rain fell in Andover. Over 200,000 customers in the state lost power.

=== Canada ===
Hurricane Irene's remnants on August 30, in the process of being absorbed by another system.

Irene also affected a large section of Canada, stretching from the Eastern Ontario to the coasts of Newfoundland and Labrador. On August 28, in Quebec, high winds (more than 110 kilometres per hour (68 mph) in some places) and heavy rainfall from post-tropical storm Irene knocked out power to over 250,000 homes, felled tree branches, and damaged buildings and traffic signals across Montreal. One person was killed after a road was washed out and cars were swept into the Yamaska River near Sorel-Tracy; another section of road in Charlevoix was also washed out, while flooding forced evacuations in Estrie. In New Brunswick, many trees fell in the wake of the hurricane, mainly due to the strong winds associated with the storm. Heavy rain also fell throughout the province, peaking at 83 mm (3.3 in) in Fredericton. Power was lost to an estimated 75,000 – 200,000 New Brunswick residents, directly due to the gale-force winds. In Nova Scotia, over 8,000 people lost power. Insured damage in Canada was estimated at $130 million.

== Aftermath ==
=== Southeast ===
North Carolina Highway 12 did not re-open until October 10, requiring residents to leave on a ferry. As a result, the Captain Richard Etheridge Bridge was re-opened due to a new inlet that Irene created. Coastal restoration was not completed until April 2013. On September 19, 2011, the United States Department of Labor granted $2 million to North Carolina in the recovery of Irene.

=== Mid-Atlantic ===
In the Allentown, Pennsylvania metropolitan area, over 428,000 customers lost power after Irene, and restorations led to $32 million in economic losses. The storm become one of the top-5 for power outages at all stations across Pennsylvania. In addition, several orchards sustained severe damage in Pennsylvania, resulting in many fruits, particularly apples falling to the ground during the storm. Following the storm, Tropical Storm Lee complicated damage in the aftermath of Irene. Following the storm, Philadelphia received federal aid from FEMA.

In the state of Maryland, heavy rain led to runoff in the Chesapeake Bay, leading to algal blooms that reduced oxygen levels and led to several aquatic mammals dying off.

=== New England ===
==== Connecticut ====
Following Irene's passage on August 28, Governor Dannel P. Malloy and Lieutenant Governor Nancy Wyman began viewing damage from the storm in West Haven and East Haven. The governor also made a public briefing that evening to residents from the emergency operations center. Later on August 28, it was announced that all non-essential employees were to return to work the following day unless their workplace was without power. In light of severe damage across state parks, beaches and campgrounds, most facilities were kept closed through September 1 and some until September 2. Following a fuel assessment by Department of Consumer Protection Commissioner William M. Rubenstein, residents were advised that although there was a sufficient amount of gasoline available, lack of distribution centers would limit the amount that could be purchased. As a result, Rubenstein suggested limited driving until services were restored.

On August 31, a state-run donation center was set up for residents affected by the storm. On September 1, officials from the Federal Emergency Management Agency (FEMA) began touring the hardest hit areas of the state. The Department of Motor Vehicles announced that residents with licenses expiring between August 27 and September 12 would be allowed to delay license renewal until September 12 without late fees.

On September 2, Governor Malloy announced that $1 million in federal funds would be available for transportation infrastructure repairs. The Connecticut Department of Transportation also estimated that cleanup costs across the state would reach $5 million. Later that day, President Barack Obama signed a disaster declaration for Connecticut, allowing federal aid to be distributed throughout the state for recovery efforts. Following further FEMA assessments, it was deemed that all eight counties of Connecticut were eligible for disaster assistance on September 4. On September 7, nine FEMA disaster recovery centers opened up across the state to assist residents and businesses with losses.

Once the initial disaster response plan had been completed, the state Government created a panel on September 13, known as the State Team Organized for the Review of Management of Irene (S.T.O.R.M. Irene), to assess how the state prepared for, handled, and was recovering from the hurricane.

==== Vermont ====
Relief concerts were organized by local Vermont bands such as Phish and Grace Potter and the Nocturnals. By December the state was recovering more quickly than originally expected. Within a month of the storm 84 of 118 closed sections of state highway, and 28 of 34 bridges, had been reopened. The state had relied on assistance from National Guard units in eight other states, and highway workers lent to it by New Hampshire and Maine. "We'll do the work and we'll figure out how we're paying for it," said deputy state secretary of transportation Sue Minter, "but we're not waiting." Repair costs ultimately turned out to be $175–200 million, with most of it covered by federal disaster relief.

== Retirement ==
On account of the high death toll and extensive damage caused by the storm, the name Irene was retired by the World Meteorological Organization in April 2012, and will never again be used for an Atlantic tropical cyclone. It was replaced for the 2017 season with Irma.

== See also ==
- 1806 Great Coastal hurricane
- 1821 Norfolk and Long Island hurricane
- 1938 New England hurricane
- Hurricane Carol (1954)
- Hurricane Connie (1955)
- Hurricane Diane (1955)
- Hurricane Gloria (1985)
- Hurricane Bob (1991)
- Hurricane Floyd (1999)
- Hurricane Isabel (2003)
- Hurricane Sandy (2012)
- Hurricane Isaias (2020)
- List of New England hurricanes
- List of New York hurricanes
- List of New Jersey hurricanes
- List of Pennsylvania hurricanes
- List of Delaware hurricanes
- List of Maryland hurricanes
- List of Canada hurricanes
- List of costliest Atlantic hurricanes
- List of retired Atlantic hurricane names
- List of Category 3 Atlantic hurricanes
