= Pea Island National Wildlife Refuge =

National Wildlife Refuge in North Carolina, United States

- IUCN category IV (habitat/species management area)
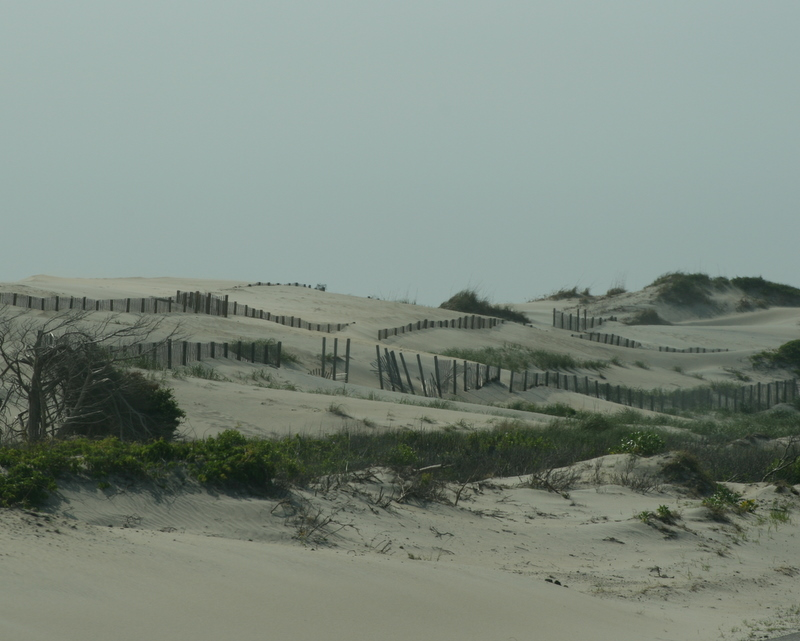
- Dunes on NC 12 in June 2007

- Location within the United States Location within North Carolina
- Location: Dare County, North Carolina, United States
- Nearest city: Nags Head, North Carolina
- Coordinates: 35°43′N 75°30′W
- Area: 31,534 acres (127.61 km^{2})
- Established: 1938
- Governing body: U.S. Fish and Wildlife Service
- Website: Pea Island National Wildlife Refuge

Pea Island National Wildlife Refuge is a national wildlife refuge located on North Carolina's Pea Island, a coastal barrier island in Rodanthe, and part of a chain of islands known as the Outer Banks, adjacent to Cape Hatteras National Seashore. The sanctuary is located 10 miles (16 km) south of Nags Head, North Carolina on NC 12.

The refuge's objectives are to provide nesting, resting, and wintering habitat for migratory birds, including the greater snow geese and other migratory waterfowl, shorebirds, wading birds, raptors, and neotropical migrants, as well as habitat and protection for endangered and threatened species. Objectives also include providing opportunities for public enjoyment of wildlife and wildlands resources. Public use programs focus on interpretation, environmental education, wildlife observation, wildlife photography, and fishing.

== Refuge facts ==
The refuge was established May 17, 1937. It includes 5,834 acres (23.6 km^{2}) of land and 25,700 acres (104 km^{2}) Proclamation Boundary Waters. The refuge is approximately 13 miles (21 km) long (north to south) and ranges from a 1/4 mile (0.40 km) to 1 mile (1.6 km) wide (from east to west).

The refuge is administered by the Alligator River National Wildlife Refuge as a part of a refuge complex; the manager of the Alligator River refuge supervises the managers of the Mackay Island, Currituck, and Pocosin Lakes National Wildlife Refuges. The Comprehensive Conservation Management Plan for the refuge was completed in September 2006. A 36-person staff administers both Pea Island and Alligator River National Wildlife Refuges, with a budget of $2,827K (FY 03) for both refuges. Numerous volunteers devote approximately 35,000 hours each year to the refuge.

There are 2.7 million visitors annually. Pea Island National Wildlife Refuge is known as a "birder's paradise"; birders make up some of the many visitors. Other eco-tourists include canoeists and kayakers, beachcombers, surf and sound anglers, and nature photographers.

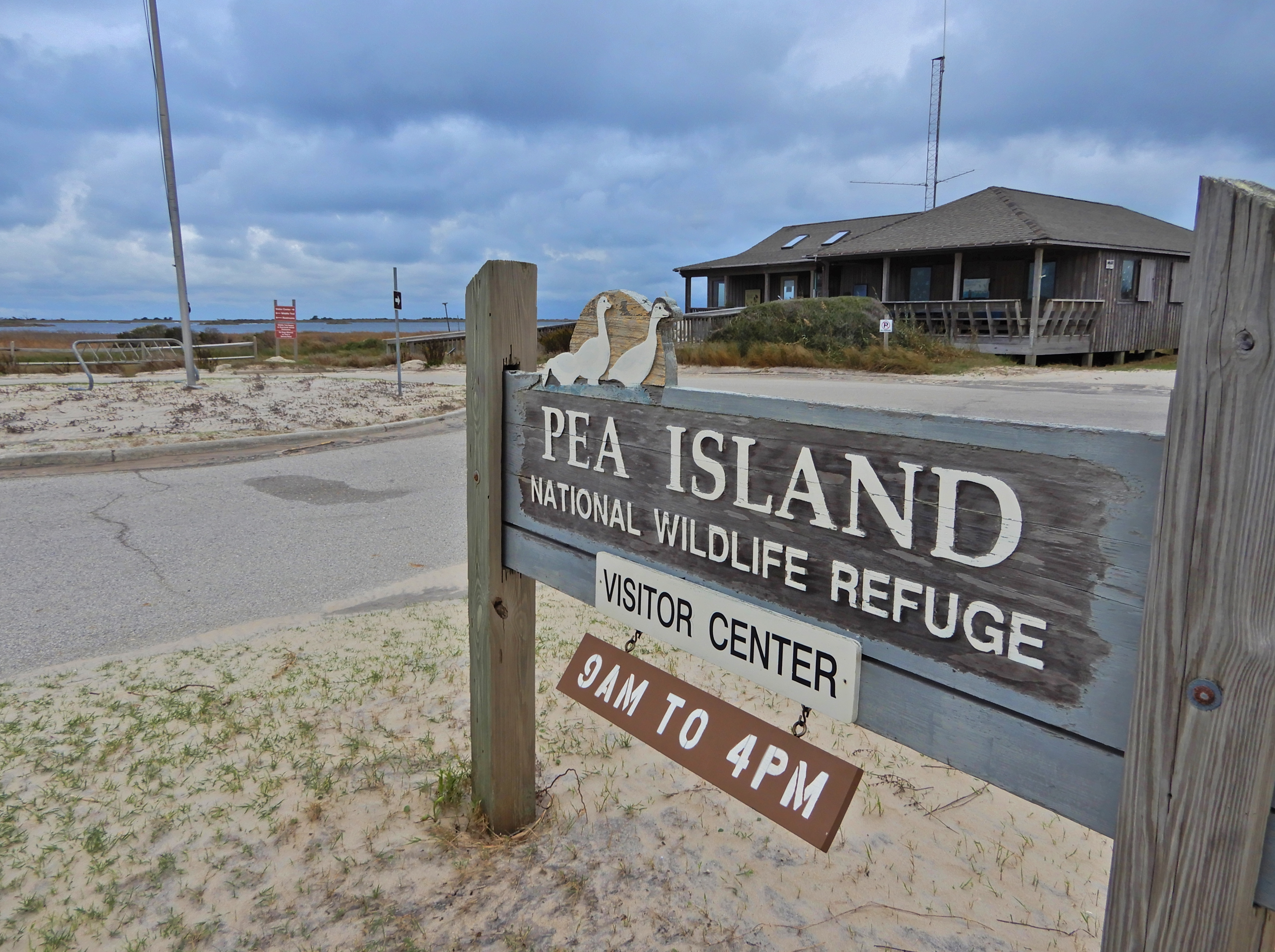
Peal Island NWR Visitor Center

== Natural history ==
The refuge contains ocean beach, dunes, upland, fresh and brackish water ponds, salt flats, and salt marsh. There are more than 365 species of birds, 25 species of mammals, 24 species of reptiles, and 5 species of amphibians. There are concentrations of ducks, geese, swans, wading birds, shorebirds, and raptors. There are neotropical migrants that are seasonally abundant on the refuge. The refuge has 1,000 acres (4 km^{2}) of manageable waterfowl impoundments, and there are several shorebird nesting areas and wading bird rookeries are located in the refuge.

Endangered and threatened species include shortnose sturgeon, red wolf, loggerhead sea turtles, green sea turtle, leatherback sea turtle, hawksbill sea turtle, Kemp's ridley sea turtle, red-cockaded woodpecker, roseate tern, West Indian manatee, seabeach amaranth, and piping plovers.

The refuge area was historically used for market waterfowl hunting, commercial fishing, farming, and livestock operations.

== Climate ==
According to the Trewartha climate classification system, Pea Island National Wildlife Refuge, North Carolina has a humid subtropical climate with hot and humid summers, cool winters and year-around precipitation (Cfak). Cfak climates are characterized by all months having an average mean temperature > 32.0 °F (> 0.0 °C), at least eight months with an average mean temperature ≥ 50.0 °F (≥ 10.0 °C), at least one month with an average mean temperature ≥ 71.6 °F (≥ 22.0 °C) and no significant precipitation difference between seasons. During the summer months in Pea Island National Wildlife Refuge, a cooling afternoon sea breeze is present on most days, but episodes of extreme heat and humidity can occur with heat index values ≥ 100 °F (≥ 38 °C). Pea Island National Wildlife Refuge is prone to hurricane strikes, particularly during the Atlantic hurricane season which extends from June 1 through November 30, sharply peaking from late August through September. During the winter months, episodes of cold and wind can occur with wind chill values < 10 °F (< -12 °C). The plant hardiness zone at Pea Island National Wildlife Refuge is 8b with an average annual extreme minimum air temperature of 16.5 °F (-8.6 °C). The average seasonal (Dec-Mar) snowfall total is < 2 inches (< 5 cm), and the average annual peak in nor'easter activity is in February.

Climate data for Pea Island National Wildlife Refuge Visitor Center, NC (1981-2010 Averages)
| Month | Jan | Feb | Mar | Apr | May | Jun | Jul | Aug | Sep | Oct | Nov | Dec | Year |
|---|---|---|---|---|---|---|---|---|---|---|---|---|---|
| Mean daily maximum °F (°C) | 52.3 (11.3) | 54.1 (12.3) | 59.1 (15.1) | 66.3 (19.1) | 73.6 (23.1) | 80.9 (27.2) | 84.5 (29.2) | 83.9 (28.8) | 79.7 (26.5) | 71.8 (22.1) | 64.2 (17.9) | 56.2 (13.4) | 69.0 (20.6) |
| Daily mean °F (°C) | 45.1 (7.3) | 46.8 (8.2) | 51.7 (10.9) | 59.3 (15.2) | 67.1 (19.5) | 75.3 (24.1) | 79.2 (26.2) | 78.6 (25.9) | 74.5 (23.6) | 65.8 (18.8) | 57.5 (14.2) | 49.1 (9.5) | 62.6 (17.0) |
| Mean daily minimum °F (°C) | 37.9 (3.3) | 39.5 (4.2) | 44.3 (6.8) | 52.3 (11.3) | 60.5 (15.8) | 69.7 (20.9) | 74.0 (23.3) | 73.3 (22.9) | 69.4 (20.8) | 59.8 (15.4) | 50.9 (10.5) | 42.1 (5.6) | 56.2 (13.4) |
| Average precipitation inches (mm) | 4.44 (113) | 3.96 (101) | 3.77 (96) | 3.29 (84) | 3.67 (93) | 4.26 (108) | 5.45 (138) | 6.22 (158) | 6.16 (156) | 4.19 (106) | 3.99 (101) | 3.92 (100) | 53.32 (1,354) |
| Average relative humidity (%) | 69.7 | 69.4 | 67.5 | 69.2 | 71.8 | 75.7 | 77.9 | 76.5 | 74.9 | 71.7 | 72.4 | 70.7 | 72.3 |
| Average dew point °F (°C) | 35.8 (2.1) | 37.3 (2.9) | 41.3 (5.2) | 49.2 (9.6) | 57.7 (14.3) | 67.1 (19.5) | 71.7 (22.1) | 70.6 (21.4) | 66.0 (18.9) | 56.4 (13.6) | 48.7 (9.3) | 40.0 (4.4) | 53.6 (12.0) |
Source: PRISM

Climate data for Duck, NC Ocean Water Temperature (35 NW Pea Island National Wildlife Refuge Visitor Center)
| Month | Jan | Feb | Mar | Apr | May | Jun | Jul | Aug | Sep | Oct | Nov | Dec | Year |
|---|---|---|---|---|---|---|---|---|---|---|---|---|---|
| Daily mean °F (°C) | 45 (7) | 44 (7) | 46 (8) | 59 (15) | 67 (19) | 74 (23) | 71 (22) | 74 (23) | 75 (24) | 69 (21) | 59 (15) | 52 (11) | 61 (16) |
Source: NOAA

== Ecology ==
According to the A. W. Kuchler U.S. potential natural vegetation types, Pea Island National Wildlife Refuge, North Carolina would have a dominant vegetation type of live oak/sea oats (Uniola paniculata) (90) with a dominant vegetation form of coastal prairie (20).

== See also ==
- Pea Island Life-Saving Station
- Pea Island
