= Duck, North Carolina =

- Town
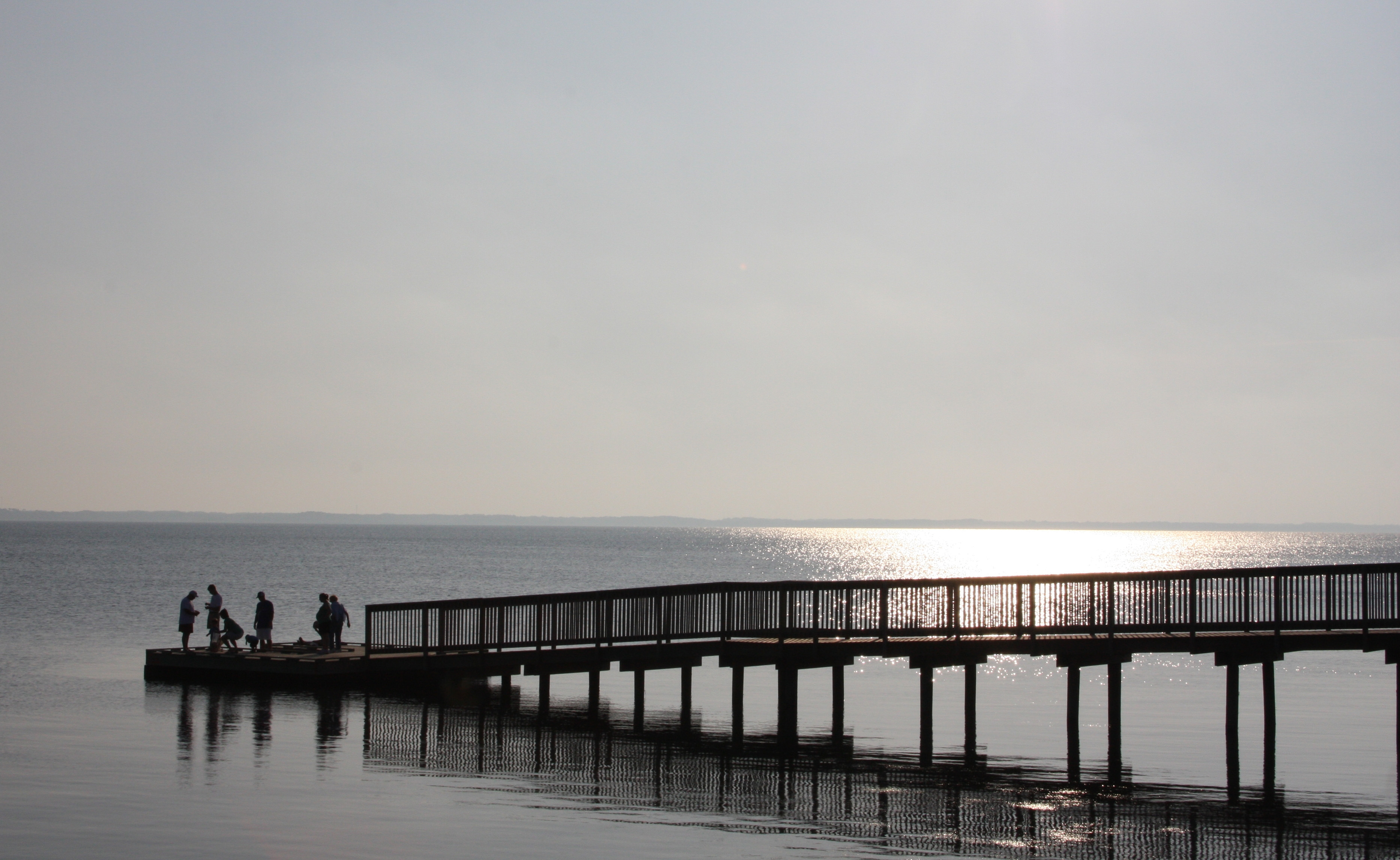
- The boardwalk at Duck Town Park in 2009

- Flag Seal

- Location in Dare County, North Carolina

- Location within North Carolina Location within the United States
- Coordinates: 36°10′11″N 75°45′19″W
- Country: United States
- State: North Carolina
- County: Dare
- Founded: 1984
- Incorporated: 2002
- Named for: Duck

Area
  - Total: 3.72 sq mi (9.64 km^{2})
  - Land: 2.42 sq mi (6.26 km^{2})
  - Water: 1.31 sq mi (3.38 km^{2})
- Elevation: 6.6 ft (2 m)

Population (2020)
  - Total: 742
  - Density: 307.0/sq mi (118.54/km^{2})
- Time zone: UTC−05:00 (Eastern (EST))
  - Summer (DST): UTC−04:00 (EDT)
- ZIP Code: 27949
- Area code: 252
- FIPS code: 37-18060
- GNIS feature ID (populated place): 1025292
- GNIS feature ID (town): 2406400
- Website: ducknc.gov

Duck is a town in Dare County, North Carolina, United States. As of the 2020 census, the population was 742. Duck is the northernmost incorporated town in Dare County and the Outer Banks' newest town, incorporated on May 1, 2002. Duck offers visitors outdoor recreational activities, summer events and concerts, watersports, fine dining, shopping, art galleries, and a nationally known jazz festival, as well as the 11-acre (4.5 ha) Town Park and soundside boardwalk.

== History ==
On March 28, 2001, state representative William T. Culpepper III introduced the Duck Incorporation Bill in the North Carolina House of Representatives. The bill was passed on August 29, 2001. On November 6, 2001, voters voted in favor of incorporation, and Duck was incorporated as the sixth town in Dare County on May 1, 2002.

The Caffeys Inlet Lifesaving Station was listed on the National Register of Historic Places in January 1978.

== Geography ==
Duck is located along the northern Outer Banks, between the Atlantic Ocean to the east and Currituck Sound to the west. According to the United States Census Bureau, the town has a total area of 3.7 square miles (9.6 km^{2}), of which 2.4 square miles (6.3 km^{2}) is land and 1.3 square miles (3.4 km^{2}), or 35.02% is water. Originally part of Currituck County to the north, the stretch of the Outer Banks which includes Duck was transferred to Dare County in the early 20th century. The region was named for the many ducks and waterfowl in the area.

According to the A. W. Kuchler U.S. potential natural vegetation types, Duck, North Carolina would have a dominant vegetation type of Live oak/Sea Oats Uniola paniculata (90) with a dominant vegetation form of Coastal Prairie (20).

=== Climate ===
The town of Duck marks the northernmost extent of hardiness zone 8b along the east coast of the United States.

Climate data for Duck, North Carolina
Month	Jan	Feb	Mar	Apr	May	Jun	Jul	Aug	Sep	Oct	Nov	Dec	Year
Average sea temperature °F (°C)	45 (7)	44 (7)	46 (8)	59 (15)	67 (19)	74 (23)	71 (22)	74 (23)	75 (24)	69 (21)	59 (15)	52 (11)	61 (16)
Source: NOAA

== Demographics ==
Historical population
Census	Pop.	Note	%±
2010	369		—
2020	742		101.1%
2021 (est.)	758	▲	2.2%
U.S. Decennial Census

=== 2020 census ===
Duck racial composition
Race	Number	Percentage
White (non-Hispanic)	704	94.88%
Asian	7	0.94%
Other/Mixed	25	3.37%
Hispanic or Latino	17	2.29%

As of the 2020 United States census, there were 742 people, 288 households, and 202 families residing in the town.

== Tourist attractions ==
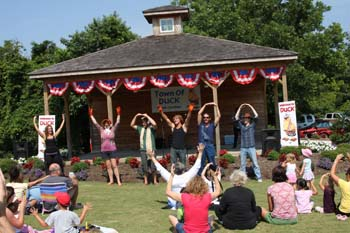
A morning theater and music show at Duck Town Park

The town park is a recreational facility with trails through the maritime forest and willow swamp. It also has an amphitheater, playground, picnic shelter, and public kayak/canoeing launch. The town has built a boardwalk which can be accessed from the park and through the commercial village. The boardwalk extends 0.78 miles (1.26 km) along Currituck Sound. Duck's beach was named one of the "Top 15 Family-Friendly Beaches in America".

In October, Duck hosts its annual Jazz Festival. During the summer months, the town offers over 60 events and programs including Yoga on the Green, Movies on the Sound, a family magic show, live concerts and interactive theater. Programs are free and open to the public.

== Government ==
In addition to traditional town council meetings, there are regularly scheduled meetings where the public can address issues before the council.

Duck is one of only a very few US municipalities that is an anti-bellwether, meaning it has voted for the losing candidate in each of the past 4 presidential elections. (Romney, Clinton, Trump, Harris).

== Education ==
Residents are zoned to Dare County Schools. Zoned schools are Kitty Hawk Elementary School, First Flight Middle School, and First Flight High School. Prior to 2004, First Flight High zoned students were zoned to Manteo High School.

== Notable residents ==
- Harold R. Story, US Army major general

Preceded by Corolla	Beaches of The Outer Banks	Succeeded by Southern Shores
