= Collington =

Collington or Colington may refer to:

== Places ==
- Collington Branch, a stream in Maryland
- Collington railway station on the south coast of England
- Collington Road, Maryland Route 197
- Collington, Herefordshire, a civil parish in England
- Collington, Maryland, a defunct settlement in the United States

== Others ==
- Collington (band), American indie rock band of James Collington
- USS Colington, various ships of the US Navy
- Colington Island, North Carolina, United States
