= Stumpy Point, North Carolina =

Unincorporated community in Dare County, North Carolina, United States

- Unincorporated community
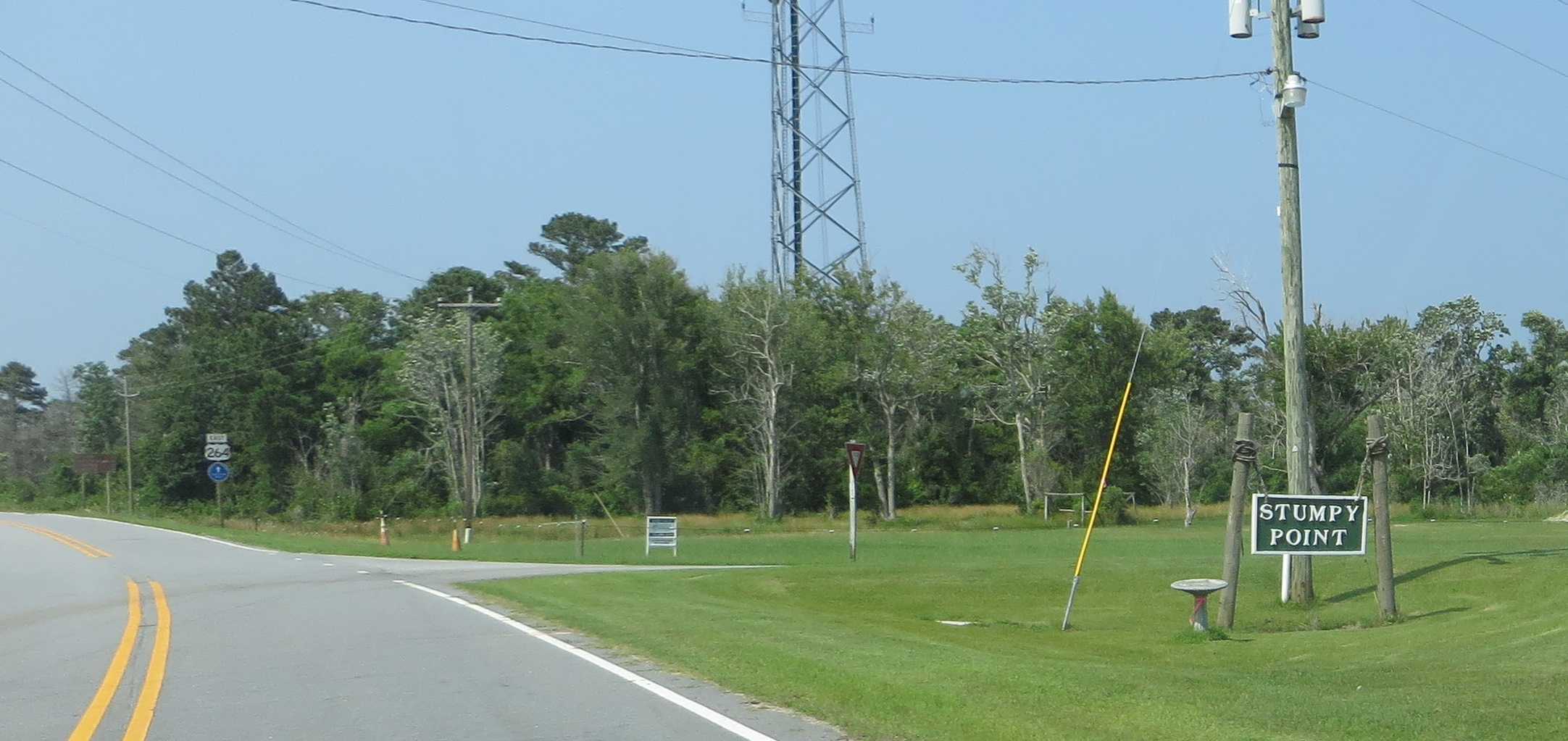
- Stumpy Point on U.S. Route 264, June 2014

- Location within the state of North Carolina
- Coordinates: 35°41′54″N 75°44′27″W
- Country: United States
- State: North Carolina
- County: Dare County
- Elevation: 3.000 ft (0.9144 m)
- Time zone: UTC-5 (Eastern (EST))
  - Summer (DST): UTC-4 (EDT)
- ZIP code: 27978
- Area code: 252

Stumpy Point is an unincorporated community along the north side of Stumpy Point Bay in Dare County, North Carolina, United States.

== Description ==
The community is located at the intersection of U.S. Route 264 and Bayview Drive. It is surrounded by the Alligator River National Wildlife Refuge.

A post office called Stumpy Point that had been in operation since 1876 closed in 2018 due to lack of PO box holders The community takes its name from Stumpy Point Bay.

The North Carolina Ferry System maintains an emergency ferry terminal at Stumpy Point, used when a hurricane or tropical storm closes North Carolina Highway 12 on the Outer Banks.

The town is mentioned in the sci-fi novel Ender's Game by Orson Scott Card, in which the little town is razed sometime in the future to build a spaceport in Pamlico Sound, and the spaceport is unofficially named after Stumpy Point.

== Education ==
Residents are zoned to Dare County Schools. Zoned schools include Manteo Elementary School, Manteo Middle School, and Manteo High School.
