= Southern Shores, North Carolina =

- Town
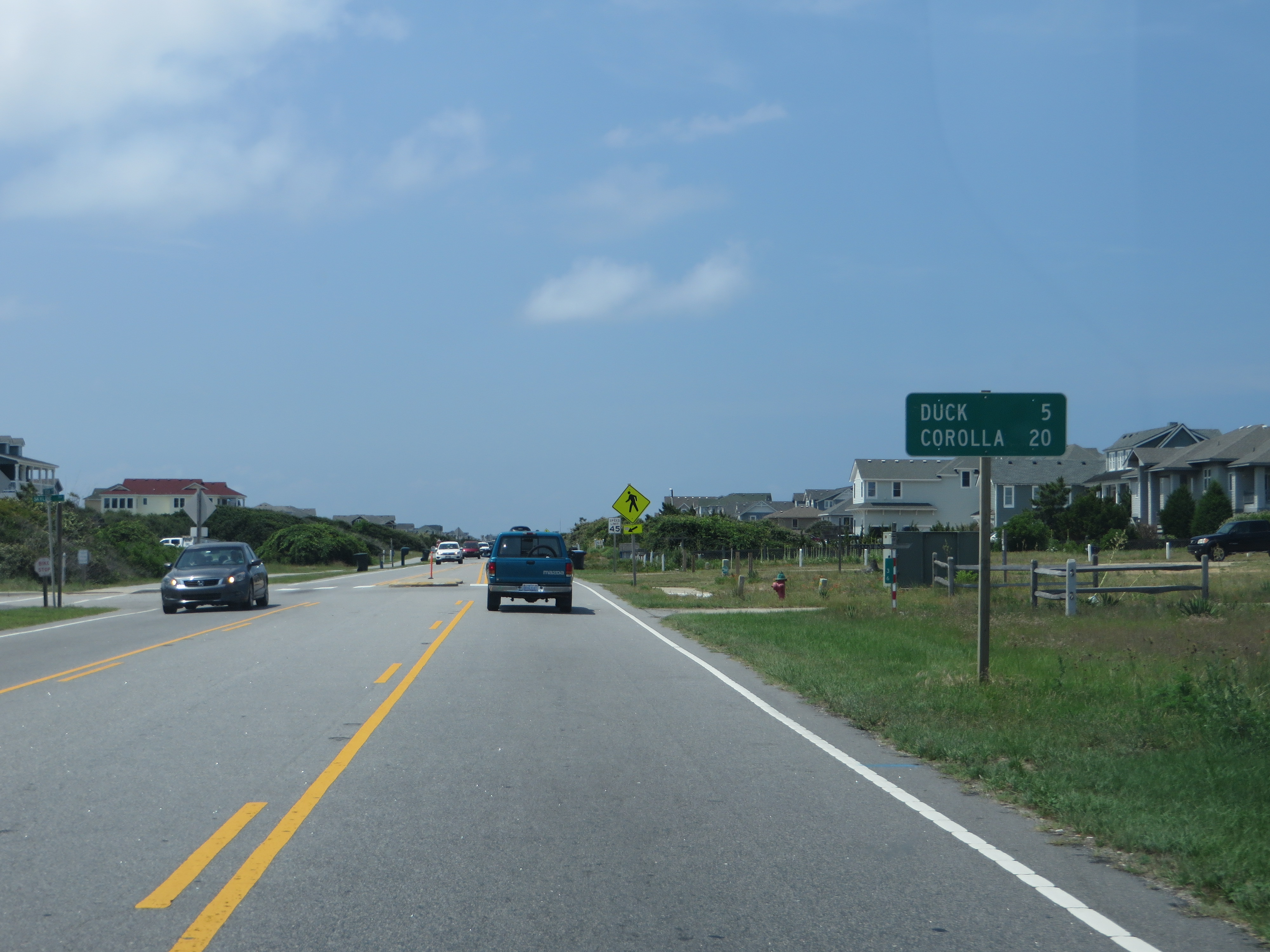

- Flag Seal

- Location in Dare County and the state of North Carolina
- Coordinates: 36°7′28″N 75°43′57″W
- Country: United States
- State: North Carolina
- County: Dare
- Incorporated: 1969

Area
  - Total: 4.15 sq mi (10.75 km^{2})
  - Land: 3.95 sq mi (10.22 km^{2})
  - Water: 0.20 sq mi (0.53 km^{2})
- Elevation: 20 ft (6.1 m)

Population (2020)
  - Total: 3,090
  - Density: 783.0/sq mi (302.33/km^{2})
- Time zone: UTC-5 (Eastern (EST))
  - Summer (DST): UTC-4 (EDT)
- ZIP code: 27949
- Area code: 252
- FIPS code: 37-63130
- GNIS feature ID: 1001094
- Website: southernshores-nc.gov

Southern Shores is a town in Dare County, North Carolina, United States. It is located on the Outer Banks and the population was 3,107 at the 2020 census.

== Geography ==
Southern Shores is located at 36°7′28″N 75°43′57″W (36.124454, -75.732612).

According to the United States Census Bureau, the town has a total area of 4.2 square miles (10.8 km^{2}), of which 3.9 square miles (10.2 km^{2}) is land and 0.19 square miles (0.5 km^{2}), or 4.92%, is water.

== Demographics ==
Historical population
Census	Pop.	Note	%±
1980	395		—
1990	617		56.2%
2000	2,201		256.7%
2010	2,714		23.3%
2020	3,090		13.9%
2021 (est.)	3,175	▲	2.8%
U.S. Decennial Census

=== 2020 census ===
As of the 2020 census, Southern Shores had a population of 3,090. The median age was 58.8 years. 15.0% of residents were under the age of 18 and 36.7% of residents were 65 years of age or older. For every 100 females there were 99.2 males, and for every 100 females age 18 and over there were 93.9 males age 18 and over.

100.0% of residents lived in urban areas, while 0.0% lived in rural areas.

There were 1,355 households in Southern Shores, of which 19.3% had children under the age of 18 living in them. Of all households, 65.4% were married-couple households, 10.6% were households with a male householder and no spouse or partner present, and 19.3% were households with a female householder and no spouse or partner present. About 22.1% of all households were made up of individuals and 15.3% had someone living alone who was 65 years of age or older.

There were 2,506 housing units, of which 45.9% were vacant. The homeowner vacancy rate was 0.6% and the rental vacancy rate was 23.3%.

Southern Shores racial composition
Race	Number	Percentage
White (non-Hispanic)	2,870	92.88%
Black or African American (non-Hispanic)	15	0.49%
Native American	7	0.23%
Asian	22	0.71%
Pacific Islander	1	0.03%
Other/Mixed	112	3.62%
Hispanic or Latino	63	2.04%

=== 2000 census ===
As of the census of 2000, there were 2,201 people, 946 households, and 725 families residing in the town. The population density was 540.4 inhabitants per square mile (208.6/km^{2}). There were 1,921 housing units at an average density of 471.7 per square mile (182.1/km^{2}). The racial makeup of the town was 98.23% White, 0.09% African American, 0.23% Native American, 0.23% Asian, 0.09% Pacific Islander, 0.64% from other races, and 0.50% from two or more races. Hispanic or Latino of any race were 1.54% of the population.

There were 946 households, out of which 21.8% had children under the age of 18 living with them, 71.6% were married couples living together, 3.7% had a female householder with no husband present, and 23.3% were non-families. 20.2% of all households were made up of individuals, and 9.5% had someone living alone who was 65 years of age or older. The average household size was 2.33 and the average family size was 2.64.

In the town, the population was spread out, with 18.6% under the age of 18, 2.7% from 18 to 24, 17.4% from 25 to 44, 36.5% from 45 to 64, and 24.9% who were 65 years of age or older. The median age was 51 years. For every 100 females, there were 97.4 males. For every 100 females age 18 and over, there were 93.2 males.

The median income for a household in the town was $61,676, and the median income for a family was $68,250. Males had a median income of $41,563 versus $31,875 for females. The per capita income for the town was $35,933. About 1.6% of families and 3.1% of the population were below the poverty line, including 4.6% of those under age 18 and 0.8% of those age 65 or over.

== Climate ==
According to the Trewartha climate classification system, Southern Shores, North Carolina has a humid subtropical climate with hot and humid summers, cool winters and year-around precipitation (Cfak). Cfak climates are characterized by all months having an average mean temperature > 32.0 °F (> 0.0 °C), at least eight months with an average mean temperature ≥ 50.0 °F (≥ 10.0 °C), at least one month with an average mean temperature ≥ 71.6 °F (≥ 22.0 °C) and no significant precipitation difference between seasons. During the summer months in Southern Shores, a cooling afternoon sea breeze is present on most days, but episodes of extreme heat and humidity can occur with heat index values ≥ 100 °F (≥ 38 °C). Southern Shores is prone to hurricane strikes, particularly during the Atlantic hurricane season which extends from June 1 through November 30, sharply peaking from late August through September. During the winter months, episodes of cold and wind can occur with wind chill values < 10 °F (< -12 °C). The plant hardiness zone in Southern Shores is 8b with an average annual extreme minimum air temperature of 16.3 °F (-8.7 °C). The average seasonal (Dec-Mar) snowfall total is < 2 inches (< 5 cm), and the average annual peak in nor'easter activity is in February.

Climate data for Southern Shores, NC (1981-2010 Averages)
Month	Jan	Feb	Mar	Apr	May	Jun	Jul	Aug	Sep	Oct	Nov	Dec	Year
Mean daily maximum °F (°C)	49.1 (9.5)	51.1 (10.6)	56.5 (13.6)	64.6 (18.1)	72.1 (22.3)	79.4 (26.3)	83.4 (28.6)	81.8 (27.7)	77.2 (25.1)	69.4 (20.8)	61.3 (16.3)	53.0 (11.7)	66.6 (19.2)
Daily mean °F (°C)	43.0 (6.1)	44.8 (7.1)	49.7 (9.8)	58.0 (14.4)	66.0 (18.9)	74.4 (23.6)	78.7 (25.9)	77.9 (25.5)	73.3 (22.9)	64.5 (18.1)	55.8 (13.2)	46.9 (8.3)	61.2 (16.2)
Mean daily minimum °F (°C)	37.0 (2.8)	38.4 (3.6)	43.0 (6.1)	51.3 (10.7)	59.9 (15.5)	69.4 (20.8)	74.1 (23.4)	73.9 (23.3)	69.4 (20.8)	59.6 (15.3)	50.2 (10.1)	40.9 (4.9)	55.7 (13.2)
Average precipitation inches (mm)	4.16 (106)	3.47 (88)	3.86 (98)	3.38 (86)	3.71 (94)	4.27 (108)	4.98 (126)	5.88 (149)	5.21 (132)	3.79 (96)	3.64 (92)	3.67 (93)	50.02 (1,271)
Average relative humidity (%)	70.0	69.4	67.6	68.0	70.7	75.1	76.8	75.4	73.7	71.8	72.5	71.9	71.9
Average dew point °F (°C)	33.9 (1.1)	35.4 (1.9)	39.4 (4.1)	47.5 (8.6)	56.2 (13.4)	66.0 (18.9)	70.8 (21.6)	69.5 (20.8)	64.4 (18.0)	55.2 (12.9)	47.1 (8.4)	38.3 (3.5)	52.1 (11.2)
Source: PRISM

Climate data for Duck, NC Ocean Water Temperature (4 N Southern Shores)
Month	Jan	Feb	Mar	Apr	May	Jun	Jul	Aug	Sep	Oct	Nov	Dec	Year
Daily mean °F (°C)	45 (7)	44 (7)	46 (8)	59 (15)	67 (19)	74 (23)	71 (22)	74 (23)	75 (24)	69 (21)	59 (15)	52 (11)	61 (16)
Source: NOAA

== Ecology ==
According to the A. W. Kuchler U.S. potential natural vegetation types, Southern Shores, North Carolina would have a dominant vegetation type of Live oak/Sea Oats Uniola paniculata (90) with a dominant vegetation form of Coastal Prairie (20).

== Education ==
Residents are zoned to Dare County Schools. Zoned schools are Kitty Hawk Elementary School, First Flight Middle School, and First Flight High School. Prior to 2004, First Flight High zoned students were zoned to Manteo High School.

Preceded by Duck	Beaches of The Outer Banks	Succeeded by Kitty Hawk
