= First Flight Baseball Complex =

Baseball field in North Carolina, US

Coordinates: 36.004713°N 75.669751°W

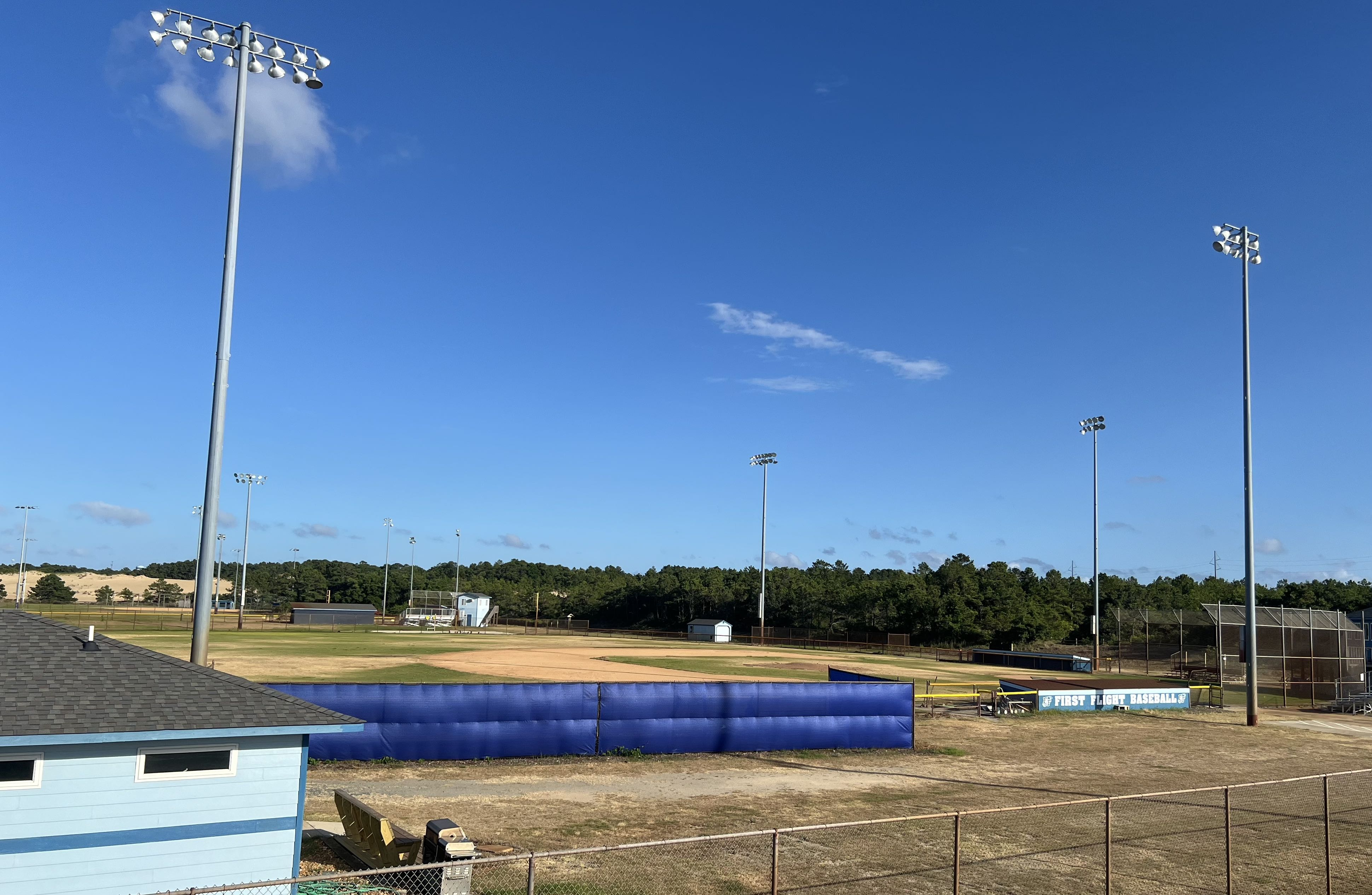
First Flight Baseball Complex

The TowneBank OBX Park at First Flight Athletic Complex is a baseball venue in Kill Devil Hills, North Carolina, at First Flight High School. It is the home playing-field to the Outer Banks Daredevils of the Tidewater Summer League, a collegiate summer baseball league. The team, which was founded for the 1997 season, began playing at the field in the 2006 season. Prior, the Daredevils had played at Coy Tillett Memorial Field in Manteo, North Carolina.

In 2018, the Daredevils temporarily relocated to Virginia Beach while the complex underwent renovation. Their temporary home venue was Lakewood Park in Norfolk, Virginia. The venue re-opened in 2020. The field street address is 111 Veterans Drive, Kill Devils Hills, North Carolina.

The field's dimensions are 355 ft. down the foul lines, 368 ft. to the gaps, and 385 ft. to center field.
