= Kitty Hawk, North Carolina =

Kitty Hawk
- Town
- Flag Seal
- Motto: "First in Flight"
- Location in Dare County, North Carolina

- Location within North Carolina Location within the United States
- Coordinates: 36°4′37″N 75°42′17″W
- Country: United States
- State: North Carolina
- County: Dare
- Incorporated: 1981
- Named for: Chickehauk

Area
  - Total: 8.29 sq mi (21.46 km^{2})
  - Land: 8.12 sq mi (21.03 km^{2})
  - Water: 0.17 sq mi (0.43 km^{2})
- Elevation: 6.6 ft (2 m)

Population (2020)
  - Total: 3,689
  - Density: 454.4/sq mi (175.44/km^{2})
- Time zone: UTC-5 (Eastern (EST))
  - Summer (DST): UTC-4 (EDT)
- ZIP code: 27949
- Area code: 252
- FIPS code: 37-36060
- GNIS feature ID: 1021059
- Website: www.kittyhawknc.gov

Kitty Hawk is a town in Dare County, North Carolina, United States, located on Bodie Island within the state's Outer Banks. The population was 3,708 at the 2020 United States census. It was established in the early 18th century as Chickahawk.

== History ==
There are a number of folk legends regarding the origin of the name Kitty Hawk, which has also been spelled Chickahawk, Ketterhock, etc. Roger Payne concludes that it was an Algonquin word chicahauk meaning "a place to hunt geese". The spelling "Kitty Hawk" was adopted by the United States Board on Geographic Names in 1959.

Kitty Hawk became world-famous after the Wright brothers made the first controlled powered airplane flights at Kill Devil Hills, four miles (6.4 km) south of the town, on December 17, 1903. After the four flights in their Wright Flyer, the brothers walked back to Kitty Hawk. Here, they sent a telegram from the Weather Bureau office to their father informing him of their success. Kitty Hawk is usually credited as the site of the powered flights because it was the nearest named settlement at the time of the flight; the modern town of Kill Devil Hills did not exist until 50 years after the flights. The Wrights chose the area because its frequent winds and soft sandy surfaces were suitable for their glider experiments, which they conducted over three years before they made the powered flights.

The Old Currituck Sound Bridge was completed in 1930, which connected the mainland to the Outer Banks across Albemarle Sound, prompting the paving of a road between the two existing bridges (the other in Manteo) and connecting the Outer Banks to the outside world by road for the first time.

The aircraft carrier USS Kitty Hawk (CV-63), the B-2 Spirit stealth bomber AV-19 with an aircraft number of 93–1086, P-40D Kittyhawk fighter aircraft, the aircraft transport ship USS Kitty Hawk (AKV-1), and the Apollo 14 command module have been named for the town, which incorporated in 1981.

The Kitty Hawk Life-Saving Station was listed on the National Register of Historic Places in 1984.

== Geography ==
Kitty Hawk is located at 36.1°N 75.7°W at an elevation of 7 feet (2 m) above sea level. According to the United States Census Bureau, the town has a complete area of 8.23 square miles (21.3 km^{2}), of which 8.18 square miles (21.2 km^{2}) is land and 0.0476 square miles (0.123 km^{2}) (0.579%) is water.

According to the A. W. Kuchler U.S. potential natural vegetation types, Kitty Hawk, North Carolina would have a dominant vegetation type of Live oak/Sea Oats Uniola paniculata (90) with a dominant vegetation form of Coastal Prairie (20).

Kitty Hawk is served by US 158 and Highway 12, which parallel each other in the city. US 158 can be used to go west, while the barrier islands extend north and south.

=== Climate ===
According to the Trewartha climate classification system, Kitty Hawk, North Carolina has a humid subtropical climate with hot and humid summers, cool winters and year-around precipitation (Cfak). Cfak climates are characterized by all months having an average mean temperature > 32.0 °F (> 0.0 °C), at least eight months with an average mean temperature ≥ 50.0 °F (≥ 10.0 °C), at least one month with an average mean temperature ≥ 71.6 °F (≥ 22.0 °C) and no significant precipitation difference between seasons. During the summer months in Kitty Hawk, a cooling afternoon sea breeze is present on most days, but episodes of extreme heat and humidity can occur with heat index values ≥ 100 °F (≥ 38 °C). Kitty Hawk is prone to hurricane strikes, particularly during the Atlantic hurricane season which extends from June 1 through November 30, sharply peaking from late August through September. During the winter months, episodes of cold and wind can occur with wind chill values < 10 °F (< -12 °C). The plant hardiness zone in Kitty Hawk is 8b with an average annual extreme minimum air temperature of 16.6 °F (−8.6 °C). The average seasonal (Dec–Mar) snowfall total is < 2 inches (< 5 cm), and the average annual peak in nor'easter activity is in February.

Climate data for Kitty Hawk, NC (1981-2010 Averages)
Month	Jan	Feb	Mar	Apr	May	Jun	Jul	Aug	Sep	Oct	Nov	Dec	Year
Mean daily maximum °F (°C)	50.2 (10.1)	51.9 (11.1)	57.3 (14.1)	65.5 (18.6)	73.0 (22.8)	80.4 (26.9)	84.3 (29.1)	83.0 (28.3)	78.3 (25.7)	70.3 (21.3)	62.3 (16.8)	54.0 (12.2)	67.6 (19.8)
Daily mean °F (°C)	43.8 (6.6)	45.4 (7.4)	50.3 (10.2)	58.5 (14.7)	66.5 (19.2)	74.9 (23.8)	79.2 (26.2)	78.4 (25.8)	73.8 (23.2)	64.9 (18.3)	56.3 (13.5)	47.6 (8.7)	61.7 (16.5)
Mean daily minimum °F (°C)	37.4 (3.0)	38.8 (3.8)	43.4 (6.3)	51.5 (10.8)	60.1 (15.6)	69.4 (20.8)	74.1 (23.4)	73.8 (23.2)	69.2 (20.7)	59.5 (15.3)	50.3 (10.2)	41.2 (5.1)	55.8 (13.2)
Average precipitation inches (mm)	4.23 (107)	3.50 (89)	3.86 (98)	3.41 (87)	3.73 (95)	4.29 (109)	4.97 (126)	5.94 (151)	5.26 (134)	3.79 (96)	3.68 (93)	3.71 (94)	50.37 (1,279)
Average relative humidity (%)	69.9	69.5	67.4	67.6	70.2	73.9	75.3	74.7	73.5	71.1	72.0	71.7	71.4
Average dew point °F (°C)	34.6 (1.4)	36.0 (2.2)	39.9 (4.4)	47.8 (8.8)	56.5 (13.6)	66.0 (18.9)	70.7 (21.5)	69.7 (20.9)	64.8 (18.2)	55.3 (12.9)	47.4 (8.6)	38.9 (3.8)	52.4 (11.3)
Source: PRISM

Climate data for Duck, NC Ocean Water Temperature (8 N Kitty Hawk)
Month	Jan	Feb	Mar	Apr	May	Jun	Jul	Aug	Sep	Oct	Nov	Dec	Year
Daily mean °F (°C)	45 (7)	44 (7)	46 (8)	59 (15)	67 (19)	74 (23)	71 (22)	74 (23)	75 (24)	69 (21)	59 (15)	52 (11)	61 (16)
Source: NOAA

== Demographics ==
Historical population
Census	Pop.	Note	%±
1990	1,937		—
2000	2,991		54.4%
2010	3,272		9.4%
2020	3,689		12.7%
2021 (est.)	3,761	▲	2.0%

=== 2020 census ===
As of the 2020 census, there were 3,689 people and 1,073 families in Kitty Hawk. The median age was 48.3 years. 19.2% of residents were under the age of 18 and 23.3% were 65 years of age or older. For every 100 females there were 94.7 males, and for every 100 females age 18 and over there were 90.2 males age 18 and over.

83.3% of residents lived in urban areas, while 16.7% lived in rural areas.

There were 1,574 households in Kitty Hawk, of which 25.3% had children under the age of 18 living in them. Of all households, 54.1% were married-couple households, 14.4% were households with a male householder and no spouse or partner present, and 24.1% were households with a female householder and no spouse or partner present. About 25.5% of all households were made up of individuals and 12.0% had someone living alone who was 65 years of age or older.

There were 3,207 housing units, of which 50.9% were vacant. The homeowner vacancy rate was 0.6% and the rental vacancy rate was 23.9%.

Kitty Hawk racial composition
Race	Number	Percentage
White (non-Hispanic)	3,324	90.11%
Black or African American (non-Hispanic)	18	0.49%
Native American	4	0.11%
Asian	25	0.68%
Pacific Islander	3	0.08%
Other/Mixed	134	3.63%
Hispanic or Latino	181	4.91%

=== 2000 census ===
As of the census of 2000, there were 2,991 people, 1,265 households, and 866 families residing in the town. The population density was 365.8 people per square mile (141.2 people/km^{2}). There were 2,618 housing units at an average density of 320.1 per square mile (123.6/km^{2}). The racial makeup of the town was 98.13% White, 0.64% African American, 0.23% Native American, 0.27% Asian, 0.03% Pacific Islander, 0.20% from other races, and 0.50% from two or more races. 0.94% of the population were Hispanic or Latino of any race.

There were 1,265 households, out of which 27.9% had children under the age of 18 years living with them, 58.7% were married couples living together, 7.3% had a female householder with no husband present, and 31.5% were non-families. 23.8% of all tribes were made up of individuals, and 8.0% had someone living alone who was 65 years of age or older. The average household size was 2.35 and the average family size was 2.79.

In the town, the population was spread out, with 21.5% under the age of 18, 5.7% from 18 to 24, 31.6% from 25 to 44, 28.3% from 45 to 64, and 13.0% who were 65 years of age or older. The median age was 41 years. For every 100 girls, there were 103.7 boys. For every 100 girls age 18 and over, there were 97.6 boys.

The median income for a household in the town was $42,813, and the median income for a family was $48,676. Males had a median income of $31,250 versus $25,744 for females. The per capita income for the town was $22,960. About 4.3% of families and 6.5% of the population were below the poverty line, including 7.9% of people under age 18 and 4.6% of people age 65 or over.

== Government ==
Federally, Kitty Hawk is part of North Carolina's 3rd congressional district, represented by Republican Greg Murphy since 2019.

== Education ==
Dare County Schools operates public schools serving the area. Kitty Hawk Elementary School is in the city.

The zoned secondary schools are First Flight Middle School and First Flight High School. Prior to 2004 First Flight High zoned students were zoned to Manteo High School.

== Sister city ==
- Coulaines in Pays de la Loire, France, which is about 1.7 miles (2.7 km) north of Le Mans (signed in 2005)

Preceded by Southern Shores	Beaches of the Outer Banks	Succeeded by Kill Devil Hills
