= Caffeys Inlet Lifesaving Station =

- U.S. National Register of Historic Places
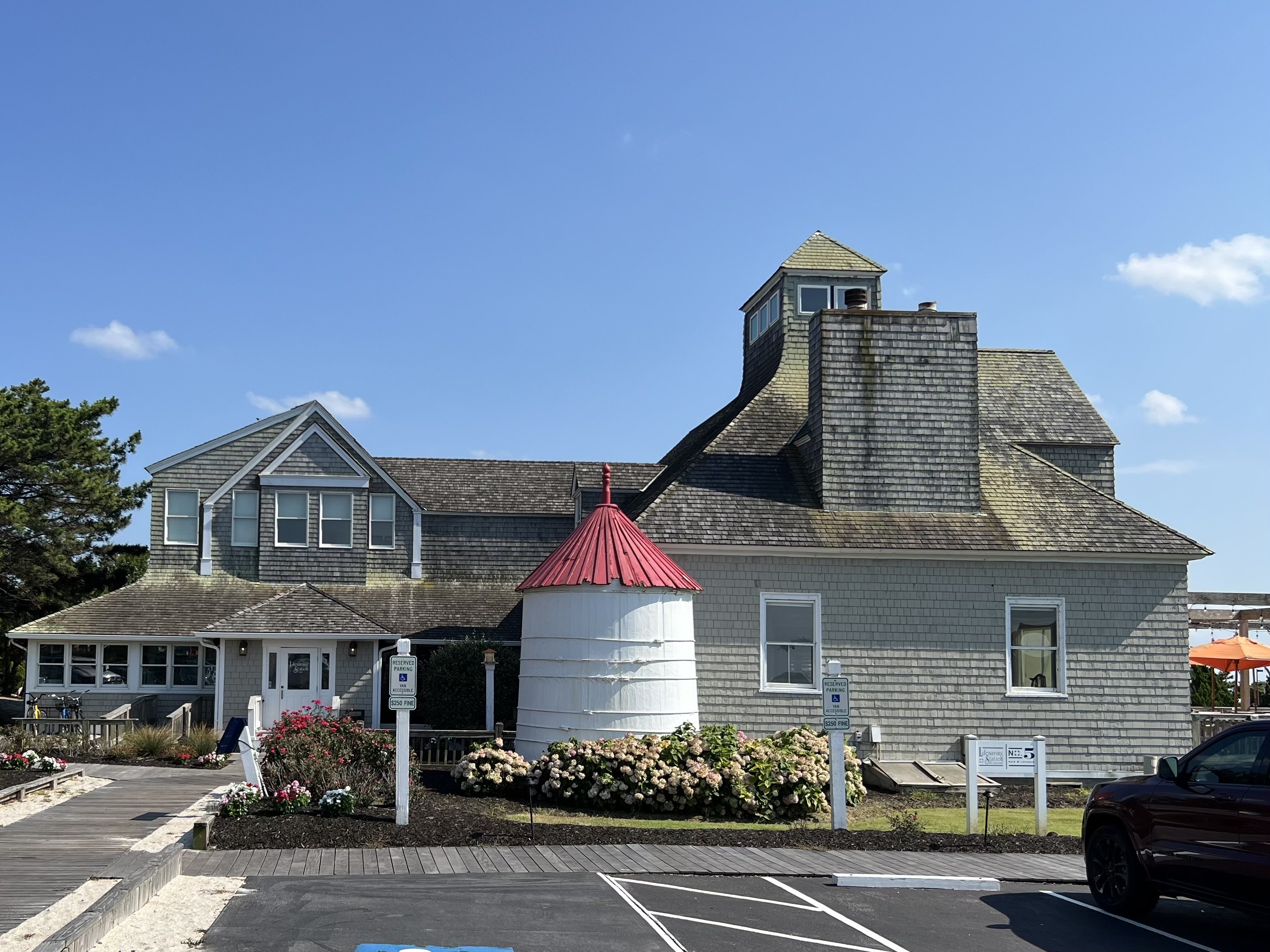
- The former Caffeys Inlet Lifesaving Station

- Location within North Carolina Location within the United States
- Location: N of Duck on SR 1200, near Duck, North Carolina
- Coordinates: 36°13′21.47″N 75°46′14.34″W
- Area: 5 acres (2.0 ha)
- Built: 1897-1898
- Built by: US Life Saving Service
- Architectural style: Shingle Style
- NRHP reference No.: 78001942
- Added to NRHP: January 30, 1978

Caffeys Inlet Lifesaving Station is a historic lifesaving station located near Duck, Dare County, North Carolina. It was built in 1897–1898 by the United States Life-Saving Service near the location of Caffey's Inlet, a historic inlet that opened in 1770 and closed in 1811. It is a two-story, shingle style rectangular frame building with a hipped roof lookout tower. It has hip roofed porches connected by a shed roof porch. It was one of seven lifesaving stations established on the Outer Banks of North Carolina in 1874, to serve the ships that were lost in the treacherous waters off the North Carolina coast.

It was listed on the National Register of Historic Places in 1978.
