= Kill Devil Hills, North Carolina =

- Town
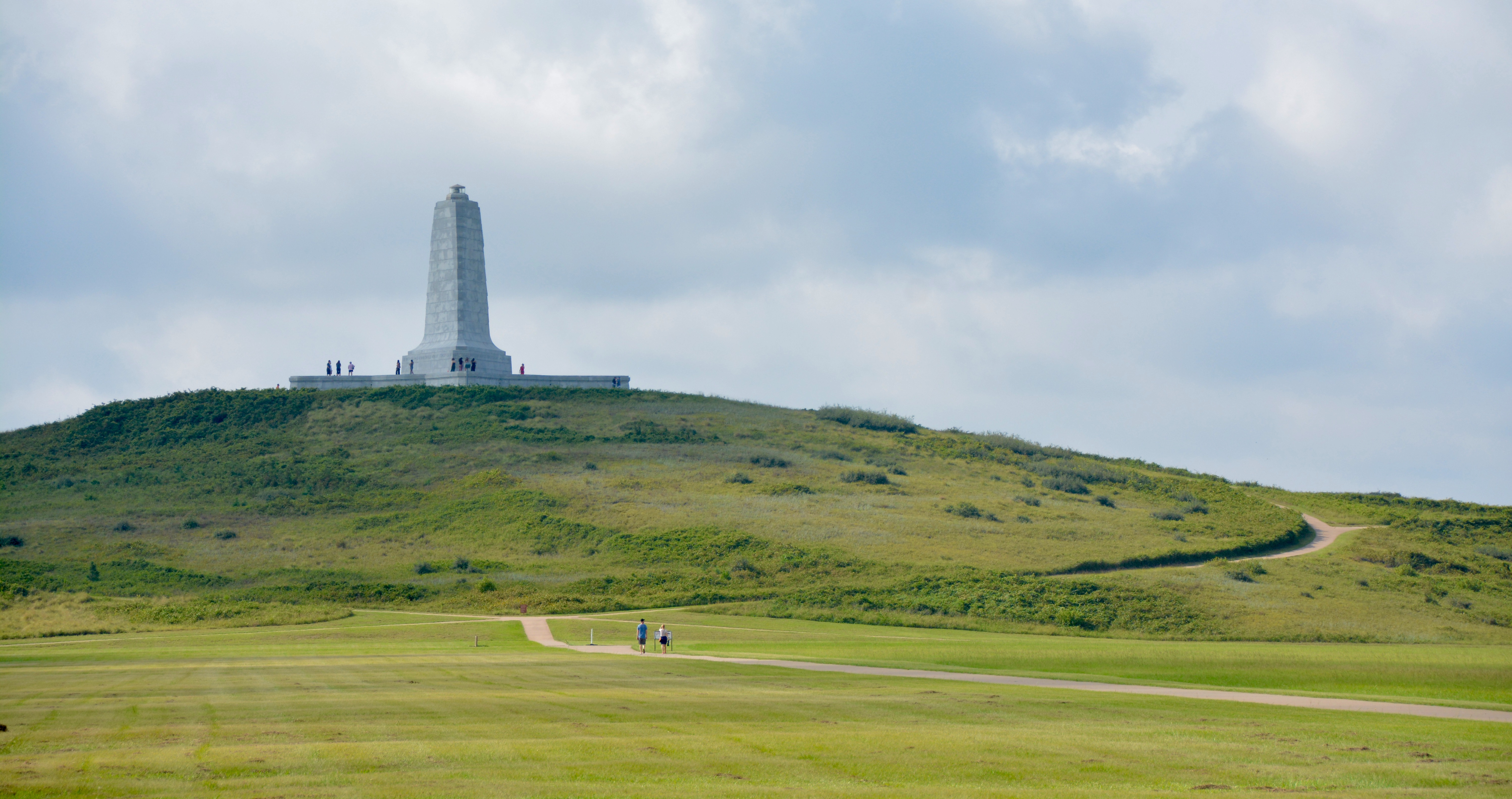
- Kill Devil Hill, Wright Brothers National Memorial

- Flag Seal
- Nickname: Birthplace of Aviation
- Location in Dare County, North Carolina

- Location within North Carolina Location within the United States
- Coordinates: 36°1′32″N 75°40′12″W
- Country: United States
- State: North Carolina
- County: Dare
- Incorporated: 1953
- Named for: Unwholesome rum

Area
  - Total: 5.66 sq mi (14.67 km^{2})
  - Land: 5.61 sq mi (14.53 km^{2})
  - Water: 0.054 sq mi (0.14 km^{2})
- Elevation: 6.6 ft (2 m)

Population (2020)
  - Total: 7,656
  - Density: 1,365.1/sq mi (527.08/km^{2})
- Time zone: UTC-5 (Eastern (EST))
  - Summer (DST): UTC-4 (EDT)
- ZIP code: 27948
- Area code: 252
- FIPS code: 37-35720
- GNIS feature ID: 1025849
- Website: www.kdhnc.com

Kill Devil Hills is a town in Dare County, North Carolina, United States. The population was 7,633 at the 2020 census. It is the most populous settlement in both Dare County and on the Outer Banks of North Carolina. The Kill Devil Hills micropolitan statistical area, consisting of all of Dare County, is part of the larger Virginia Beach–Norfolk combined statistical area.

The town was founded and developed on the site of the Wright brothers' first controlled, powered airplane flights on December 17, 1903, chosen for its good winds. It was commemorated by the Wright Brothers National Memorial, which was dedicated in 1932. At the time of the Wright Flyer flights, the town of Kill Devil Hills did not exist, and it did not receive its municipal charter until 1953. Kitty Hawk, approximately 4 miles (6.4 km) north, was the nearest settlement at the time and is popularly noted as the site of the first flight.

== History ==
Kill Devil Hills is the site of the Wright Brothers National Memorial, commemorating the siblings' four powered airplane flights in the Wright Flyer on Thursday, December 17, 1903. Orville returned in 1911, and on October 25 he set a new world glider record, remaining in the air 10 minutes and 34 seconds, soaring against the wind with very little forward movement.

In addition to the Wright Brothers National Memorial, Sam's Diner in the town is on the National Register of Historic Places, listed in 1999.

== Geography ==
Kill Devil Hills is located at 36°1′32″N 75°40′12″W (36.025448, −75.670105), on the barrier islands known as the Outer Banks.

According to the United States Census Bureau, the town has a total area of 5.5 square miles (14 km^{2}), of which 5.5 square miles (14 km^{2}) is land and 0.04 square miles (0.10 km^{2}) (0.36%) is water.

As a result of its climate and proximity to beaches, the population rises significantly in Kill Devil Hills and other towns located on the Outer Banks during the summer months.

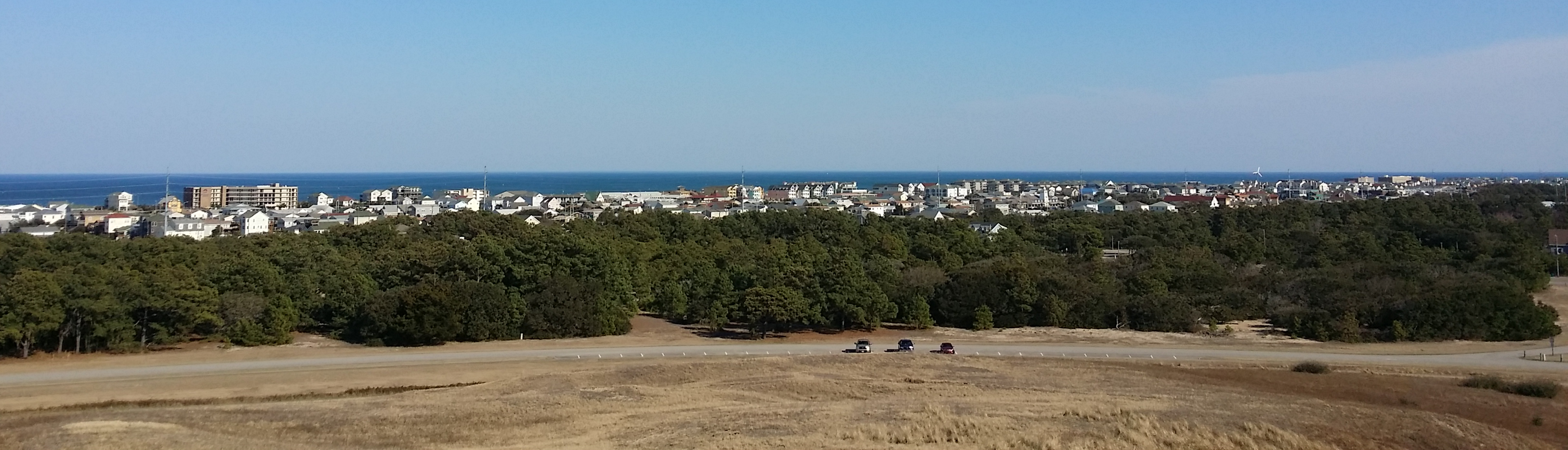
Photographed from the Wright Brothers National Memorial

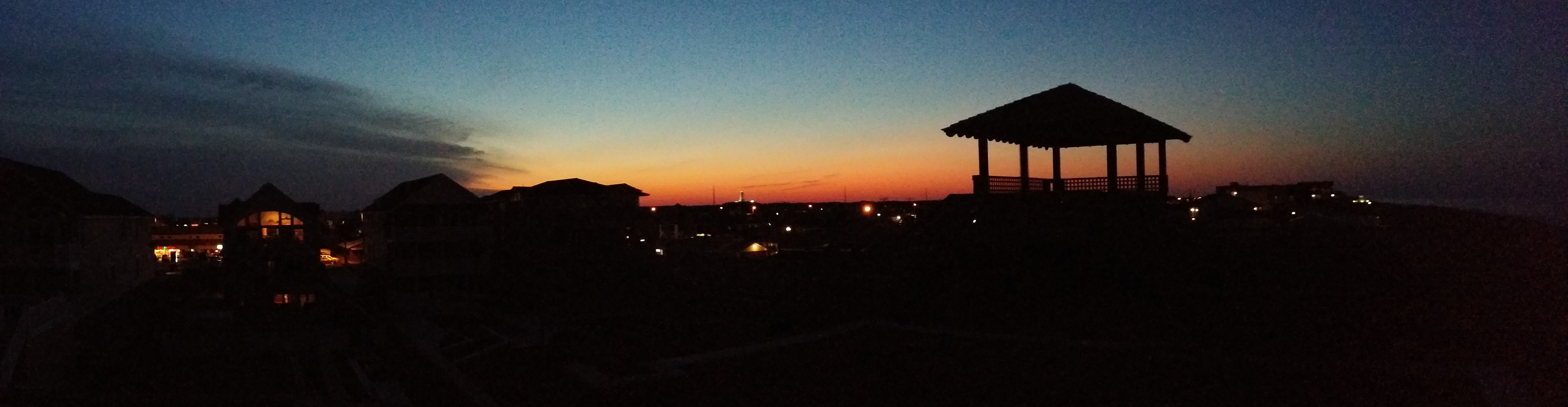
Panorama of Kill Devil Hills at Night

=== Climate ===
According to the Trewartha climate classification system, Kill Devil Hills, North Carolina has a humid subtropical climate with hot and humid summers, cool winters and year-round precipitation (Cfak). Cfak climates are characterized by all months having an average mean temperature > 32.0 °F (> 0.0 °C), at least eight months with an average mean temperature ≥ 50.0 °F (≥ 10.0 °C), at least one month with an average mean temperature ≥ 71.6 °F (≥ 22.0 °C) and no significant precipitation difference between seasons. During the summer months in Kill Devil Hills, a cooling afternoon sea breeze is present on most days, but episodes of extreme heat and humidity can occur with heat index values ≥ 100 °F (≥ 38 °C). Kill Devil Hills is prone to hurricane strikes, particularly during the Atlantic hurricane season which extends from June 1 through November 30, sharply peaking from late August through September. During the winter months, episodes of cold and wind can occur with wind chill values < 10 °F (< -12 °C). The plant hardiness zone in Kill Devil Hills is 9a with an average annual extreme minimum air temperature of 20.0 °F (-8.3 °C). The average seasonal (Dec-Mar) snowfall total is < 2 inches (< 5 cm), and the average annual peak in nor'easter activity is in February.

Climate data for Kill Devil Hills, NC (1991-2020 Averages)
Month	Jan	Feb	Mar	Apr	May	Jun	Jul	Aug	Sep	Oct	Nov	Dec	Year
Mean daily maximum °F (°C)	51.4 (10.8)	52.8 (11.6)	57.8 (14.3)	66.1 (18.9)	73.5 (23.1)	81.1 (27.3)	85.0 (29.4)	83.9 (28.8)	79.3 (26.3)	71.4 (21.9)	62.0 (16.7)	55.3 (12.9)	68.3 (20.2)
Daily mean °F (°C)	44.7 (7.1)	45.9 (7.7)	50.9 (10.5)	59.4 (15.2)	67.5 (19.7)	75.7 (24.3)	79.8 (26.6)	78.9 (26.1)	74.7 (23.7)	65.9 (18.8)	56.0 (13.3)	48.9 (9.4)	62.3 (16.8)
Mean daily minimum °F (°C)	38.0 (3.3)	39.0 (3.9)	44.1 (6.7)	52.8 (11.6)	61.4 (16.3)	70.3 (21.3)	74.6 (23.7)	73.9 (23.3)	70.1 (21.2)	60.5 (15.8)	50.0 (10.0)	42.6 (5.9)	56.4 (13.6)
Average precipitation inches (mm)	3.94 (100)	3.31 (84)	3.71 (94)	3.36 (85)	3.77 (96)	4.57 (116)	6.11 (155)	5.82 (148)	5.55 (141)	4.26 (108)	3.76 (96)	4.09 (104)	52.26 (1,327)
Average relative humidity (%)	70.2	69.5	66.9	66.6	69.3	72.4	73.8	73.0	73.0	70.1	71.8	72.0	70.7
Average dew point °F (°C)	35.8 (2.1)	36.4 (2.4)	40.9 (4.9)	49.2 (9.6)	58.1 (14.5)	66.6 (19.2)	71.4 (21.9)	70.6 (21.4)	66.2 (19.0)	56.8 (13.8)	47.0 (8.3)	40.7 (4.8)	53.3 (11.8)
Source: PRISM

Climate data for Duck, NC Ocean Water Temperature (12 NW Kill Devil Hills)
Month	Jan	Feb	Mar	Apr	May	Jun	Jul	Aug	Sep	Oct	Nov	Dec	Year
Daily mean °F (°C)	45 (7)	44 (7)	46 (8)	59 (15)	67 (19)	74 (23)	71 (22)	74 (23)	75 (24)	69 (21)	59 (15)	52 (11)	61 (16)
Source: NOAA

=== Ecology ===
According to the A. W. Kuchler U.S. potential natural vegetation types, Kill Devil Hills, North Carolina would have a dominant vegetation type of Live oak/Sea Oats Uniola paniculata (90) with a dominant vegetation form of Coastal Prairie (20).

== Demographics ==
Historical population
Census	Pop.	Note	%±
1960	268		—
1970	357		33.2%
1980	1,796		403.1%
1990	4,238		136.0%
2000	5,897		39.1%
2010	6,683		13.3%
2020	7,656		14.6%
2021 (est.)	7,777	▲	1.6%

=== 2020 census ===
As of the 2020 census, Kill Devil Hills had a population of 7,656. The median age was 45.2 years. 17.7% of residents were under the age of 18 and 18.7% were 65 years of age or older. For every 100 females, there were 99.2 males, and for every 100 females age 18 and over, there were 98.5 males.

100.0% of residents lived in urban areas, while 0.0% lived in rural areas.

There were 3,294 households in Kill Devil Hills, of which 25.2% had children under the age of 18 living in them. Of all households, 44.2% were married-couple households, 21.2% were households with a male householder and no spouse or partner present, and 25.7% were households with a female householder and no spouse or partner present. About 30.4% of all households were made up of individuals and 11.2% had someone living alone who was 65 years of age or older.

There were 7,020 housing units, of which 53.1% were vacant. The homeowner vacancy rate was 1.9% and the rental vacancy rate was 21.5%.

Kill Devil Hills racial composition
Race	Number	Percentage
White (non-Hispanic)	6,478	84.61%
Black or African American (non-Hispanic)	86	1.12%
Native American	25	0.33%
Asian	84	1.1%
Other/Mixed	324	4.23%
Hispanic or Latino	659	8.61%

=== 2000 census ===
As of the census of 2000, there were 5,897 people, 2,585 households, and 1,491 families residing in the town. The population density was 1,067.8 inhabitants per square mile (412.3/km^{2}). There were 5,302 housing units at an average density of 960.1 per square mile (370.7/km^{2}). The racial makeup of the town was 96.40% White, 0.61% African American, 0.17% Native American, 0.59% Asian, 0.12% Pacific Islander, 1.05% from other races, and 1.05% from two or more races. Hispanic or Latino of any race were 2.95% of the population. 26.4% had children under the age of 18 living with them, 44.2% were married couples living together, 9.6% had a female householder with no husband present, and 42.3% were non-families. 27.9% of all households were made up of individuals, and 6.5% had someone living alone who was 65 years of age or older. The average household size was 2.28 and the average family size was 2.77.

In the town, the population was spread out, with 20.9% under the age of 18, 7.5% from 18 to 24, 38.1% from 25 to 44, 22.8% from 45 to 64, and 10.7% who were 65 years of age or older. The median age was 37 years. For every 100 females, there were 105.0 males. For every 100 females age 18 and over, there were 106.3 males.

The median income for a household in the town was $39,713, and the median income for a family was $44,681. Males had a median income of $31,431 versus $23,206 for females. The per capita income for the town was $20,679. About 5.2% of families and 8.3% of the population were below the poverty line, including 7.8% of those under age 18 and 5.5% of those age 65 or over.

== Sports ==
Kill Devil Hills is home to the Outer Banks Daredevils of the Tidewater Summer League, a collegiate summer baseball league. The Daredevils play at First Flight Baseball Complex on Veterans Drive in Kill Devil Hills. The team, founded in 1997, began play in Kill Devil Hills in 2005.

== Education ==
The town is under the jurisdiction of Dare County Schools.

First Flight Elementary School and First Flight Middle School are in Kill Devil Hills, just south of the Monument. Kill Devil Hills is also served by First Flight High School. The school first opened on Tuesday, August 17, 2004, to 800 students. Previously, high school students from Kill Devil Hills attended Manteo High School.

Some portions of Kill Devil Hills are zoned to Nags Head Elementary instead of First Flight Elementary. Previously Kitty Hawk Elementary School served areas north of Colington Road/Ocean Bay Blvd while First Flight Elementary served points south. Boundaries changed when Nags Head Elementary opened in 2005.

Dare County Library has a branch in Kill Devil Hills.

== Transportation ==
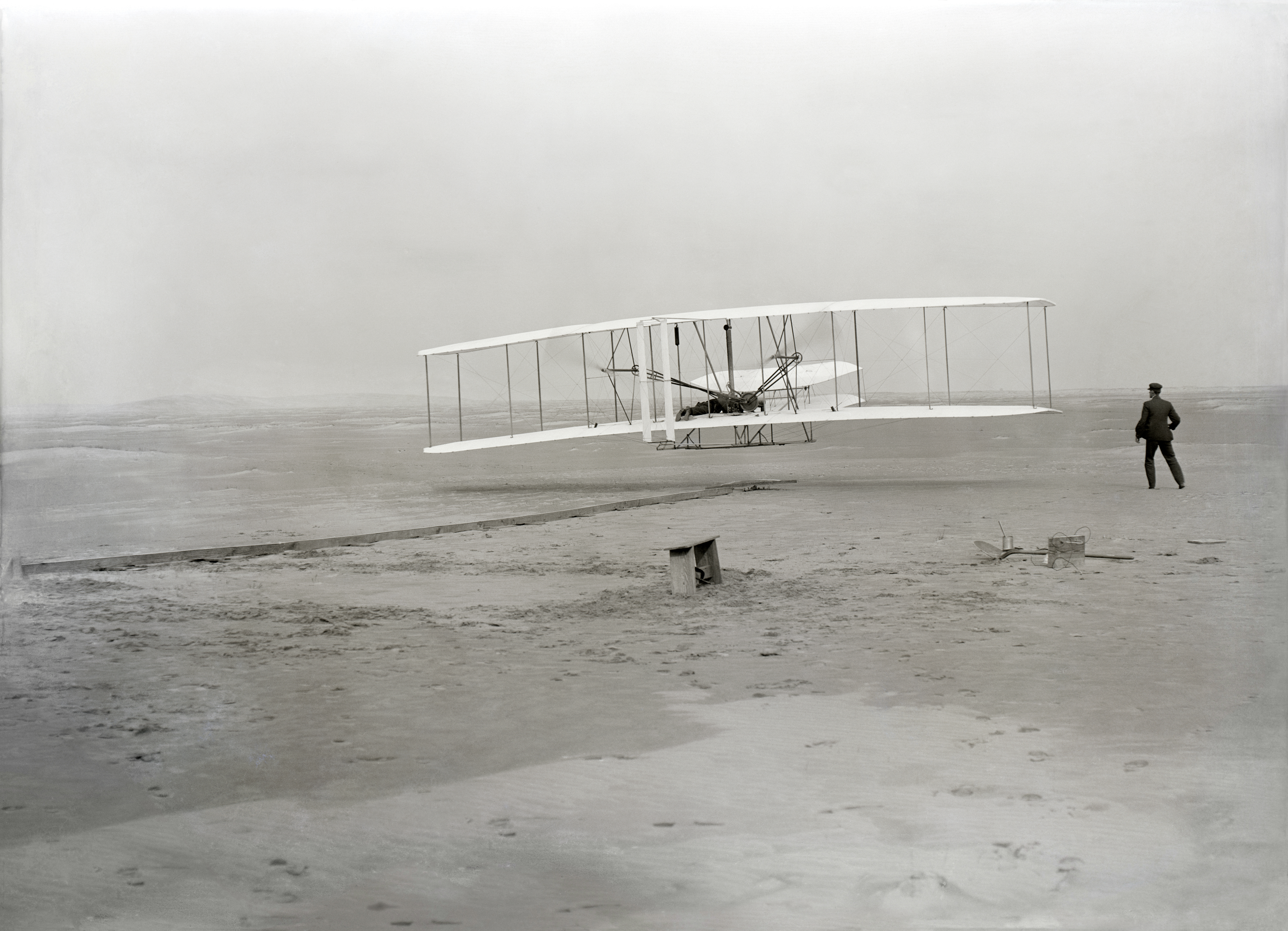
In 1903 the Wright Brothers flew the first airplane, the Wright Flyer, from land now part of Kill Devil Hills

First Flight Airport (IATA: FFA, ICAO: KFFA, FAA LID: FFA) is a public use airport which is owned by the National Park Service (NPS), and located one mile west of Kill Devil Hills.

First Flight Airport covers an area of 40 acres at an elevation of 13 feet (4 metres) above mean sea level. It has one runway; designated 3/21, with an asphalt surface measuring 3,000 by 60 feet (914 by 18 metres). For the 12-month period ending August 19, 2009, the airport had 38,120 aircraft operations, an average of 104 per day: 97% general aviation, 3% air taxi, and <1% military.

The airport is notable for being the site of hundreds of pre-flight gliding experiments carried out by the Wright brothers. The U.S. Centennial of Flight Commission chose First Flight Airport as one of the stops for the National Air Tour 2003.

== Popular culture ==
- In March 2011, it was announced that bass guitarist Rex Brown (Pantera) and drummer Vinny Appice (Heaven & Hell, Black Sabbath, Dio) had formed a new band called Kill Devil Hill.
- The closing scenes of the 1983 film Brainstorm take place at the Wright Brothers National Memorial visitor center in Kill Devil Hills.
- Dennis Anderson, creator and former driver of the Grave Digger monster truck in the Monster Jam touring series, makes his home in Kill Devil Hills, and the town's name appears on the truck's artwork, keeping with its "spooky" theme. The team's garage is located in nearby Poplar Branch.
- The 2005 album Tyranny of Souls by Bruce Dickinson (Iron Maiden frontman) contains a track titled "Kill Devil Hill", a song about the first controlled airplane flight.

Preceded by Kitty Hawk	Beaches of The Outer Banks	Succeeded by Nags Head
