= USS Colington =

USS Colington is a name used more than once by the U.S. Navy:

- The first Colington (YFB-43), formerly Elmer W. Jones, served in a noncommissioned status in the 5th Naval District during World War II.
- USS Colington (AG-148) was launched 13 January 1945 by American Bridge Co., Ambridge, Pennsylvania.
