= Harold R. Story =

US Army major general

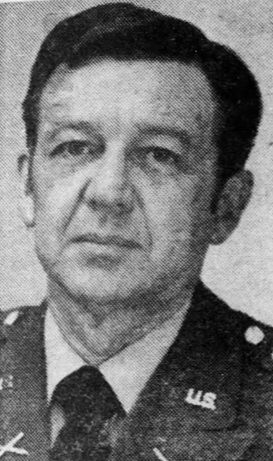
- New York Daily News, 9 July 1972
- Born: March 12, 1919; Queens, New York, US
- Died: September 7, 1987 (aged 68); Norfolk, Virginia, US
- Burial place: Arlington National Cemetery
- Education: Tufts University; United States Army Command and General Staff College
- Spouse: Violet Barbara "Babs" Little (m. 1941–1987)
- Children: 2
- Military career
- Service: United States Army
- Service years: 1940–1979
- Rank: Major General
- Service number: 01173098
- Unit: New York Army National Guard
- Commands: 187th Field Artillery Observation Battalion; 42nd Division Artillery; 42nd Infantry Division; 27th Rear Area Operations Center
- Wars: World War II; Korean War
- Awards: Bronze Star Medal
- Other work: Manager and Executive, Pioneer Plastics Corporation

Harold R. Story (12 March 1919 – 7 September 1987) was a career officer in the New York Army National Guard. A veteran of World War II and the Korean War, he was a recipient of the Bronze Star Medal. Story attained the rank of major general as commander of the 42nd Infantry Division and the 27th Rear Area Operations Center.

== Early life ==
Harold Roden Story was born in Queens, New York on 12 March 1919, the son of Harold Story and Viola Irene (Roden) Story. He attended the public schools of Queens and graduated from Newtown High School in 1937. He attended Tufts University from 1937 to 1940. In his civilian career, Story resided in Levittown and was a manager and executive with the Pioneer Plastics Corporation of Auburn, Maine.

== Start of career ==
Story enlisted in the New York National Guard's Headquarters Battery, 1-105th Field Artillery on 18 September 1940. He graduated from Officer Candidate School in 1942.

During World War II, Story served with the 7th Field Artillery Observation Battalion, a Third United States Army unit that took part in World War II combat in the European theatre. He returned to his National Guard service after the war. Story was activated for Korean War service with the Far East Command on 18 December 1951, after which he resumed his National Guard service.

In 1954, Story was a major with II Corps Artillery. In the mid-1950s, he commanded the 187th Field Artillery Observation Battalion, which was based in Brooklyn. In the late 1960s and early 1970s, Story commanded the 42nd Division Artillery with the rank of colonel.

== Continued career ==
=== Military education ===
Story's military education included:

- Field Artillery Officer Basic Course
- Field Artillery Officer Advanced Course
- United States Army Command and General Staff College

In 1972, Story was promoted to brigadier general and assigned as assistant division commander of the 42nd Infantry Division. In March 1975, Story was assigned as division commander and promoted to major general. He served in this position until 1977, when he was assigned to command of the 27th Rear Area Operations Center.

In retirement, Story resided in Duck, North Carolina. He died in Norfolk, Virginia on 7 September 1987. Story was interred at Arlington National Cemetery, columbarium 2 N-33-3.

== Dates of rank ==
Story's dates of rank were:

- Private, 18 September 1940
- Second Lieutenant, 5 November 1942
- First Lieutenant, 6 October 1943
- Captain, 15 September 1944
- Major, 3 September 1950
- Lieutenant Colonel, 13 October 1955
- Colonel, 26 January 1965
- Brigadier General, 31 May 1972
- Major General, 2 December 1975
