= Colington Island =

Island in North Carolina, United States

Coordinates: 36°00′21″N 75°42′31″W

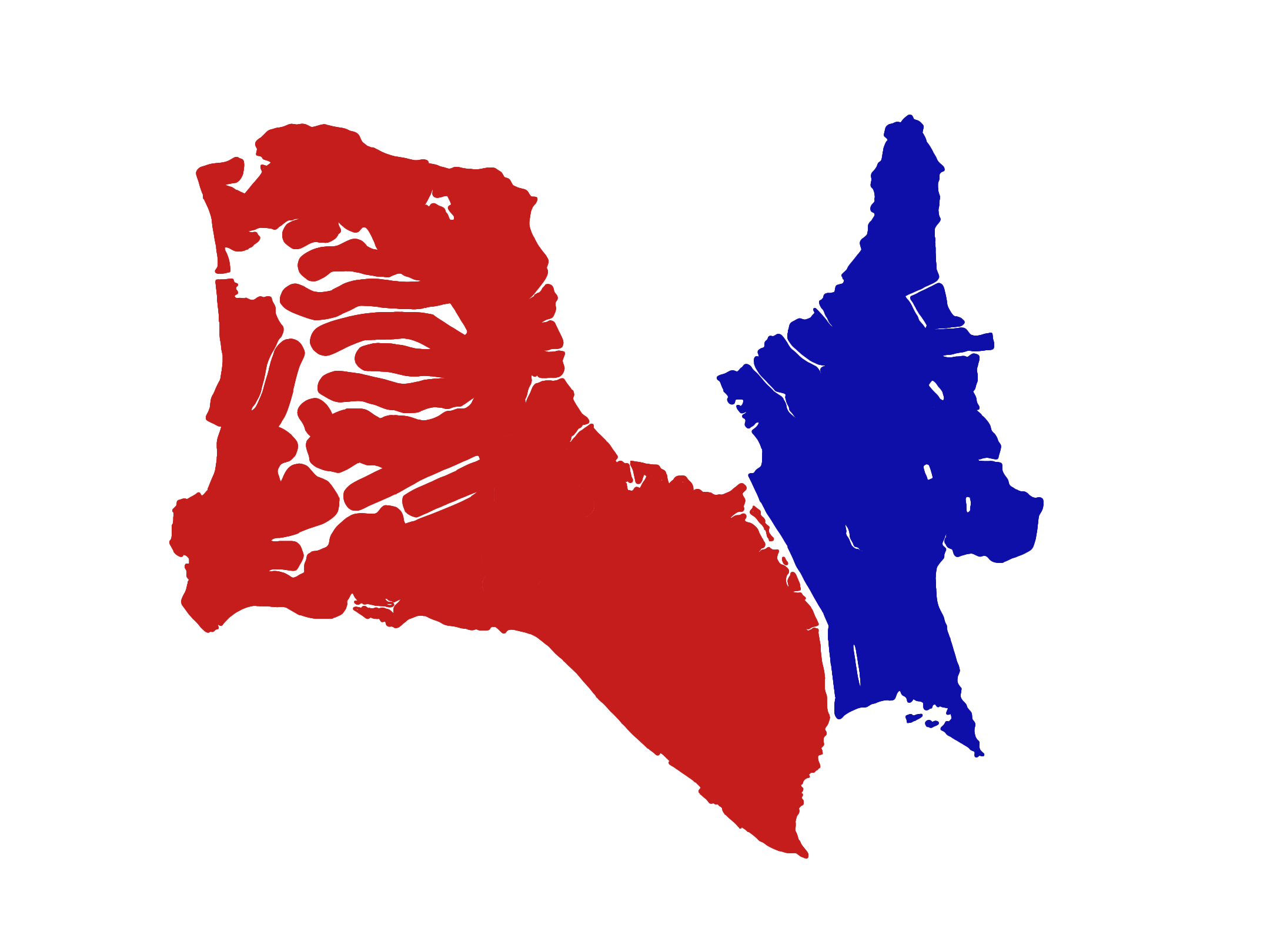
- Big Colington Island Little Colington Island

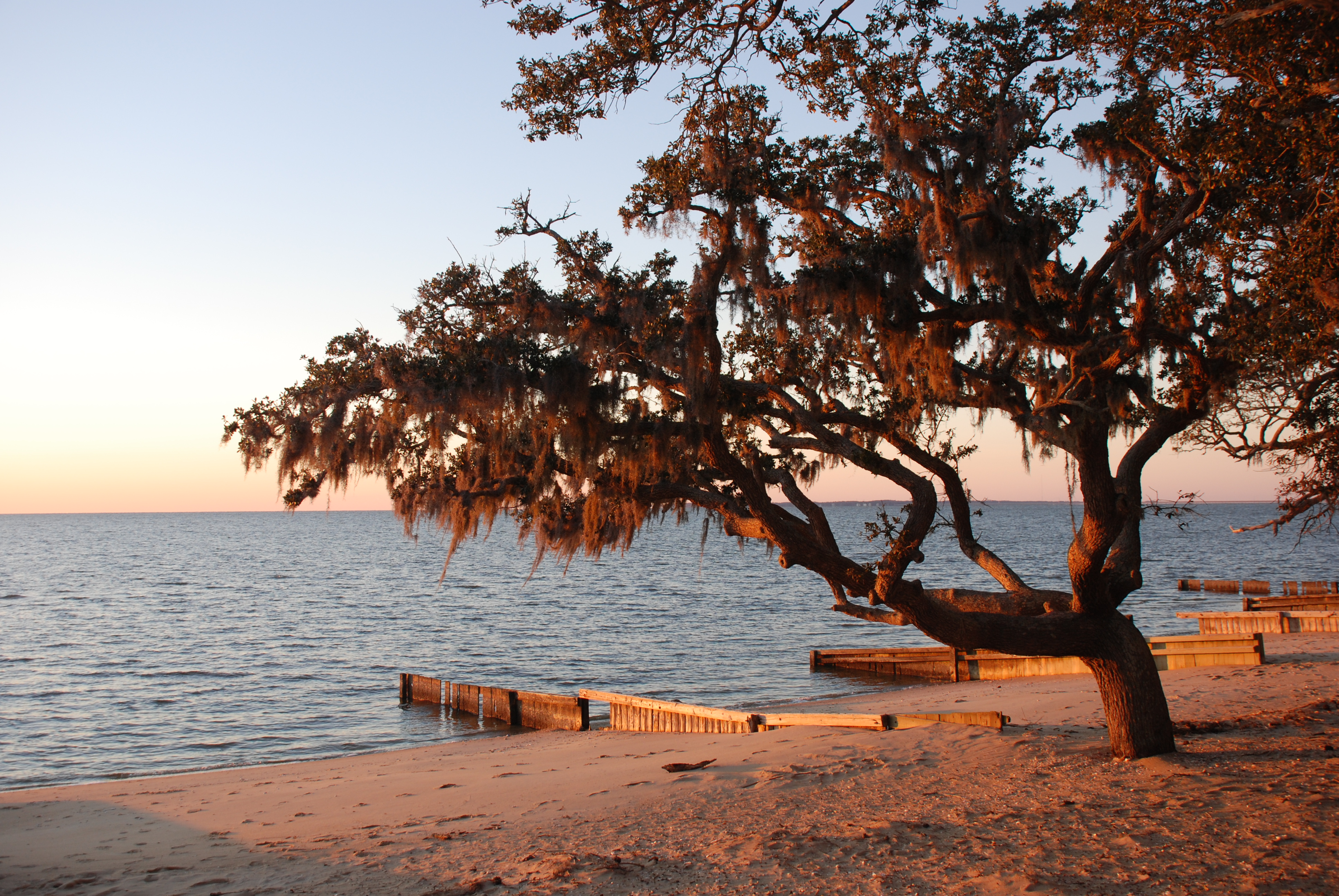
The beach at Colington Harbour

Colington Island is an island located to the west of Kill Devil Hills in Dare County, North Carolina, United States. The island is located at the converging point of Albemarle Sound, Currituck Sound, Croatan Sound, and Roanoke Sound. While it is commonly referred to as one island, there are actually two separate islands, Big Colington Island and Little Colington Island. Colington Harbour is a gated community located on Big Colington Island.

The residents of Colington Island are governed by the Dare County Board of Commissioners. Colington is part of District 2, along with the towns of Kill Devil Hills and Nags Head.

Residents are zoned to Dare County Schools. The specific schools are: First Flight Elementary School, First Flight Middle School, and First Flight High School. Prior to 2004 students in the First Flight High area were zoned to Manteo High School.
