= USS Colington (AG-148) =

Cargo ship of the United States Navy

History

United States
- Name: USS Colington
- Namesake: Colington Island off the coast of North Carolina
- Builder: American Bridge Co., Ambridge, Pennsylvania
- Laid down: as an LST-511 class tank landing ship
- Launched: 13 January 1945
- Commissioned: 21 February 1945 as USS LST-1085
- Renamed: Colington, 1 February 1949
- Reclassified: miscellaneous auxiliary (AG-148), 27 January 1949; AKS-29, 18 August 1951
- Stricken: 1 April 1960
- Fate: Stricken 1 April 1960

General characteristics
- Class & type: LST-511-class tank landing ship
- Displacement: 1,625 light; 4,080 tons full load
- Length: 328 ft (100 m)
- Beam: 50 ft (15 m)
- Draft: 14 ft 1 in (4.29 m)
- Propulsion: two General Motors 12-567 diesel engines, two shafts, twin rudders
- Speed: 11.6 knots
- Complement: 119 officers and enlisted
- Armament: eight 40 mm guns

USS Colington (AG-148/AKS-29) – also known as USS LST-1085 - was an LST-511-class tank landing ship launched by the U.S. Navy during the final months of World War II. Colington served as a supply and stores-issue ship for the U.S. 7th Fleet, and was decommissioned after the war.

== Constructed in Pennsylvania ==
The second ship to be so named by the Navy, Colington was launched 13 January 1945 by American Bridge Company, Ambridge, Pennsylvania; and commissioned 21 February 1945 as LST-1085.

== World War II-related service ==
Colington served with the U.S. Navy occupation forces in Asia after World War II,

== Post-war disposition ==
USS LST-1085 was reclassified AG-148 on 27 January and named Colington on 1 February 1949. She was again reclassified to AKS-29 on 18 August 1951.

She was struck from the Navy List 1 April 1960.
