= Stumpy Point Bay =

Bay in Dare County, North Carolina, United States

Coordinates: 35.6925°N 75.759722°W

Stumpy Point Bay is a bay in Dare County, North Carolina, United States.

Tree stumps in and around Stumpy Point Bay account for its name.
