= First Flight High School =

American public school in North Carolina

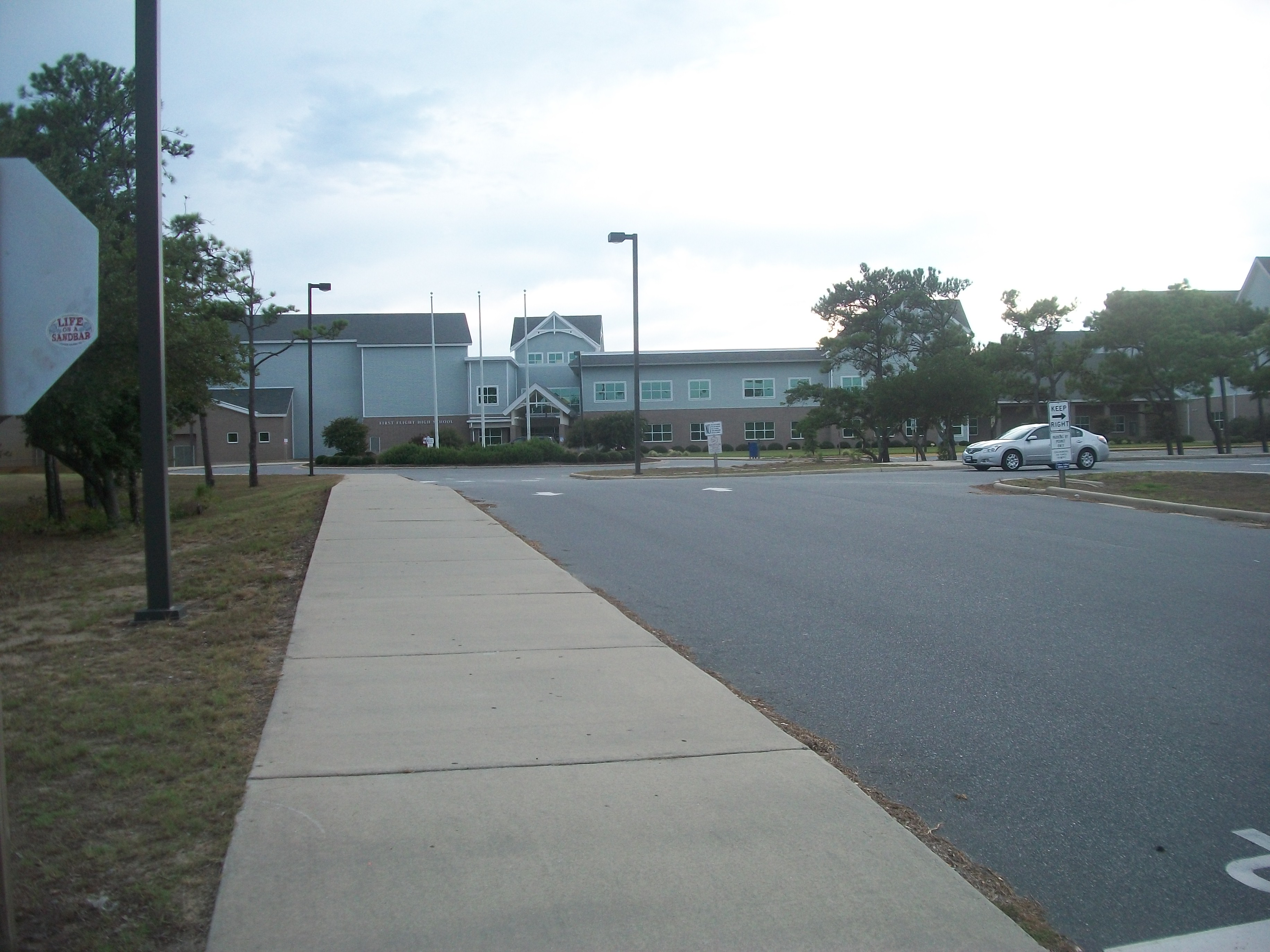
- First Flight High School in 2011

Location
- 100 Veterans Drive; Kill Devil Hills, North Carolina 27948; United States; 36°00′34″N 75°39′56″W

Information
- Type: Public
- Established: 2004 (22 years ago)
- School district: Dare County Schools
- CEEB code: 342027
- Principal: Tim Albert
- Faculty: 68
- Teaching staff: 58.58 (FTE)
- Grades: 9–12
- Enrollment: 913 (2023–2024)
- Student to teacher ratio: 15.59
- Campus type: Suburban
- Colors: Blue and white
- Mascot: Nighthawks
- Website: ffh.daretolearn.org

First Flight High School is a public high school serving grades 9–12. The school was established in 2004, and is located in Kill Devil Hills, North Carolina on the Outer Banks of North Carolina.

The school opened to students on August 17, 2004, with 800 of them in attendance coming from nearby Manteo High School. It is part of the Dare County Schools school district.

Its boundary includes Kill Devil Hills, Kitty Hawk, Southern Shores, and Duck, as well as the unincorporated area of Colington Island.

== Organization ==
The program of studies at First Flight High School offers approximately 170 courses within nine disciplines. Students may enroll in average and honors levels in most of the core subjects. The school changed in 2007–2008 to a hybrid schedule. In a hybrid schedule, students can take three yearlong classes and four semester block classes with the potential to earn seven credits annually.

== Accreditation ==
- Southern Association of Colleges and Schools
- North Carolina Department of Public Instruction

== Notable alumni ==
- Alexis Knapp (2007) – model, actress, and singer credited in movies Project X, Pitch Perfect, etc.
