= Dare County Schools =

School district in North Carolina, United States

Coordinates: 35.97676°N 75.63841°W

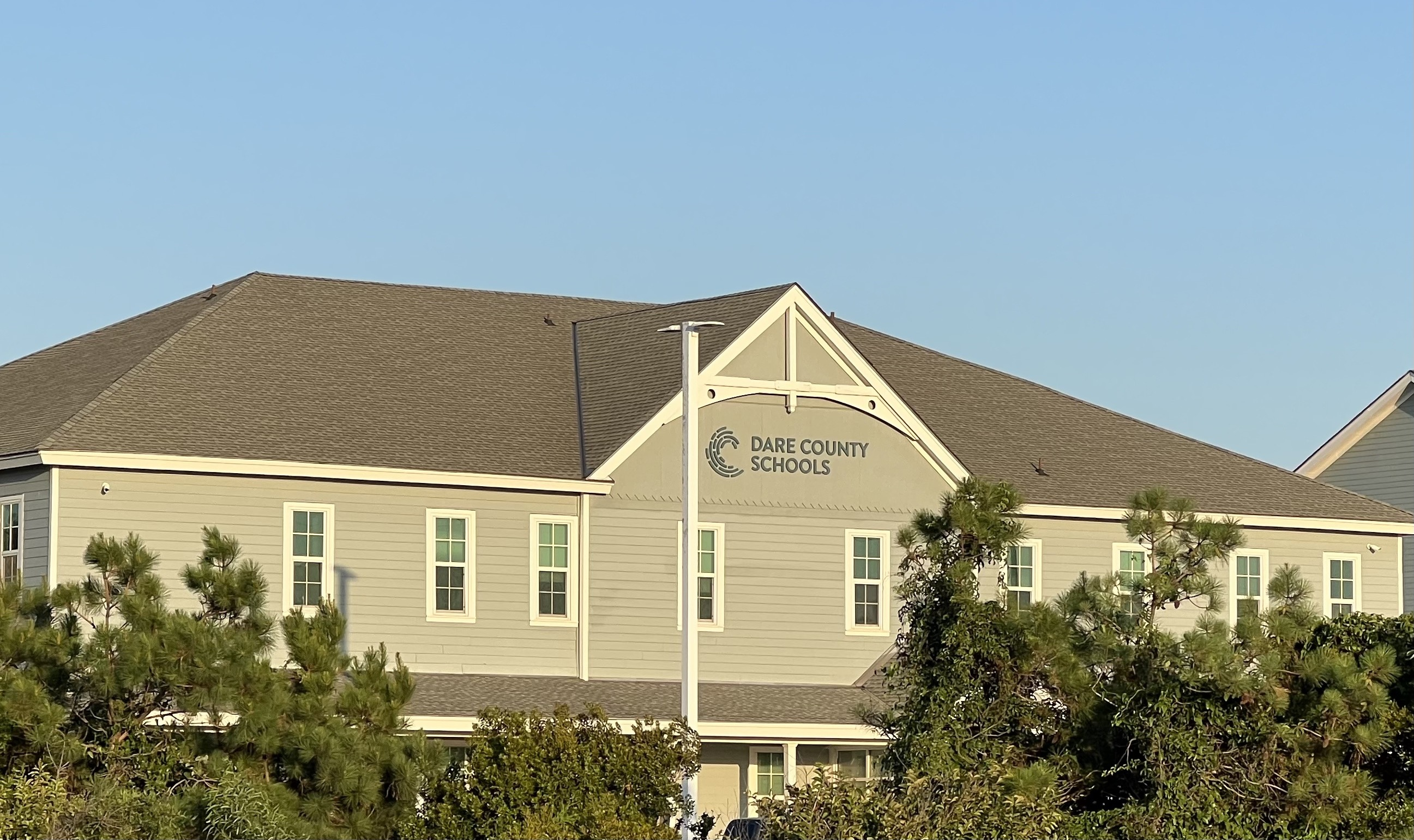
Dare County Schools headquarters

Dare County Schools (DCS) is a school district for Dare County, North Carolina. Its headquarters are in Nags Head.

In 2008 the district began serving salads in the cafeterias. The cafeteria manager of First Flight High School stated that the salads had a good reception.

In 2008 the principals of Nags Head Elementary and First Flight Middle switched positions.

In 2020 John Farrelly, the superintendent, stated on December 8, 2020, that the district administrators needed to select which programs to make student achievement equal across socioeconomic groups should be implemented.

== Facilities ==
The district, for a period, used a rented facility in Manteo. In 2005 the current headquarters on the property of Nags Head Elementary was to open.

== Schools ==
Middle and high schools

- Cape Hatteras Secondary School

High schools

- First Flight High School
- Manteo High School

Middle schools

- First Flight Middle School
- Manteo Middle School

Elementary schools

- Cape Hatteras Elementary School
- First Flight Elementary School
  - It serves students in portions of Kill Devil Hills and Colington Island. Its official capacity is 410 students. In 2004 it was overcrowded with 590 students but it was relieved the following year by the opening of Nags Head Elementary.
- Kitty Hawk Elementary School
  - Its official capacity is 590 students. In 2004 it was overcrowded with 710 students but it was relieved the following year by the opening of Nags Head Elementary.
- Manteo Elementary School
- Nags Head Elementary School
  - Nags Head Elementary opened in August 2005, relieving First Flight and Kitty Hawk elementaries. Its prospective enrollment for 2005 was 500, about half each from the two other elementaries. It was a part of a $16,900,000 development including the new district headquarters.

Alternative

- Alternative High School
