= Manteo High School =

American public school in North Carolina

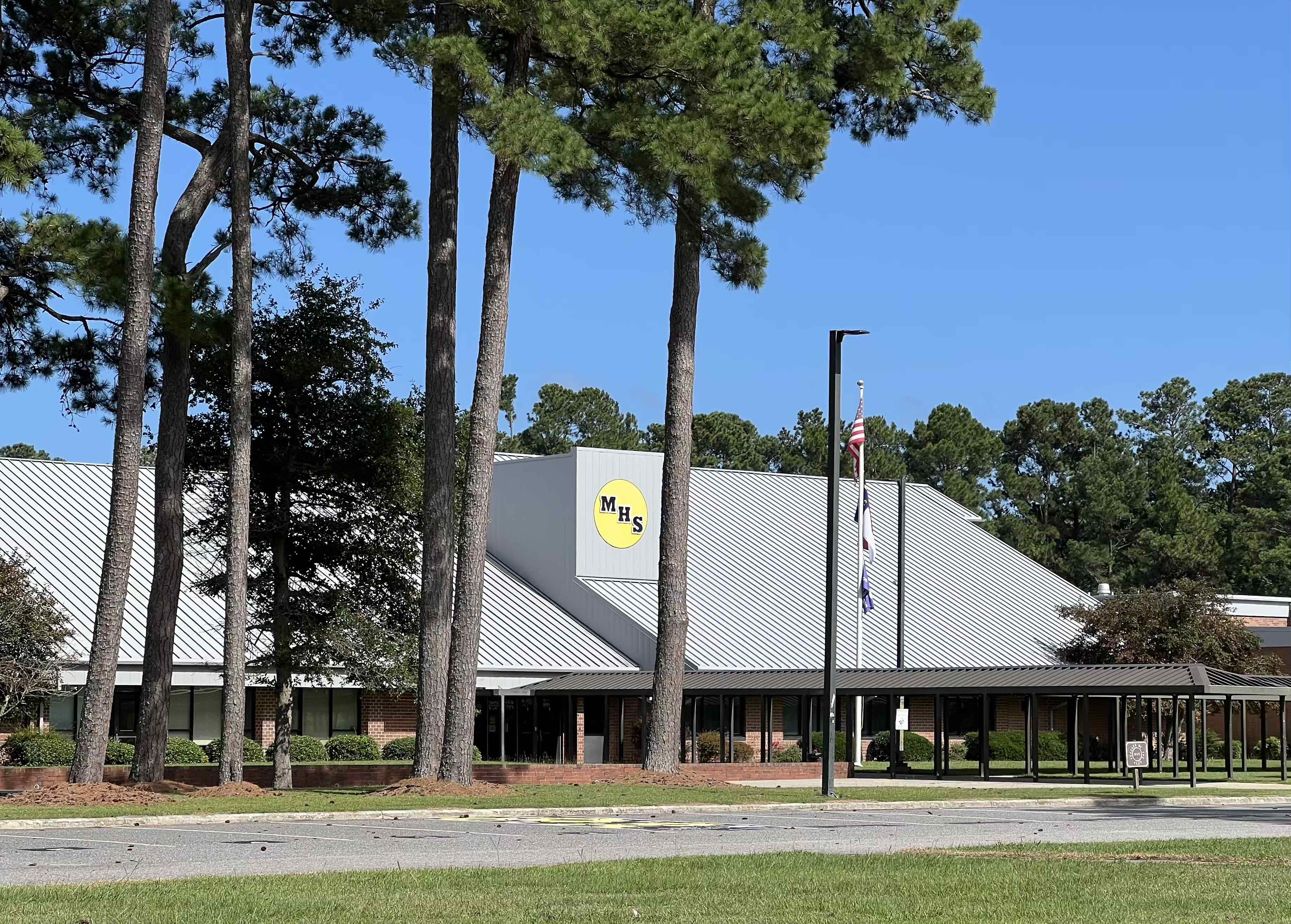

Location
- 829 Wingina Avenue; Manteo, North Carolina 27954; United States; 35°54′57″N 75°40′27″W

Information
- School type: Public
- Motto: Proud of our Tradition...Excited about our Future
- Opened: 1983 (43 years ago)
- School district: Dare County Schools
- CEEB code: 342470
- Principal: John J. Luciano
- Staff: 60
- Teaching staff: 38.38 (FTE)
- Grades: 9–12
- Enrollment: 530 (2023–2024)
- Average class size: 18
- Student to teacher ratio: 13.81
- Schedule type: 5-period Hybrid Block
- Hours in school day: 7.05
- Colors: Black and gold
- Athletics: Women's Baseball, Men's Basketball, Basketball, Cheerleading, Cross-Country, Football, Golf, Men's Soccer, Women's Soccer, Men's Softball, Men's Tennis, Women's Tennis, Track, Volleyball, Wrestling, Swimming
- Mascot: Redskins
- Rival: First Flight High School
- Newspaper: Sound To Sea
- Yearbook: Sandfiddler
- Feeder schools: Manteo Middle School; First Flight Middle School
- Website: mhs.daretolearn.org

Manteo High School is one of ten schools located in Dare County, North Carolina. The high school was named after the Native American chief Manteo, who assisted the Roanoke Colony. Renovations to the school were completed in 2007.

In addition to Manteo it serves Nags Head and other parts of Roanoke Island (including Wanchese) as well as portions of Dare County on the North Carolina mainland (including Manns Harbor and Stumpy Point).

== History ==
In 2003 enrollment was over 1,200. In 2004 First Flight High School opened, relieving Manteo High, taking about 800 students. Enrollment at Manteo High was down to 530.

== Sports ==
Manteo's sports teams play under the name "Redskins". The school has teams for 22 varsity sports, as well as 5 JV sports. Manteo is a 2A school and is a member of the Albemarle Athletic Conference (AAC). Their local rival is First Flight High School, which is a 4A school approximately 15 miles away.

=== Mascot ===
The school's mascot is the Redskins. Decades of controversy surround the intention of the name, most notably in 2002 when the NC State Board of Education and State Advisory Council on Indian Education sent an action statement to the state's 117 school districts requesting they review their policies and procedures toward Indian mascots. Former State Board of Education member, Eddie Davis, spoke against the Redskins mascot during the public comment period of a Dare County Board of Education meeting in Sept 2008. Following the murder of George Floyd and the Washington Redskins name controversy in 2020, rival campaigns to either retire or retain the mascot circulated. In June, 2020 the chief of the local Algonquian Indians of NC Roanoke-Hatteras Council issued a statement requesting the mascot be removed. On October 13, 2020, the Dare County School Board voted to endorse the Manteo High School Redskins and Manteo Middle School Braves.

== Notable alumni ==
- George Ackles, professional basketball player
- Marc Basnight, NC State Senator representing the 1st district from 1984–2011
- Emanuel Davis, Canadian Football League defensive back
- Stan M. White, NC State Senator representing the 1st district from 2011–2012
