= 2004 United States presidential election in North Carolina =

- November 2, 2004
- Turnout: 64.26% (▲5.38 pp)

Nominee	George W. Bush	John Kerry
Party	Republican	Democratic
Home state	Texas	Massachusetts
Running mate	Dick Cheney	John Edwards
Electoral vote	15	0
Popular vote	1,961,166	1,525,849
Percentage	56.02%	43.58%

Bush
40–50%
50–60%
60–70%
70–80%
80–90%
90–100%
Kerry
40–50%
50–60%
60–70%
70–80%
80–90%
90–100%
Tie
President before election
George W. Bush
Republican
Elected President
George W. Bush
Republican

The 2004 United States presidential election in North Carolina took place on November 2, 2004, and was part of the 2004 United States presidential election. Voters chose 15 representatives, or electors to the Electoral College, who voted for president and vice president.

North Carolina was won by incumbent President George W. Bush by a 12.44% margin of victory. Prior to the election, all 12 news organizations considered this a state Bush would win, or a red state. North Carolina was also the home state of Democratic Party vice presidential nominee John Edwards, who was then representing the state in the United States Senate. This was not enough for Democrats to break Republican success in this state since Jimmy Carter's victory in 1976. While winning the state comfortably, Bush's margin of 12.44% was 0.39% lower than his 2000 performance, making it the only Southern state to swing more Democratic than 2000.

Bush became the first Republican to win the White House without carrying Mecklenburg or Guilford counties since Calvin Coolidge in 1924.

As of 2024, this remains the last time that North Carolina has been decided by a double-digit margin in a presidential election.

== Primaries ==
- 2004 North Carolina Democratic presidential caucuses

== Campaign ==
=== Predictions ===
There were 12 news organizations who made state-by-state predictions of the election. Here are their last predictions before election day.

Source	Ranking
D.C. Political Report	Likely R
Cook Political Report	Lean R
Research 2000	Lean R
Zogby International	Likely R
Washington Post	Likely R
Washington Dispatch	Likely R
Washington Times	Solid R
The New York Times	Solid R
CNN	Likely R
Newsweek	Lean R
Associated Press	Lean R
Rasmussen Reports	Likely R

=== Polling ===
Bush won every single pre-election poll. The final 3-poll average showed Bush leading 52% to 44%.

=== Fundraising ===
Bush raised $4,465,160. Kerry raised $2,049,794.

=== Advertising and visits ===
Neither campaign advertised or visited the state during the fall campaign.

== Analysis ==
John Edwards failed to make his home state competitive in the general election. In 2000, George W. Bush had performed strongly in most of the South, including North Carolina, which he had won by 12.83%. As in most of the rest of the South, he did so once again in North Carolina, notwithstanding Edwards' presence on the Democratic ticket, although his margin of victory did go down slightly, to 12.44%, even as nationally he improved from losing the popular vote by 0.5% to winning it by 2.5%. Bush consistently led in polling leading up to election day.

Bush won a majority of the 100 counties and congressional districts. The only region in the state that Kerry dominated in was the Northeastern black belt, the location of North Carolina's 1st congressional district. However, Kerry did narrowly flip two heavily populated counties, Mecklenburg and Guilford, which have gone on to give Democrats over 55% of the vote in every subsequent election as of 2024. He also cut Bush's margin in another heavily populated county, Wake, from 7.1% to 2.1%. As of 2024, Wake has gone on to give Democrats over 55% of the vote in every subsequent election save 2012. Large Democratic margins in these counties have been instrumental to making North Carolina competitive in every election from 2008 onward.

As of the 2024 presidential election, this is the last election in which Pitt County, Forsyth County, Wilson County, Wake County, Buncombe County, and Cumberland County voted for a Republican presidential candidate. This is also the last presidential race in where any candidate won North Carolina by double digits, as well as the last time the state was not seriously contested.

== Results ==
2004 United States presidential election in North Carolina
Party	Candidate	Running mate	Votes	Percentage	Electoral votes
Republican	George W. Bush (incumbent)	Richard Cheney (incumbent)	1,961,166	56.02%	15
Democratic	John Kerry	John Edwards	1,525,849	43.58%	0
Libertarian	Michael Badnarik	Richard Campagna	11,731	0.34%	0
Others	N/A	N/A	2,261	0.06%	0
Totals			3,501,007	100%	15
Voter turnout (Voting Age population)					55.4%

=== By county ===
County	George W. Bush Republican		John Kerry Democratic		Various candidates Other parties		Margin		Total
County	#	%	#	%	#	%	#	%	Total
Alamance	33,302	61.47%	20,686	38.18%	187	0.35%	12,616	23.29%	54,175
Alexander	10,928	70.05%	4,618	29.60%	54	0.34%	6,310	40.45%	15,600
Alleghany	2,883	59.73%	1,922	39.82%	22	0.45%	961	19.91%	4,827
Anson	3,796	41.15%	5,413	58.68%	16	0.17%	−1,617	−17.53%	9,225
Ashe	7,292	61.68%	4,477	37.87%	54	0.46%	2,815	23.81%	11,823
Avery	5,678	75.47%	1,805	23.99%	41	0.55%	3,873	51.48%	7,524
Beaufort	12,432	63.68%	7,025	35.99%	65	0.34%	5,407	27.69%	19,522
Bertie	3,057	38.06%	4,938	61.48%	37	0.46%	−1,881	−23.42%	8,032
Bladen	6,174	50.14%	6,109	49.61%	30	0.24%	65	0.53%	12,313
Brunswick	22,925	60.37%	14,903	39.24%	149	0.39%	8,022	21.13%	37,977
Buncombe	52,491	49.99%	51,868	49.39%	654	0.63%	623	0.60%	105,013
Burke	18,922	61.51%	11,728	38.12%	112	0.37%	7,194	23.39%	30,762
Cabarrus	40,780	67.05%	19,803	32.56%	241	0.40%	20,977	34.49%	60,824
Caldwell	21,186	67.58%	9,999	31.90%	163	0.52%	11,187	35.68%	31,348
Camden	2,480	64.75%	1,339	34.96%	11	0.29%	1,141	29.79%	3,830
Carteret	17,716	69.27%	7,732	30.23%	127	0.50%	9,984	39.04%	25,575
Caswell	4,868	51.58%	4,539	48.10%	30	0.32%	329	3.48%	9,437
Catawba	39,602	67.48%	18,858	32.13%	228	0.39%	20,744	35.35%	58,688
Chatham	12,892	49.73%	12,897	49.75%	133	0.51%	−5	−0.02%	25,922
Cherokee	7,517	67.12%	3,635	32.46%	47	0.42%	3,882	34.66%	11,199
Chowan	2,967	55.09%	2,406	44.67%	13	0.24%	561	10.42%	5,386
Clay	3,209	65.95%	1,628	33.46%	29	0.59%	1,581	32.49%	4,866
Cleveland	22,750	61.36%	14,215	38.34%	114	0.31%	8,535	23.02%	37,079
Columbus	10,773	50.84%	10,343	48.81%	75	0.36%	430	2.03%	21,191
Craven	23,575	62.44%	14,019	37.13%	162	0.43%	9,556	25.31%	37,756
Cumberland	49,139	51.60%	45,788	48.08%	299	0.31%	3,351	3.52%	95,226
Currituck	6,013	66.99%	2,909	32.41%	54	0.60%	3,104	34.58%	8,976
Dare	9,345	60.10%	6,136	39.46%	67	0.43%	3,209	20.64%	15,548
Davidson	42,075	70.72%	17,191	28.89%	230	0.39%	24,884	41.81%	59,496
Davie	12,372	74.17%	4,233	25.38%	75	0.45%	8,139	48.79%	16,680
Duplin	9,611	57.96%	6,923	41.75%	49	0.30%	2,688	16.21%	16,583
Durham	34,614	31.57%	74,524	67.96%	513	0.47%	−39,910	−36.39%	109,651
Edgecombe	8,163	38.73%	12,877	61.09%	39	0.19%	−4,714	−22.36%	21,079
Forsyth	75,294	54.12%	63,340	45.53%	491	0.35%	11,954	8.59%	139,125
Franklin	11,540	55.17%	9,286	44.39%	92	0.44%	2,254	10.78%	20,918
Gaston	43,252	67.84%	20,254	31.77%	249	0.39%	22,998	36.07%	63,755
Gates	1,924	47.47%	2,121	52.33%	8	0.20%	−197	−4.86%	4,053
Graham	2,693	67.54%	1,272	31.90%	22	0.56%	1,421	35.64%	3,987
Granville	9,491	51.02%	9,057	48.69%	53	0.28%	434	2.33%	18,601
Greene	3,800	58.71%	2,665	41.18%	7	0.11%	1,135	17.53%	6,472
Guilford	98,254	49.30%	100,042	50.19%	1,018	0.51%	−1,788	−0.89%	199,314
Halifax	8,088	41.17%	11,528	58.68%	31	0.16%	−3,440	−17.51%	19,647
Harnett	20,922	64.24%	11,563	35.50%	86	0.26%	9,359	28.74%	32,571
Haywood	14,545	56.09%	11,237	43.33%	150	0.58%	3,308	12.76%	25,932
Henderson	28,025	64.82%	15,003	34.70%	206	0.48%	13,022	30.12%	43,234
Hertford	2,942	36.18%	5,141	63.22%	49	0.61%	−2,199	−27.04%	8,132
Hoke	5,257	47.41%	5,794	52.25%	37	0.33%	−267	−4.84%	11,088
Hyde	1,235	53.86%	1,048	45.70%	10	0.43%	187	8.16%	2,293
Iredell	38,675	67.88%	18,065	31.71%	233	0.41%	20,610	36.17%	56,973
Jackson	7,351	51.86%	6,737	47.53%	86	0.61%	614	4.33%	14,174
Johnston	36,903	67.89%	17,266	31.76%	188	0.35%	19,637	36.13%	54,357
Jones	2,607	57.77%	1,893	41.95%	13	0.29%	714	15.82%	4,513
Lee	11,834	60.55%	7,657	39.18%	52	0.27%	4,177	21.37%	19,543
Lenoir	12,939	55.82%	10,207	44.04%	33	0.14%	2,732	11.78%	23,179
Lincoln	20,052	67.79%	9,434	31.89%	93	0.32%	10,618	35.90%	29,579
Macon	9,448	62.89%	5,489	36.53%	87	0.58%	3,959	26.36%	15,024
Madison	5,175	54.69%	4,234	44.74%	54	0.57%	941	9.95%	9,463
Martin	5,334	51.03%	5,102	48.81%	16	0.15%	232	2.22%	10,452
McDowell	10,590	66.18%	5,330	33.31%	82	0.51%	5,260	32.87%	16,002
Mecklenburg	155,084	48.00%	166,828	51.63%	1,190	0.37%	−11,744	−3.63%	323,102
Mitchell	5,686	72.92%	2,080	26.67%	32	0.41%	3,606	46.25%	7,798
Montgomery	5,745	56.99%	4,313	42.79%	22	0.22%	1,432	14.20%	10,080
Moore	24,714	64.39%	13,555	35.32%	113	0.30%	11,159	29.07%	38,382
Nash	21,902	58.14%	15,693	41.66%	78	0.21%	9,779	16.48%	37,673
New Hanover	45,351	55.82%	35,572	43.78%	324	0.40%	12,616	12.04%	81,247
Northampton	3,176	36.21%	5,584	63.67%	10	0.11%	−2,408	−27.46%	8,770
Onslow	25,890	69.45%	11,250	30.18%	137	0.37%	14,640	39.27%	37,277
Orange	20,771	32.38%	42,910	66.89%	472	0.74%	−22,139	−34.51%	64,153
Pamlico	3,679	60.93%	2,335	38.67%	24	0.40%	1,344	22.26%	6,038
Pasquotank	6,609	48.42%	6,984	51.17%	55	0.41%	−375	−2.75%	13,648
Pender	10,037	58.75%	6,999	40.97%	49	0.28%	3,038	17.78%	17,085
Perquimans	2,965	59.80%	1,971	39.75%	22	0.44%	994	20.05%	4,958
Person	8,973	58.98%	6,198	40.74%	43	0.28%	2,775	18.24%	15,214
Pitt	28,590	53.30%	24,924	46.46%	129	0.24%	3,666	6.84%	53,643
Polk	5,140	56.98%	3,787	41.98%	94	1.05%	1,353	15.00%	9,021
Randolph	37,771	74.19%	12,966	25.47%	173	0.34%	24,805	48.72%	50,910
Richmond	7,709	47.75%	8,383	51.92%	53	0.33%	−674	−4.17%	16,145
Robeson	15,909	46.97%	17,868	52.75%	94	0.28%	−1,959	−5.78%	33,871
Rockingham	22,840	61.09%	14,430	38.60%	118	0.32%	8,410	22.49%	37,388
Rowan	34,915	67.32%	16,735	32.27%	217	0.42%	18,180	35.05%	51,867
Rutherford	16,343	66.28%	8,184	33.19%	131	0.53%	8,159	33.09%	24,658
Sampson	12,600	56.53%	9,649	43.29%	39	0.17%	2,951	13.24%	22,288
Scotland	5,141	44.52%	6,386	55.30%	20	0.17%	−1,245	−10.78%	11,547
Stanly	17,814	69.71%	7,650	29.94%	89	0.35%	10,164	39.77%	25,553
Stokes	13,583	69.96%	5,767	29.71%	64	0.33%	7,816	40.25%	19,414
Surry	17,587	67.66%	8,304	31.95%	101	0.39%	9,283	35.71%	25,992
Swain	2,593	51.41%	2,419	47.96%	32	0.64%	174	3.45%	5,044
Transylvania	9,386	60.21%	6,097	39.11%	105	0.68%	3,289	21.10%	15,588
Tyrrell	855	53.77%	731	45.97%	4	0.25%	124	7.80%	1,590
Union	42,820	70.20%	17,974	29.47%	207	0.34%	24,846	40.73%	61,001
Vance	6,884	43.91%	8,762	55.89%	31	0.20%	−1,878	−11.98%	15,677
Wake	177,324	50.83%	169,909	48.71%	1,611	0.46%	7,415	2.12%	348,844
Warren	2,840	35.38%	5,171	64.42%	16	0.20%	−2,331	−29.04%	8,027
Washington	2,484	45.40%	2,969	54.27%	18	0.33%	−485	−8.87%	5,471
Watauga	12,659	52.64%	11,232	46.70%	159	0.66%	1,427	5.94%	24,050
Wayne	24,883	62.14%	15,076	37.65%	87	0.22%	9,807	24.49%	40,046
Wilkes	19,197	70.70%	7,862	28.95%	95	0.35%	11,335	41.75%	27,154
Wilson	16,264	53.26%	14,206	46.52%	65	0.21%	2,058	6.74%	30,535
Yadkin	11,816	77.16%	3,451	22.54%	46	0.30%	8,365	54.62%	15,313
Yancey	4,940	52.38%	4,434	47.02%	57	0.60%	506	5.36%	9,431
Totals	1,961,166	56.02%	1,525,849	43.58%	13,992	0.40%	435,317	12.44%	3,501,007

==== Counties that flipped from Democratic to Republican ====
- Bladen (largest municipality: Elizabethtown)
- Chowan (largest municipality: Edenton)
- Columbus (largest municipality: Whiteville)
- Cumberland (largest municipality: Fayetteville)
- Granville (largest municipality: Oxford)
- Martin (largest municipality: Williamston)
- Tyrrell (largest municipality: Columbia)

==== Counties that flipped from Republican to Democratic ====
- Guilford (largest municipality: Greensboro)
- Mecklenburg (largest municipality: Charlotte)

=== By congressional district ===
Bush won nine of 13 congressional districts, including two held by Democrats.

District	Bush	Kerry	Representative
1st	42%	57%	G. K. Butterfield
2nd	54%	46%	Bob Etheridge
3rd	68%	32%	Walter B. Jones
4th	44%	55%	David Price
5th	66%	33%	Richard Burr
5th	66%	33%	Virginia Foxx
6th	69%	30%	Howard Coble
7th	56%	44%	Mike McIntyre
8th	54%	45%	Robin Hayes
9th	63%	36%	Sue Wilkins Myrick
10th	67%	33%	Cass Ballenger
10th	67%	33%	Patrick McHenry
11th	57%	43%	Charles H. Taylor
12th	37%	63%	Mel Watt
13th	47%	52%	Brad Miller

== Electors ==
Technically the voters of North Carolina cast their ballots for electors: representatives to the Electoral College. North Carolina is allocated 15 electors because it has 13 congressional districts and 2 senators. All candidates who appear on the ballot or qualify to receive write-in votes must submit a list of 15 electors, who pledge to vote for their candidate and his or her running mate. Whoever wins the majority of votes in the state is awarded all 15 electoral votes. Their chosen electors then vote for president and vice president. Although electors are pledged to their candidate and running mate, they are not obligated to vote for them. An elector who votes for someone other than his or her candidate is known as a faithless elector.

The electors of each state and the District of Columbia met on December 13, 2004, to cast their votes for president and vice president. The Electoral College itself never meets as one body. Instead the electors from each state and the District of Columbia met in their respective capitols.

The following were the members of the Electoral College from the state. All were pledged to and voted for Bush/Cheney:

1. Joseph W. Powell
2. Ann Sullivan
3. William B. Carraway
4. Sandra Carter
5. William H. Trotter
6. Thomas D. Luckadoo
7. Judy Keener
8. Marcia M. Spiegel
9. Dewitt Rhoades
10. Davey G. Williamson
11. Theresa Esposito
12. Elizabeth Kelly
13. Larry W. Potts
14. Joe Morgan
15. Robert Rector
