= 2012 United States presidential election in North Carolina =

- November 6, 2012
- Turnout: 68.40% (▼1.13 pp)

Nominee	Mitt Romney	Barack Obama
Party	Republican	Democratic
Home state	Massachusetts	Illinois
Running mate	Paul Ryan	Joe Biden
Electoral vote	15	0
Popular vote	2,270,395	2,178,391
Percentage	50.39%	48.35%

Romney
40–50%
50–60%
60–70%
70–80%
80–90%
90–100%
Obama
40–50%
50–60%
60–70%
70–80%
80–90%
90–100%
President before election
Barack Obama
Democratic
Elected President
Barack Obama
Democratic

The 2012 United States presidential election in North Carolina took place on November 6, 2012, as part of the 2012 general election in which all 50 states plus the District of Columbia participated. North Carolina voters chose 15 electors to represent them in the Electoral College via a popular vote pitting incumbent Democratic President Barack Obama and his running mate, Vice President Joe Biden, against Republican challenger and former Massachusetts Governor Mitt Romney and his running mate, U.S. Representative Paul Ryan.

Romney narrowly carried the state of North Carolina, winning 50.39% of the vote to Obama's 48.35%, a margin of 2.04 percentage points. North Carolina was one of just two states (along with Indiana) that flipped from voting for Obama in 2008 to voting Republican in 2012. Like Indiana, North Carolina had been a reliably Republican state prior to Obama's 2008 win, having not previously gone Democratic since 1976. Unlike Indiana, however, North Carolina was still considered a competitive swing state in 2012, and both campaigns targeted it heavily, with the Democrats holding their convention in Charlotte. Romney was the first presidential candidate since Zachary Taylor in 1848 to carry North Carolina while losing both Wake County and Mecklenburg County, the two most populous counties and home to the cities of Raleigh and Charlotte, respectively. Romney also became the third-ever Republican to carry North Carolina without winning the presidency after George H. W. Bush in 1992 and Bob Dole in 1996 and this feat would be reprised by Donald Trump in 2020.

Obama became the first ever Democratic incumbent to win the state only once and then win re-election without it. Although Obama lost North Carolina to Romney, he received more votes than he received in 2008, garnering 35,740 more.

Obama became the first Democrat ever to win the presidency without Caswell and Hyde counties. As of the 2024 presidential election, this is the last time where the Republican presidential candidate won Watauga County and where the Democratic presidential candidate won Bladen County, Gates County, Granville County, Martin County, Richmond County, and Robeson County.

== Primary elections ==
=== Democratic primary ===
The 2012 North Carolina Democratic primary was held May 8, 2012. North Carolina awarded 157 delegates proportionally.

No candidate ran against incumbent President Barack Obama in North Carolina's Democratic presidential preference primary. Obama received 766,079 votes, or 79.23% of the vote, with the remainder (200,810 votes, or 20.77%) going to elect delegates with "No Preference".

At the North Carolina Democratic state convention, 152 delegates were awarded to Obama, with 5 delegates remaining unannounced.

Democratic primary election in North Carolina
Candidate	Votes	Percentage	Awarded delegates
Barack Obama (incumbent)	766,077	79.23%	104
No Preference	200,810	20.77%	43
Totals	966,889	100.00%	104

=== Republican primary ===
The 2012 North Carolina Republican primary was held May 8, 2012. North Carolina awarded 55 delegates proportionally. Ron Paul and Mitt Romney were the only active contenders on the ballot. By the time of the primary, Romney had already been declared the party's presumptive nominee.

Romney won the North Carolina GOP presidential primary with 65.62% of the vote. Paul (with 11.12% of the vote) narrowly edged out Santorum (with 10.39% of the vote), and Gingrich came in last with 7.64% of the vote. 5.23% of voters registered "no preference". The awarded delegate count from North Carolina's Republican state convention was Romney with 48 delegates and Paul with 7 delegates.

Republican primary election in North Carolina
Candidate	Votes	Percentage	Awarded delegates
Mitt Romney	638,601	65.62%	48
Ron Paul	108,217	11.12%	7
Rick Santorum (withdrawn)	101,093	10.39%	
Newt Gingrich (withdrawn)	74,367	7.64%	
No Preference	50,928	5.23%	
Totals	973,206	100.00%	55

== General election ==
=== Polling ===
Throughout most of 2011, Obama won or tied with Romney in every poll. On September 25, 2011, Romney won a poll for the first time, 50% to 39%. Until May 2012, Obama had a consistent but narrow lead over Romney. Throughout the summer of 2012, the tide changed with Romney winning more polls than Obama. In September, Obama's momentum rose and Obama won most polls in September 2012. In October, the tide changed in Romney's favor, and Obama had not won a poll since October 1, 2012. Romney won every poll for the first three weeks in October, but then many polls came as tied between Obama and Romney. Romney led the last poll 50% to 46%, but the second last poll was tied. The last three polls showed an average of Romney leading 49% to 48%, which was accurate compared to the results.

=== Predictions ===
Source	Ranking	As of
Huffington Post	Tossup	November 6, 2012
CNN	Lean R (flip)	November 6, 2012
New York Times	Lean R (flip)	November 6, 2012
Washington Post	Tossup	November 6, 2012
RealClearPolitics	Tossup	November 6, 2012
Sabato's Crystal Ball	Likely R (flip)	November 5, 2012
FiveThirtyEight	Lean R (flip)	November 6, 2012

=== Results ===
2012 United States presidential election in North Carolina
Party	Candidate	Running mate	Votes	Percentage	Electoral votes
Republican	Mitt Romney	Paul Ryan	2,270,395	50.39%	15
Democratic	Barack Obama (incumbent)	Joe Biden (incumbent)	2,178,391	48.35%	0
Libertarian	Gary Johnson	Jim Gray	44,515	0.99%	0
Others (write-in)			12,071	0.27%	0
Totals			4,505,372	100.00%	15
Voter turnout (registered voters)					67.74%

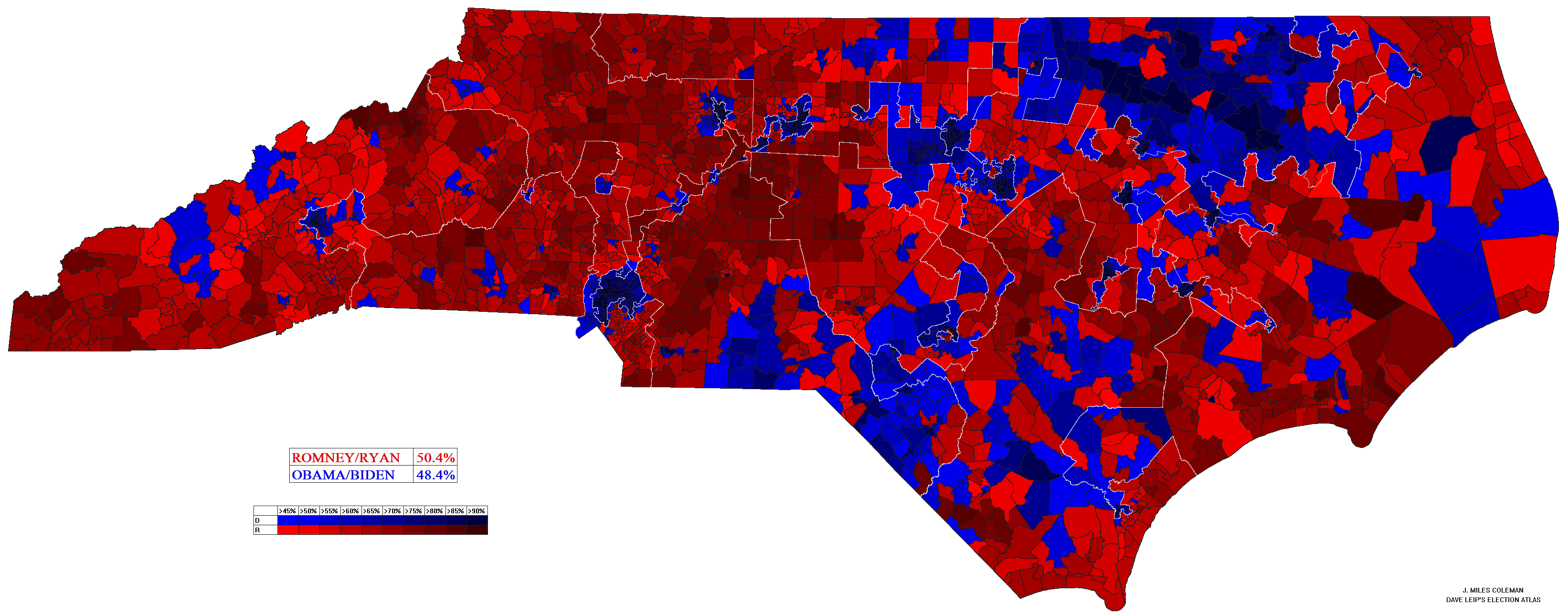
North Carolina 2012 presidential election by precinct

==== By county ====
County	Mitt Romney Republican		Barack Obama Democratic		Various candidates Other parties		Margin		Total
County	#	%	#	%	#	%	#	%	Total
Alamance	38,170	56.32%	28,875	42.60%	731	1.08%	9,295	13.72%	67,776
Alexander	12,253	71.25%	4,611	26.81%	332	1.94%	7,642	44.44%	17,196
Alleghany	3,390	66.90%	1,583	31.24%	94	1.86%	1,807	35.66%	5,067
Anson	4,166	37.01%	7,019	62.36%	71	0.63%	−2,853	−25.35%	11,256
Ashe	8,242	65.36%	4,116	32.64%	252	2.00%	4,126	32.72%	12,610
Avery	5,766	74.31%	1,882	24.26%	111	1.43%	3,884	50.05%	7,759
Beaufort	13,977	59.17%	9,435	39.94%	208	0.89%	4,542	19.23%	23,620
Bertie	3,387	33.46%	6,695	66.14%	41	0.40%	−3,308	−32.68%	10,123
Bladen	7,748	48.56%	8,062	50.52%	147	0.92%	−314	−1.96%	15,957
Brunswick	34,743	60.57%	22,038	38.42%	581	1.01%	12,705	22.15%	57,362
Buncombe	54,701	42.84%	70,625	55.31%	2,370	1.85%	−15,924	−12.47%	127,696
Burke	22,267	60.93%	13,701	37.49%	576	1.58%	8,566	23.44%	36,544
Cabarrus	49,557	59.30%	32,849	39.31%	1,160	1.39%	16,708	19.99%	83,566
Caldwell	23,229	66.88%	10,898	31.38%	605	1.74%	12,331	35.50%	34,732
Camden	3,109	66.09%	1,508	32.06%	87	1.85%	1,601	34.03%	4,704
Carteret	24,775	69.76%	10,301	29.00%	441	1.24%	14,474	40.76%	35,517
Caswell	5,594	50.67%	5,348	48.45%	97	0.88%	246	2.22%	11,039
Catawba	44,538	63.99%	24,069	34.58%	994	1.43%	20,469	29.41%	69,601
Chatham	16,665	47.03%	18,361	51.82%	408	1.15%	−1,696	−4.79%	35,434
Cherokee	9,278	72.11%	3,378	26.25%	211	1.64%	5,900	45.86%	12,867
Chowan	3,891	51.85%	3,556	47.38%	58	0.77%	335	4.47%	7,505
Clay	3,973	70.42%	1,579	27.99%	90	1.59%	2,394	42.43%	5,642
Cleveland	25,793	59.51%	17,062	39.37%	485	1.12%	8,731	20.14%	43,340
Columbus	12,941	53.38%	11,050	45.58%	252	1.04%	1,891	7.80%	24,243
Craven	26,928	58.32%	18,763	40.64%	479	1.04%	8,165	17.68%	46,170
Cumberland	50,666	39.69%	75,792	59.38%	1,183	0.93%	−25,126	−19.69%	127,641
Currituck	7,496	66.31%	3,562	31.51%	246	2.18%	3,934	34.80%	11,304
Dare	10,248	57.02%	7,393	41.13%	333	1.85%	2,855	15.89%	17,974
Davidson	49,383	69.62%	20,624	29.07%	928	1.31%	28,759	40.55%	70,935
Davie	14,687	71.05%	5,735	27.75%	248	1.20%	8,952	43.30%	20,670
Duplin	11,416	55.44%	9,033	43.87%	143	0.69%	2,383	11.57%	20,592
Durham	33,769	23.01%	111,224	75.80%	1,742	1.19%	−77,455	−52.79%	146,735
Edgecombe	8,546	31.68%	18,310	67.89%	116	0.43%	−9,764	−36.21%	26,972
Forsyth	79,768	45.83%	92,323	53.04%	1,978	1.13%	−12,555	−7.21%	174,069
Franklin	14,603	51.44%	13,436	47.33%	350	1.23%	1,167	4.11%	28,389
Gaston	56,138	62.04%	33,171	36.66%	1,174	1.30%	22,967	25.38%	90,483
Gates	2,564	47.52%	2,786	51.63%	46	0.85%	−222	−4.11%	5,396
Graham	2,750	69.67%	1,119	28.35%	78	1.98%	1,631	41.32%	3,947
Granville	12,405	47.21%	13,598	51.75%	272	1.04%	−1,193	−4.54%	26,275
Greene	4,411	53.56%	3,778	45.87%	47	0.57%	633	7.69%	8,236
Guilford	104,789	41.28%	146,365	57.66%	2,698	1.06%	−41,576	−16.38%	253,852
Halifax	8,763	33.60%	17,176	65.86%	140	0.54%	−8,413	−32.26%	26,079
Harnett	25,565	58.89%	17,331	39.92%	519	1.19%	8,234	18.97%	43,415
Haywood	15,633	55.88%	11,833	42.30%	508	1.82%	3,800	13.58%	27,974
Henderson	32,994	62.98%	18,642	35.58%	756	1.44%	14,352	27.40%	52,392
Hertford	3,007	27.54%	7,843	71.84%	68	0.62%	−4,836	−44.30%	10,918
Hoke	6,819	39.90%	10,076	58.96%	194	1.14%	−3,257	−19.06%	17,089
Hyde	1,193	50.06%	1,163	48.80%	27	1.14%	30	1.26%	2,383
Iredell	49,299	64.56%	26,076	34.15%	990	1.29%	23,223	30.41%	76,365
Jackson	8,254	49.42%	8,095	48.47%	352	2.11%	159	0.95%	16,701
Johnston	48,427	63.15%	27,290	35.58%	974	1.27%	21,137	27.57%	76,691
Jones	2,837	54.24%	2,352	44.97%	41	0.79%	485	9.27%	5,230
Lee	13,158	54.28%	10,801	44.56%	280	1.16%	2,357	9.72%	24,239
Lenoir	13,980	49.78%	13,948	49.66%	158	0.56%	32	0.12%	28,086
Lincoln	25,267	68.71%	11,024	29.98%	484	1.31%	14,243	38.73%	36,775
Macon	10,835	64.26%	5,712	33.88%	314	1.86%	5,123	30.38%	16,861
Madison	5,404	53.44%	4,484	44.34%	225	2.22%	920	9.10%	10,113
Martin	5,995	47.38%	6,583	52.03%	74	0.59%	−588	−4.65%	12,652
McDowell	11,775	65.06%	6,031	33.32%	293	1.62%	5,744	31.74%	18,099
Mecklenburg	171,668	38.24%	272,262	60.65%	4,970	1.11%	−100,594	−22.41%	448,900
Mitchell	5,806	74.77%	1,838	23.67%	121	1.56%	3,968	51.10%	7,765
Montgomery	6,404	57.02%	4,706	41.90%	121	1.08%	1,698	15.12%	11,231
Moore	29,495	63.55%	16,505	35.56%	415	0.89%	12,990	27.99%	46,415
Nash	23,842	49.17%	24,313	50.14%	337	0.69%	−471	−0.97%	48,492
New Hanover	53,385	51.52%	48,668	46.96%	1,575	1.52%	4,717	4.56%	103,628
Northampton	3,483	32.38%	7,232	67.24%	41	0.38%	−3,749	−34.86%	10,756
Onslow	32,243	62.69%	18,490	35.95%	702	1.36%	13,753	26.74%	51,435
Orange	21,539	28.06%	53,901	70.22%	1,317	1.72%	−32,362	−42.16%	76,757
Pamlico	4,051	59.91%	2,647	39.15%	64	0.94%	1,404	20.76%	6,762
Pasquotank	7,633	42.15%	10,282	56.78%	192	1.07%	−2,649	−14.63%	18,107
Pender	14,617	59.60%	9,632	39.27%	278	1.13%	4,985	20.33%	24,527
Perquimans	3,822	57.46%	2,759	41.48%	71	1.06%	1,063	15.98%	6,652
Person	10,496	54.94%	8,418	44.06%	192	1.00%	2,078	10.88%	19,106
Pitt	36,214	45.92%	41,843	53.06%	799	1.02%	−5,629	−7.14%	78,856
Polk	6,236	60.03%	4,013	38.63%	140	1.34%	2,223	21.40%	10,389
Randolph	45,160	74.38%	14,773	24.33%	782	1.29%	30,387	50.05%	60,715
Richmond	9,332	48.06%	9,904	51.01%	181	0.93%	−572	−2.95%	19,417
Robeson	17,510	40.77%	24,988	58.18%	448	1.05%	−7,478	−17.41%	42,946
Rockingham	25,227	60.04%	16,351	38.91%	442	1.05%	8,876	21.13%	42,020
Rowan	38,775	62.23%	22,650	36.35%	887	1.42%	16,125	25.88%	62,312
Rutherford	18,954	66.04%	9,374	32.66%	374	1.30%	9,580	33.38%	28,702
Sampson	14,422	55.10%	11,566	44.19%	186	0.71%	2,856	10.91%	26,174
Scotland	5,831	41.19%	8,215	58.03%	110	0.78%	−2,384	−16.84%	14,156
Stanly	19,904	69.31%	8,431	29.36%	382	1.33%	11,473	39.95%	28,717
Stokes	15,237	70.48%	6,018	27.84%	364	1.68%	9,219	42.64%	21,619
Surry	19,923	67.60%	9,112	30.92%	435	1.48%	10,811	36.68%	29,470
Swain	2,976	51.96%	2,618	45.71%	134	2.33%	358	6.25%	5,728
Transylvania	9,634	57.47%	6,826	40.72%	303	1.81%	2,808	16.75%	16,763
Tyrrell	930	52.16%	837	46.94%	16	0.90%	93	5.22%	1,783
Union	61,107	64.51%	32,473	34.28%	1,148	1.21%	28,634	30.23%	94,728
Vance	7,429	35.62%	13,323	63.89%	102	0.49%	−5,894	−28.27%	20,854
Wake	211,596	43.50%	267,262	54.94%	7,569	1.56%	−55,666	−11.44%	486,427
Warren	3,140	30.90%	6,978	68.67%	44	0.43%	−3,838	−37.77%	10,162
Washington	2,622	40.34%	3,833	58.98%	44	0.68%	−1,211	−18.64%	6,499
Watauga	13,861	50.09%	13,002	46.98%	811	2.93%	859	3.11%	27,674
Wayne	27,641	53.83%	23,314	45.40%	397	0.77%	4,327	8.43%	51,352
Wilkes	20,515	70.39%	8,148	27.96%	482	1.65%	12,367	42.43%	29,145
Wilson	17,954	45.91%	20,875	53.38%	280	0.71%	−2,921	−7.47%	39,109
Yadkin	12,578	74.81%	3,957	23.54%	278	1.65%	8,621	51.27%	16,813
Yancey	5,278	55.85%	3,981	42.12%	192	2.03%	1,297	13.73%	9,451
Totals	2,270,395	50.39%	2,178,391	48.35%	56,586	1.26%	92,004	2.04%	4,505,372

Counties that flipped from Democratic to Republican

- Caswell (largest town: Yanceyville)
- Hyde (largest community: Ocracoke)
- Jackson (largest town: Cullowhee)
- Watauga (largest town: Boone)

Counties that flipped from Republican to Democratic

- Nash (largest city: Rocky Mount)

==== By congressional district ====
Romney won ten of the state's 13 congressional districts, including one that elected a Democrat.

District	Romney	Obama	Representative
1st	28%	72%	G. K. Butterfield
2nd	57%	42%	Renee Ellmers
3rd	58%	41%	Walter B. Jones
4th	27%	71%	David Price
5th	59%	40%	Virginia Foxx
6th	58%	41%	Howard Coble
7th	59%	40%	Mike McIntyre
8th	58%	41%	Larry Kissell
8th	58%	41%	Richard Hudson
9th	56%	43%	Sue Myrick
9th	56%	43%	Robert Pittenger
10th	58%	41%	Patrick McHenry
11th	61%	38%	Heath Shuler
11th	61%	38%	Mark Meadows
12th	21%	79%	Mel Watt
13th	55%	44%	Brad Miller
13th	55%	44%	George Holding

== See also ==
- 2012 Republican Party presidential debates and forums
- 2012 Republican Party presidential primaries
- Results of the 2012 Republican Party presidential primaries
- North Carolina Republican Party
