= Edwin Frederick Waff =

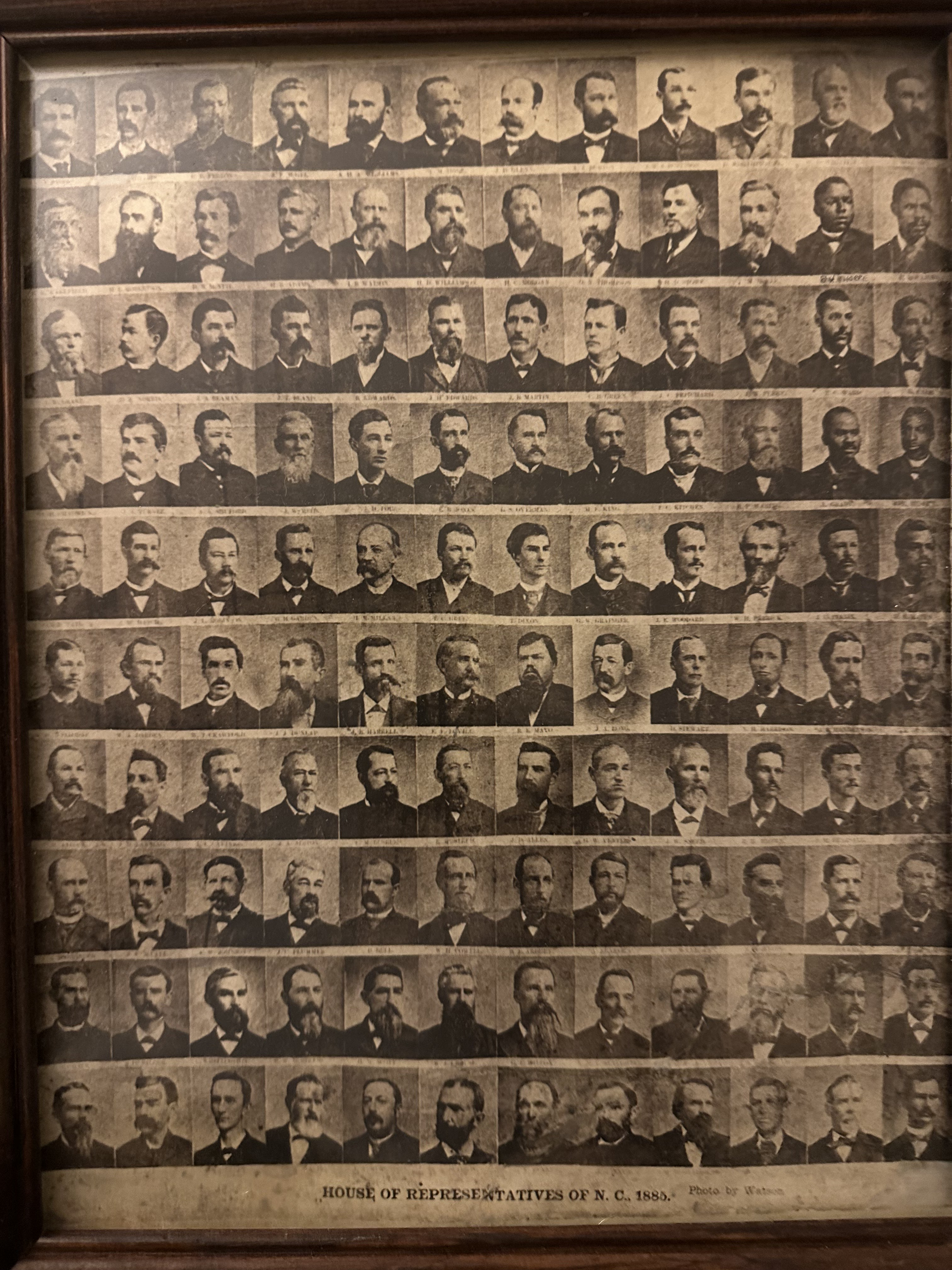
Members of the North Carolina House of Representatives in 1885

Edwin Frederick Waff was a state legislator in North Carolina. He represented Chowan County, North Carolina in the North Carolina House of Representatives in 1885. He was preceded in office by E. H. Sutton and succeeded by Elihu Copeland.
