= Rockyhock, North Carolina =

Rocky Hock, North Carolina
- Unincorporated community
- Location within the state of North Carolina
- Coordinates: 36°10′52″N 76°41′34″W
- Country: United States
- State: North Carolina
- County: Chowan
- Elevation: 26 ft (7.9 m)
- Time zone: UTC-5 (Eastern (EST))
  - Summer (DST): UTC-4 (EDT)
- GNIS feature ID: 1022379

Rocky Hock is an unincorporated community in Chowan County, North Carolina, United States. Its elevation is 26 feet (8 m). Faced with three different possible official names for the community, the Board on Geographic Names officially proclaimed it Rockyhock in 1982.
