= 2008 United States presidential election in North Carolina =

- November 4, 2008
- Turnout: 69.53% (▲5.27 pp)

Nominee	Barack Obama	John McCain
Party	Democratic	Republican
Home state	Illinois	Arizona
Running mate	Joe Biden	Sarah Palin
Electoral vote	15	0
Popular vote	2,142,651	2,128,474
Percentage	49.70%	49.38%

Obama
40–50%
50–60%
60–70%
70–80%
80–90%
90–100%
McCain
40–50%
50–60%
60–70%
70–80%
80–90%
90–100%
Tie
President before election
George W. Bush
Republican
Elected President
Barack Obama
Democratic

The 2008 United States presidential election in North Carolina was part of the national event on November 4, 2008, throughout all 50 states and the District of Columbia. In North Carolina, voters chose 15 representatives, or electors, to the Electoral College, who voted for president and vice president.

North Carolina was narrowly won by Democratic nominee Barack Obama with a 0.32% margin of victory, making the state 6.88% more Republican than the nation, as he won the national popular vote by 7.2%. Prior to the election, most news organizations considered the state as a toss-up or a swing state. Throughout the general election, the state was heavily targeted by both campaigns. A high turnout by African American voters, bolstered by overwhelming support from younger voters were the major factors that helped deliver North Carolina's 15 electoral votes to Obama, making him the first and as of 2024 only Democratic presidential nominee to carry the state since 1976, when Jimmy Carter prevailed. The state would vote Republican by less than 5% in the next four elections while still being considered a swing state.

North Carolina continues to lean Republican relative to the nation. This is the only time North Carolina has voted differently from South Carolina since 1964, despite South Carolina being considered a safe red state. To date, 2008 was also the only presidential race since 1992 where North Carolina’s victory margin was less than 1%.

As of the 2024 presidential race, this is the last time Jackson, Hyde, and Caswell counties would vote Democratic, the last time Nash County voted for the losing candidate nationwide, and was the last time the state voted for the winner of the national popular vote until 2024.

== Primaries ==
- 2008 North Carolina Democratic primary
- 2008 North Carolina Republican primary

== Campaign ==
=== Predictions ===
A total of 16 news organizations made state-by-state predictions of the election. Here are their last predictions before election day:

Source	Ranking
D.C. Political Report	Likely R
Cook Political Report	Toss-up
The Takeaway	Toss-up
Electoral-vote.com	Lean D (flip)
Washington Post	Toss-up
Politico	Lean R
RealClearPolitics	Toss-up
FiveThirtyEight	Toss-up
CQ Politics	Toss-up
The New York Times	Toss-up
CNN	Toss-up
NPR	Lean R
MSNBC	Toss-up
Fox News	Toss-up
Associated Press	Toss-up
Rasmussen Reports	Toss-up

=== Polling ===
Early on, McCain won almost every single pre-election poll. However, on September 23, Rasmussen Reports showed Obama leading in a poll for the first time. He won the poll 49% to 47%. After that, polls showed the state being a complete toss-up, as both McCain and Obama were winning many polls and no candidate was taking a consistent lead in the state. Commentators attributed the drastic turnaround in the state to the influence of voter unhappiness about the financial crisis and the effectiveness of heavy advertising and organizing to get out the vote by the Obama campaign in the fall election. The final 3 polls found a tie with both candidate at 49%, which was accurate compared to the results.

=== Fundraising ===
John McCain raised a total of $2,888,922 in the state. Barack Obama raised $8,569,866.

=== Advertising and visits ===
Obama and his interest groups spent $15,178,674. McCain and his interest groups spent $7,137,289. The Democratic ticket visited the state 12 times. The Republican ticket visited the state 8 times.

== Analysis ==
The winner was not certain even several days after the election, as thousands of provisional and absentee ballots were still being counted. However, when it became evident that McCain would need to win an improbable majority of these votes to overcome Obama's election night lead, the major news networks finally called the state's 15 electoral votes for Obama. North Carolina was the second-closest state in 2008; only in Missouri was the race closer. Situated in the increasingly Republican-dominated South, North Carolina was an anomaly by 2008. While still Democratic-leaning at the local and state level, the last Democratic presidential nominee to carry North Carolina up to that point was Jimmy Carter in 1976. Not even the Southern moderate Bill Clinton of Arkansas carried it in either of his elections (though he came very close in 1992), and in 2004, Democratic nominee John Kerry lost North Carolina by a 12-point margin despite his running mate John Edwards being a sitting Senator from the state.

Obama decided early on to campaign aggressively in the state. It paid off quickly; most polls from spring onward showed the race within single digits of difference between the candidates. He also dramatically outspent McCain in the state and had an extensive grassroots campaign of organizing to get out the vote. This was also one of the closest statewide contests of 2008, as Obama captured North Carolina just by 0.32% of the vote - a margin of only 14,177 votes out of 4.2 million statewide. Only in Missouri was the race closer, where McCain nipped Obama by less than 4,000 votes, a margin of 0.14%.

Republicans have traditionally done well in the western part of North Carolina which is a part of Appalachia, while Democrats are stronger in the urbanized east. When a Democrat wins in North Carolina, almost everything from Charlotte eastward is usually coated blue. Even when Democrats lose, they often still retain a number of counties in the industrial southeast (alongside Fayetteville), the African-American northeast, the fast-growing I-85 corridor in the Piedmont, and sometimes the western Appalachian region next to Tennessee. For example, a map of Bill Clinton's narrow 1992 loss in North Carolina shows him narrowly winning all these regions.

Obama did not take the traditional Democratic path to victory. Instead, his main margins came from the cities, where he did particularly well throughout the country. While Obama won only 33 of North Carolina's 100 counties, these counties contained more than half of the state's population. Obama's victory margin came largely by running up huge majorities in the I-85 corridor, a developing megalopolis which is home to more than two-thirds of the state's population and casts almost 70% of the state's vote. The state's five largest counties--Mecklenburg (home to Charlotte) Wake (home to Raleigh), Guilford (home to Greensboro), Forsyth (home to Winston-Salem) and Durham (home to Durham)--are all located in this area, and Obama swept them all by 11 percentage points or more. He particularly attracted highly affluent and educated migrants from the Northeast, who traditionally tend to vote Democratic; as well as African Americans, Hispanics (an increasing population in the state), and college students, voting blocs who had overwhelmingly supported him during the course of the 2008 Democratic presidential primary. In 1992, Bill Clinton was able to win only Durham County by this margin; he narrowly lost Forsyth and Mecklenburg (the latter was where Obama had his biggest margin in the state). Ultimately, Obama's combined margin of 350,000 votes in these counties was too much for McCain to overcome.

McCain did well in the Charlotte suburbs, Appalachian foothills, and mountain country; he carried all but four counties west of Winston-Salem. Aside from the I-85 corridor, Obama's results were mediocre in the traditional Democratic base. He lost badly in Appalachia, mirroring the difficulties he had throughout this region. Obama won only three counties in this region, one of which was Buncombe County, home to Asheville, the largest city in the region and a destination for retirees from the North. In the Fayetteville area, he did as well as Al Gore (who had lost North Carolina by double digits).

During the same election, Democrats picked up a seat in the U.S. House of Representatives in North Carolina's 8th congressional district, where incumbent Republican Robin Hayes was ousted by Democrat Larry Kissell, a high school social studies teacher who almost toppled Hayes in 2006. Kissell received 55.38% of the vote while Hayes took in 44.62%, a 10.76-percent difference. Democrats held onto the Governor's Mansion; term-limited incumbent Democratic Governor Mike Easley was ineligible to seek a third term but Lieutenant Governor Beverly Perdue defeated Republican Pat McCrory, the incumbent mayor of Charlotte. Perdue received 50.23% of the vote while McCrory took 46.90%, with the remaining 2.86% going to Libertarian Michael Munger.

In a highly targeted U.S. Senate race, Democratic State Senator Kay Hagan defeated incumbent Republican Elizabeth Dole by a wider-than-anticipated margin - by 8.47 points. Hagan received 52.65% while Dole took 44.18%. The race received widespread attention after the National Republican Senatorial Committee (NRSC) ran its notorious "Godless" ad that accused Hagan, a Sunday school teacher, of accepting money from atheists and accused her of being an atheist. The adverse reaction resulting from the ad was considered a major factor contributing to Dole's defeat. At the state level, Democrats increased their gains in the North Carolina General Assembly, picking up five seats in the North Carolina House of Representatives and one seat in the North Carolina Senate.

According to exit polls, more than 95% of African American voters cast ballots for Obama. This played a critical role in North Carolina, as 95% of the state's registered African-American voters turned out, with Obama carrying an unprecedented 100% of African-American women, as well as younger African-Americans aged 18 to 29, according to exit polling. Comparatively, the overall turnout of voters statewide was 69%.

== Results ==
2008 United States presidential election in North Carolina
Party	Candidate	Running mate	Votes	Percentage	Electoral votes
Democratic	Barack Obama	Joe Biden	2,142,651	49.70%	15
Republican	John McCain	Sarah Palin	2,128,474	49.38%	0
Libertarian	Bob Barr	Wayne Allyn Root	25,722	0.60%	0
Write-ins	Write-ins		12,292	0.29%	0
Independent	Ralph Nader (write-in)	Matt Gonzalez	1,454	0.03%	0
Green	Cynthia McKinney (write-in)	Rosa Clemente	158	0.00%	0
Others	Others		38	0.00%	0
Totals			4,310,789	100.00%	15
Voter turnout (voting-age population)					63.0%

=== By county ===
County	Barack Obama Democratic		John McCain Republican		Various candidates Other parties		Margin		Total
County	#	%	#	%	#	%	#	%	Total
Alamance	28,918	44.94%	34,859	54.17%	576	0.89%	−5,941	−9.23%	64,353
Alexander	5,167	29.95%	11,790	68.33%	297	1.72%	−6,623	−38.38%	17,254
Alleghany	2,021	38.40%	3,124	59.36%	118	2.24%	−1,103	−20.96%	5,263
Anson	6,456	60.15%	4,207	39.20%	70	0.65%	2,249	20.95%	10,733
Ashe	4,872	37.28%	7,916	60.57%	281	2.15%	−3,044	−23.29%	13,069
Avery	2,178	27.42%	5,681	71.52%	84	1.06%	−3,503	−44.10%	7,943
Beaufort	9,454	41.09%	13,460	58.50%	96	0.41%	−4,006	−17.41%	23,010
Bertie	6,365	65.20%	3,376	34.58%	22	0.22%	2,989	30.62%	9,763
Bladen	7,853	50.73%	7,532	48.66%	95	0.61%	321	2.07%	15,480
Brunswick	21,331	40.55%	30,753	58.46%	524	0.99%	−9,422	−17.91%	52,608
Buncombe	69,716	56.32%	52,494	42.40%	1,585	1.28%	17,222	13.92%	123,795
Burke	14,901	39.80%	22,102	59.03%	440	1.17%	−7,201	−19.23%	37,443
Cabarrus	31,546	40.45%	45,924	58.88%	524	0.67%	−14,378	−18.43%	77,994
Caldwell	12,081	34.36%	22,526	64.08%	548	1.56%	−10,445	−29.72%	35,155
Camden	1,597	33.13%	3,140	65.13%	84	1.74%	−1,543	−32.00%	4,821
Carteret	11,130	32.17%	23,131	66.86%	336	0.97%	−12,001	−34.69%	34,597
Caswell	5,545	51.05%	5,208	47.95%	109	1.00%	337	3.10%	10,862
Catawba	25,656	36.94%	42,993	61.90%	802	1.16%	−17,337	−24.96%	69,451
Chatham	17,862	54.32%	14,668	44.61%	350	1.07%	3,194	9.71%	32,880
Cherokee	3,785	30.07%	8,643	68.67%	158	1.26%	−4,858	−38.60%	12,586
Chowan	3,688	49.09%	3,773	50.23%	51	0.68%	−85	−1.14%	7,512
Clay	1,734	31.28%	3,707	66.88%	102	1.82%	−1,973	−35.60%	5,543
Cleveland	17,363	39.61%	26,078	59.49%	394	0.90%	−8,715	−19.88%	43,835
Columbus	11,076	45.61%	12,994	53.51%	212	0.88%	−1,918	−7.90%	24,282
Craven	19,352	43.39%	24,901	55.83%	345	0.78%	−5,549	−12.44%	44,598
Cumberland	74,693	58.55%	52,151	40.88%	731	0.57%	22,542	17.67%	127,575
Currituck	3,737	33.66%	7,234	65.16%	131	1.18%	−3,497	−31.50%	11,102
Dare	8,074	44.74%	9,745	53.99%	229	1.27%	−1,671	−9.25%	18,048
Davidson	22,433	32.71%	45,419	66.23%	729	1.06%	−22,986	−33.52%	68,581
Davie	6,178	30.33%	13,981	68.64%	209	1.03%	−7,803	−38.31%	20,368
Duplin	8,958	45.01%	10,834	54.43%	112	0.56%	−1,876	−9.42%	19,904
Durham	103,456	75.57%	32,353	23.63%	1,088	0.80%	71,103	51.94%	136,897
Edgecombe	17,403	67.12%	8,445	32.57%	82	0.31%	8,958	34.55%	25,930
Forsyth	91,085	54.83%	73,674	44.35%	1,374	0.82%	17,411	10.48%	166,133
Franklin	13,085	49.12%	13,273	49.83%	281	1.05%	−188	−0.71%	26,639
Gaston	31,384	37.18%	52,507	62.21%	511	0.61%	−21,123	−25.03%	84,402
Gates	2,830	52.21%	2,547	46.99%	43	0.80%	283	5.22%	5,420
Graham	1,265	30.33%	2,824	67.71%	82	1.96%	−1,559	−37.38%	4,171
Granville	13,074	52.88%	11,447	46.30%	204	0.82%	1,627	6.58%	24,725
Greene	3,796	46.85%	4,272	52.72%	35	0.43%	−476	−5.87%	8,103
Guilford	142,101	58.78%	97,718	40.42%	1,952	0.80%	44,383	18.36%	241,771
Halifax	16,047	63.96%	8,961	35.71%	83	0.33%	7,086	28.25%	25,091
Harnett	16,785	41.24%	23,579	57.93%	341	0.83%	−6,794	−16.69%	40,705
Haywood	12,730	45.36%	14,910	53.12%	427	1.52%	−2,180	−7.76%	28,067
Henderson	20,082	38.91%	30,930	59.93%	602	1.16%	−10,848	−21.02%	51,614
Hertford	7,513	70.54%	3,089	29.00%	48	0.46%	4,424	41.54%	10,650
Hoke	9,227	59.05%	6,293	40.27%	107	0.68%	2,934	18.78%	15,627
Hyde	1,241	50.26%	1,212	49.09%	16	0.65%	29	1.17%	2,469
Iredell	27,318	37.34%	45,148	61.71%	696	0.95%	−17,830	−24.37%	73,162
Jackson	8,766	51.97%	7,854	46.57%	246	1.46%	912	5.40%	16,866
Johnston	26,795	37.73%	43,622	61.42%	600	0.85%	−16,827	−23.69%	71,017
Jones	2,378	45.49%	2,817	53.89%	32	0.62%	−439	−8.40%	5,227
Lee	10,784	45.33%	12,775	53.70%	229	0.97%	−1,991	−8.37%	23,788
Lenoir	13,378	49.74%	13,401	49.82%	118	0.44%	−23	−0.08%	26,897
Lincoln	11,713	32.72%	23,631	66.01%	454	1.27%	−11,918	−33.29%	35,798
Macon	6,620	38.40%	10,317	59.85%	301	1.75%	−3,697	−21.45%	17,238
Madison	5,026	48.42%	5,192	50.02%	161	1.56%	−166	−1.60%	10,379
Martin	6,539	52.14%	5,957	47.50%	45	0.36%	582	4.64%	12,541
McDowell	6,571	35.74%	11,534	62.73%	281	1.53%	−4,963	−26.99%	18,386
Mecklenburg	253,958	61.82%	153,848	37.45%	3,011	0.73%	100,110	24.37%	410,817
Mitchell	2,238	28.52%	5,499	70.09%	109	1.39%	−3,261	−41.57%	7,846
Montgomery	4,926	43.94%	6,155	54.91%	129	1.15%	−1,229	−10.97%	11,210
Moore	17,624	38.88%	27,314	60.26%	390	0.86%	−9,690	−21.38%	45,328
Nash	23,099	49.02%	23,728	50.36%	291	0.62%	−629	−1.34%	47,118
New Hanover	49,145	48.82%	50,544	50.21%	976	0.97%	−1,399	−1.39%	100,665
Northampton	6,903	65.01%	3,671	34.57%	44	0.42%	3,232	30.44%	10,618
Onslow	19,499	38.84%	30,278	60.31%	426	0.85%	−10,779	−21.47%	50,203
Orange	53,806	71.83%	20,266	27.05%	838	1.12%	33,540	44.78%	74,910
Pamlico	2,838	42.28%	3,823	56.96%	51	0.76%	−985	−14.68%	6,712
Pasquotank	10,272	56.50%	7,778	42.78%	130	0.72%	2,494	13.72%	18,180
Pender	9,907	41.72%	13,618	57.34%	224	0.94%	−3,711	−15.62%	23,749
Perquimans	2,772	42.64%	3,678	56.58%	51	0.78%	−906	−13.94%	6,501
Person	8,446	45.33%	10,030	53.83%	156	0.84%	−1,584	−8.50%	18,632
Pitt	40,501	54.08%	33,927	45.31%	456	0.61%	6,574	8.77%	74,884
Polk	4,396	41.62%	5,990	56.71%	176	1.67%	−1,594	−15.09%	10,562
Randolph	16,414	28.23%	40,998	70.51%	735	1.26%	−24,584	−42.28%	58,147
Richmond	9,713	50.26%	9,424	48.76%	190	0.98%	289	1.50%	19,327
Robeson	23,058	56.47%	17,433	42.69%	343	0.84%	5,625	13.78%	40,834
Rockingham	17,255	41.47%	23,899	57.43%	458	1.10%	−6,644	−15.96%	41,612
Rowan	23,391	38.00%	37,451	60.84%	718	1.16%	−14,060	−22.84%	61,560
Rutherford	9,641	33.57%	18,769	65.35%	310	1.08%	−9,128	−31.78%	28,720
Sampson	11,836	45.46%	14,038	53.91%	164	0.63%	−2,202	−8.45%	26,038
Scotland	8,151	57.33%	6,005	42.24%	61	0.43%	2,146	15.09%	14,217
Stanly	8,878	31.14%	19,329	67.81%	299	1.05%	−10,451	−36.67%	28,506
Stokes	6,875	31.62%	14,488	66.63%	380	1.75%	−7,613	−35.01%	21,743
Surry	10,475	35.48%	18,730	63.44%	320	1.08%	−8,255	−27.96%	29,525
Swain	2,806	48.40%	2,900	50.02%	92	1.58%	−94	−1.62%	5,798
Transylvania	7,275	43.02%	9,401	55.60%	233	1.38%	−2,126	−12.58%	16,909
Tyrrell	933	48.85%	960	50.26%	17	0.99%	−27	−1.41%	1,910
Union	31,189	36.23%	54,123	62.87%	777	0.90%	−22,934	−26.64%	86,089
Vance	13,166	63.08%	7,606	36.44%	99	0.48%	5,560	26.64%	20,871
Wake	250,891	56.73%	187,001	42.28%	4,353	0.99%	63,890	14.45%	442,245
Warren	7,086	69.50%	3,063	30.04%	46	0.46%	4,023	39.46%	10,195
Washington	3,748	58.07%	2,670	41.37%	36	0.54%	1,078	16.70%	6,454
Watauga	14,558	51.31%	13,344	47.03%	470	1.66%	1,214	4.28%	28,372
Wayne	22,671	45.45%	26,952	54.03%	259	0.52%	−4,281	−8.58%	49,882
Wilkes	8,934	30.06%	20,288	68.25%	502	1.69%	−11,354	−38.19%	29,724
Wilson	19,652	52.84%	17,375	46.72%	164	0.44%	2,277	6.12%	37,191
Yadkin	4,527	26.40%	12,409	72.37%	211	1.23%	−7,882	−45.97%	17,147
Yancey	4,486	46.17%	5,045	51.92%	186	1.91%	−559	−5.75%	9,717
Totals	2,142,651	49.70%	2,128,474	49.38%	39,664	0.92%	14,177	0.32%	4,310,789

Counties that flipped from Republican to Democratic

- Bladen (largest town: Elizabethtown)
- Buncombe (largest town: Asheville)
- Caswell (largest town: Yanceyville)
- Cumberland (largest town: Fayetteville)
- Forsyth (largest town: Winston-Salem)
- Granville (largest town: Oxford)
- Hyde (largest town: Swanquarter)
- Jackson (largest town: Sylva)
- Martin (largest town: Willianston)
- Pitt (largest town: Greenville)
- Wake (largest town: Raleigh)
- Watauga (largest town: Boone)
- Wilson (largest town: Wilson)

=== By congressional district ===
Despite Barack Obama winning North Carolina, John McCain carried 7 of the state's 13 congressional districts, including two districts represented by Democrats in the U.S. House of Representatives.

District	McCain	Obama	Representative
1st	37.11%	62.44%	G. K. Butterfield
2nd	47.29%	51.91%	Bob Etheridge
3rd	61.37%	37.83%	Walter B. Jones Jr.
4th	36.32%	62.70%	David Price
5th	60.83%	37.91%	Virginia Foxx
6th	62.76%	36.20%	Howard Coble
7th	52.35%	46.79%	Mike McIntyre
8th	46.68%	52.56%	Robin Hayes (110th Congress)
8th	46.68%	52.56%	Larry Kissell (111th Congress)
9th	54.46%	44.75%	Sue Myrick
10th	63.11%	35.74%	Patrick McHenry
11th	52.12%	46.50%	Heath Shuler
12th	28.93%	70.42%	Mel Watt
13th	40.38%	58.70%	Brad Miller

=== By region ===
Grand Division	Obama	McCain
East	48.89%	50.40%
Central	53.71%	45.39%
West	40.76%	57.99%

== Electors ==
Technically the voters of North Carolina cast their ballots for electors: representatives to the Electoral College. North Carolina is allocated 15 electors because it has 13 congressional districts and 2 senators. All candidates who appear on the ballot or qualify to receive write-in votes must submit a list of 15 electors, who pledge to vote for their candidate and their running mate. Whoever wins the majority of votes in the state is awarded all 15 electoral votes. Their chosen electors then vote for president and vice president. Although electors are pledged to their candidate and running mate, they are not obligated to vote for them. An elector who votes for someone other than their candidate is known as a faithless elector.

The electors of each state and the District of Columbia met on December 15, 2008, to cast their votes for president and vice president. The Electoral College itself never meets as one body. Instead the electors from each state and the District of Columbia met in their respective capitols.

The following were the members of the Electoral College from the state. All 15 were pledged to Barack Obama and Joe Biden:

1. Janice Cole
2. Louise Sewell
3. Virginia Tillett
4. Linda Gunter
5. Timothy Futrelle
6. Wayne Abraham
7. Armin Ancis
8. Wendy Wood
9. Michael Cognac
10. Dan DeHart
11. Harley Caldwell
12. Samuel Spencer
13. Patricia Hawkins
14. Sid Crawford
15. Kara Hollingsworth
