= Chowan Beach, North Carolina =

- Census-designated place
- Location within North Carolina Location within the United States
- Coordinates: 36°12′51″N 76°42′41″W
- Country: United States
- State: North Carolina
- County: Chowan

Area
  - Total: 0.20 sq mi (0.51 km^{2})
  - Land: 0.16 sq mi (0.41 km^{2})
  - Water: 0.039 sq mi (0.10 km^{2})
- Elevation: 30 ft (9.1 m)

Population (2020)
  - Total: 385
  - Density: 2,430.9/sq mi (938.59/km^{2})
- Time zone: UTC-5 (Eastern (EST))
  - Summer (DST): UTC-4 (EDT)
- ZIP Code: 27932 (Edenton)
- Area code: 252
- FIPS code: 37-12590
- GNIS feature ID: 2812786

Chowan Beach is an unincorporated community and census-designated place (CDP) in Chowan County, North Carolina, United States. It was first listed as a CDP in the 2020 census with a population of 385.

The community is in northern Chowan County, on the east bank of the tidal Chowan River. It is bordered to the north by Arrowhead Beach. Edenton, the county seat, is 13 miles (21 km) to the south-southeast.

== Demographics ==
=== 2020 census ===
Chowan Beach CDP, North Carolina – Racial and Ethnic Composition (NH = Non-Hispanic) Note: the US Census treats Hispanic/Latino as an ethnic category. This table excludes Latinos from the racial categories and assigns them to a separate category. Hispanics/Latinos may be of any race.
Race / Ethnicity	Pop 2020	% 2020
White alone (NH)	282	73.25%
Black or African American alone (NH)	40	10.39%
Native American or Alaska Native alone (NH)	3	0.78%
Asian alone (NH)	0	0.00%
Native Hawaiian or Pacific Islander alone (NH)	0	0.00%
Other race alone (NH)	0	0.00%
Mixed race or Multiracial (NH)	30	7.79%
Hispanic or Latino (any race)	30	7.79%
Total	385	100.00%
