= 1992 United States presidential election in North Carolina =

- November 3, 1992
- Turnout: 68.40% ▲6.21 pp
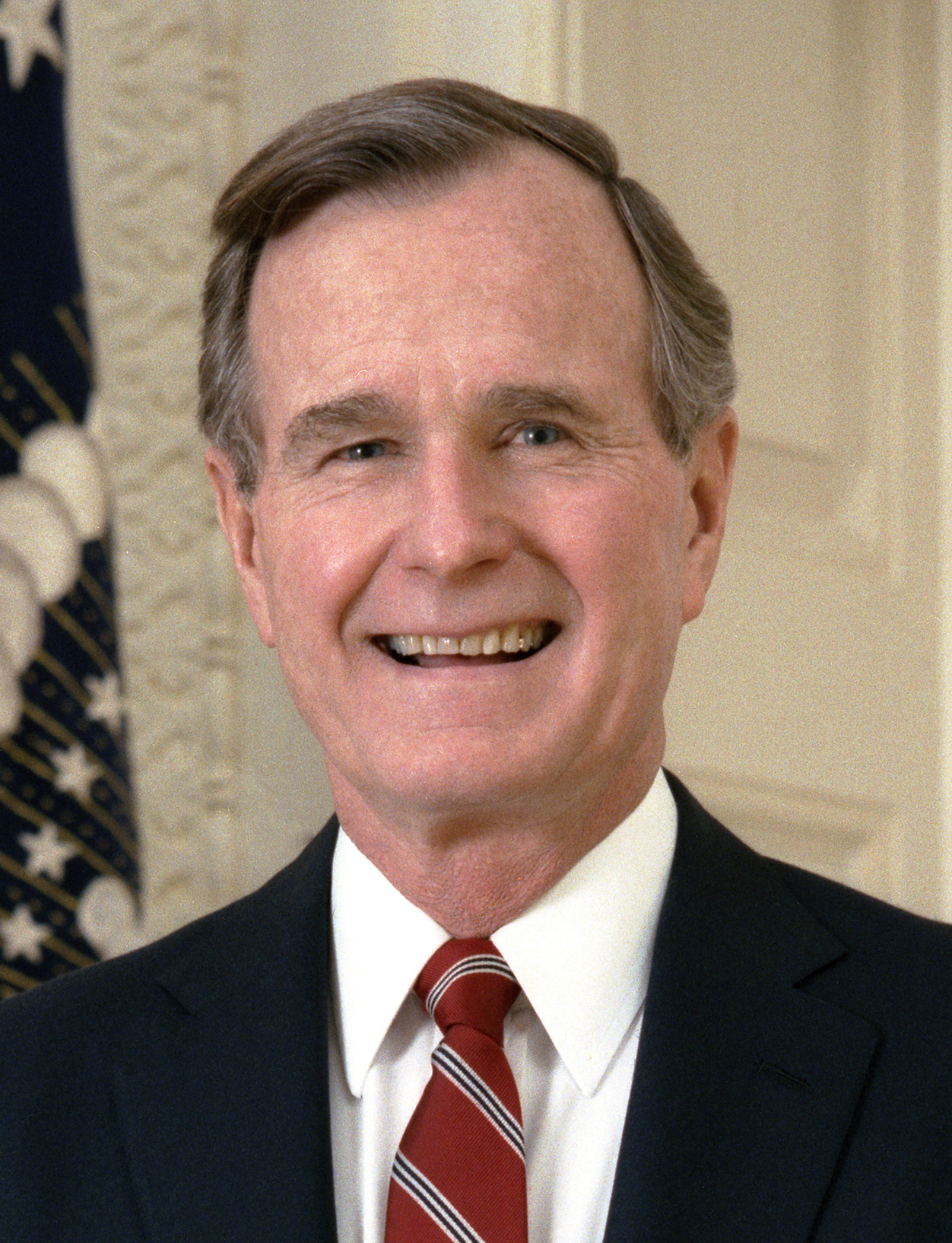

Nominee	George H. W. Bush	Bill Clinton	Ross Perot
Party	Republican	Democratic	Independent
Home state	Texas	Arkansas	Texas
Running mate	Dan Quayle	Al Gore	James Stockdale
Electoral vote	14	0	0
Popular vote	1,134,661	1,114,042	357,864
Percentage	43.44%	42.65%	13.70%

Bush
40–50%
50–60%
60–70%
Clinton
40–50%
50–60%
60–70%
President before election
George H. W. Bush
Republican
Elected President
Bill Clinton
Democratic

The 1992 United States presidential election in North Carolina took place on November 3, 1992, and was part of the 1992 United States presidential election. Voters chose 14 representatives, or electors to the Electoral College, who voted for president and vice president.

North Carolina was very narrowly won by incumbent Republican President George H. W. Bush of Texas over his Democratic challenger, Governor Bill Clinton of Arkansas. Bush took 43.44% of the vote to Clinton's 42.65%, a margin of 0.79%. North Carolina was the second-closest state in this election behind neighboring Georgia.

This was the first time since 1956 when North Carolina did not support the winning candidate. The state has also backed losing Republicans Bob Dole in 1996, Mitt Romney in 2012, and Donald Trump in 2020, although usually narrowly.

Billionaire businessman Ross Perot, running as an independent, finished in third, with 13.70% of the vote, a relatively strong showing for a third party candidate, and his second highest showing in the Southeast, behind only Florida.

== Background ==
With the exception of Jimmy Carter's victory in North Carolina in 1976, the state had voted for the Republican presidential nominee in every election since 1968. North Carolina held the third-highest number of electoral votes in the south behind Texas and Florida.

== General ==
Despite being from the South, Bill Clinton became the first Democrat to win the White House without carrying the state of North Carolina since James K. Polk in 1844, and Bush became the first ever Republican to carry the state while losing nationally. As of the 2016 presidential election, the 1992 election constitutes the last occasion the following counties have supported a Democratic presidential nominee: Alleghany, Brunswick, Greene, Pamlico, Pender, Rockingham, Sampson and Yancey. This would also be the last election in which North Carolina would vote to the left of neighboring Virginia. Additionally, with Bush and Clinton each winning 50 of North Carolina's 100 counties, this remains the last time that a Republican presidential nominee has failed to win a majority of the state's counties.

Republican nominee Lauch Faircloth defeated incumbent Democrat Terry Sanford in the concurrent U.S. Senate election.

== Results ==
1992 United States presidential election in North Carolina
Party	Candidate	Votes	Percentage	Electoral votes
Republican	George H. W. Bush (incumbent)	1,134,661	43.44%	14
Democratic	Bill Clinton	1,114,042	42.65%	0
Independent	Ross Perot	357,864	13.70%	0
Libertarian	Andre Marrou	5,171	0.20%	0
New Alliance Party	Lenora Fulani (write-in)	59	0.00%	0
Natural Law	Dr. John Hagelin (write-in)	41	0.00%	0
Socialist Workers Party	James Warren (write-in)	12	0.00%	0
Totals		2,611,850	100.0%	14
Voter turnout		54.52%		—

=== Results by county ===
County	George H.W. Bush Republican		Bill Clinton Democratic		Ross Perot Independent		Various candidates Other parties		Margin		Total
County	#	%	#	%	#	%	#	%	#	%	Total
Alamance	20,637	48.33%	15,521	36.35%	6,444	15.09%	99	0.23%	5,116	11.98%	42,701
Alexander	6,764	49.64%	4,849	35.59%	2,002	14.69%	11	0.08%	1,915	14.05%	13,626
Alleghany	1,853	39.18%	2,271	48.01%	600	12.68%	6	0.13%	-418	-8.83%	4,730
Anson	2,334	27.33%	5,269	61.71%	921	10.79%	15	0.18%	-2,935	-34.38%	8,539
Ashe	5,200	46.97%	4,624	41.77%	1,220	11.02%	26	0.23%	576	5.20%	11,070
Avery	3,895	57.39%	1,755	25.86%	1,123	16.55%	14	0.21%	2,140	31.53%	6,787
Beaufort	7,337	45.91%	6,445	40.33%	2,174	13.60%	24	0.15%	892	5.58%	15,980
Bertie	1,756	26.04%	4,382	64.99%	600	8.90%	5	0.07%	-2,626	-38.95%	6,743
Bladen	3,214	31.58%	5,700	56.01%	1,248	12.26%	15	0.15%	-2,486	-24.43%	10,177
Brunswick	8,833	39.43%	10,177	45.43%	3,349	14.95%	41	0.18%	-1,344	-6.00%	22,400
Buncombe	30,892	40.92%	32,955	43.65%	11,481	15.21%	164	0.22%	-2,063	-2.73%	75,492
Burke	13,397	44.48%	12,565	41.71%	4,124	13.69%	36	0.12%	832	2.77%	30,122
Cabarrus	21,281	51.75%	13,513	32.86%	6,251	15.20%	78	0.19%	7,768	18.89%	41,123
Caldwell	12,543	49.04%	9,033	35.32%	3,965	15.50%	35	0.14%	3,510	13.72%	25,576
Camden	1,039	38.84%	1,153	43.10%	479	17.91%	4	0.15%	-114	-4.26%	2,675
Carteret	10,334	47.36%	8,028	36.79%	3,401	15.59%	56	0.26%	2,306	10.57%	21,819
Caswell	2,793	33.40%	4,725	56.50%	827	9.89%	18	0.22%	-1,932	-23.10%	8,363
Catawba	25,466	51.54%	16,334	33.06%	7,523	15.23%	86	0.17%	9,132	18.48%	49,409
Chatham	6,568	35.36%	9,520	51.25%	2,425	13.05%	64	0.34%	-2,952	-15.89%	18,577
Cherokee	4,021	45.91%	3,686	42.09%	1,040	11.87%	11	0.13%	335	3.82%	8,758
Chowan	1,661	36.86%	2,136	47.40%	700	15.53%	9	0.20%	-475	-10.54%	4,506
Clay	1,890	47.73%	1,600	40.40%	465	11.74%	5	0.13%	290	7.33%	3,960
Cleveland	13,650	44.72%	13,037	42.71%	3,784	12.40%	51	0.17%	613	2.01%	30,522
Columbus	5,462	28.88%	11,469	60.63%	1,963	10.38%	22	0.12%	-6,007	-31.75%	18,916
Craven	11,575	45.77%	9,998	39.54%	3,679	14.55%	35	0.14%	1,577	6.23%	25,287
Cumberland	27,139	42.10%	30,291	46.98%	6,792	10.54%	248	0.38%	-3,152	-4.88%	64,470
Currituck	2,188	41.31%	1,935	36.53%	1,163	21.96%	11	0.21%	253	4.78%	5,297
Dare	4,357	40.73%	3,925	36.70%	2,388	22.33%	26	0.24%	432	4.03%	10,696
Davidson	24,869	50.01%	16,462	33.11%	8,324	16.74%	70	0.14%	8,407	16.90%	49,725
Davie	6,796	54.86%	3,675	29.67%	1,903	15.36%	13	0.10%	3,121	25.19%	12,387
Duplin	5,286	38.45%	6,816	49.58%	1,636	11.90%	9	0.07%	-1,530	-11.13%	13,747
Durham	27,581	33.36%	47,331	57.24%	8,504	9.08%	268	0.32%	-19,750	-23.88%	82,684
Edgecombe	6,275	31.92%	11,174	56.84%	2,175	11.06%	33	0.17%	-4,899	-24.92%	19,657
Forsyth	52,787	45.40%	49,006	42.15%	14,262	12.27%	219	0.19%	3,781	3.25%	116,274
Franklin	4,669	35.20%	6,517	49.13%	2,062	15.54%	18	0.14%	-1,848	-13.93%	13,266
Gaston	34,714	56.51%	19,121	31.12%	7,490	12.19%	110	0.18%	15,593	25.39%	61,435
Gates	1,158	30.20%	2,206	57.54%	466	12.15%	4	0.10%	-1,048	-27.34%	3,834
Graham	1,919	49.51%	1,551	40.02%	403	10.40%	3	0.08%	368	9.49%	3,876
Granville	4,538	37.42%	6,178	50.94%	1,321	10.89%	91	0.75%	-1,640	-13.52%	12,128
Greene	2,180	38.03%	2,768	48.29%	780	13.61%	4	0.07%	-588	-10.26%	5,732
Guilford	60,140	41.08%	66,319	45.30%	19,601	13.39%	339	0.23%	-6,179	-4.22%	146,399
Halifax	5,769	32.40%	9,960	55.94%	2,047	11.50%	28	0.16%	-4,191	-23.54%	17,804
Harnett	9,751	46.58%	8,473	40.48%	2,684	12.82%	24	0.11%	1,278	6.10%	20,932
Haywood	7,292	34.71%	10,385	49.43%	3,303	15.72%	29	0.14%	-3,093	-14.72%	21,009
Henderson	17,010	51.43%	10,747	32.50%	5,260	15.90%	55	0.17%	6,263	18.93%	33,072
Hertford	2,208	28.78%	4,609	60.08%	846	11.03%	9	0.12%	-2,401	-31.30%	7,672
Hoke	1,711	27.00%	3,730	58.86%	887	14.00%	9	0.14%	-2,019	-31.86%	6,337
Hyde	740	32.34%	1,206	52.71%	340	14.86%	2	0.09%	-466	-20.37%	2,288
Iredell	19,411	49.80%	13,263	34.03%	6,204	15.92%	102	0.26%	6,148	15.77%	38,980
Jackson	4,275	36.99%	5,753	49.78%	1,516	13.12%	14	0.12%	-1,478	-12.79%	11,558
Johnston	15,418	48.67%	11,284	35.62%	4,939	15.59%	38	0.12%	4,134	13.05%	31,679
Jones	1,438	37.39%	1,962	51.01%	444	11.54%	2	0.05%	-524	-13.62%	3,846
Lee	6,658	45.42%	5,852	39.92%	2,125	14.50%	24	0.16%	806	5.50%	14,659
Lenoir	8,932	45.02%	8,793	44.32%	2,107	10.62%	10	0.05%	139	0.70%	19,842
Lincoln	11,018	49.29%	8,150	36.46%	3,142	14.06%	45	0.20%	2,868	12.83%	22,355
Macon	4,797	42.53%	4,624	41.00%	1,829	16.22%	29	0.26%	173	1.53%	11,279
Madison	3,121	39.07%	3,980	49.82%	857	10.73%	31	0.39%	-859	-10.75%	7,989
Martin	2,958	36.90%	4,069	50.76%	981	12.24%	8	0.10%	-1,111	-13.86%	8,016
McDowell	6,090	45.81%	5,309	39.93%	1,881	14.15%	15	0.11%	781	5.88%	13,295
Mecklenburg	99,496	43.57%	97,065	42.50%	31,283	13.70%	531	0.23%	2,431	1.07%	228,375
Mitchell	4,405	62.79%	1,727	24.62%	877	12.50%	6	0.09%	2,678	38.17%	7,015
Montgomery	3,543	38.67%	4,422	48.27%	1,185	12.94%	11	0.12%	-879	-9.60%	9,161
Moore	12,448	46.81%	9,649	36.29%	4,448	16.73%	46	0.17%	2,799	10.52%	26,591
Nash	14,446	48.34%	10,809	36.17%	4,544	15.20%	87	0.29%	3,637	12.17%	29,886
New Hanover	24,338	46.67%	20,291	38.91%	7,401	14.19%	124	0.24%	4,047	7.76%	52,154
Northampton	1,845	23.16%	5,195	65.21%	916	11.50%	11	0.14%	-3,350	-42.05%	7,967
Onslow	11,842	48.70%	8,045	33.08%	4,387	18.04%	44	0.18%	3,797	15.62%	24,318
Orange	13,009	27.50%	28,595	60.45%	5,535	11.70%	161	0.34%	-15,586	-32.95%	47,300
Pamlico	1,929	38.77%	2,229	44.80%	809	16.26%	8	0.16%	-300	-6.03%	4,975
Pasquotank	3,419	35.69%	4,709	49.15%	1,434	14.97%	19	0.20%	-1,290	-13.46%	9,581
Pender	4,857	39.07%	5,825	46.86%	1,725	13.88%	23	0.19%	-968	-7.79%	12,430
Perquimans	1,429	36.85%	1,818	46.88%	624	16.09%	7	0.18%	-389	-10.03%	3,878
Person	4,460	43.60%	4,323	42.26%	1,431	13.99%	16	0.16%	137	1.34%	10,230
Pitt	16,609	41.63%	17,959	45.02%	5,262	13.19%	65	0.16%	-1,350	-3.39%	39,895
Polk	3,448	45.77%	2,939	39.02%	1,134	15.05%	12	0.16%	509	6.75%	7,533
Randolph	20,697	53.20%	11,274	28.98%	6,870	17.66%	61	0.16%	9,423	24.22%	38,902
Richmond	4,356	28.01%	9,163	58.91%	2,015	12.96%	19	0.12%	-4,807	-30.90%	15,553
Robeson	7,777	25.52%	19,378	63.59%	3,277	10.75%	42	0.14%	-11,601	-38.07%	30,474
Rockingham	12,678	40.54%	13,880	44.39%	4,671	14.94%	40	0.13%	-1,202	-3.85%	31,269
Rowan	21,297	49.84%	14,308	33.48%	7,053	16.51%	74	0.17%	6,989	16.36%	42,732
Rutherford	9,748	47.95%	7,855	38.64%	2,695	13.26%	31	0.15%	1,893	9.31%	20,329
Sampson	8,007	43.12%	8,698	46.84%	1,852	9.97%	11	0.06%	-691	-3.72%	18,568
Scotland	2,980	31.84%	5,175	55.29%	1,196	12.78%	9	0.10%	-2,195	-23.45%	9,360
Stanly	11,030	50.91%	7,735	35.70%	2,855	13.18%	44	0.20%	3,295	15.21%	21,664
Stokes	7,979	47.90%	6,463	38.80%	2,183	13.11%	32	0.19%	1,516	9.10%	16,657
Surry	10,866	46.33%	9,392	40.05%	3,164	13.49%	31	0.13%	1,474	6.28%	23,453
Swain	1,640	37.88%	2,117	48.89%	568	13.12%	5	0.12%	-477	-11.01%	4,330
Transylvania	5,984	45.55%	5,120	38.97%	2,006	15.27%	27	0.21%	864	6.58%	13,137
Tyrrell	553	33.03%	928	55.44%	189	11.29%	4	0.24%	-375	-22.41%	1,674
Union	16,542	51.71%	10,789	33.72%	4,601	14.38%	60	0.19%	5,753	17.99%	31,992
Vance	4,747	37.09%	6,598	51.55%	1,444	11.28%	11	0.09%	-1,851	-14.46%	12,800
Wake	86,798	41.84%	88,979	42.89%	31,140	15.01%	550	0.27%	-2,181	-1.05%	207,467
Warren	1,767	24.80%	4,656	65.35%	693	9.73%	9	0.13%	-2,889	-40.55%	7,125
Washington	1,780	33.89%	2,902	55.24%	563	10.72%	8	0.15%	-1,122	-21.35%	5,253
Watauga	7,899	41.09%	8,262	42.98%	3,007	15.64%	57	0.30%	-363	-1.89%	19,225
Wayne	14,397	52.29%	10,307	37.44%	2,798	10.16%	30	0.11%	4,090	14.85%	27,532
Wilkes	12,547	52.57%	7,991	33.48%	3,307	13.86%	23	0.10%	4,556	19.09%	23,868
Wilson	10,176	44.36%	10,105	44.06%	2,630	11.47%	26	0.11%	71	0.30%	22,937
Yadkin	7,311	56.34%	3,913	30.15%	1,725	13.29%	28	0.22%	3,398	26.19%	12,977
Yancey	3,994	43.38%	4,285	46.54%	917	9.96%	12	0.13%	-291	-3.16%	9,208
Totals	1,134,661	43.44%	1,114,042	42.65%	357,864	13.70%	5,283	0.20%	20,619	0.79%	2,611,850

==== Counties that flipped from Republican to Democratic ====
- Alleghany
- Brunswick
- Buncombe
- Camden
- Chowan
- Cumberland
- Franklin
- Guilford
- Jackson
- Madison
- Montgomery
- Pamlico
- Pasquotank
- Pender
- Perquimans
- Pitt
- Rockingham
- Sampson
- Wake
- Watauga
- Yancey

== Voter demographics ==
The 1992 presidential vote by demographic subgroup
Demographic subgroup	Clinton	Bush	Perot	% of total vote
Total vote	43	44	14	100
Party
Republican	7	84	9	37
Independent	38	36	26	18
Democratic	73	15	13	45
Ideology
Liberals	72	13	15	15
Moderates	49	35	16	47
Conservatives	20	69	10	38
Gender
Men	39	47	14	50
Women	46	41	13	50
Race
White	34	50	15	83
Black	91	5	3	17
Education
High school graduate	41	45	13	34
Some college	42	44	14	27
College	39	46	15	25
Postgraduate work	54	33	12	14
Age
18–29 years old	41	43	15	22
30–44 years old	43	42	15	33
45–59 years old	40	47	13	25
60 and older	49	43	9	16
Income
Under $30,000	51	35	14	42
$30,000–50,000	35	52	13	28
Over $50,000	36	49	15	29
Church attendance
Attend weekly	39	50	11	51
Attend less often	47	38	17	49

Source: Vote Research and Survey (1,563 surveyed)

== Works cited ==
- Moreland, Laurence; Steed, Robert; Baker, Tod, eds. (1991). The 1988 Presidential Election in the South: Continuity Amidst Change in Southern Party Politics. Praeger Publishers. ISBN 0275931455.
- Steed, Robert; Moreland, Laurence; Baker, Tod, eds. (1994). The 1992 Presidential Election in the South: Current Patterns of Southern Party and Electoral Politics. Praeger Publishers. ISBN 0275945340.
