= Cape Colony, North Carolina =

- Census-designated place
- Location within North Carolina Location within the United States
- Coordinates: 36°01′11″N 76°34′55″W
- Country: United States
- State: North Carolina
- County: Chowan

Area
  - Total: 1.36 sq mi (3.51 km^{2})
  - Land: 1.01 sq mi (2.62 km^{2})
  - Water: 0.34 sq mi (0.89 km^{2})
- Elevation: 3 ft (0.91 m)

Population (2020)
  - Total: 691
  - Density: 683.9/sq mi (264.06/km^{2})
- Time zone: UTC-5 (Eastern (EST))
  - Summer (DST): UTC-4 (EDT)
- ZIP Code: 27932 (Edenton)
- Area code: 252
- FIPS code: 37-10264
- GNIS feature ID: 2812785

Cape Colony is an unincorporated community and census-designated place (CDP) in Chowan County, North Carolina, United States. It was first listed as a CDP in the 2020 census with a population of 691.

The community is in southern Chowan County, on the northeast bank of the tidal Chowan River. It is bordered to the east by North Carolina State Highway 94, with Northeastern Regional Airport across the highway. Cape Colony is 5 miles (8 km) by road south of the center of Edenton, the county seat.

== Demographics ==
=== 2020 census ===
Cape Colony CDP, North Carolina – Racial and Ethnic Composition (NH = Non-Hispanic) Note: the US Census treats Hispanic/Latino as an ethnic category. This table excludes Latinos from the racial categories and assigns them to a separate category. Hispanics/Latinos may be of any race.
Race / Ethnicity	Pop 2020	% 2020
White alone (NH)	540	78.15%
Black or African American alone (NH)	84	12.16%
Native American or Alaska Native alone (NH)	1	0.14%
Asian alone (NH)	0	0.00%
Native Hawaiian or Pacific Islander alone (NH)	0	0.00%
Other race alone (NH)	6	0.87%
Mixed race or Multiracial (NH)	32	4.63%
Hispanic or Latino (any race)	28	4.05%
Total	691	100.00%
