= Sign Pine, North Carolina =

- Unincorporated community
- Location within North Carolina Location within the United States
- Coordinates: 36°18′33″N 76°37′27″W
- Country: United States
- State: North Carolina
- County: Chowan
- Elevation: 33 ft (10 m)
- Time zone: UTC-5 (Eastern (EST))
  - Summer (DST): UTC-4 (EDT)
- Area code: 252
- GNIS feature ID: 1025698

Sign Pine is an unincorporated community in Chowan County, North Carolina, United States. Sign Pine is located along North Carolina Highway 32, 17 miles (27 km) north of Edenton.
