= 1996 United States presidential election in North Carolina =

- November 5, 1996
- Turnout: 58.76% (▼9.64 pp)

Nominee	Bob Dole	Bill Clinton	Ross Perot
Party	Republican	Democratic	Reform
Home state	Kansas	Arkansas	Texas
Running mate	Jack Kemp	Al Gore	Pat Choate
Electoral vote	14	0	0
Popular vote	1,225,938	1,107,849	168,059
Percentage	48.73%	44.04%	6.68%

Dole
40–50%
50–60%
60–70%
Clinton
40–50%
50–60%
60–70%
President before election
Bill Clinton
Democratic
Elected President
Bill Clinton
Democratic

The 1996 United States presidential election in North Carolina took place on 5 November 1996 as part of the 1996 United States presidential election. Voters in North Carolina chose 14 representatives, or electors to the Electoral College, who voted for president and vice president.

North Carolina was narrowly won by the Republican nominee, Senator Bob Dole of Kansas, defeating incumbent Democratic President Bill Clinton of Arkansas. Dole won with a plurality of 48.73% of the vote to Clinton's 44.04%, a margin of 4.69%. The Reform Party candidate, billionaire businessman Ross Perot, came in a distant third, with 6.68%.

In 1992, Clinton became the first Democrat to win the White House without carrying North Carolina since the founding of the Republican Party and the only Democrat to ever secure two terms in office without North Carolina. Although the state remained competitive in 1996, Dole improved non-trivially on George H. W. Bush's margin on his way to becoming the second losing Republican to carry the state, reflecting the state's increasingly Republican orientation. Much of Dole's strength came from wins in large counties anchored by, or adjoining, an urban area. He flipped Wake County, home of Raleigh and the largest county in the nation he flipped outside California, carrying it by 2.3%. His top two raw vote margins in the state came from Gaston County, a suburban county adjoining Mecklenburg County (home of Charlotte), and Forsyth County, home of Winston-Salem; in the latter, he increased Bush's '92 margin of 3.2% to 11.3%. He also shrank Bill Clinton's margin in Guilford County, home of Greensboro, from 4.2% to 1.0%. (Clinton did, however, flip Mecklenburg County itself.)

As of the 2024 presidential election, this is the last election in which the following counties have voted for a Democratic presidential candidate: Camden, Duplin, Franklin, Haywood, Jones, Madison, Montgomery, Perquimans and Swain.

== Results ==
1996 United States presidential election in North Carolina
Party	Candidate	Votes	%	±%
Republican	Bob Dole	1,225,938	48.73	+5.29
Democratic	Bill Clinton (incumbent)	1,107,849	44.04	+1.39
Reform	Ross Perot	168,059	6.68	+6.68
Libertarian	Harry Browne	8,740	0.35	+0.15
Natural Law	John Hagelin	2,771	0.11	+0.11
Independent	Ralph Nader (write-in)	2,108	0.08	
Independent	Howard Phillips (write-in)	258	0.01	
Independent	James Harris (write-in)	84	0.00	
Turnout		2,515,807		

=== Results by county ===
County	Bob Dole Republican		Bill Clinton Democratic		Ross Perot Reform		Harry Browne Libertarian		Various candidates Other parties		Margin		Total
County	#	%	#	%	#	%	#	%	#	%	#	%	Total
Alamance	22,461	53.66%	15,814	37.78%	3,395	8.11%	145	0.35%	46	0.11%	6,647	15.88%	41,861
Alexander	6,748	57.53%	3,955	33.72%	1,004	8.56%	15	0.13%	8	0.07%	2,793	23.81%	11,730
Alleghany	1,936	45.71%	1,801	42.53%	458	10.81%	32	0.76%	8	0.19%	135	3.18%	4,235
Anson	2,193	28.77%	4,890	64.15%	512	6.72%	20	0.26%	8	0.10%	-2,697	-35.38%	7,623
Ashe	5,203	52.33%	3,825	38.47%	865	8.70%	29	0.29%	20	0.20%	1,378	13.86%	9,942
Avery	3,870	62.83%	1,586	25.75%	655	10.63%	28	0.45%	20	0.32%	2,284	37.08%	6,159
Beaufort	8,154	53.59%	6,172	40.57%	834	5.48%	35	0.23%	20	0.13%	1,982	13.02%	15,215
Bertie	1,745	27.83%	4,202	67.01%	316	5.04%	6	0.10%	2	0.03%	-2,457	-39.18%	6,271
Bladen	3,335	37.22%	4,952	55.27%	655	7.31%	10	0.11%	8	0.09%	-1,617	-18.05%	8,960
Brunswick	10,065	45.70%	10,041	45.59%	1,815	8.24%	75	0.34%	27	0.12%	24	0.11%	22,023
Buncombe	30,518	44.19%	31,658	45.84%	6,254	9.05%	335	0.49%	302	0.44%	-1,140	-1.65%	69,067
Burke	13,853	48.97%	11,678	41.28%	2,654	9.38%	76	0.27%	30	0.11%	2,175	7.69%	28,291
Cabarrus	23,035	55.76%	14,447	34.97%	3,626	8.78%	132	0.32%	70	0.17%	8,588	20.79%	41,310
Caldwell	12,653	55.18%	8,050	35.11%	2,099	9.15%	48	0.21%	81	0.35%	4,603	20.07%	22,931
Camden	1,074	41.86%	1,186	46.22%	293	11.42%	7	0.27%	6	0.23%	-112	-4.36%	2,566
Carteret	11,721	56.15%	7,566	36.24%	1,467	7.03%	75	0.36%	47	0.23%	4,155	19.91%	20,876
Caswell	3,310	40.57%	4,312	52.86%	510	6.25%	16	0.20%	10	0.12%	-1,002	-12.29%	8,158
Catawba	26,898	58.03%	15,601	33.66%	3,629	7.83%	171	0.37%	55	0.12%	11,297	24.37%	46,354
Chatham	7,731	42.03%	9,353	50.84%	1,113	6.05%	103	0.56%	96	0.52%	-1,622	-8.81%	18,396
Cherokee	3,883	49.26%	3,129	39.69%	785	9.96%	33	0.42%	53	0.67%	754	9.57%	7,883
Chowan	1,659	38.80%	2,239	52.36%	359	8.40%	14	0.33%	5	0.12%	-580	-13.56%	4,276
Clay	1,769	48.40%	1,462	40.00%	387	10.59%	31	0.85%	6	0.16%	307	8.40%	3,655
Cleveland	13,474	47.71%	12,728	45.07%	1,931	6.84%	71	0.25%	37	0.13%	746	2.64%	28,241
Columbus	6,017	36.96%	9,019	55.40%	1,170	7.19%	69	0.42%	5	0.03%	-3,002	-18.44%	16,280
Craven	13,264	52.65%	10,317	40.96%	1,528	6.07%	66	0.26%	16	0.06%	2,947	11.69%	25,191
Cumberland	29,804	44.83%	32,739	49.25%	3,776	5.68%	114	0.17%	46	0.07%	-2,935	-4.42%	66,479
Currituck	2,569	45.51%	2,277	40.34%	770	13.64%	24	0.43%	5	0.09%	292	5.17%	5,645
Dare	4,977	46.00%	4,522	41.79%	1,258	11.63%	33	0.30%	30	0.28%	455	4.21%	10,820
Davidson	24,797	58.75%	13,593	32.21%	3,698	8.76%	89	0.21%	30	0.07%	11,204	26.54%	42,207
Davie	8,141	64.51%	3,525	27.93%	915	7.25%	27	0.21%	12	0.10%	4,616	36.58%	12,620
Duplin	5,432	43.83%	6,179	49.86%	766	6.18%	14	0.11%	1	0.01%	-747	-6.03%	12,392
Durham	27,825	34.39%	49,186	60.79%	3,122	3.86%	332	0.41%	445	0.55%	-21,361	-26.40%	80,910
Edgecombe	6,010	34.78%	10,568	61.16%	660	3.82%	31	0.18%	9	0.05%	-4,558	-26.38%	17,278
Forsyth	59,160	52.81%	46,543	41.54%	5,747	5.13%	409	0.37%	174	0.16%	12,617	11.27%	112,033
Franklin	5,648	43.36%	6,448	49.50%	891	6.84%	29	0.22%	10	0.08%	-800	-6.14%	13,026
Gaston	33,149	58.42%	19,458	34.29%	3,921	6.91%	158	0.28%	53	0.09%	13,691	24.13%	56,739
Gates	1,072	30.27%	2,155	60.84%	307	8.67%	6	0.17%	2	0.06%	-1,083	-30.57%	3,542
Graham	1,801	54.76%	1,210	36.79%	270	8.21%	4	0.12%	4	0.12%	591	17.97%	3,289
Granville	5,498	42.95%	6,747	52.71%	432	3.38%	110	0.86%	13	0.10%	-1,249	-9.76%	12,800
Greene	2,689	51.73%	2,224	42.79%	280	5.39%	2	0.04%	3	0.06%	465	8.94%	5,198
Guilford	67,727	45.89%	69,208	46.89%	9,739	6.60%	605	0.41%	308	0.21%	-1,481	-1.00%	147,587
Halifax	5,700	35.40%	9,551	59.31%	816	5.07%	24	0.15%	12	0.07%	-3,851	-23.91%	16,103
Harnett	11,596	53.34%	8,767	40.33%	1,287	5.92%	33	0.15%	56	0.26%	2,829	13.01%	21,739
Haywood	7,995	39.84%	9,350	46.59%	2,594	12.93%	77	0.38%	53	0.26%	-1,355	-6.75%	20,069
Henderson	19,182	58.70%	10,626	32.52%	2,679	8.20%	135	0.41%	54	0.17%	8,556	26.18%	32,676
Hertford	1,823	25.86%	4,856	68.89%	356	5.05%	7	0.10%	7	0.10%	-3,033	-43.03%	7,049
Hoke	1,914	32.28%	3,510	59.20%	481	8.11%	14	0.24%	10	0.17%	-1,596	-26.92%	5,929
Hyde	782	38.30%	1,109	54.31%	143	7.00%	6	0.29%	2	0.10%	-327	-16.01%	2,042
Iredell	21,163	56.57%	13,102	35.02%	2,970	7.94%	114	0.30%	60	0.16%	8,061	21.55%	37,409
Jackson	4,244	40.40%	5,211	49.60%	970	9.23%	51	0.49%	30	0.29%	-967	-9.20%	10,506
Johnston	18,704	58.23%	11,175	34.79%	2,163	6.73%	55	0.17%	22	0.07%	7,529	23.44%	32,119
Jones	1,682	45.28%	1,829	49.23%	197	5.30%	5	0.13%	2	0.05%	-147	-3.95%	3,715
Lee	7,321	50.04%	6,290	42.99%	980	6.70%	28	0.19%	11	0.08%	1,031	7.05%	14,630
Lenoir	9,433	49.84%	8,635	45.63%	822	4.34%	23	0.12%	12	0.06%	798	4.21%	18,925
Lincoln	11,439	54.86%	7,721	37.03%	1,619	7.76%	43	0.21%	28	0.13%	3,718	17.83%	20,850
Macon	5,267	49.34%	4,209	39.43%	1,121	10.50%	44	0.41%	34	0.32%	1,058	9.91%	10,675
Madison	3,110	44.24%	3,333	47.41%	538	7.65%	16	0.23%	33	0.47%	-223	-3.17%	7,030
Martin	3,590	41.98%	4,500	52.62%	445	5.20%	15	0.18%	2	0.02%	-910	-10.64%	8,552
McDowell	6,407	52.18%	4,553	37.08%	1,275	10.38%	26	0.21%	17	0.14%	1,854	15.10%	12,278
Mecklenburg	97,719	45.91%	103,429	48.59%	10,473	4.92%	772	0.36%	452	0.21%	-5,710	-2.68%	212,845
Mitchell	3,874	65.15%	1,496	25.16%	549	9.23%	20	0.34%	7	0.12%	2,378	39.99%	5,946
Montgomery	3,379	43.11%	3,856	49.20%	587	7.49%	8	0.10%	8	0.10%	-477	-6.09%	7,838
Moore	14,760	55.74%	9,847	37.19%	1,761	6.65%	61	0.23%	50	0.19%	4,913	18.55%	26,479
Nash	15,309	54.17%	11,142	39.42%	1,751	6.20%	51	0.18%	9	0.03%	4,167	14.75%	28,262
New Hanover	27,889	50.92%	22,839	41.70%	3,615	6.60%	322	0.59%	104	0.19%	5,050	9.22%	54,769
Northampton	1,881	25.08%	5,207	69.44%	402	5.36%	8	0.11%	1	0.01%	-3,326	-44.36%	7,499
Onslow	13,396	55.70%	8,685	36.11%	1,857	7.72%	88	0.37%	23	0.10%	4,711	19.59%	24,049
Orange	15,053	32.19%	28,674	61.32%	1,534	3.28%	906	1.94%	598	1.28%	-13,621	-29.13%	46,765
Pamlico	2,270	47.39%	2,204	46.01%	297	6.20%	16	0.33%	3	0.06%	66	1.38%	4,790
Pasquotank	2,999	38.34%	4,233	54.12%	565	7.22%	16	0.20%	9	0.12%	-1,234	-15.78%	7,822
Pender	5,538	46.38%	5,409	45.30%	945	7.91%	30	0.25%	18	0.15%	129	1.08%	11,940
Perquimans	1,561	38.88%	2,069	51.53%	369	9.19%	12	0.30%	4	0.10%	-508	-12.65%	4,015
Person	4,883	48.68%	4,540	45.26%	591	5.89%	13	0.13%	3	0.03%	343	3.42%	10,030
Pitt	18,227	47.95%	17,555	46.18%	2,037	5.36%	90	0.24%	102	0.27%	672	1.77%	38,011
Polk	3,516	52.04%	2,704	40.02%	493	7.30%	30	0.44%	13	0.19%	812	12.02%	6,756
Randolph	23,030	61.36%	10,783	28.73%	3,593	9.57%	82	0.22%	47	0.13%	12,247	32.63%	37,535
Richmond	3,973	31.04%	7,564	59.09%	1,230	9.61%	16	0.12%	18	0.14%	-3,591	-28.05%	12,801
Robeson	8,146	29.53%	17,361	62.95%	2,015	7.31%	40	0.15%	19	0.07%	-9,215	-33.42%	27,581
Rockingham	14,255	49.22%	12,096	41.77%	2,528	8.73%	36	0.12%	44	0.15%	2,159	7.45%	28,959
Rowan	22,754	57.94%	13,461	34.28%	2,902	7.39%	117	0.30%	39	0.10%	9,293	23.66%	39,273
Rutherford	9,792	52.73%	7,162	38.57%	1,585	8.53%	21	0.11%	11	0.06%	2,630	14.16%	18,571
Sampson	8,241	47.82%	8,150	47.30%	825	4.79%	12	0.07%	4	0.02%	91	0.52%	17,232
Scotland	2,858	34.44%	4,870	58.68%	548	6.60%	11	0.13%	12	0.14%	-2,012	-24.24%	8,299
Stanly	11,446	56.29%	7,131	35.07%	1,690	8.31%	46	0.23%	20	0.10%	4,315	21.22%	20,333
Stokes	9,471	61.82%	4,769	31.13%	1,025	6.69%	45	0.29%	10	0.07%	4,702	30.69%	15,320
Surry	11,117	55.53%	7,303	36.48%	1,538	7.68%	44	0.22%	19	0.09%	3,814	19.05%	20,021
Swain	1,444	38.80%	1,869	50.21%	401	10.77%	6	0.16%	2	0.05%	-425	-11.41%	3,722
Transylvania	6,734	52.29%	4,842	37.60%	1,183	9.19%	54	0.42%	64	0.50%	1,892	14.69%	12,877
Tyrrell	488	32.25%	908	60.01%	112	7.40%	4	0.26%	1	0.07%	-420	-27.76%	1,513
Union	18,802	57.03%	11,525	34.96%	2,477	7.51%	117	0.35%	49	0.15%	7,277	22.07%	32,970
Vance	4,651	39.97%	6,385	54.88%	575	4.94%	17	0.15%	7	0.06%	-1,734	-14.91%	11,635
Wake	108,780	48.18%	103,574	45.88%	11,811	5.23%	979	0.43%	611	0.27%	5,206	2.30%	225,755
Warren	1,861	29.36%	4,141	65.33%	319	5.03%	10	0.16%	8	0.13%	-2,280	-35.97%	6,339
Washington	1,562	34.47%	2,790	61.56%	171	3.77%	7	0.15%	2	0.04%	-1,228	-27.09%	4,532
Watauga	8,146	47.30%	7,349	42.67%	1,415	8.22%	139	0.81%	173	1.00%	797	4.63%	17,222
Wayne	16,588	56.44%	11,580	39.40%	1,178	4.01%	30	0.10%	14	0.05%	5,008	17.04%	29,390
Wilkes	12,395	58.39%	6,793	32.00%	1,967	9.27%	58	0.27%	15	0.07%	5,602	26.39%	21,228
Wilson	10,518	49.03%	9,779	45.59%	1,100	5.13%	31	0.14%	23	0.11%	739	3.44%	21,451
Yadkin	8,439	68.54%	2,927	23.77%	913	7.41%	22	0.18%	12	0.10%	5,512	44.77%	12,313
Yancey	3,973	45.75%	3,956	45.56%	720	8.29%	18	0.21%	17	0.20%	17	0.19%	8,684
Totals	1,225,938	48.73%	1,107,849	44.04%	168,059	6.68%	8,740	0.35%	5,221	0.21%	118,089	4.69%	2,515,807

==== Counties that flipped from Democratic to Republican ====
- Alleghany
- Brunswick
- Greene
- Pamlico
- Pender
- Pitt
- Rockingham
- Sampson
- Wake
- Watauga
- Yancey

==== Counties that flipped from Republican to Democratic ====
- Mecklenburg

== Electors ==
Technically the voters of North Carolina cast their ballots for electors: representatives to the Electoral College. North Carolina was allocated 14 electors because it had 12 congressional districts and 2 senators. All candidates that appear on the ballot or qualify to receive write-in votes must submit a list of 14 electors, who pledge to vote for their candidate and his or her running mate. Whoever wins the majority of votes in the state is awarded all 14 electoral votes. Their chosen electors then vote for president and vice president. Although electors are pledged to their candidate and running mate, they are not obligated to vote for them. An elector who votes for someone other than his or her candidate is known as a faithless elector.

The following were the members of the Electoral College from the state. All were pledged to and voted for Bob Dole and Jack Kemp:

1. Howard B. Smith
2. Bettie West
3. J.D. Teachey
4. Nelson Dollar
5. Lee Q. McMillan
6. Carolyn McGee
7. Jim Cole
8. Tom Dwiggins
9. John Van Hanford
10. Gary Whitener
11. George Alexander Jones
12. Quentine Finch
13. Bill Graham
14. Dorothy Bursey
