= Chowan County, North Carolina =

County in North Carolina, United States

- County
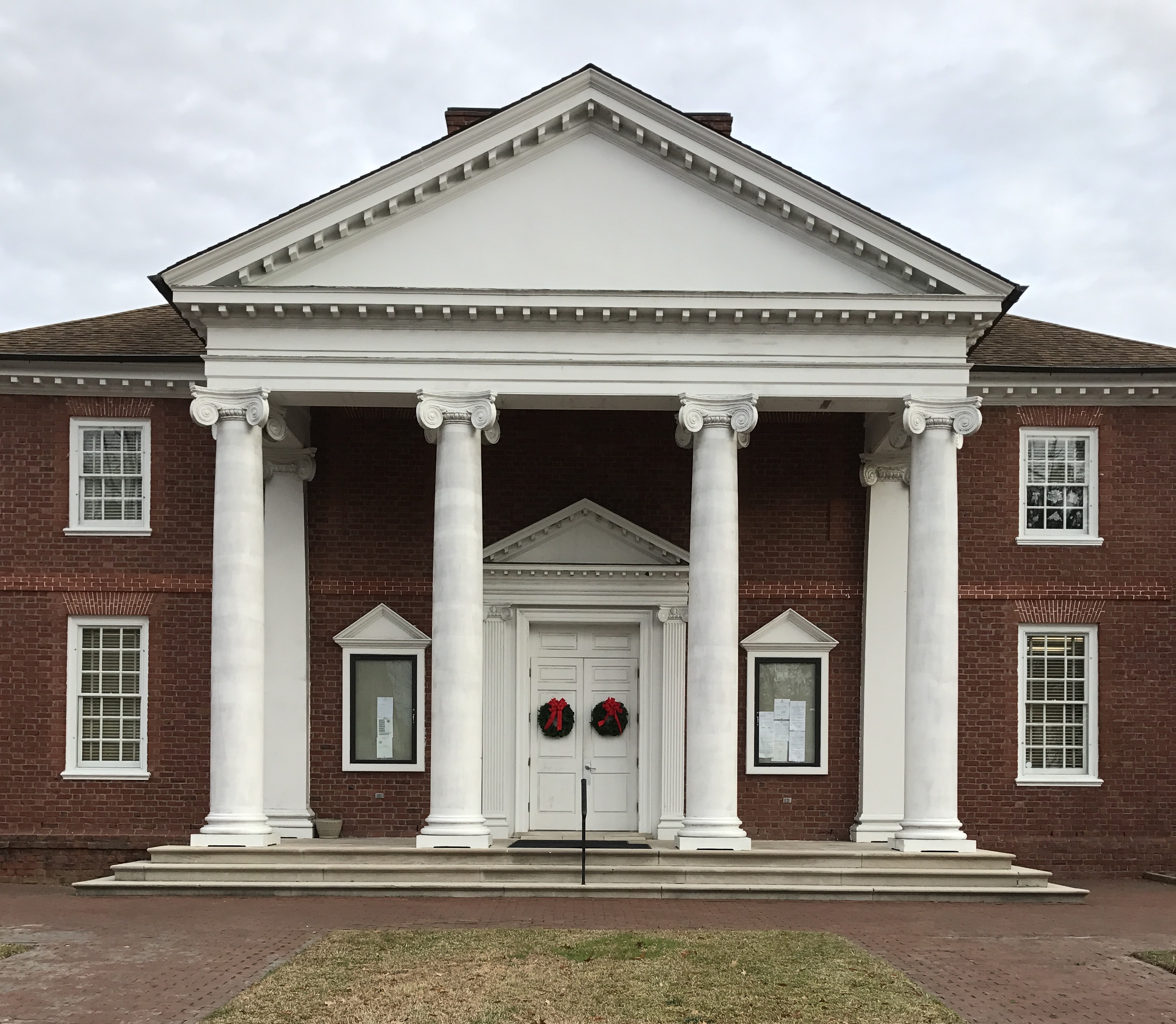
- Chowan County Courthouse

- Flag Seal

- Location within the U.S. state of North Carolina
- Interactive map of Chowan County, North Carolina
- Coordinates: 36.13°N 76.60°W
- Country: United States
- State: North Carolina
- Founded: 1668
- Named for: Chowanoke Indian Tribe
- Seat: Edenton
- Largest community: Edenton

Area
  - Total: 233.65 sq mi (605.2 km^{2})
  - Land: 172.66 sq mi (447.2 km^{2})
  - Water: 60.99 sq mi (158.0 km^{2}) 26.10%

Population (2020)
  - Total: 13,708
  - Estimate (2025): 14,082 ▲
  - Density: 79.39/sq mi (30.65/km^{2})
- Time zone: UTC−5 (Eastern)
  - Summer (DST): UTC−4 (EDT)
- Congressional district: 1st
- Website: www.chowancounty-nc.gov

Chowan County (/tʃoʊˈwɒn/ choh-WON) is one of the 100 counties located in the U.S. state of North Carolina. As of the 2020 census, the population was 13,708. Its county seat is Edenton. The county was created between 1668 and 1671 as Shaftesbury Precinct and later renamed Chowan Precinct. It gained county status in 1739.

== History ==
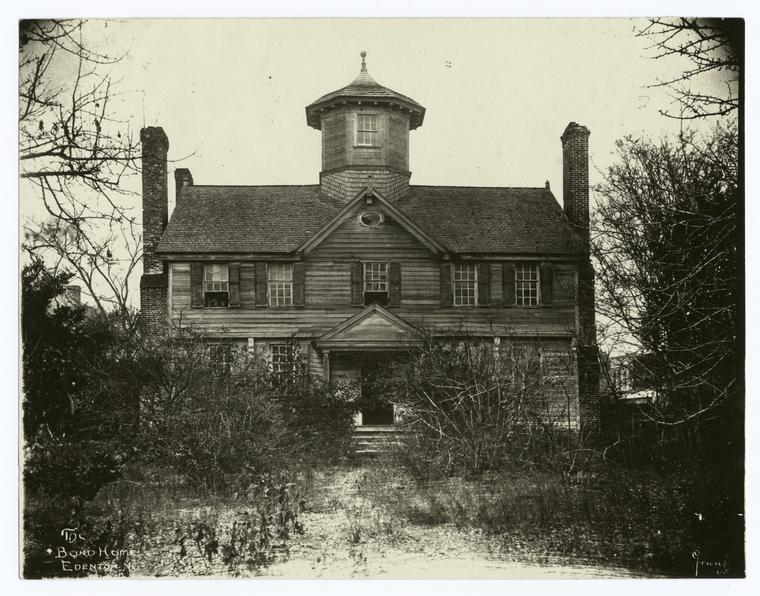
The Bond House, Edenton, Chowan County, c. 1920

Chowan was formed in 1670 as a precinct, originally called Shaftesbury, in Albemarle County. By 1685 it had been renamed for the Chowan Indian tribe, which lived in the northeastern part of the Carolina Colony.

Chowan County is in the northeastern section of the State and is bounded by Albemarle Sound, Chowan River, and the counties of Bertie, Hertford, Gates, and Perquimans. The present land area is 172.64 square miles and the 2000 population was 14,150.

In 1720, Edenton, which was named in honor of Governor Charles Eden, was established. In 1722 it was designated, and has continued to be, the county seat.

During the American Civil War, the Albemarle Artillery was recruited in 1862 from Chowan and Tyrrell men at Edenton by local attorney William Badham, Jr. After cannons were recast from bronze donated as bells from local courthouses and churches to arm the battery, the unit was renamed the Edenton Bell Battery. They named their cannon: Columbia, St. Paul, Fannie Roulac, and Edenton. Two of the guns, long thought lost, have been returned to Edenton in recent years. The St. Paul and the Edenton now can be seen on display at Edenton's waterfront park. The county was named after the historical Chowanoc American Indian tribe, also called Chowan.

== Geography ==
According to the U.S. Census Bureau, the county has a total area of 233.65 square miles (605.2 km^{2}), of which 172.66 square miles (447.2 km^{2}) is land and 61.99 square miles (160.6 km^{2}) (26.10%) is water. It is the smallest county in North Carolina by land area and third-smallest by total area.

=== State and local protected sites ===
- Historic Edenton
- James Iredell House

=== Major water bodies ===
- Albemarle Sound
- Chowan River

=== Adjacent counties ===
- Gates County – north
- Perquimans County – east
- Tyrrell County – southeast
- Washington County – south
- Bertie County – west
- Hertford County – northwest

=== Major highways ===
- Future I-87
- US 17
- US 17 Bus.
- NC 32
- NC 37
- NC 94

=== Major infrastructure ===
- Northeastern Regional Airport

== Demographics ==
Historical population
Census	Pop.	Note	%±
1790	4,988		—
1800	5,132		2.9%
1810	5,297		3.2%
1820	6,464		22.0%
1830	6,697		3.6%
1840	6,690		−0.1%
1850	6,721		0.5%
1860	6,842		1.8%
1870	6,450		−5.7%
1880	7,900		22.5%
1890	9,167		16.0%
1900	10,258		11.9%
1910	11,303		10.2%
1920	10,649		−5.8%
1930	11,282		5.9%
1940	11,572		2.6%
1950	12,540		8.4%
1960	11,729		−6.5%
1970	10,764		−8.2%
1980	12,558		16.7%
1990	13,506		7.5%
2000	14,526		7.6%
2010	14,793		1.8%
2020	13,708		−7.3%
2025 (est.)	14,082	▲	2.7%
U.S. Decennial Census; 1790–1960 1900–1990; 1990–2000 2010 2020

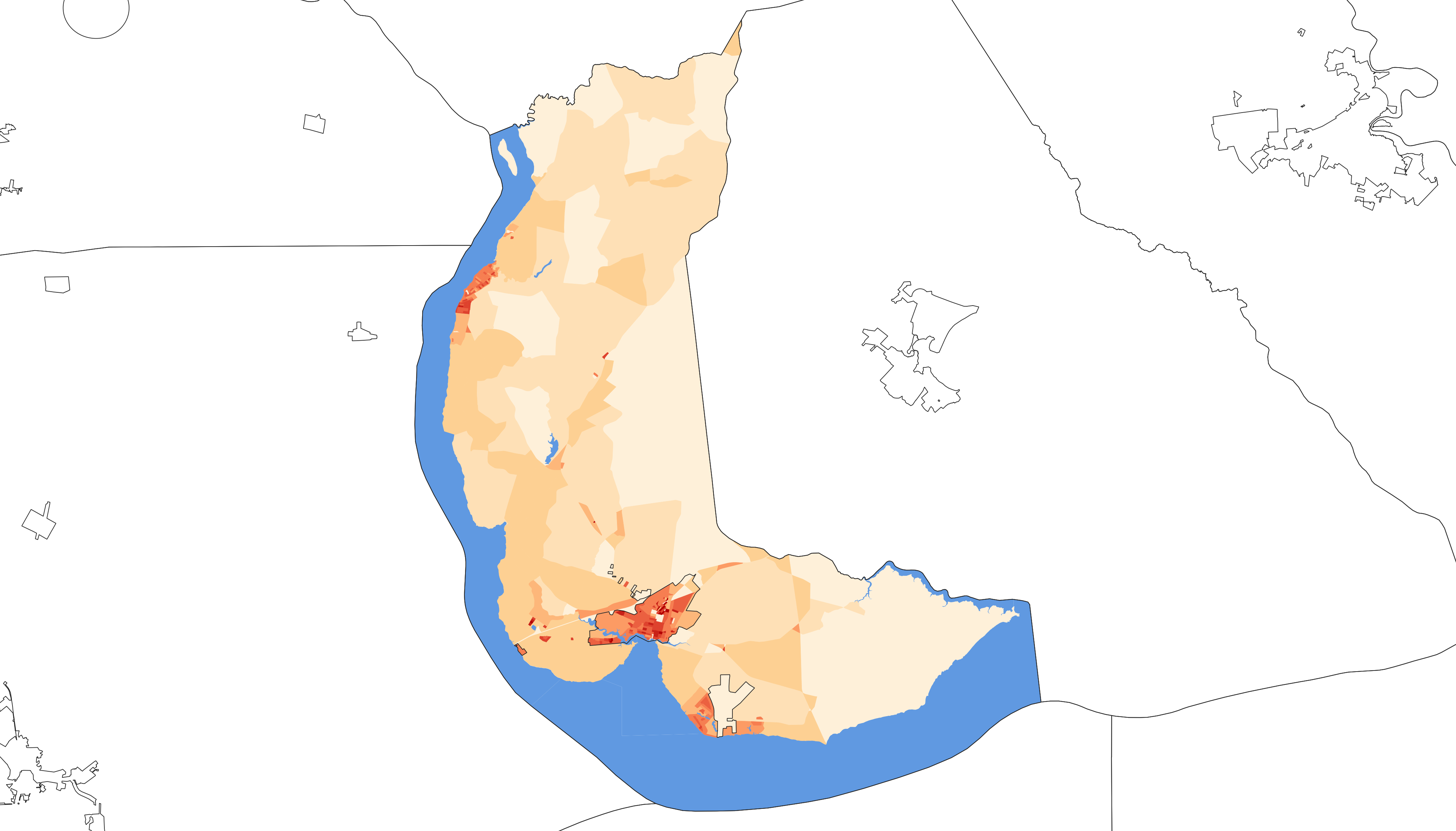
2020 population density of Chowan County NC by census block

=== 2020 census ===
As of the 2020 census, there were 13,708 people, 5,884 households, and 3,986 families residing in the county. The median age was 49.1 years; 18.9% of residents were under the age of 18 and 26.9% of residents were 65 years of age or older. For every 100 females there were 90.7 males, and for every 100 females age 18 and over there were 87.4 males age 18 and over.

The racial makeup of the county was 60.9% White, 32.2% Black or African American, 0.3% American Indian and Alaska Native, 0.3% Asian, <0.1% Native Hawaiian and Pacific Islander, 2.2% from some other race, and 4.1% from two or more races. Hispanic or Latino residents of any race comprised 3.9% of the population.

Of the 5,884 households in the county, 25.8% had children under the age of 18 living in them. Of all households, 45.1% were married-couple households, 17.0% were households with a male householder and no spouse or partner present, and 33.1% were households with a female householder and no spouse or partner present. About 30.8% of all households were made up of individuals and 16.7% had someone living alone who was 65 years of age or older.

There were 7,131 housing units, of which 17.5% were vacant. Among occupied housing units, 70.4% were owner-occupied and 29.6% were renter-occupied. The homeowner vacancy rate was 1.6% and the rental vacancy rate was 10.4%.

31.6% of residents lived in urban areas, while 68.4% lived in rural areas.

=== Racial and ethnic composition ===
Chowan County, North Carolina – Racial and ethnic composition Note: the US Census treats Hispanic/Latino as an ethnic category. This table excludes Latinos from the racial categories and assigns them to a separate category. Hispanics/Latinos may be of any race.
Race / Ethnicity (NH = Non-Hispanic)	Pop 1980	Pop 1990	Pop 2000	Pop 2010	Pop 2020	% 1980	% 1990	% 2000	% 2010	% 2020
White alone (NH)	7,270	8,314	8,703	9,040	8,268	57.89%	61.56%	59.91%	61.11%	60.32%
Black or African American alone (NH)	5,164	5,041	5,415	5,054	4,376	41.12%	37.32%	37.28%	34.16%	31.92%
Native American or Alaska Native alone (NH)	19	23	42	38	43	0.15%	0.17%	0.29%	0.26%	0.31%
Asian alone (NH)	30	29	50	51	39	0.24%	0.21%	0.34%	0.34%	0.28%
Native Hawaiian or Pacific Islander alone (NH)	x	x	0	2	1	x	x	0.00%	0.01%	0.01%
Other race alone (NH)	1	4	6	3	18	0.01%	0.03%	0.04%	0.02%	0.13%
Mixed race or Multiracial (NH)	x	x	91	138	433	x	x	0.63%	0.93%	3.16%
Hispanic or Latino (any race)	74	95	219	467	530	0.59%	0.70%	1.51%	3.16%	3.87%
Total	12,558	13,506	14,526	14,793	13,708	100.00%	100.00%	100.00%	100.00%	100.00%

=== 2010 census ===
At the 2010 census there were 14,793 people, 5,580 households, and 4,006 families residing in the county. The population density was 84 people per square mile (32 people/km^{2}). There were 6,443 housing units at an average density of 37 units per square mile (14 units/km^{2}). The racial makeup of the county was 62.0% White, 34.3% Black or African American, 0.3% Native American, 0.4% Asian, 0.0% Pacific Islander, 1.8% from other races, and 1.2% from two or more races. 3.2% of the population were Hispanic or Latino of any race.

There were 5,580 households, out of which 30.30% had children under the age of 18 living with them, 53.00% were married couples living together, 15.70% had a female householder with no husband present, and 28.20% were non-families. 25.30% of all households were made up of individuals, and 12.10% had someone living alone who was 65 years of age or older. The average household size was 2.48 and the average family size was 2.94.

In the county, the population was spread out, with 23.90% under the age of 18, 9.60% from 18 to 24, 24.10% from 25 to 44, 24.40% from 45 to 64, and 17.90% who were 65 years of age or older. The median age was 40 years. For every 100 females there were 88.10 males. For every 100 females age 18 and over, there were 84.60 males.

The median income for a household in the county was $30,928, and the median income for a family was $36,986. Males had a median income of $29,719 versus $19,826 for females. The per capita income for the county was $15,027. About 13.70% of families and 17.60% of the population were below the poverty line, including 25.50% of those under age 18 and 16.70% of those age 65 or over.

== Government and politics ==
Chowan County is a member of the Albemarle Commission regional council of governments.

Chowan County is represented by Bobby Hanig in the 1st district of the North Carolina Senate.

United States presidential election results for Chowan County, North Carolina
Year	Republican		Democratic		Third party(ies)	
Year	No.	%	No.	%	No.	%
1912	60	7.50%	663	82.88%	77	9.63%
1916	91	12.96%	610	86.89%	1	0.14%
1920	209	16.08%	1,091	83.92%	0	0.00%
1924	98	12.00%	714	87.39%	5	0.61%
1928	352	27.33%	936	72.67%	0	0.00%
1932	64	3.75%	1,639	95.96%	5	0.29%
1936	96	5.83%	1,550	94.17%	0	0.00%
1940	87	5.32%	1,547	94.68%	0	0.00%
1944	166	11.22%	1,314	88.78%	0	0.00%
1948	124	9.73%	1,070	83.99%	80	6.28%
1952	537	27.05%	1,448	72.95%	0	0.00%
1956	556	27.24%	1,485	72.76%	0	0.00%
1960	533	21.73%	1,920	78.27%	0	0.00%
1964	787	31.70%	1,696	68.30%	0	0.00%
1968	798	21.60%	1,201	32.50%	1,696	45.90%
1972	1,906	66.39%	936	32.60%	29	1.01%
1976	1,019	35.27%	1,862	64.45%	8	0.28%
1980	1,424	38.91%	2,146	58.63%	90	2.46%
1984	2,171	55.41%	1,736	44.31%	11	0.28%
1988	1,884	51.56%	1,756	48.06%	14	0.38%
1992	1,661	36.86%	2,136	47.40%	709	15.73%
1996	1,659	38.80%	2,239	52.36%	378	8.84%
2000	2,415	49.39%	2,430	49.69%	45	0.92%
2004	2,967	55.09%	2,406	44.67%	13	0.24%
2008	3,773	50.23%	3,688	49.09%	51	0.68%
2012	3,891	51.85%	3,556	47.38%	58	0.77%
2016	4,014	55.53%	2,992	41.39%	222	3.07%
2020	4,471	57.44%	3,247	41.71%	66	0.85%
2024	4,587	60.74%	2,895	38.33%	70	0.93%

== Communities ==
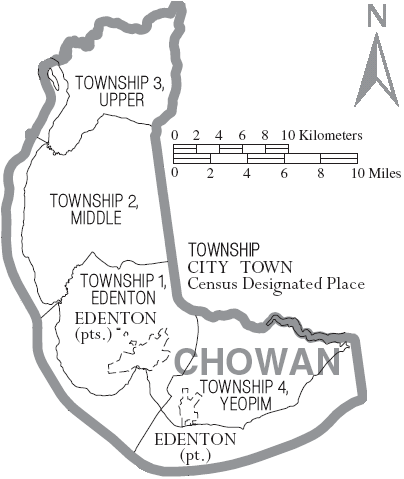
Map of Chowan County with municipal and township labels

=== Town ===
- Edenton (county seat and largest community)

=== Townships ===
- Township 1, Edenton
- Township 2, Middle
- Township 3, Upper
- Township 4, Yeopim

=== Census-designated places ===
- Arrowhead Beach
- Cape Colony
- Chowan Beach

=== Other unincorporated places ===
- Rockyhock
- Selwin
- Sign Pine
- Tyner

== See also ==
- List of counties in North Carolina
- National Register of Historic Places listings in Chowan County, North Carolina
- North Carolina v. Mann (1830), slave court case related to Chowan County
