= 1976 United States presidential election in North Carolina =

- November 2, 1976
- Turnout: 65.70% ▲1.29 pp

Nominee	Jimmy Carter	Gerald Ford
Party	Democratic	Republican
Home state	Georgia	Michigan
Running mate	Walter Mondale	Bob Dole
Electoral vote	13	0
Popular vote	927,365	741,960
Percentage	55.27%	44.22%

Carter
50–60%
60–70%
70–80%
80–90%
Ford
40–50%
50–60%
60–70%
President before election
Gerald R. Ford
Republican
Elected President
Jimmy Carter
Democratic

The 1976 United States presidential election in North Carolina took place on November 2, 1976, and was part of the 1976 United States presidential election. Voters chose 13 representatives, or electors to the Electoral College, who voted for president and vice president.

Among white voters, 51% supported Ford while 48% supported Carter.

As of the 2024 presidential election, this is the last time a Democrat won North Carolina with a majority of the vote, and the last time that North Carolina would vote Democratic in a presidential election until 2008. This is also the last time a Democrat has won Gaston County, Onslow County, Polk County, Johnston County, Iredell County, Alamance County, Rowan County, Craven County, Burke County, Caldwell County, Lincoln County, Surry County, Rutherford County, Carteret County, Stanly County, Beaufort County, Stokes County, McDowell County, Alexander County, Dare County, Macon County, Transylvania County, Cherokee County, Ashe County, Clay County, and Graham County.

== Primary Elections ==
=== Democratic primary ===
Former Georgia Governor Jimmy Carter scored a decisive victory over Alabama Gov. George Wallace in the North Carolina Democratic presidential primary on March 23, 1976, with approximately 53% of the vote to Wallace's 35%. Sen. Scoop Jackson trailed far behind, with approximately 4%. The North Carolina primary was the first in which Carter won an absolute majority and helped seal his ultimate nomination. Wallace, who had won the North Carolina primary in 1972, was all but eliminated from the race by his defeat.

=== Republican primary ===
Former California Governor Ronald Reagan defeated incumbent President Ford in the North Carolina Republican presidential primary on March 23, 1976, with approximately 52% of the vote. It was Reagan's first primary victory of 1976, and came about with key support from North Carolina Senator Jesse Helms. Reagan's win prolonged the contest for the Republican nomination and paved the way for him to be elected president in 1980. Reagan would go on to narrowly win the state in 1980.

== Campaign ==
=== Predictions ===
Source	Rating	As of
The Atlanta Constitution	Safe D (flip)	September 13, 1976
Simpson’s Leader-Times	Tilt D (flip)	October 18, 1976
The Chapel Hill News	Tossup	October 24, 1976
Sun Herald	Tilt D (flip)	October 25, 1976
Kansas City Times	Tossup	October 26, 1976
Daily News	Lean D (flip)	October 27, 1976
Austin American-Statesman	Lean D (flip)	October 31, 1976

== Results ==
1976 United States presidential election in North Carolina
Party	Candidate	Votes	Percentage	Electoral votes
Democratic	Jimmy Carter	927,365	55.23%	13
Republican	Gerald Ford (incumbent)	741,960	44.19%	0
American	Thomas Anderson	5,607	0.33%	0
Libertarian	Roger MacBride	2,219	0.13%	0
Write-in	Eugene McCarthy	855	0.01%	0
US Labor	Lyndon LaRouche	755	0.04%	0
Write-ins	—	169	0.01%	0
Write-in	Ronald Reagan	87	0.01%	0
Totals		1,677,906	100.0%	13
Voter turnout		54.52%		—

=== Results by county ===
County	Jimmy Carter Democratic		Gerald Ford Republican		Thomas Anderson American		Roger MacBride Libertarian		Lyndon LaRouche U.S. Labor		Margin		Total
County	#	%	#	%	#	%	#	%	#	%	#	%	Total
Alamance	17,371	57.46%	12,680	41.94%	138	0.46%	38	0.13%	4	0.01%	4,691	15.52%	30,231
Alexander	5,287	53.00%	4,661	46.73%	20	0.20%	6	0.06%	1	0.01%	626	6.27%	9,975
Alleghany	2,550	62.26%	1,532	37.40%	10	0.24%	3	0.07%	1	0.02%	1,018	24.86%	4,096
Anson	4,796	74.68%	1,608	25.04%	9	0.14%	4	0.06%	5	0.08%	3,188	49.64%	6,422
Ashe	5,193	51.14%	4,937	48.62%	19	0.19%	1	0.01%	5	0.05%	256	2.52%	10,155
Avery	1,869	37.44%	3,085	61.80%	25	0.50%	5	0.10%	8	0.16%	-1,216	-24.36%	4,992
Beaufort	5,728	54.72%	4,677	44.68%	46	0.44%	11	0.11%	5	0.05%	1,051	10.04%	10,467
Bertie	4,117	75.27%	1,332	24.35%	13	0.24%	4	0.07%	4	0.07%	2,785	50.92%	5,470
Bladen	6,009	79.18%	1,546	20.37%	26	0.34%	6	0.08%	2	0.03%	4,463	58.81%	7,589
Brunswick	7,377	66.66%	3,636	32.86%	36	0.33%	15	0.14%	2	0.02%	3,741	33.80%	11,066
Buncombe	26,633	53.94%	22,461	45.49%	177	0.36%	84	0.17%	24	0.05%	4,172	8.45%	49,379
Burke	14,254	58.34%	10,070	41.22%	66	0.27%	30	0.12%	11	0.05%	4,184	17.12%	24,431
Cabarrus	12,049	48.92%	12,455	50.57%	85	0.35%	31	0.13%	10	0.04%	-406	-1.65%	24,630
Caldwell	11,894	54.39%	9,872	45.15%	52	0.24%	33	0.15%	15	0.07%	2,022	9.24%	21,866
Camden	1,231	68.05%	562	31.07%	16	0.88%	0	0.00%	0	0.00%	669	36.98%	1,809
Carteret	7,080	54.72%	5,786	44.72%	54	0.42%	17	0.13%	2	0.02%	1,294	10.00%	12,939
Caswell	3,707	67.54%	1,761	32.08%	19	0.35%	2	0.04%	0	0.00%	1,946	35.46%	5,489
Catawba	16,862	47.22%	18,696	52.36%	101	0.28%	36	0.10%	13	0.04%	-1,834	-5.14%	35,708
Chatham	6,397	59.65%	4,279	39.90%	23	0.21%	23	0.21%	3	0.03%	2,118	19.75%	10,725
Cherokee	3,571	52.15%	3,210	46.88%	60	0.88%	4	0.06%	3	0.04%	361	5.27%	6,848
Chowan	1,862	64.45%	1,019	35.27%	7	0.24%	1	0.03%	0	0.00%	843	29.18%	2,889
Clay	1,569	52.09%	1,428	47.41%	14	0.46%	1	0.03%	0	0.00%	141	4.68%	3,012
Cleveland	14,406	63.78%	8,106	35.89%	55	0.24%	16	0.07%	5	0.02%	6,300	27.89%	22,588
Columbus	11,148	77.41%	3,184	22.11%	51	0.35%	9	0.06%	9	0.06%	7,964	55.30%	14,401
Craven	7,553	55.77%	5,881	43.42%	70	0.52%	28	0.21%	11	0.08%	1,672	12.35%	13,543
Cumberland	24,297	62.81%	14,226	36.78%	87	0.22%	54	0.14%	19	0.05%	10,071	26.03%	38,683
Currituck	1,999	67.31%	954	32.12%	14	0.47%	0	0.00%	3	0.10%	1,045	35.19%	2,970
Dare	2,191	56.31%	1,680	43.18%	12	0.31%	6	0.15%	2	0.05%	511	13.13%	3,891
Davidson	17,859	48.46%	18,813	51.05%	132	0.36%	43	0.12%	8	0.02%	-954	-2.59%	36,855
Davie	3,635	42.96%	4,772	56.39%	44	0.52%	7	0.08%	4	0.05%	-1,137	-13.43%	8,462
Duplin	7,696	65.81%	3,912	33.45%	66	0.56%	12	0.10%	8	0.07%	3,784	32.36%	11,694
Durham	22,425	53.99%	18,945	45.61%	90	0.22%	58	0.14%	15	0.04%	3,480	8.38%	41,533
Edgecombe	8,001	61.70%	4,850	37.40%	101	0.78%	9	0.07%	7	0.05%	3,151	24.30%	12,968
Forsyth	39,561	50.20%	38,886	49.34%	211	0.27%	121	0.15%	29	0.04%	675	0.86%	78,808
Franklin	5,405	66.79%	2,630	32.50%	44	0.54%	14	0.17%	0	0.00%	2,775	34.29%	8,093
Gaston	22,878	53.50%	19,727	46.13%	90	0.21%	51	0.12%	18	0.04%	3,151	7.37%	42,764
Gates	2,291	75.66%	722	23.84%	4	0.13%	7	0.23%	4	0.13%	1,569	51.82%	3,028
Graham	1,791	52.31%	1,621	47.34%	8	0.23%	1	0.03%	3	0.09%	170	4.97%	3,424
Granville	5,244	63.59%	2,955	35.84%	34	0.41%	9	0.11%	4	0.05%	2,289	27.75%	8,246
Greene	2,740	66.44%	1,356	32.88%	14	0.34%	9	0.22%	5	0.12%	1,384	33.56%	4,124
Guilford	46,826	50.49%	45,441	49.00%	274	0.30%	157	0.17%	42	0.05%	1,385	1.49%	92,740
Halifax	7,892	59.54%	5,257	39.66%	82	0.62%	12	0.09%	11	0.08%	2,635	19.88%	13,254
Harnett	8,992	60.01%	5,935	39.61%	39	0.26%	10	0.07%	9	0.06%	3,057	20.40%	14,985
Haywood	10,692	64.22%	5,885	35.35%	47	0.28%	19	0.11%	5	0.03%	4,807	28.87%	16,648
Henderson	8,155	42.59%	10,830	56.56%	127	0.66%	27	0.14%	8	0.04%	-2,675	-13.97%	19,147
Hertford	3,986	72.34%	1,517	27.53%	2	0.04%	2	0.04%	3	0.05%	2,469	44.81%	5,510
Hoke	3,186	77.27%	920	22.31%	8	0.19%	6	0.15%	3	0.07%	2,266	54.96%	4,123
Hyde	1,084	63.13%	623	36.28%	7	0.41%	2	0.12%	1	0.06%	461	26.85%	1,717
Iredell	13,295	52.90%	11,573	46.05%	218	0.87%	25	0.10%	20	0.08%	1,722	6.85%	25,131
Jackson	5,223	59.45%	3,536	40.25%	14	0.16%	10	0.11%	2	0.02%	1,687	19.20%	8,785
Johnston	10,301	54.56%	8,511	45.08%	44	0.23%	17	0.09%	6	0.03%	1,790	9.48%	18,879
Jones	2,016	66.95%	948	31.48%	41	1.36%	3	0.10%	3	0.10%	1,068	35.47%	3,011
Lee	5,104	57.80%	3,691	41.80%	19	0.22%	13	0.15%	4	0.05%	1,413	16.00%	8,831
Lenoir	7,650	49.44%	7,715	49.86%	87	0.56%	19	0.12%	3	0.02%	-65	-0.42%	15,474
Lincoln	9,462	58.37%	6,682	41.22%	48	0.30%	15	0.09%	3	0.02%	2,780	17.15%	16,210
Macon	4,403	54.26%	3,673	45.26%	25	0.31%	10	0.12%	4	0.05%	730	9.00%	8,115
Madison	3,433	58.24%	2,446	41.49%	6	0.10%	2	0.03%	8	0.14%	987	16.75%	5,895
Martin	4,518	69.75%	1,931	29.81%	21	0.32%	4	0.06%	3	0.05%	2,587	39.94%	6,477
McDowell	6,246	58.12%	4,450	41.41%	37	0.34%	6	0.06%	7	0.07%	1,796	16.71%	10,746
Mecklenburg	63,198	50.40%	61,715	49.21%	211	0.17%	210	0.17%	65	0.05%	1,483	1.19%	125,399
Mitchell	2,031	35.14%	3,728	64.50%	14	0.24%	3	0.05%	4	0.07%	-1,697	-29.36%	5,780
Montgomery	4,308	59.74%	2,872	39.83%	18	0.25%	6	0.08%	7	0.10%	1,436	19.91%	7,211
Moore	7,373	49.09%	7,577	50.45%	42	0.28%	24	0.16%	4	0.03%	-204	-1.36%	15,020
Nash	8,937	50.73%	8,477	48.12%	176	1.00%	19	0.11%	7	0.04%	460	2.61%	17,616
New Hanover	14,504	50.93%	13,687	48.06%	208	0.73%	58	0.20%	20	0.07%	817	2.87%	28,477
Northampton	5,118	80.23%	1,238	19.41%	18	0.28%	2	0.03%	3	0.05%	3,880	60.82%	6,379
Onslow	7,954	56.94%	5,953	42.61%	38	0.27%	17	0.12%	8	0.06%	2,001	14.33%	13,970
Orange	15,755	62.46%	9,302	36.87%	55	0.22%	99	0.39%	15	0.06%	6,453	25.59%	25,226
Pamlico	2,113	65.85%	1,068	33.28%	19	0.59%	6	0.19%	3	0.09%	1,045	32.57%	3,209
Pasquotank	4,302	61.49%	2,651	37.89%	35	0.50%	6	0.09%	2	0.03%	1,651	23.60%	6,996
Pender	4,422	67.65%	2,063	31.56%	39	0.60%	6	0.09%	7	0.11%	2,359	36.09%	6,537
Perquimans	1,666	64.57%	909	35.23%	3	0.12%	2	0.08%	0	0.00%	757	29.34%	2,580
Person	3,977	56.55%	3,038	43.20%	15	0.21%	1	0.01%	2	0.03%	939	13.35%	7,033
Pitt	11,636	54.66%	9,532	44.78%	66	0.31%	39	0.18%	15	0.07%	2,104	9.88%	21,288
Polk	3,155	54.28%	2,605	44.82%	48	0.83%	4	0.07%	0	0.00%	550	9.46%	5,812
Randolph	12,714	46.75%	14,337	52.72%	107	0.39%	34	0.13%	5	0.02%	-1,623	-5.97%	27,197
Richmond	8,793	75.39%	2,848	24.42%	17	0.15%	6	0.05%	0	0.00%	5,945	50.97%	11,664
Robeson	20,695	80.53%	4,907	19.09%	54	0.21%	9	0.04%	34	0.13%	15,788	61.44%	25,699
Rockingham	13,413	58.65%	9,362	40.93%	67	0.29%	18	0.08%	11	0.05%	4,051	17.72%	22,871
Rowan	15,363	50.82%	14,644	48.44%	183	0.61%	25	0.08%	14	0.05%	719	2.38%	30,229
Rutherford	10,361	60.52%	6,718	39.24%	29	0.17%	10	0.06%	3	0.02%	3,643	21.28%	17,121
Sampson	8,869	55.77%	6,968	43.82%	28	0.18%	23	0.14%	14	0.09%	1,901	11.95%	15,902
Scotland	4,430	69.39%	1,932	30.26%	16	0.25%	3	0.05%	3	0.05%	2,498	39.13%	6,384
Stanly	9,262	50.93%	8,845	48.63%	61	0.34%	12	0.07%	7	0.04%	417	2.30%	18,187
Stokes	6,647	52.29%	6,029	47.43%	29	0.23%	1	0.01%	5	0.04%	618	4.86%	12,711
Surry	10,024	57.31%	7,403	42.33%	46	0.26%	15	0.09%	2	0.01%	2,621	14.98%	17,490
Swain	2,151	57.04%	1,608	42.64%	7	0.19%	3	0.08%	2	0.05%	543	14.40%	3,771
Transylvania	4,636	52.74%	4,089	46.51%	47	0.53%	15	0.17%	4	0.05%	547	6.23%	8,791
Tyrrell	900	68.97%	403	30.88%	2	0.15%	0	0.00%	0	0.00%	497	38.09%	1,305
Union	10,578	62.81%	6,184	36.72%	50	0.30%	18	0.11%	10	0.06%	4,394	26.09%	16,840
Vance	5,620	59.40%	3,813	40.30%	19	0.20%	7	0.07%	2	0.02%	1,807	19.10%	9,461
Wake	44,005	49.57%	44,291	49.89%	182	0.21%	280	0.32%	17	0.02%	-286	-0.32%	88,775
Warren	3,185	68.72%	1,427	30.79%	15	0.32%	4	0.09%	4	0.09%	1,758	37.93%	4,635
Washington	2,840	65.12%	1,486	34.07%	29	0.66%	3	0.07%	3	0.07%	1,354	31.05%	4,361
Watauga	5,358	49.53%	5,400	49.92%	38	0.35%	17	0.16%	4	0.04%	-42	-0.39%	10,817
Wayne	9,265	48.78%	9,607	50.58%	103	0.54%	9	0.05%	9	0.05%	-342	-1.80%	18,993
Wilkes	10,176	46.20%	11,768	53.43%	55	0.25%	14	0.06%	11	0.05%	-1,592	-7.23%	22,024
Wilson	8,209	54.42%	6,795	45.05%	62	0.41%	12	0.08%	6	0.04%	1,414	9.37%	15,084
Yadkin	4,497	42.96%	5,916	56.52%	48	0.46%	5	0.05%	2	0.02%	-1,419	-13.56%	10,468
Yancey	3,932	59.14%	2,688	40.43%	19	0.29%	7	0.11%	3	0.05%	1,244	18.71%	6,649
Totals	927,365	55.27%	741,960	44.22%	5,607	0.33%	2,219	0.13%	755	0.04%	185,405	11.05%	1,677,906

==== Counties that flipped from Republican to Democratic ====
- Anson
- Bertie
- Bladen
- Caswell
- Clay
- Durham
- Edgecombe
- Gates
- Halifax
- Hertford
- Hoke
- Rowan
- Caldwell
- Alexander
- Nash
- Richmond
- Robeson
- Tyrell
- Warren
- Washington
- Wayne
- Gaston
- Polk
- Ashe
- Stokes
- New Hanover
- Stanly
- Cherokee
- Iredell
- Graham
- McDowell
- Transylvania
- Alamance
- Onslow
- Guilford
- Lincoln
- Carteret
- Macon
- Beaufort
- Dare
- Surry
- Burke
- Craven
- Forsyth
- Johnston
- Buncombe
- Wilson
- Mecklenburg
- Pitt
- Rutherford
- Cumberland
- Rockingham
- Alleghany
- Union
- Lee
- Sampson
- Cleveland
- Brunswick
- Montgomery
- Jackson
- Currituck
- Yancey
- Harnett
- Madison
- Pasquotank
- Person
- Greene
- Vance
- Perquimans
- Chatham
- Haywood
- Swain
- Duplin
- Pamlico
- Camden
- Chowan
- Hyde
- Franklin
- Jones
- Granville
- Pender
- Columbus
- Martin
- Scotland

=== By congressional district ===
Carter won all of North Carolina's districts, two of which elected Republicans in the U.S. House of Representatives.

District	Carter	Ford	Representative
1st	60.1%	39.9%	Walter B. Jones Sr.
2nd	61.1%	38.9%	Lawrence H. Fountain
3rd	58.7%	41.3%	Charles Orville Whitley
4th	51.1%	48.9%	Ike Franklin Andrews
5th	50.7%	49.3%	Stephen L. Neal
6th	53.5%	46.5%	L. Richardson Preyer
7th	66.7%	33.3%	Charlie Rose
8th	55.0%	45.0%	Bill Hefner
9th	51.8%	48.2%	James G. Martin
10th	54.3%	45.7%	Jim Broyhill
11th	54.3%	45.7%	V. Lamar Gudger

== Works cited ==
- Black, Earl; Black, Merle (1992). The Vital South: How Presidents Are Elected. Harvard University Press. ISBN 0674941306.
