= Gossard Channel =

Gossard Channel (66°5′S 101°13′E) is a narrow channel extending in an east–west direction between the Mariner Islands and Booth Peninsula in the central portion of the Highjump Archipelago, Antarctica. It was mapped from air photos taken by U.S. Navy Operation Highjump, 1946–47, and named by the Advisory Committee on Antarctic Names for G.C. Gossard, Jr., an air crewman on Operation Highjump photographic flights in this area and other coastal areas between 14°E and 164°E.
