= Fuller Island =

Island in Antarctica

- Location within Antarctica

Geography
- Location: Antarctica
- Coordinates: 66°12′S 101°0′E
- Length: 7 km (4.3 mi)
- Width: 3 km (1.9 mi)

Administration
- Administered under the Antarctic Treaty System

Demographics
- Population: Uninhabited

Fuller Island is an island in the Highjump Archipelago, 7 kilometres (4 nmi) long and 3 kilometres (1.5 nmi) wide, lying 4 kilometres (2 nmi) south of Thomas Island on the south side of Cacapon Inlet. In 1946, it was mapped from the air photos taken by U.S. Navy Operation Highjump. It was named by the Advisory Committee on Antarctic Names for H.F. Fuller, an air crewman on the Operation Highjump seaplane commanded by D.E. Bunger which landed on this area in February 1947.

== See also ==
- List of antarctic and sub-antarctic islands
