= Cacapon Inlet =

Cacapon Inlet (66°10′S 101°0′E) is an inlet about 2 nautical miles (4 km) wide and 9 nautical miles (17 km) long, lying between Thomas Island and Fuller Island in the Highjump Archipelago. The inlet is bounded on the west by Edisto Ice Tongue and on the east by the coast of Antarctica. It was mapped from aerial photographs taken by U.S. Navy Operation Highjump in February 1947, and named by the Advisory Committee on Antarctic Names after USS Cacapon, a tanker in the Western Task Group of Operation Highjump, 1946–47.
