= Miles Island =

Island in Antarctica

- Location within Antarctica

Geography
- Location: Antarctica
- Coordinates: 66°4′S 101°15′E

Administration
- Administered under the Antarctic Treaty System

Demographics
- Population: Uninhabited

Miles Island is a rocky island six kilometres (three nautical miles) long, lying just north of Booth Peninsula in the Mariner Islands, Antarctica. It was mapped from air photos taken by U.S. Navy Operation Highjump in 1946–1947, and was named by the Advisory Committee on Antarctic Names for R.A. Miles, an air crewman on Operation Highjump photographic flights in this area and other coastal areas between 14° and 164° East longitude.

== See also ==
- List of Antarctic and sub-Antarctic islands
