= Dieglman Island =

Island in the Antarctic

- Location within Antarctica

Geography
- Location: Antarctica
- Coordinates: 66°0′S 100°46′E
- Archipelago: Highjump Archipelago

Administration
- Administered under the Antarctic Treaty System

Demographics
- Population: Uninhabited

Dieglman Island is an island about 7 kilometres (4 nmi) long that is largely ice covered but has numerous rock outcrops, lying on the northwest side of Edisto Channel in the Highjump Archipelago. First mapped from air photos taken by U.S. Navy Operation Highjump, 1946–47, and named the "Dieglman Islets", subsequent Soviet expeditions (1956–57) mapped the feature as one island with numerous outcrops. The name has been altered by the Advisory Committee on Antarctic Names (US-ACAN) to apply to the single island. Named by US-ACAN for E.D. Dieglman, an air crewman on U.S. Navy Operation Highjump photographic flights in this area in 1946–47.

== See also ==
- List of antarctic and sub-antarctic islands
