= Cape Hatteras National Seashore =

National seashore in North Carolina, US

- IUCN category V (protected landscape/seascape)
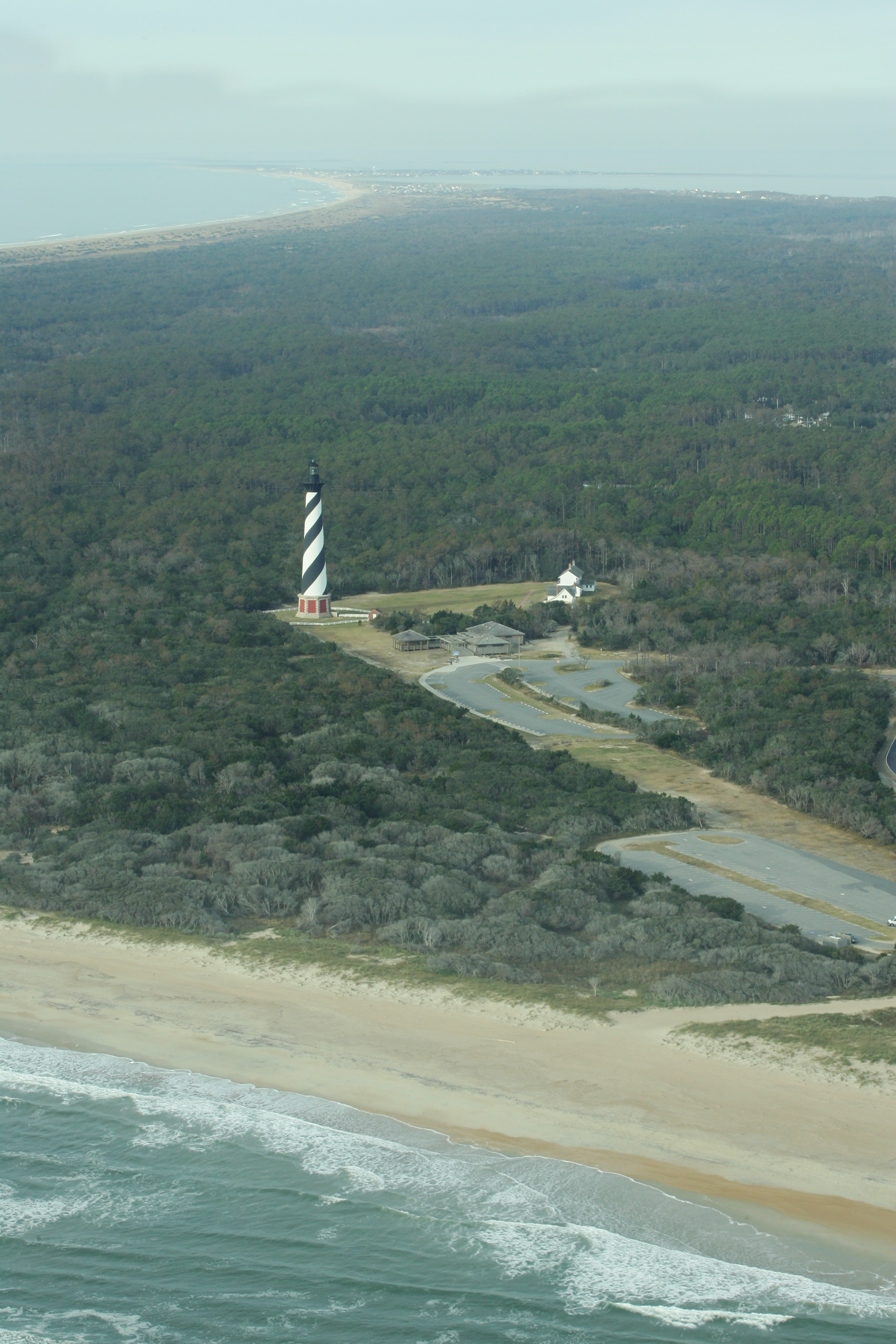
- Aerial view of the lighthouse

- Location within North Carolina Location within the United States
- Location: Outer Banks, Dare County & Hyde County, North Carolina, USA
- Nearest city: Nags Head, North Carolina
- Coordinates: 35°18′13″N 75°30′41″W
- Area: 30,351 acres (122.83 km^{2})
- Established: January 12, 1953
- Visitors: 2,862,844 (in 2022)
- Governing body: National Park Service
- Website: Cape Hatteras National Seashore

Cape Hatteras National Seashore is a United States national seashore which preserves the portion of the Outer Banks of North Carolina from Bodie Island to Ocracoke Island, stretching over 70 miles (110 km), and is managed by the National Park Service. Included within this section of barrier islands along N.C. 12, but outside the national seashore boundaries, are Pea Island National Wildlife Refuge and several communities, such as Rodanthe, Buxton, and Ocracoke. Cape Hatteras is a combination of natural and cultural resources and provides a wide variety of recreational opportunities, including fishing and surfing.

Once dubbed the "Graveyard of the Atlantic" for its treacherous currents, shoals, and storms, Cape Hatteras has a significant amount of history relating to shipwrecks, lighthouses, and the US Lifesaving Service. The islands also provide a variety of habitats and are a valuable wintering area for migrating waterfowl.

== Administrative history ==
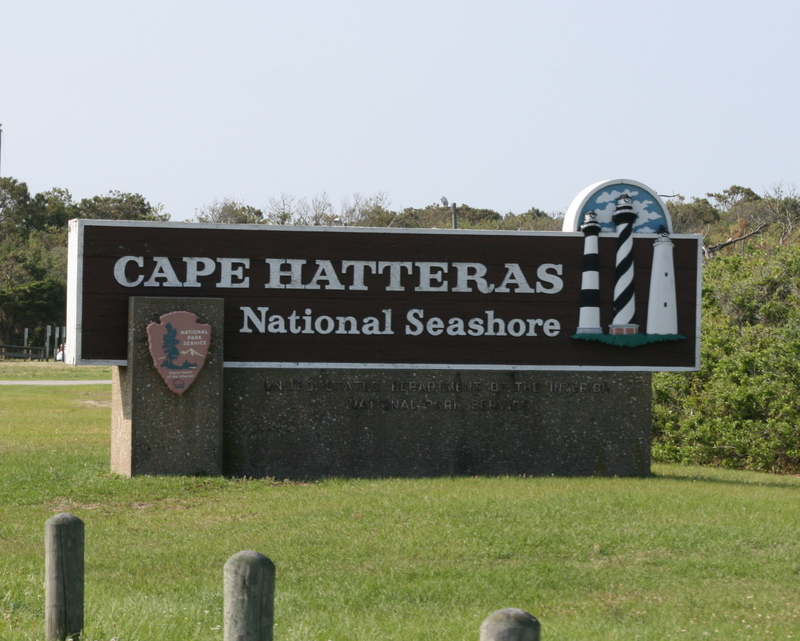
Cape Hatteras National Seashore welcome sign

Congress authorized Cape Hatteras National Seashore on August 17, 1937. The funds to purchase much of the land for Cape Hatteras National Seashore were donated by multi-millionaire philanthropist Paul Mellon. On June 29, 1940, the name of the park was changed by the U.S. Congress to Cape Hatteras National Seashore Recreational Area. The name change was done to accommodate hunting interests, which at that time was a unique allowance for a National Park Service managed entity. The park was officially established as the first national seashore on January 12, 1953, and dedicated on April 24, 1958, and is currently co-managed with two other Outer Banks parks, Wright Brothers National Memorial in Kill Devil Hills and Fort Raleigh National Historic Site on Roanoke Island. It is headquartered at Fort Raleigh.

== Ecology ==
According to the A. W. Kuchler U.S. potential natural vegetation types, Cape Hatteras National Seashore, North Carolina would have a dominant vegetation type of Live oak/Sea Oats Uniola paniculata (90) with a dominant vegetation form of Coastal Prairie (20).

Rodanthe has one of the highest rates of beach erosion on the Outer Banks.

== Visitor centers ==
There are three visitor centers, each located on a barrier island. The visitor centers offer information about the Cape Hatteras National Seashore, ranger programs, and a bookstore.

- The Bodie Island Visitor Center is located in the north, adjacent to the Bodie Island Lighthouse, which is open for tours seasonally.
- The Hatteras Island Visitor Center and Museum of the Sea is located in the Cape Hatteras Light keeper's quarters, in Buxton, North Carolina. Exhibits include the history, maritime heritage, and natural history of the Outer Banks and the lighthouse.
- Ocracoke Island Visitor Center is located in Ocracoke, North Carolina near the Ocracoke Lighthouse.¨¨

== Beach conservation ==
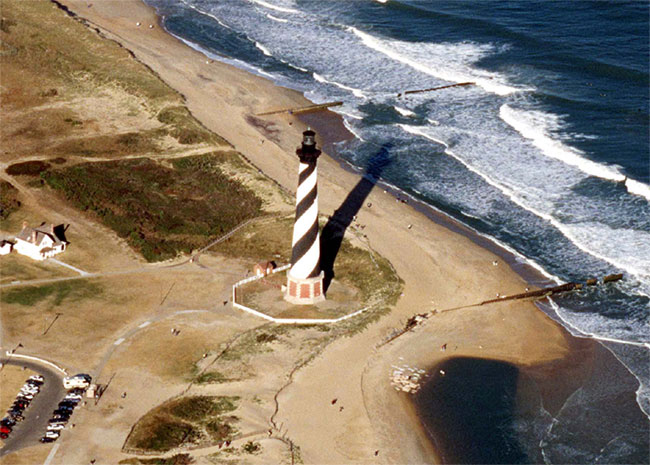
Cape Hatteras Light, prior to its move in 1999

In October 2007, Defenders of Wildlife, along with the National Audubon Society, sued the National Park Service at Cape Hatteras National Seashore for not properly protecting shorebird and sea turtle species that nest on the beaches of the Park.

The Park Service was found not to comply with an executive order requiring the establishment of policies and procedures regarding off-road vehicle (ORV) use on the National Seashore, failing to implement management plans to adequately protect the shorebirds and sea turtles nesting in the park. The Defenders of Wildlife have claimed that the use of ORVs on parklands has degraded the habitat used by the nesting birds, many of which are also federally protected species.

Many of the beaches and beach access points were placed off-limits to ORV use during the months when the birds are nesting. This became a contentious issue among some residents and users of Hatteras Island as ORV access is considered by some to be an important part of regional culture and economics, despite a 2008 study that found that only 3-4% of annual visitors to the National Seashore are ORV users.

In January 2012, the National Park Service instituted its new, and final, ORV management plan. Twenty-eight of the seashore's 67 miles are set aside as year-round ORV routes, with only 26 miles designated as year-round vehicle-free areas for pedestrians, families, and wildlife. The remaining 13 miles of seashore are seasonally open to ORVs. For instance, during the first week of July 2012, while less than 20 miles of the beaches were accessible by ORVs, an additional 31.6 miles were open to pedestrians, meaning 78% of the Seashore was open to visitors in some form. The plan also proposes new parking facilities, ORV ramps, and water shuttles to increase visitor access to beaches.

== Climate ==
According to the Trewartha climate classification system, Cape Hatteras National Seashore, North Carolina, has a humid subtropical climate with hot and humid summers, cool winters, and year-around precipitation (Cfak). Cfak climates are characterized by all months having an average mean temperature > 32.0 °F (> 0.0 °C), at least eight months with an average mean temperature ≥ 50.0 °F (≥ 10.0 °C), at least one month with an average mean temperature ≥ 71.6 °F (≥ 22.0 °C), and no significant precipitation difference between seasons. During the summer months in Cape Hatteras National Seashore, a cooling afternoon sea breeze is present on most days, but episodes of extreme heat and humidity can occur with heat index values ≥ 100 °F (≥ 38 °C). Cape Hatteras National Seashore is prone to hurricane strikes, particularly during the Atlantic hurricane season, which extends from June 1 through November 30, sharply peaking from late August through September. During the winter months, episodes of cold and wind can occur with wind chill values < 15 °F (< -9 °C). The plant hardiness zone in Cape Hatteras National Seashore is 8b with an average annual extreme minimum air temperature of 19.6 °F (-6.9 °C). The average seasonal (Dec-Mar) snowfall total is < 2 inches (< 5 cm), and the average annual peak in nor'easter activity is in February.

Climate data for Cape Hatteras National Seashore, NC (1981-2010 Averages)
Month	Jan	Feb	Mar	Apr	May	Jun	Jul	Aug	Sep	Oct	Nov	Dec	Year
Mean daily maximum °F (°C)	52.4 (11.3)	54.0 (12.2)	58.8 (14.9)	66.5 (19.2)	73.8 (23.2)	81.1 (27.3)	84.7 (29.3)	84.2 (29.0)	80.4 (26.9)	72.5 (22.5)	64.2 (17.9)	56.4 (13.6)	69.2 (20.7)
Daily mean °F (°C)	45.7 (7.6)	47.1 (8.4)	51.9 (11.1)	59.8 (15.4)	67.5 (19.7)	75.5 (24.2)	79.5 (26.4)	79.0 (26.1)	75.1 (23.9)	66.5 (19.2)	58.0 (14.4)	49.8 (9.9)	63.0 (17.2)
Mean daily minimum °F (°C)	38.9 (3.8)	40.3 (4.6)	45.0 (7.2)	53.1 (11.7)	61.3 (16.3)	70.0 (21.1)	74.2 (23.4)	73.8 (23.2)	69.7 (20.9)	60.6 (15.9)	51.8 (11.0)	43.2 (6.2)	56.9 (13.8)
Average precipitation inches (mm)	5.14 (131)	3.91 (99)	4.66 (118)	3.84 (98)	3.62 (92)	4.01 (102)	4.87 (124)	6.79 (172)	6.31 (160)	5.12 (130)	4.82 (122)	4.17 (106)	57.26 (1,454)
Average relative humidity (%)	72.3	71.9	70.5	70.5	73.7	76.8	78.7	77.3	74.9	72.0	73.8	72.2	73.7
Average dew point °F (°C)	37.3 (2.9)	38.5 (3.6)	42.6 (5.9)	50.2 (10.1)	58.8 (14.9)	67.7 (19.8)	72.3 (22.4)	71.3 (21.8)	66.6 (19.2)	57.2 (14.0)	49.7 (9.8)	41.2 (5.1)	54.5 (12.5)
Source: PRISM

Climate data for Cape Hatteras, NC Ocean Water Temperature (3 SE Cape Hatteras National Seashore)
Month	Jan	Feb	Mar	Apr	May	Jun	Jul	Aug	Sep	Oct	Nov	Dec	Year
Daily mean °F (°C)	49 (9)	46 (8)	52 (11)	59 (15)	68 (20)	74 (23)	78 (26)	80 (27)	77 (25)	70 (21)	58 (14)	55 (13)	64 (18)
Source: NOAA

== See also ==
- Hatteras Weather Bureau Station
