= Ocracoke Historic District =

Historic district in North Carolina, United States

- U.S. National Register of Historic Places
- U.S. Historic district
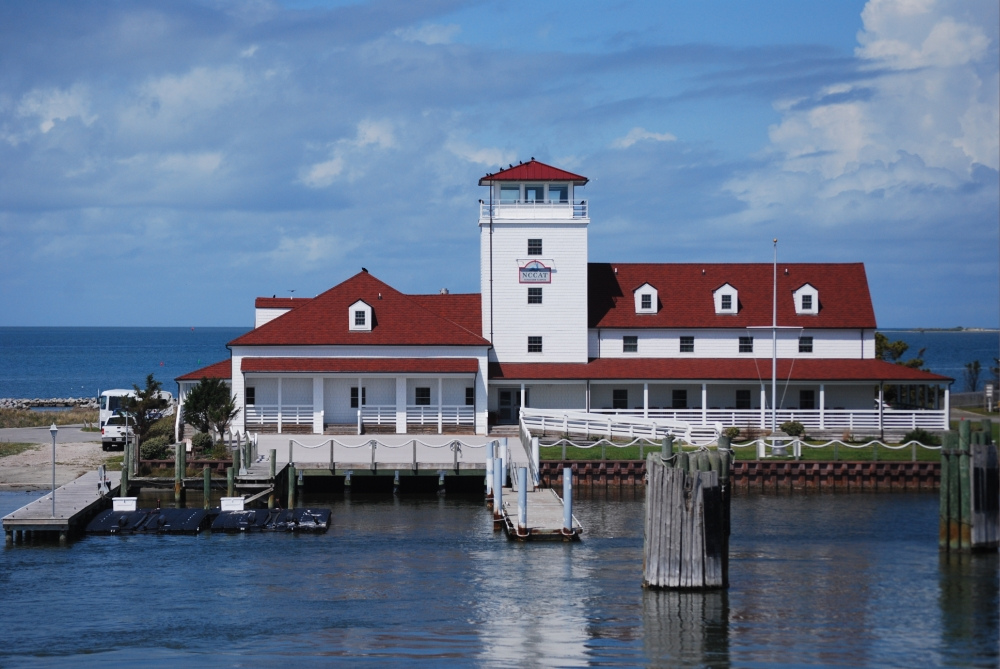
- Ocracoke Coast Guard Station

- Location within North Carolina Location within the United States
- Location: SW tip of Ocracoke Island, around Silver Lake, Ocracoke, North Carolina
- Coordinates: 35°6′53″N 75°59′2″W
- Area: 200 acres (81 ha)
- Built: 1823
- Architect: Multiple
- Architectural style: Bungalow/craftsman, Shingle Style, Vernacular Late Victorian
- NRHP reference No.: 90001465
- Added to NRHP: September 28, 1990

Ocracoke Historic District is a national historic district located at Ocracoke, Hyde County, North Carolina. The district encompasses 228 contributing buildings, 15 contributing sites, and 4 contributing structures on Ocracoke Island in Ocracoke village. The district includes notable examples of Late Victorian, Shingle Style, Bungalow / American Craftsman, and Coastal Cottage style architecture dating from about 1823 to 1959. A number of the houses were constructed from salvaged ship timbers. Located in the district is the Ocracoke Light Station. Other notable contributing resources include the Simon and Louisa Howard House (c. 1840), the Kugler Cottage (c. 1850), Tolson-Rondthaler House (c. 1860), Simon and Sarah Garrish House (1888), Spencer Bungalow (1937), Benjamin Fulcher House, William Charles Thomas House (1899), Styron Store (1920s), Willis Store and Fish House (c. 1930), Coast Guard Station and British Cemetery, the United Methodist Church, Assembly of God Church, the Island Inn (1901), and Berkley Manor and Berkley Castle.

It was added to the National Register of Historic Places in 1990.
