= HMT Bedfordshire =

Armed naval trawler sunk during World War II

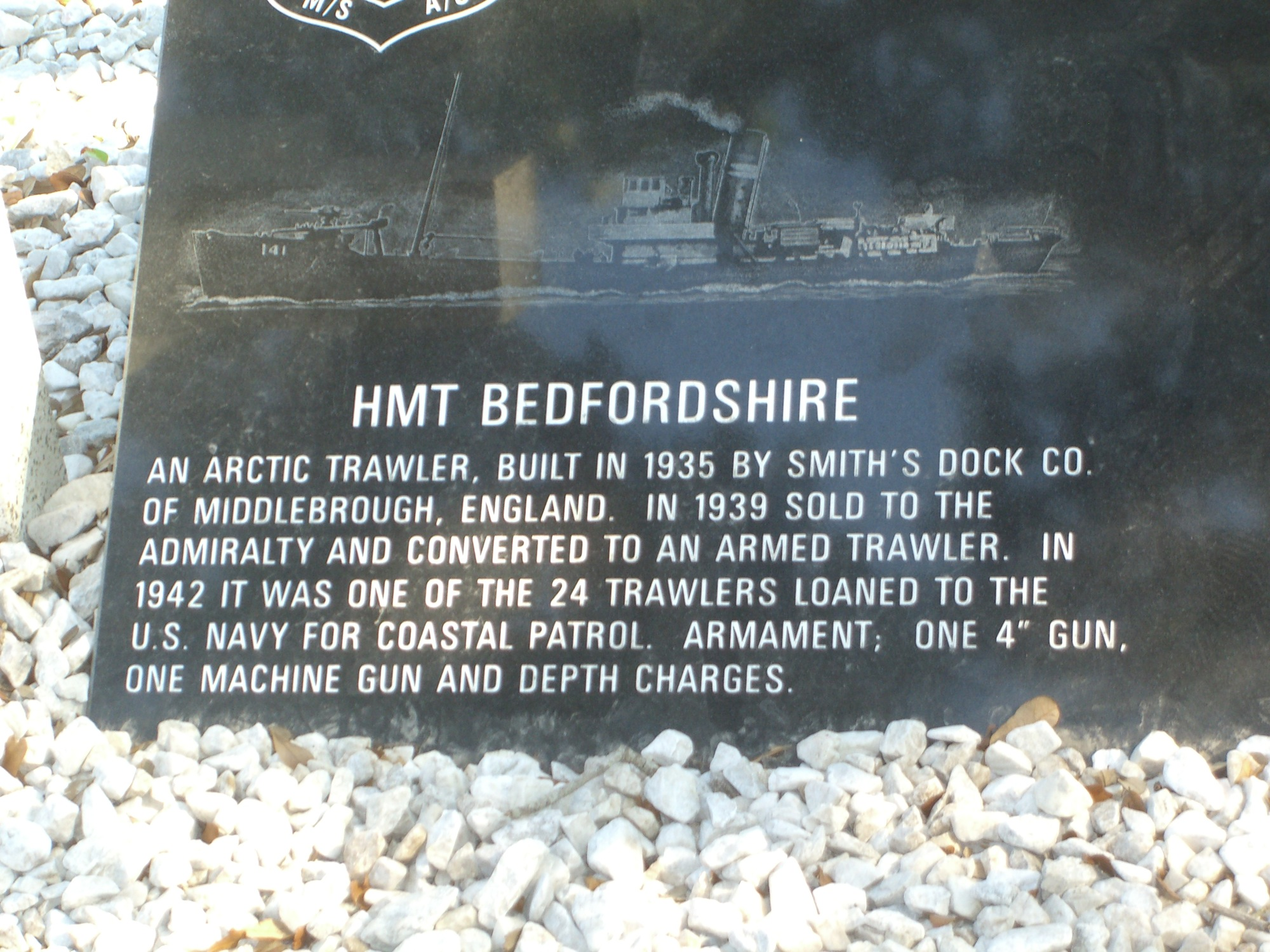
- Bedfordshire as seen in a memorial plaque

History

United Kingdom
- Name: HMT Bedfordshire
- Namesake: Bedfordshire, England
- Builder: Smith's Dock Company
- Launched: 17 July 1935
- Completed: August 1935
- Acquired: August 1939
- Fate: Sunk on 11 May 1942

General characteristics
- Tonnage: 443 GRT
- Length: 162.3 ft (49.5 m)
- Beam: 26.7 ft (8.1 m)
- Propulsion: 3-cylinder triple expansion engine
- Sensors & processing systems: ASDIC
- Armament: 1 × BL 4-inch Mk VII naval gun; 1 × machine gun; depth charges
- HMT Bedfordshire (shipwreck and remains)
- U.S. National Register of Historic Places
- Nearest city: Beaufort, North Carolina
- MPS: World War II Shipwrecks along the East Coast and Gulf of Mexico MPS
- NRHP reference No.: 15000421
- Added to NRHP: 31 July 2015

HMT Bedfordshire (FY141) was an armed naval trawler in the service of the Royal Naval Patrol Service during World War II. Transferred to the East Coast of the United States to assist the United States Navy with anti-submarine patrols, she was staffed by a British and Canadian crew. Bedfordshire was sunk by the German submarine U-558 on 11 May 1942 off the coast of Ocracoke Island in the Outer Banks of North Carolina, with the loss of all hands.

== Construction ==
Bedfordshire was built as a commercial fishing trawler by Smith's Dock Company of South Bank, North Yorkshire, England. Launched at Teesside on 17 July 1935, she was completed in August 1935 and turned over to her owners, Bedfordshire Fishing Company of Grimsby, managed by H. Markham Cook Ltd. She carried the fishing number GY196. Bedfordshire was 162.3 feet (49.5 m) long, with a 26.7-foot (8.1 m) beam.

The Admiralty acquired Bedfordshire for anti-submarine duty in August 1939. Converted for service as a naval trawler, she was armed with a BL 4-inch Mk VII naval gun, machine guns, and depth charges.

== Operational history ==
=== Britain ===
Following completion of her conversion in December 1940, HMT Bedfordshire undertook anti-submarine patrols and escort duty off the southwest coast of England and in the Bristol Channel. She served in this capacity throughout 1941 and early 1942.

=== United States ===
Following Nazi Germany's declaration of war against the United States on 11 December 1941, German U-boats quickly became a deadly threat on the East Coast. The United States Navy was ill-prepared to defend against submarine warfare, and U-boats found it easy to pick off commercial shipping vessels, which travelled unescorted. The onslaught began with Operation Drumbeat when 35 Allied ships were sunk by U-boats off the American coast in January 1942.

In March 1942, the Royal Navy sent the HMT Bedfordshire, and a further 24 converted trawlers, to assist the United States Navy with anti-submarine patrols along the East Coast. Bedfordshire, commanded by Lieutenant Russell Bransby Davis, RNR, was assigned to the Fifth Naval District, headquartered at Naval Station Norfolk. She operated out of Morehead City, North Carolina, primarily in sectors two and three, where she patrolled the waters surrounding the Outer Banks while U-boats continued to terrorize local shipping.

On 16 April 1942, Bedfordshire along with HMT Lady Elsa, HMS Tourmaline, and USS Roper conducted patrols in sector two. Bedfordshire and Tourmaline assisted USS Stringham in the search for survivors of a sunken tanker in sector two on 17 April.

On 18 April, Bedfordshire searched for survivors of U-85, the first U-boat sunk by the US Navy off the East Coast. For the next several days Bedfordshire stood guard duty over a concerted attempt to salvage U-85. The effort was ultimately unsuccessful and the attempt was abandoned on 22 April. The remains of U-85 lie at a depth of less than 100 feet (30 m) in the waters off Bodie Island Lighthouse; its Enigma machine was recovered in 2001.

The remainder of April was spent patrolling in the vicinity of Currituck Island, Hatteras Island, and Lookout Shoals.

On 1 May, a plane reported having spotted a lifeboat some 255 nautical miles (472 km) east of Cape Lookout, and Bedfordshire was sent on a search and rescue mission. She was back on patrol in sector three from 7–9 May, after which she returned to Morehead City.

At noon on 10 May Bedfordshire and HMT St Zeno departed Morehead City to escort a convoy to Hatteras, arriving safely near midnight.

== Sinking ==
On 10 May 1942, Bedfordshire and HMT St Loman were dispatched from Morehead City to search for a U-boat believed to be in the vicinity of Ocracoke Island. The ships were spotted by U-558, commanded by Kapitänleutnant Günther Krech. Believing his sub had been detected, Krech fired on St Loman, which spotted the torpedoes and evaded them. The search continued throughout the night. At 05:40 on 11 May 1942, U-558 fired two torpedoes at the Bedfordshire, the first missed but the second scored a direct hit causing the ship to sink immediately with the loss of all 37 crew. A young stoker named Sam Nutt, who had missed sailing with the ship on her last patrol after being detained at Morehead City by local police, would become the only surviving member of the ship's crew.

=== Bodies ===
On 14 May, the bodies of two seamen were discovered by a Coast Guardsman on the shores of Ocracoke Island. Their British uniforms offered the first indication that Bedfordshire may have met her end, and the U-boat menace was presumed to be responsible. Her fate was confirmed the following year after U-558 was sunk, resulting in the capture of Kapitänleutnant Krech and his ship's diaries.

The bodies found on 14 May were identified as belonging to Sub-Lieutenant Thomas Cunningham and Ordinary Telegraphist Stanley Craig of the Bedfordshire. They were buried in a small plot next to a cemetery in Ocracoke Village. The Royal Navy flag draped over Cunningham's coffin was one of several that he himself had given to a local man less than a month earlier for the funeral ceremonies of British seamen. Shortly thereafter, two additional bodies from the ship washed ashore on Ocracoke. Unidentified, they were also buried in what became known as the Ocracoke Island British Cemetery.

On nearby Hatteras Island, the body of a fifth British seaman, unidentifiable but presumed to be from Bedfordshire, washed ashore on 21 May. The month prior, the body of another British sailor from the sunken merchant ship San Delfino had been buried on Hatteras; the Bedfordshire sailor's body was interred in an adjacent plot, resulting in a second British Cemetery, formally known as Cape Hatteras Coast Guard Burial Ground.

In late May or early June, a sixth body, belonging to Seaman Alfred Dryden, washed ashore at Swan Quarter, North Carolina. It was buried in Oak Grove Baptist Cemetery at Creeds, Virginia, with three of the dead from HMT Kingston Ceylonite, sunk by a mine on 15 June 1942, whose bodies washed ashore nearby.

== Commemoration ==
The Ocracoke British Cemetery and Hatteras British Cemetery were leased in 1976 in perpetuity to the British government for as long as the interred bodies remain there. Formal custody is handled by the Commonwealth War Graves Commission, which provides the protocol headstones. Regular maintenance is handled by the US Coast Guard and local residents as a gesture of gratitude and respect to the fallen men and an act of comity to the British government. A Royal Navy flag flies over the cemeteries, and a ceremony is held there each year on 11 May to honour the men of the Bedfordshire. The Commonwealth War Graves Commission also provided headstones for the four British servicemen interred in Creeds, Virginia, including Alfred Dryden of the Bedfordshire.

The crewmen whose bodies were not recovered are honoured by name on the Royal Naval Patrol Service Memorial at Lowestoft.

The wreck of the Bedfordshire was located in 1980 at 34°10′N 76°41′W at a depth of 100 feet (30 m). The site is a protected war grave under the Protection of Military Remains Act 1986. In 2008 and 2009 the National Oceanic and Atmospheric Administration led an expedition to document the condition of ships sunk during the Battle of the Atlantic. At the request of the British government, the Bedfordshire wreck site was surveyed by the expedition in 2009.

On 31 July 2015, the Bedfordshire was listed in the US government's National Register of Historic Places.

== See also ==
- Torpedo Alley (North Carolina)
- Trawlers of the Royal Navy

== Bibliography ==
- Blair, Clay (1996). Hitler's U-Boat War: The Hunters, 1939–1942. Random House. ISBN 0-394-58839-8.
- Conn, Stetson (2000) [1964]. "Chapter IV: The Continental Defense Commands After Pearl Harbor". Guarding the United States and Its Outposts. Seattle: United States Army Center of Military History. ISBN 1-4102-0192-9. Archived from the original on 25 December 2007.
- Hancock, W.K.; Margaret M. Gowing (1949). British War Economy. History of the Second World War. London: Her Majesty's Stationery Office. OCLC 236314.
- Hickam, Homer H. (1996). Torpedo Junction: U-Boat War Off America's East Coast, 1942. Naval Institute Press. ISBN 1-55750-362-1.
- Runyan, Timothy J.; Jan M. Copes (1994). To Die Gallantly: The Battle of the Atlantic. Westview Press. ISBN 0-8133-2332-0.
