= Convoy TAG 5 =

Convoy TAG.5
- Part of World War II
Date	12–16 September 1942
Location	Lesser Antilles, Caribbean Sea
Result	German tactical victory

Belligerents
(Nazi Germany) Germany	Canada; Netherlands; Norway; Panama; United Kingdom; United States

Commanders and leaders
Admiral Karl Dönitz; Kapitänleutnant Günther Krech	

Strength
1 U-boat	17 merchant ships 1 destroyer 2 corvettes 2 submarine chasers 2 minesweepers

Casualties and losses
	2 ships sunk 1 damaged, and then total loss

Convoy TAG 5 was a trade convoy of merchant ships during the second World War. It was the 5th of the numbered TAG Convoys from Trinidad and Aruba to Guantánamo. The convoy was found on 13 September 1942 by U-558. Kapitänleutnant Günther Krech (Knight's Cross of the Iron Cross) destroyed three ships from the convoy in two approaches aboard U-558.

== Ships in the convoy ==
Name	Flag	Tonnage (GRT)	Notes
Alar (1939)	Norway	9,430	Curaçao to Guantanamo Bay Naval Base
Altair (1920)	United States	6,933	Curaçao to Guantanamo Bay Naval Base
Beaconoil (1919)	United Kingdom	6,893	Curaçao to Guantanamo Bay Naval Base; probably this convoy
Cottica (1927)	Netherlands	3,989	
Empire Kangaroo (1919)	United Kingdom	6,219	
Empire Lugard (1941)	United Kingdom	7,241	Sunk by U-558
Examiner (1942)	United States	6,736	
Gulftide (1937)	United States	7,140	
HMCS Halifax	Royal Canadian Navy		Escort 12 Sep – 14 Sep
Henry D Whiton (1921)	United States	4,548	
Hoegh Silverdawn (1940)	Norway	7,715	
Leonatus (1938)	Panama	2,242	
Macabi (1921)	Panama	2,802	
Peter Hurll (1930)	Panama	10,871	
Saintonge (1936)	United Kingdom	9,386	Curaçao to Guantanamo Bay Naval Base
Suriname (1930)	Netherlands	7,915	Sunk by U-558
USS PC-481	United States Navy		Escort 12 Sep – 16 Sep
USS PC-574	United States Navy		Escort 12 Sep – 16 Sep
USS Spry	United States Navy		Escort 12 Sep – 16 Sep
USS Upshur	United States Navy		Escort 12 Sep – 16 Sep
USS YMS-24	United States Navy		Escort 13 Sep – 16 Sep
USS YMS-56	United States Navy		Escort 13 Sep – 16 Sep
Vilja (1928)	Norway	6,672	Torpedoed by U-558 and abandoned, but reboarded and safely arrived in Trinidad damaged. Later declared a total loss.
West Kyska (1918)	United States	5,552	Did not sail

== Bibliography ==
- Hague, Arnold (2000). The Allied Convoy System 1939–1945. ISBN 1-86176-147-3.
- Rohwer, J.; Hummelchen, G. (1992). Chronology of the War at Sea 1939–1945. Naval Institute Press. ISBN 1-55750-105-X.
