= Ocracoke British Cemetery =

Commonwealth War Graves Commission cemetery in the United States

- Commonwealth War Graves Commission; United States Coast Guard
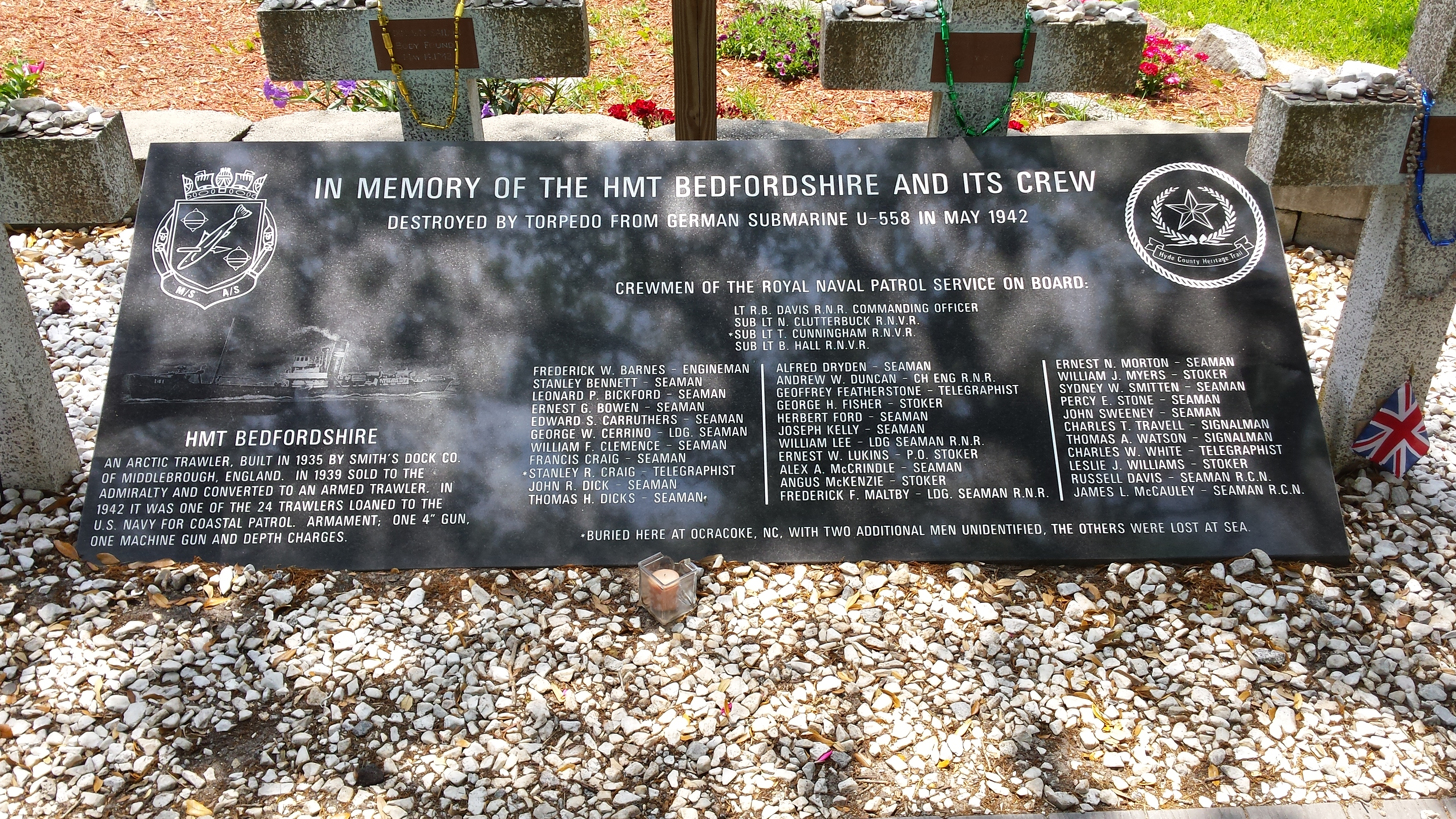
- For Battle of the Atlantic
- Location: 35°7′0″N 75°58′51″W near Ocracoke, North Carolina, United States
- Total burials: 4
- Unknowns: 2

Burials by nation
- United Kingdom; Canada

Burials by war
- World War II

The Ocracoke British Cemetery is a Commonwealth War Graves Commission cemetery located on Ocracoke Island, North Carolina, United States. The cemetery contains the graves of British and Canadian Royal Navy sailors from HMT Bedfordshire, who lost their lives in the Battle of the Atlantic during World War II.

== History ==
The HMT Bedfordshire was sunk by German Kriegsmarine U-558 on May 11, 1942 while she was on anti-U-boat patrol in Torpedo Alley, off the coast of North Carolina. All 37 sailors on board were killed. In the following days, the bodies of four sailors washed ashore on Ocracoke Island and were buried by local residents in community cemetery plots. The four sailors were later reinterred in the current plot, and a memorial was erected to honor all sailors from the Bedfordshire.

A Royal Navy ensign flies permanently over the cemetery, and an annual memorial service is held on May 11 by the British Royal Navy, United States Coast Guard, Royal Canadian Navy, and United States National Park Service to honor the crew. In 1976, the site was leased in perpetuity to the British government.

== Maintenance ==
Formal custody is administered by the Commonwealth War Graves Commission, which provided the official headstones. Regular maintenance is carried out by the United States Coast Guard and local residents as a gesture of gratitude and respect toward the fallen, and as an act of goodwill to the United Kingdom.
