= Mariner Islands =

Island group in Antarctica

- Location within Antarctica

Geography
- Location: Antarctica
- Coordinates: 66°1′S 101°9′E
- Archipelago: Highjump Archipelago

Administration
- Administered under the Antarctic Treaty System

Demographics
- Population: Uninhabited

The Mariner Islands are a group of rocky islands and rocks forming the north-central group of the Highjump Archipelago, bounded by Edisto Channel on the west, Gossard Channel on the south, and Remenchus Glacier on the east. They were mapped from air photos taken by U.S. Navy Operation Highjump, 1946–47, and named by the Advisory Committee on Antarctic Names to commemorate the discovery of a large ice-free region at the west end of the Knox Coast by the crew of a Martin PBM Mariner seaplane commanded by D.E. Bunger. During photographic reconnaissance of this coastal area in January 1947, the aircraft landed on one of the inlets indenting the Bunger Hills and ground-level photographs and water samples were obtained at that time.

== See also ==
- List of antarctic and sub-antarctic islands
