= Currituck Island =

Island in Queen Mary Land, Antarctica

Currituck Island (66°5′S 100°40′E) is an island in Antarctica 7 nautical miles (13 km) long marked by numerous small coves, lying on the northwest side of Edisto Channel in the Highjump Archipelago. It was mapped from air photos taken by U.S. Navy Operation Highjump in February 1947, and named by the Advisory Committee on Antarctic Names in 1956 after the USS Currituck, a seaplane tender and flagship of the western task group of U.S. Navy Operation Highjump, Task Force 68, 1946–47. At that time, the northern portion was thought to be a separate feature and was named "Mohaupt Island," but subsequent Soviet Expeditions (1956–57) found that only one large island exists.

== See also ==
- List of antarctic and sub-antarctic islands
