= William Rockefeller (disambiguation) =

William Rockefeller Jr. was an American financier and co-founder of Standard Oil

William Rockefeller may also refer to:

- William Rockefeller Sr., father of the Standard Oil co-founder
- William Goodsell Rockefeller, son of the Standard Oil co-founder
- SS William Rockefeller, a ship named after the Standard Oil co-founder
- The engineer of a commuter train that derailed in New York City, killing four, in December 2013
