= German submarine U-558 =

German World War II submarine

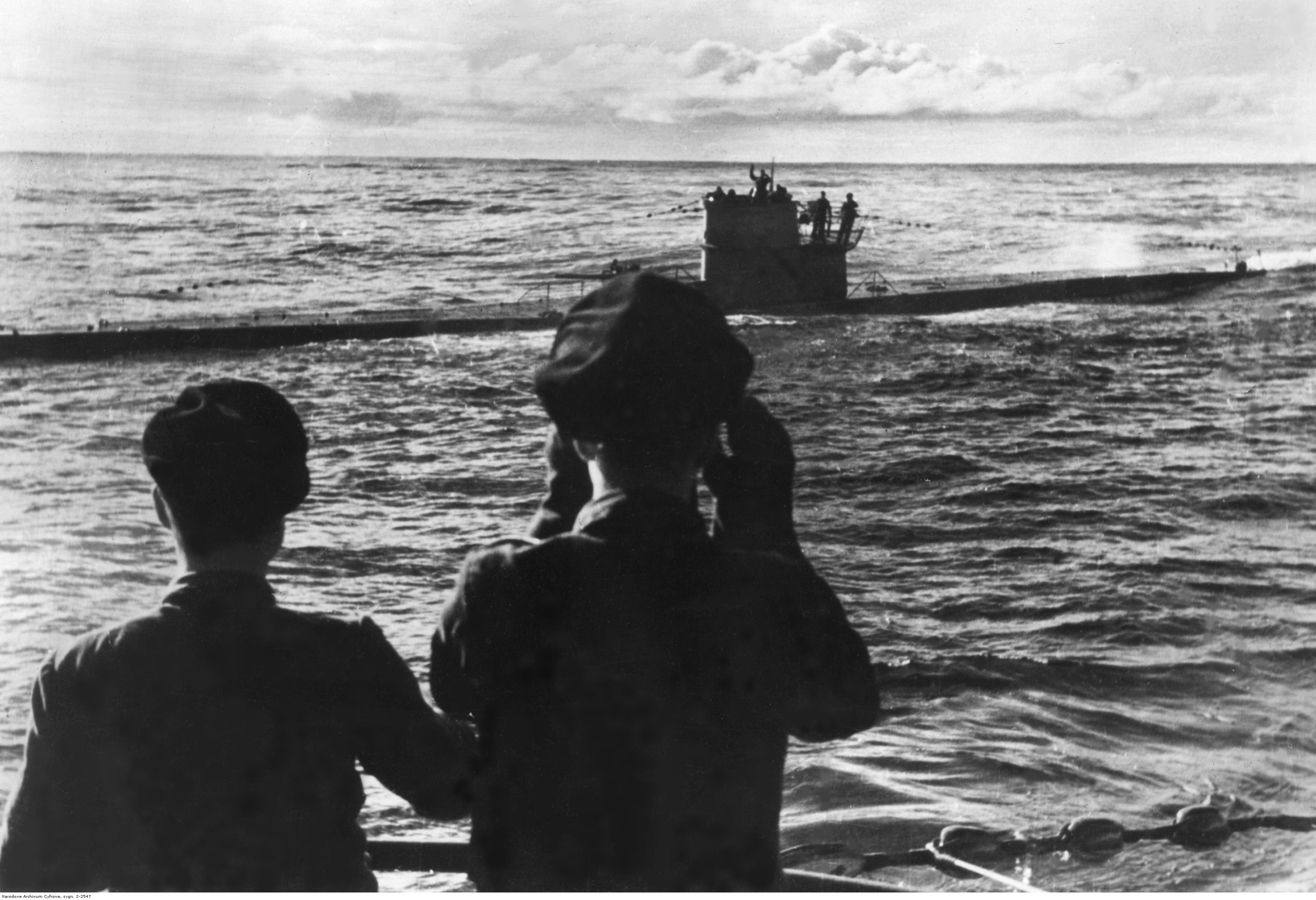
- U-558 in June 1942

History

Nazi Germany
- Name: U-558
- Ordered: 25 September 1939
- Builder: Blohm & Voss, Hamburg
- Yard number: 534
- Laid down: 6 January 1940
- Launched: 23 December 1940
- Commissioned: 20 February 1941
- Fate: Sunk on 20 July 1943

General characteristics
- Class & type: Type VIIC submarine
- Displacement: 769 tonnes (757 long tons) surfaced; 871 t (857 long tons) submerged
- Length: 67.10 m (220 ft 2 in) o/a; 50.50 m (165 ft 8 in) pressure hull
- Beam: 6.20 m (20 ft 4 in) o/a; 4.70 m (15 ft 5 in) pressure hull
- Height: 9.60 m (31 ft 6 in)
- Draught: 4.74 m (15 ft 7 in)
- Installed power: 2,800–3,200 PS (2,100–2,400 kW; 2,800–3,200 bhp) (diesels); 750 PS (550 kW; 740 shp) (electric)
- Propulsion: 2 shafts; 2 × diesel engines; 2 × electric motors
- Speed: 17.7 knots (32.8 km/h; 20.4 mph) surfaced; 7.6 knots (14.1 km/h; 8.7 mph) submerged
- Range: 8,500 nmi (15,700 km; 9,800 mi) at 10 knots (19 km/h; 12 mph) surfaced; 80 nmi (150 km; 92 mi) at 4 knots (7.4 km/h; 4.6 mph) submerged
- Test depth: 230 m (750 ft); Crush depth: 250–295 m (820–968 ft)
- Complement: 4 officers, 40–56 enlisted
- Armament: 5 × 53.3 cm (21 in) torpedo tubes (four bow, one stern); 14 × torpedoes or 26 TMA mines; 1 × 8.8 cm (3.46 in) deck gun (220 rounds); 1 x 2 cm (0.79 in) C/30 AA gun

Service record
- Part of: 1st U-boat Flotilla; 20 February 1941 – 20 July 1943
- Identification codes: M 36 167
- Commanders: Kptlt. Günther Krech; 20 February 1941 – 20 July 1943
- Operations: 10 patrols: 1st patrol: 1 June – 9 July 1941; 2nd patrol: 28 July – 7 August 1941; 3rd patrol: 25 August – 16 September 1941; 4th patrol: 11 – 25 October 1941; 5th patrol: 24 November – 7 December 1941; 6th patrol: 10 February – 11 March 1942; 7th patrol: 12 April – 21 June 1942; 8th patrol: 29 July – 16 October 1942; 9th patrol: 9 January – 29 March 1943; 10th patrol: 8 May – 20 July 1943
- Victories: 17 merchant ships sunk (93,186 GRT); 1 auxiliary warship sunk (913 GRT); 1 merchant ship total loss (6,672 GRT); 2 merchant ships damaged (15,070 GRT)

German submarine U-558 was a Type VIIC U-boat in the service of Nazi Germany's Kriegsmarine during World War II. She sank 18 ships totalling 94,099 GRT before being sunk by bomber aircraft on 20 July 1943.

== Construction and early service life ==
U-558 was laid down on 6 January 1940 at Blohm & Voss in Hamburg, Germany as yard number 534 and launched on 23 December 1940. She was commissioned on 20 February 1941, with Oberleutnant zur See Günther Krech in command.

Her service began with the 1st U-boat Flotilla where she conducted training before moving on to operations, also with the first flotilla, on 1 May 1941.

== Design ==
German Type VIIC submarines were preceded by the shorter Type VIIB submarines. U-558 had a displacement of 769 tonnes (757 long tons) when at the surface and 871 tonnes (857 long tons) while submerged. She had a total length of 67.10 m (220 ft 2 in), a pressure hull length of 50.50 m (165 ft 8 in), a beam of 6.20 m (20 ft 4 in), a height of 9.60 m (31 ft 6 in), and a draught of 4.74 m (15 ft 7 in). The submarine was powered by two Germaniawerft F46 four-stroke, six-cylinder supercharged diesel engines producing a total of 2,800 to 3,200 metric horsepower (2,060 to 2,350 kW; 2,760 to 3,160 shp) for use while surfaced, two Brown, Boveri & Cie GG UB 720/8 double-acting electric motors producing a total of 750 metric horsepower (550 kW; 740 shp) for use while submerged. She had two shafts and two 1.23 m (4 ft) propellers. The boat was capable of operating at depths of up to 230 metres (750 ft).

The submarine had a maximum surface speed of 17.7 knots (32.8 km/h; 20.4 mph) and a maximum submerged speed of 7.6 knots (14.1 km/h; 8.7 mph). When submerged, the boat could operate for 80 nautical miles (150 km; 92 mi) at 4 knots (7.4 km/h; 4.6 mph); when surfaced, she could travel 8,500 nautical miles (15,700 km; 9,800 mi) at 10 knots (19 km/h; 12 mph). U-558 was fitted with five 53.3 cm (21 in) torpedo tubes (four fitted at the bow and one at the stern), fourteen torpedoes, one 8.8 cm (3.46 in) SK C/35 naval gun, 220 rounds, and a 2 cm (0.79 in) C/30 anti-aircraft gun. The boat had a complement of between forty-four and sixty.

== Service history ==
=== First, second and third patrols ===
U-558 departed Kiel on 1 June 1941 and entered the Atlantic via the North Sea and the gap between Iceland and the Faroe Islands with no major encounters, arriving at her new home port of Brest in occupied France on the 28th.

Her second patrol was also relatively uneventful.

The submarine's third patrol, from 25 August to 16 September 1941, became interesting when she came upon the British Convoy OS 4 about 330 miles (530 km) northwest of Fastnet Rock. She torpedoed and sank the Otaio, a 10,298 GRT cargo ship, on 28 August.

=== Fourth and fifth patrols ===
Her fourth patrol, which began on 11 October 1941, first saw action off Ireland when she torpedoed and sank the unescorted Vancouver Island, a Canadian merchant ship of 9,472 GRT, on 15 October. Two days later on 17 October, U-558 was involved in a devastating attack on Convoy SC 48 in the North Atlantic. During the battle, U-558 sank three ships: the 9,552 GRT British merchant steamer W.C. Teagle, and the Norwegian merchant steamers Erviken (which broke in two and sank in three minutes) and Rym, 6,595 and 1,369 GRT respectively U-558 took a hit from a depth charge dropped by a Catalina flying boat, but did not sustain serious damage and continued to shadow the convoy. She returned to Brest on 25 October 1941, having sunk four ships in the 15 days of her fourth patrol.

U-558's fifth patrol began on 24 November 1941. On 2 December, a British aircraft spotted the U-boat attempting to enter the Mediterranean Sea and called for surface support. U-558 took serious damage from depth charges dropped by the two ships that responded. She was able to escape, but had to return to Brest for repairs, arriving 7 December 1941 after only 14 days at sea, having had no success.

=== Sixth and seventh patrols ===
U-558 required significant repairs and remained in port until 10 February 1942, when she embarked on her sixth patrol. On 21 February Convoy ON 67 was spotted, so she moved into position along with five other submarines. Eight of its ships were sunk by the U-boats, another two were left damaged. On 24 February, U-558 torpedoed the 8,009 GRT British tanker Anadara, which escaped. That same day she also torpedoed and sank the 9,432 GRT Norwegian tanker Eidanger and the 5,578 GRT British steamer Inverarder. She returned to Brest on 11 March 1942.

U-558 departed Brest to begin her seventh patrol of the war on 12 April 1942 . On 12 May, she sank the 913 GRT British armed trawler HMT Bedfordshire off the coast of Ocracoke Island, North Carolina, where the ship had been assisting the United States Navy with anti-submarine patrols. Six days later on 18 May, she sank the 1,254 GRT Dutch steamer Fauna. On 21 May she sank the 1,925 GRT Canadian steamer Troisdoc in the Caribbean. Off Jamaica on 23 May, U-558 torpedoed the 7,061 GRT American merchant steamer William Boyce Thompson, but the tanker used evasive maneuvers and reached the safety of Guantanamo Bay, Cuba for repairs. Still in the Caribbean on 25 May, U-558 next attacked the 3,451 GRT American merchant steamer Beatrice. When her torpedo hit the ship but failed to detonate, U-558 surfaced and trained her deck guns on the vessel, which was quickly ordered abandoned, and subsequently sunk. Remaining in the Caribbean, U-558 next torpedoed and sank the 2,622 GRT United States Army transport USAT Jack on 27 May. Her last target during the patrol was the 2,078 GRT Dutch steamer Triton, which she shelled and sank on 2 June about 470 miles (760 km) southeast of Bermuda. U-558 returned to Brest to end her seventh patrol on 21 June 1942, having sunk six ships and damaged one.

=== Eighth, ninth and tenth patrols ===
U-558's eighth patrol began when she left Brest on 29 July 1942. On 25 August, she encountered the 1,987 GRT British steamer Amakura, which had been travelling with Convoy WAT 15 but had fallen behind. U-558 torpedoed and sank her approximately 90 miles (140 km) southeast of Port Morant, Jamaica. U-558 encountered Convoy TAG 5 on 13 September; she torpedoed and sank the 7,241 GRT British cargo ship Empire Lugard and the 7,915 GRT Dutch steamer Suriname. The same day she also hit the convoy's 6,672 GRT Norwegian tanker Vilja, whose crew quickly abandoned ship but were able to reboard after U-558 left the area. Vilja did not sink, but was later deemed a total loss. On 16 September U-558 torpedoed and sank the 2,606 GRT American steamer Commercial Trader about 75 miles (121 km) east of Trinidad. U-558 returned to port on 16 October, having sunk four ships and damaged a fifth.

U-558 remained in port until the end of 1942, and embarked on her ninth war patrol on 9 January 1943. In January she met with the U-109 in order to transfer an officer to their crew, since the commander of U-109 had fallen out with a nervous breakdown. On 23 February, she torpedoed and sank the 9,811 GRT British steam tanker Empire Norseman south of the Azores, which had been travelling with Convoy UC 1 but was drifting unmanned after being torpedoed by U-382 and U-202. She found no other targets during her ninth patrol, which ended when she returned to Brest on 29 March 1943.

Her tenth—and ultimately last—patrol began on 8 May 1943. U-558 ran into difficulty many times during this patrol. At one point, she manoeuvred to attack a large eastbound convoy, but a destroyer harried her into retreat. Off Lisbon on 14 July, a British Wellington bomber from No. 179 Squadron RAF dropped depth charges; U-558 was not hit, and damaged the plane with anti-aircraft fire. Three days later off Porto on 17 July, a British Liberator from 224 Squadron dropped 24 35-pound anti-submarine bombs, but U-558 was able to escape by crash-diving; the plane took damage from anti-aircraft fire and its own malfunctioning bombs.

=== Fate ===
In the Bay of Biscay on 20 July, an American B-24 Liberator from the 19th Antisubmarine Squadron, United States Army Air Forces, called the Sea Hawk dropped depth charges on U-558; the boat was undamaged, and returned fire, shooting down the bomber.

Later the same day, a second Liberator from the 19th Antisubmarine Squadron, 479th Antisubmarine Group, piloted by Charles F. Gallmeier, dropped 7 depth charges on U-558. The sub was severely damaged and unable to dive. The Liberator, her port inner engine taken out by U-558's anti-aircraft flak guns, left the scene and was relieved by a Halifax bomber from 58 Squadron, piloted by Geoffrey R. Sawtell. Although the U-boat was devastated by the previous attack, and the Germans were attempting to scuttle and to abandon the ship, the Halifax attacked U-558 with 8 depth charges. Captain Krech, badly wounded in the spine, and four of his crew miraculously escaped in a raft, and were picked up on 24 July by HMCS Athabaskan.". All other 41 men perished. She sank at position 45°10′N 09°42′W north-west of Spain in the Bay of Biscay.

=== Wolfpacks ===
U-558 took part in nine wolfpacks, namely:

- Bosemüller (28 August – 2 September 1941)
- Seewolf (2 – 12 September 1941)
- Delphin (24 January – 14 February 1943)
- Rochen (16 – 28 February 1943)
- Tümmler (1 – 22 March 1943)
- Oder (17 – 19 May 1943)
- Mosel (19 – 24 May 1943)
- Trutz (1 – 16 June 1943)
- Trutz 1 (16 – 29 June 1943)

== Summary of raiding history ==
Date	Ship Name	Nationality	Tonnage (GRT)	Fate
28 August 1941	Otaio	United Kingdom	10,298	Sunk
15 October 1941	Vancouver Island	Canada	9,472	Sunk
17 October 1941	Erviken	Norway	6,595	Sunk
17 October 1941	Rym	Norway	1,369	Sunk
17 October 1941	W.C. Teagle	United Kingdom	9,552	Sunk
24 February 1942	Anadara	United Kingdom	8,009	Damaged
24 February 1942	Eidanger	Norway	9,432	Sunk
24 February 1942	Inverarder	United Kingdom	5,578	Sunk
12 May 1942	HMT Bedfordshire	Royal Navy	913	Sunk
18 May 1942	Fauna	Netherlands	1,254	Sunk
21 May 1942	Troisdoc	Canada	1,925	Sunk
23 May 1942	William Boyce Thompson	United States	7,061	Damaged
25 May 1942	Beatrice	United States	3,451	Sunk
27 May 1942	USAT Jack	United States Army	2,622	Sunk
2 June 1942	Triton	Netherlands	2,078	Sunk
25 August 1942	Amakura	United Kingdom	1,987	Sunk
13 September 1942	Empire Lugard	United Kingdom	7,241	Sunk
13 September 1942	Suriname	Netherlands	7,915	Sunk
13 September 1942	Vilja	Norway	6,672	Total loss
16 September 1942	Commercial Trader	United States	2,606	Sunk
23 February 1943	Empire Norseman	United Kingdom	9,811	Sunk

== Bibliography ==
- Blair, Clay (1998). Hitler's U-Boat War [Volume 2]: The Hunted 1942–1945. Casell. ISBN 0-304-35261-6.
- Busch, Rainer; Röll, Hans-Joachim (1999). German U-boat commanders of World War II : a biographical dictionary. Translated by Brooks, Geoffrey. London, Annapolis, Md: Greenhill Books, Naval Institute Press. ISBN 1-55750-186-6.
- Busch, Rainer; Röll, Hans-Joachim (1999). Deutsche U-Boot-Verluste von September 1939 bis Mai 1945 [German U-boat losses from September 1939 to May 1945]. Der U-Boot-Krieg (in German). Vol. IV. Hamburg, Berlin, Bonn: Mittler. ISBN 3-8132-0514-2.
- Edwards, Bernard (1996). Dönitz and the Wolf Packs - The U-boats at War. Cassell Military Classics. pp. 54, 56, 57, 75, 85, 86. ISBN 0-304-35203-9.
- Gröner, Erich; Jung, Dieter; Maass, Martin (1991). U-boats and Mine Warfare Vessels. German Warships 1815–1945. Vol. 2. Translated by Thomas, Keith; Magowan, Rachel. London: Conway Maritime Press. ISBN 0-85177-593-4.
