= Edisto Channel =

Edisto Channel (66°5′S 100°50′E) is a marine channel, whose south end is filled by Edisto Ice Tongue. It extends in a northeast–southwest direction between the Taylor Islands and the northwestern islands of the Highjump Archipelago on the west, and the Bunger Hills, Thomas Island, and the remaining islands in the Highjump Archipelago on the east. It was delineated from aerial photographs taken by U.S. Navy Operation Highjump, 1946–47, and was named by the Advisory Committee on Antarctic Names for the USS Edisto, one of the two icebreakers of Operation Windmill, 1947–48, which assisted in establishing astronomical control stations along Wilhelm II Coast, Queen Mary Coast, Knox Coast and Budd Coast.
