= WOVV =

- Ocracoke, North Carolina; United States
- Frequency: 90.1 MHz
- Branding: Ocracoke Community Radio

Programming
- Format: Variety

Ownership
- Owner: Ocracoke Foundation

Technical information
- Facility ID: 173549
- Class: A
- ERP: 650 watts
- HAAT: 19.0 meters
- Transmitter coordinates: 35°6′43.00″N 75°58′38.20″W

Links
- Webcast: WOVV Webstream
- Website: WOVV Online

WOVV (90.1 FM) is a community radio station licensed to Ocracoke, North Carolina, United States. The station, owned by the Ocracoke Community Radio, Inc., airs a variety format of music, news, and local public affairs programming. In addition to its FM signal, the station streams on the internet at wovv.rocks.

== Background ==
Started in 2008 by volunteers intent on bringing community radio to Ocracoke Island, the station was licensed by the FCC on November 10, 2010. Serving part of North Carolina's Outer Banks region, WOVV provides vital information to residents and visitors during weather emergencies such as Hurricane Florence in 2018, often operating under generator power.

In October 2016, Hurricane Matthew toppled WOVV's transmitting tower, knocking the station off the air for a month. While WOVV continued to stream on the internet using a backup generator, the station's volunteers scrambled to return WOVV to the airwaves. Within a month, WOVV was back on the air at reduced power using a borrowed antenna. The next year, in November 2017, a new 70-foot tower was installed with a custom-built directional antenna. The new antenna allowed WOVV to extend its reach as far as the Hatteras Inlet, which is about 25 miles away.

== See also ==
- List of community radio stations in the United States
