= Salter-Battle Hunting and Fishing Lodge =

Historic house in North Carolina, United States

- U.S. National Register of Historic Places
- Location within North Carolina Location within the United States
- Location: Sheep Island, near Ocracoke, North Carolina
- Coordinates: 35°3′28″N 76°4′49″W
- Area: 8 acres (3.2 ha)
- Built: 1945
- Built by: Salter, John Wallace
- Architectural style: Bungalow/craftsman
- NRHP reference No.: 05000381
- Added to NRHP: May 5, 2005

Salter-Battle Hunting and Fishing Lodge, also known as Portsmouth Hunting and Fishing Club, is a historic hunting lodge located on Sheep Island near Ocracoke, Carteret County, North Carolina. It was built about 1945, and is a simple one-story, side-gable, frame building set on concrete piers. A gable-front, screened porch was added about 1948. Also on the property are a contributing cistern, storage shed, and cemetery with the graves of early settlers of the island (1810-1907).

It was listed on the National Register of Historic Places in 2005.
