= Remenchus Glacier =

Glacier in Antarctica

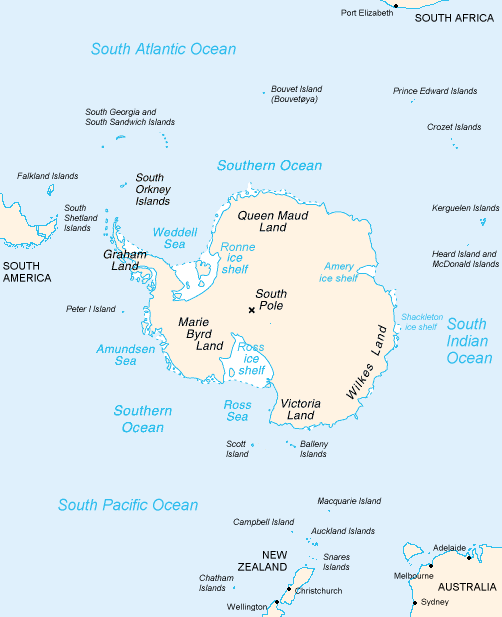
- Map of Antarctica, with Wilkes Land slightly to the right

- Location within Antarctica
- Location: Wilkes Land
- Coordinates: 66°02′00″S 101°35′00″E
- Length: 8 nautical miles (15 km; 9.2 mi)
- Width: 4 nautical miles (7.4 km; 4.6 mi)
- Thickness: unknown
- Status: unknown

Remenchus Glacier (66°2′S 101°35′E) is a channel glacier about 4 nautical miles (7 km) wide and 8 nautical miles (15 km) long, flowing northwest from the continental ice and terminating in a small, but prominent tongue close east of the Mariner Islands and 12 nautical miles (22 km) northeast of Bunger Hills. Mapped from air photos taken by U.S. Navy Operation Highjump, 1946–47, and named by the Advisory Committee on Antarctic Names (US-ACAN) for John F. Remenchus, chief aviation pilot, who assisted U.S. Navy Operation Windmill shore party operations and made photographic flights along Wilhelm II, Queen Mary, Knox and Budd Coasts in January–February 1948.

== See also ==
- List of glaciers in the Antarctic
- Glaciology
