= Ocracoke, North Carolina =

Census-designated place in North Carolina, United States

- Census-designated place
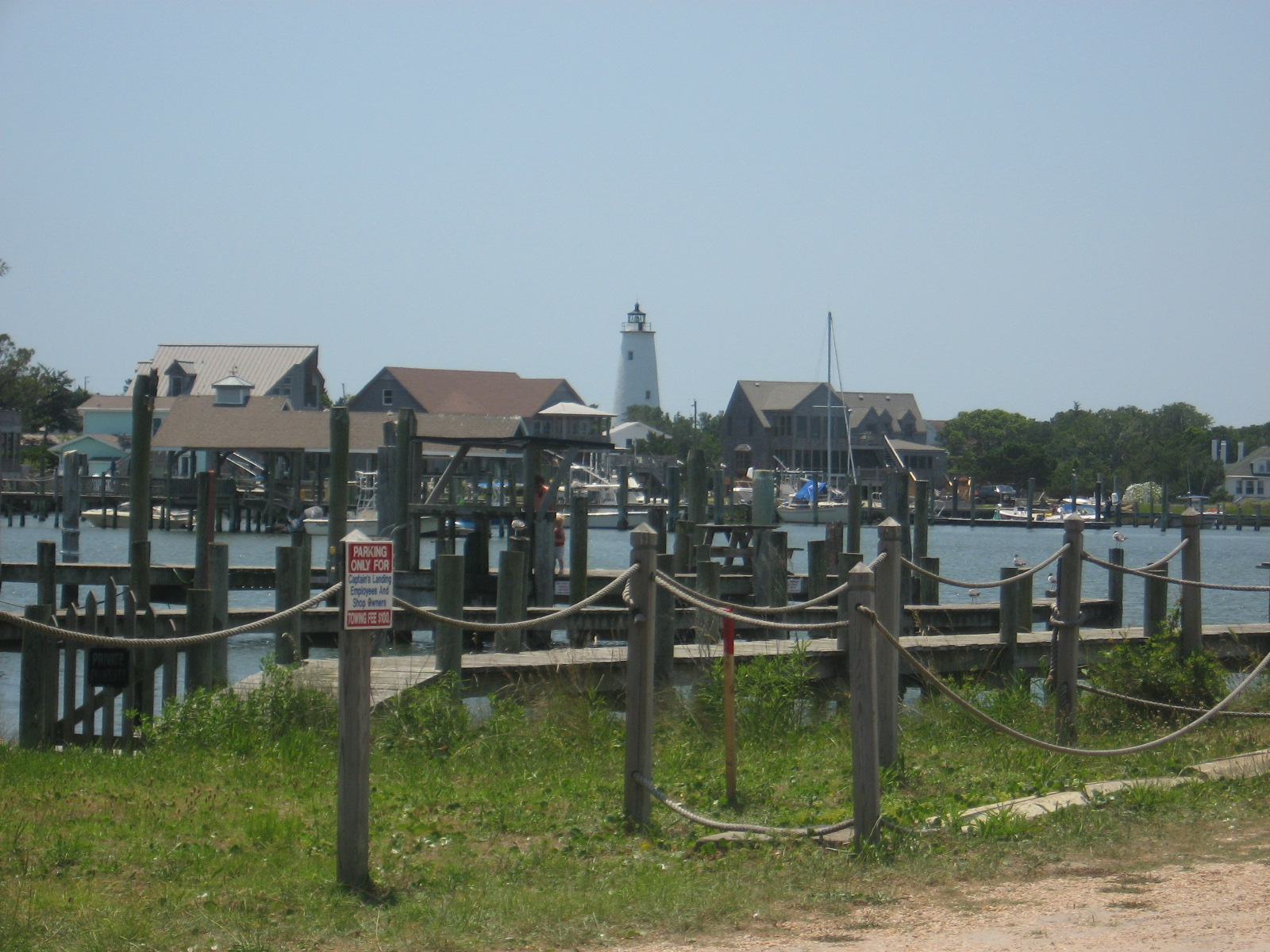
- Ocracoke Lighthouse seen from Ocracoke Harbor
- Interactive map of Ocracoke, North Carolina
- Location within the state of North Carolina
- Coordinates: 35°6′46″N 75°58′33″W
- Country: United States
- State: North Carolina
- County: Hyde
- Named after: Ocracoke Inlet

Area
  - Total: 9.62 sq mi (24.91 km^{2})
  - Land: 8.60 sq mi (22.27 km^{2})
  - Water: 1.02 sq mi (2.64 km^{2})
- Elevation: 3.3 ft (1 m)

Population (2020)
  - Total: 797
  - Density: 92.7/sq mi (35.79/km^{2})
- Time zone: UTC−05:00 (Eastern (EST))
  - Summer (DST): UTC−04:00 (EDT)
- ZIP Code: 27960
- Area code: 252
- FIPS code: 37-48740
- GNIS feature ID: 1021718
- Demonym: Ococker
- Website: visitocracokenc.com

Ocracoke (/ˈoʊkrəkoʊk/ OH-krə-kohk) is a census-designated place (CDP) and unincorporated town located at the southern end of Ocracoke Island, within Hyde County, North Carolina, United States. The population was 797 at the 2020 census, down from 948 at the 2010 census.

No bridges connect Ocracoke Island to the mainland, though the main road across the island is part of North Carolina Highway 12, which uses a series of ferries to connect to Hatteras Island, to Cedar Island, and to the mainland at Swan Quarter. The economy of the island is driven by tourism and commercial fishing. A unique dialect of English, known colloquially as the Hoi Toider accent, is spoken in Ocracoke, though among younger residents it is being replaced by more standard dialects of General American. Ocracoke Island was the location of the pirate Blackbeard's death in November 1718. Though it saw no direct military action, Ocracoke was the site of a Confederate fort during the U.S. Civil War. During World War II, German submarines torpedoed several British ships off the coast of the island; the remains of four sailors washed ashore and they are interred at a small British military cemetery on the island. There is a yearly ceremony to honor the fallen sailors presented by the British Royal Navy, American National Park Service, and American Coast Guard.

Being so far out in the Atlantic Ocean, Ocracoke Island is frequently in the path of tropical cyclones, notably Hurricane Dorian in 2019, which destroyed approximately 1,000 feet (300 m) of pavement along NC 12.

== History ==
The name Ocracoke evolved from the Algonquian word Wokokon or Wococcon which appeared on early maps of the island in the late 16th and early 17th centuries. This name referred to the island and to the nearby areas inhabited by Native Americans. Over time, European explorers and settlers altered the pronunciation and spelling of the name. By the 18th century, it had transformed into “Ocracoke.” The name may have resulted from the way English-speaking settlers understood or mispronounced the Native American term. A popular folklore explanation suggests that the name might have originated from an exclamation attributed to the pirate Blackbeard: “Oh, Crow Cock!”—allegedly a reference to a rooster crowing on the island. However, this is likely just a legend rather than a factual etymology.

In the 16th century, Hatteras and Ocracoke islands were inhabited by Algonquian-speaking Native Americans called the Hatteras or Croatan peoples. Okracoke was called Wococcon by the 16th century explorers, possibly a reference to a Native American settlement at the site. The Hatteras people disappeared by the mid 18th century. Some were victims of epidemics of Old World diseases. Others intermarried with white settlers. "Yaupon tea" or "black drink" was made from the dried leaves of the indigenous yaupon, a native holly, and was used ceremonially by the Indians in the area.

The Italian explorer Giovanni da Verrazzano described the area in detail in 1524. He was unable to navigate the shallow inlets leading into Pamlico Sound. In 1585, Sir Walter Raleigh's ship the Tiger ran aground on a sand bar in Ocracoke Inlet and was forced to land on the island for repairs. English colonists attempted a settlement at Roanoke Island in the late 16th century, but it failed. This effectively halted European settlement in the area until 1663, when the Carolina Colony was chartered by King Charles II. However, remote Ocracoke Island was not permanently settled until 1750, being a pirate haven at times before then. It was a favorite anchorage of Edward Teach, better known as the pirate Blackbeard. He was killed on the island in a fierce battle with troops from Virginia on November 22, 1718. The grounds of what is now the Springer's Point Nature Preserve were said to be his hideout.

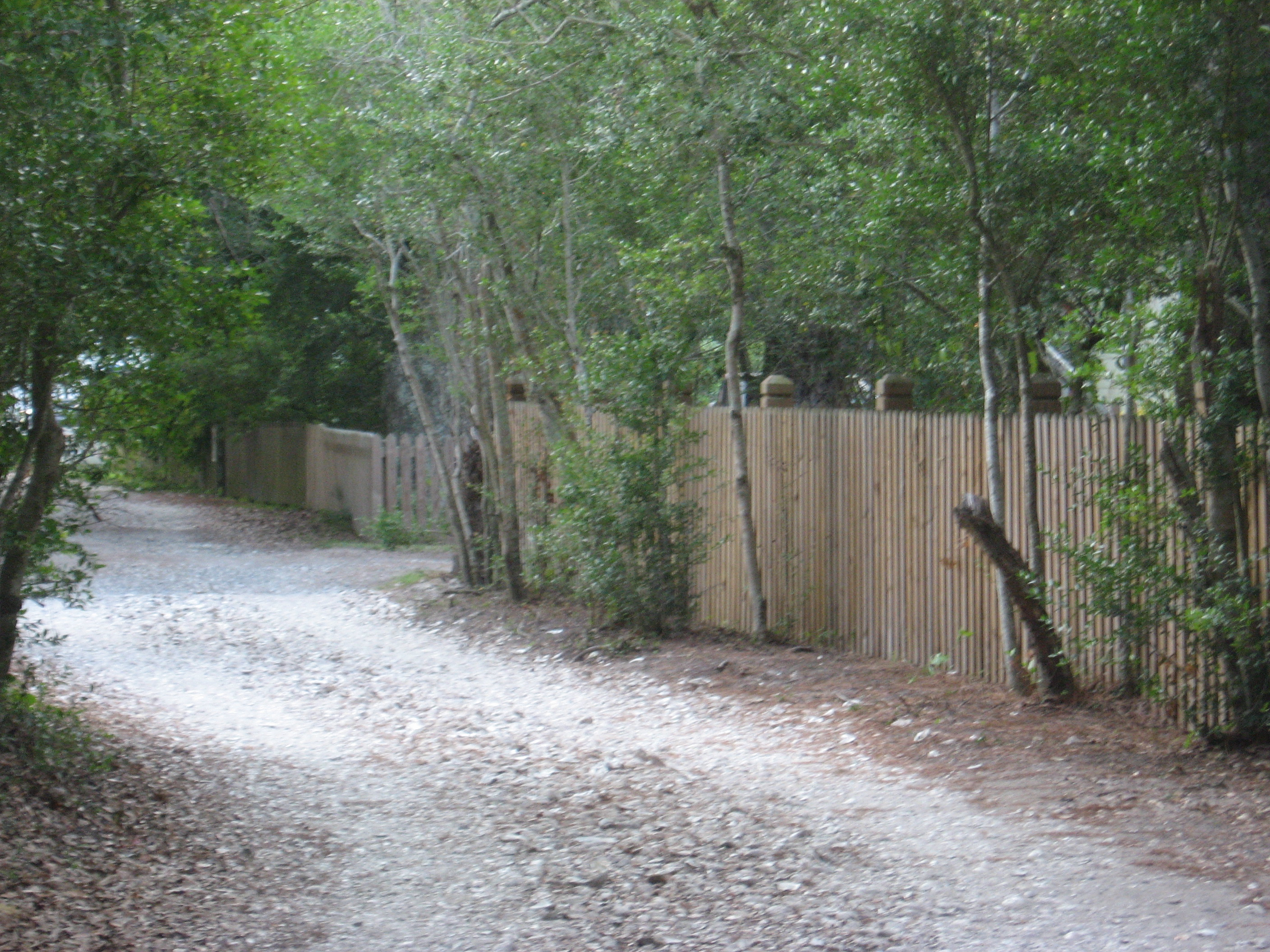
Howard Street

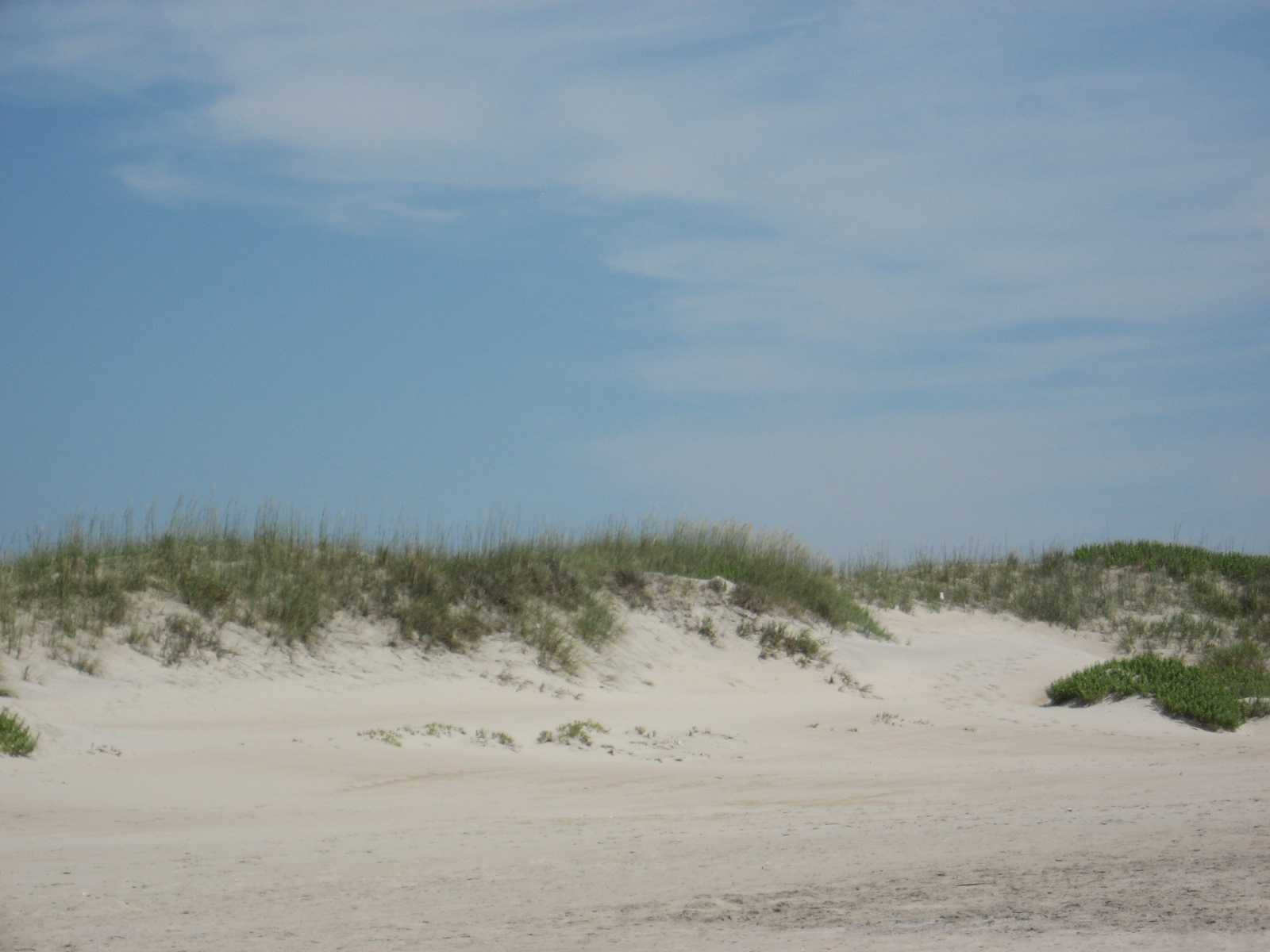
Sand dunes

The state assembly established Pilot Town in 1715. Throughout the mid-to-late 18th century, the island was home to a number of especially skilled schooner pilots who could get smaller ships through the inlet to Pamlico Sound. As population increased on the mainland, demand increased for shipment of goods from ocean-going vessels. Warehouses were built to hold goods off-loaded from larger ships offshore and then loaded onto smaller schooners to be delivered to plantations and towns along the mainland rivers.

By the late 19th century, the shipping business was gone, and the United States Life-Saving Service became a major source of steady income for local men. Fishing became more important to the livelihood of the area, including charters for tourists.

The Ocracoke Historic District, Ocracoke Light Station, and Salter-Battle Hunting and Fishing Lodge are listed on the National Register of Historic Places. Major hurricanes struck the island in August and September 1933, September 1944, and August 1949. The first-person accounts of these storms were recorded on the walls of the "Hurricane House".

Ocracoke continues to suffer frequent storm damage, including the recent Hurricane Dorian in 2019, which destroyed approximately 1,000 feet (300 m) of pavement along NC 12. Afterwards, Ocracoke Island was closed to visitors for contractors to repair the road and dune line. Normal access was restored as of December 5, 2019.

=== Fort Ocracoke ===
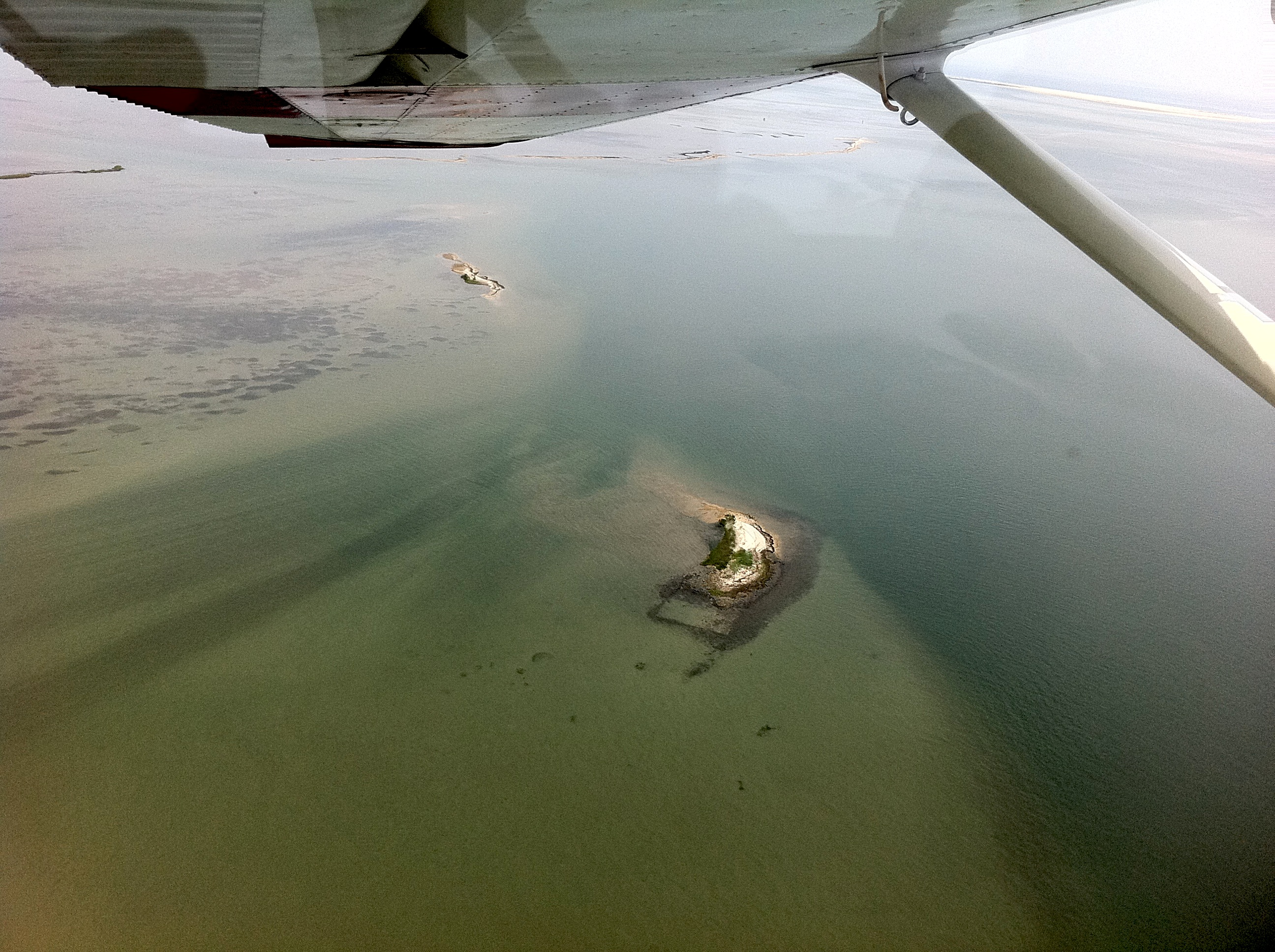
Fort Ocracoke

Fort Ocracoke, a Confederate fortification constructed at the beginning of the American Civil War, was situated on Beacon Island in Ocracoke Inlet, two miles to the west-southwest of Ocracoke village. The octagon-shaped fort was built on a previous War of 1812 site. At one point nearly 500 Confederate troops were stationed in and around Ocracoke and the fort. The Confederates abandoned and partially destroyed the fort in August 1861 after Union victories on nearby Hatteras Island. Union forces razed it a month later on September 17, 1861. Beacon Island and the fort subsided beneath the waves of the inlet after the 1933 hurricanes that struck the area. The remnants of Fort Ocracoke were relocated and identified in 1998 by the Surface Interval Diving Company.

=== Energy modernization project ===
In May 2021, Ocracoke was one of 11 communities (along with nearby Nags Head, North Carolina) chosen by the United States Department of Energy to participate in the Energy Transitions Initiative Partnership Project, a program to provide federal aid for remote communities to modernize their electric infrastructure and resiliency through natural disasters and outages. Ocracoke's grant is used to analyze the possibility of electrifying its ferry fleet. An electrified ferry fleet would increase hurricane evacuation access while decreasing reliance on fossil fuels.

== Geography ==
Ocracoke Island

The island of Ocracoke is a part of the Outer Banks of North Carolina. At various times throughout recorded history the barrier island now known as Ocracoke has been part of Hatteras Island. The "Old Hatteras Inlet" opened prior to 1657 south of the current inlet separating Ocracoke from Hatteras, but closed around 1764 causing the islands to be reconnected. Ocracoke remained connected to Hatteras until Wells Creek Inlet opened in the 1840s and later closed. The modern "Hatteras Inlet" that separates the two islands was formed on September 7, 1846 by a violent gale. This massive storm, known in Cuba as 1846 Havana hurricane and along the East Coast of the United States as the Great Gale of 1846, was the same storm that opened Oregon Inlet.

It is one of the most remote islands in the Outer Banks, as it can only be reached by one of three public ferries (two of which are toll ferries), private boat, or private plane. Other than the village of Ocracoke and a few other areas (a ferry terminal, a pony pen, a small runway), the entire island is part of the Cape Hatteras National Seashore.

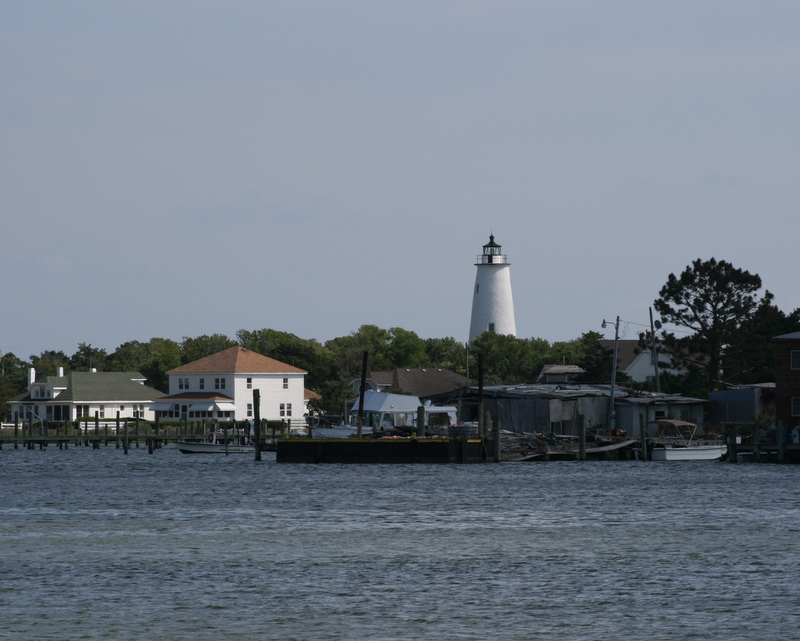
View of Ocracoke Lighthouse across Silver Lake

The village of Ocracoke is located around a small sheltered harbor called Silver Lake, with a second smaller residential area built around a series of man-made canals called Oyster Creek. The village is located at the widest point of the island, protected from the Atlantic Ocean by sand dunes and a salt marsh. The average height of the island is less than five feet (1.5 m) above sea level, and many of the buildings on the island are built on pilings to lift them off the ground. Flooding is a risk during both hurricanes and large storms. Ocracoke Light is situated near Silver Lake and has remained in continuous operation since 1823.

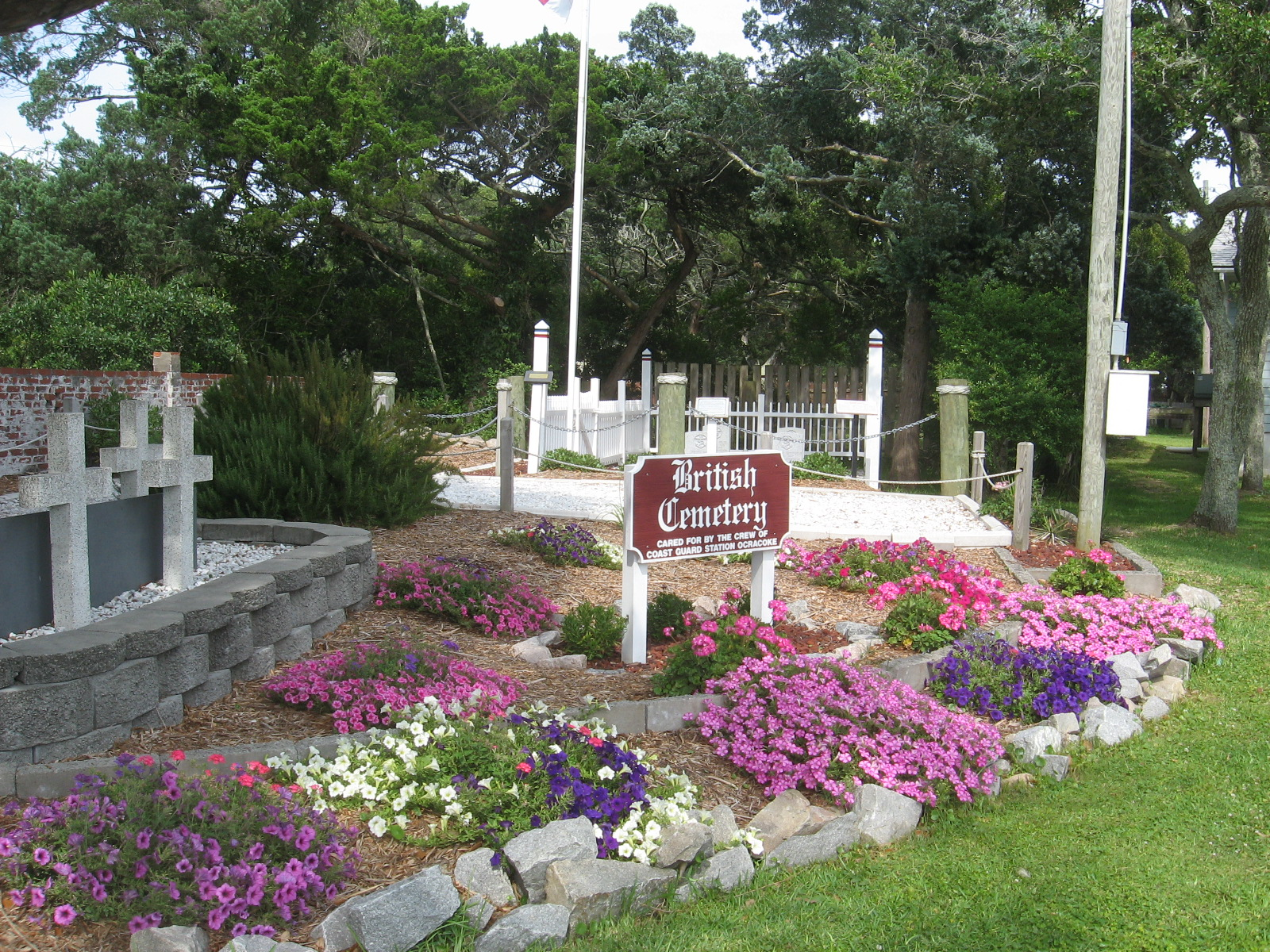
British Cemetery

The island is home to the Ocracoke British Cemetery. During World War II, German submarines sank several British ships, including HMT Bedfordshire, and the bodies of British sailors were washed ashore. They were buried in a cemetery on the island. A lease for the 2,290-square-foot (213 m^{2}) plot, where a British flag flies at all times, was given to the Commonwealth War Graves Commission for as long as the land remained a cemetery, and the small site officially became a British cemetery. The United States Coast Guard station on Ocracoke Island takes care of the property. A memorial ceremony is held each year in May.

Ocracoke village is located at 35°6′46″N 75°58′33″W (35.112687, -75.975895). The United States Census Bureau counts the entire island as a census-designated place (CDP), with a total area of 9.6 square miles (24.9 km^{2}), of which 8.6 square miles (22.3 km^{2}), or 89.58%, of the area is land, and 1.0 square mile (2.6 km^{2}), or 10.58%, is water.

=== Climate ===
Ocracoke has a humid subtropical climate (Cfa) with hot, humid summers and cool, windy winters. Precipitation is plentiful year round and peaks during the months of August and September. The record high and low are 99 °F (37 °C) and 13 °F (−11 °C) and occurred, respectively, on the dates August 18 and 22, 1975 and February 20, 2015. The highest minimum temperature recorded was 84 °F (29 °C) and occurred on July 2, 1973. The lowest maximum temperature recorded was 22 °F (−6 °C) and occurred on February 20, 2015. The highest daily snowfall recorded was 9 in (23 cm) and happened on January 24, 2003. The highest daily snow depth also occurred on January 24, 2003 and was nine inches, with the snow sticking on the ground for five days in total. The first and last average dates for a freeze are December 21 and March 3, giving Ocracoke an average growing season of 293 days. The average first and last dates for a hot 80 °F (27 °C) temperature are May 9 and October 16. The water temperature averages 81.7 °F (27.6 °C) in August to 53.4 °F (11.9 °C) in February, and usually is never above 85 °F (29 °C) or below 50 °F (10 °C), though due to the island's proximity to Cape Hatteras, where the warm Gulf Stream and the cold Labrador Current meet, water temperatures commonly fluctuate year round. The ocean is usually comfortable for swimming from late May into early October.

Climate data for Ocracoke, North Carolina (1991–2020 normals, extremes 1957–present)
Month	Jan	Feb	Mar	Apr	May	Jun	Jul	Aug	Sep	Oct	Nov	Dec	Year
Record high °F (°C)	74 (23)	80 (27)	80 (27)	85 (29)	94 (34)	96 (36)	98 (37)	99 (37)	96 (36)	87 (31)	83 (28)	77 (25)	99 (37)
Mean maximum °F (°C)	69.3 (20.7)	68.8 (20.4)	71.3 (21.8)	77.4 (25.2)	83.4 (28.6)	88.4 (31.3)	90.7 (32.6)	89.9 (32.2)	87.1 (30.6)	82.6 (28.1)	75.9 (24.4)	70.9 (21.6)	91.5 (33.1)
Mean daily maximum °F (°C)	51.8 (11.0)	53.6 (12.0)	58.9 (14.9)	67.7 (19.8)	74.7 (23.7)	81.9 (27.7)	85.3 (29.6)	84.9 (29.4)	80.4 (26.9)	72.5 (22.5)	62.0 (16.7)	55.9 (13.3)	69.1 (20.6)
Daily mean °F (°C)	45.7 (7.6)	47.0 (8.3)	52.3 (11.3)	60.9 (16.1)	68.6 (20.3)	76.1 (24.5)	79.7 (26.5)	78.9 (26.1)	75.1 (23.9)	66.3 (19.1)	56.2 (13.4)	49.6 (9.8)	63.0 (17.2)
Mean daily minimum °F (°C)	39.5 (4.2)	40.3 (4.6)	45.7 (7.6)	54.1 (12.3)	62.6 (17.0)	70.4 (21.3)	74.2 (23.4)	73.0 (22.8)	69.8 (21.0)	60.2 (15.7)	50.4 (10.2)	43.4 (6.3)	57.0 (13.9)
Mean minimum °F (°C)	24.4 (−4.2)	27.5 (−2.5)	33.4 (0.8)	42.5 (5.8)	51.4 (10.8)	60.5 (15.8)	66.7 (19.3)	67.3 (19.6)	61.1 (16.2)	47.8 (8.8)	38.8 (3.8)	30.7 (−0.7)	23.4 (−4.8)
Record low °F (°C)	14 (−10)	13 (−11)	21 (−6)	28 (−2)	37 (3)	48 (9)	60 (16)	57 (14)	50 (10)	36 (2)	25 (−4)	17 (−8)	13 (−11)
Average precipitation inches (mm)	4.13 (105)	4.03 (102)	4.29 (109)	3.78 (96)	3.83 (97)	4.16 (106)	5.04 (128)	7.42 (188)	7.39 (188)	5.19 (132)	4.66 (118)	4.39 (112)	58.31 (1,481)
Average snowfall inches (cm)	1.4 (3.6)	0.2 (0.51)	0.0 (0.0)	0.0 (0.0)	0.0 (0.0)	0.0 (0.0)	0.0 (0.0)	0.0 (0.0)	0.0 (0.0)	0.0 (0.0)	0.0 (0.0)	0.1 (0.25)	1.7 (4.3)
Average precipitation days (≥ 0.01 in)	8.8	9.4	8.8	8.2	7.7	8.8	10.3	10.6	9.8	7.2	8.1	10.1	107.8
Average snowy days (≥ 0.1 in)	0.2	0.3	0.0	0.0	0.0	0.0	0.0	0.0	0.0	0.0	0.0	0.1	0.6
Average relative humidity (%)	70.9	70.0	67.9	68.3	71.4	74.8	77.2	76.1	73.9	71.0	72.5	71.1	72.1
Average dew point °F (°C)	36.9 (2.7)	38.3 (3.5)	42.6 (5.9)	50.3 (10.2)	58.8 (14.9)	67.7 (19.8)	72.3 (22.4)	71.2 (21.8)	66.5 (19.2)	57.0 (13.9)	49.5 (9.7)	41.0 (5.0)	54.4 (12.4)
Source 1: NOAA
Source 2: PRISM (humidity and dew point)

== Transportation and public services ==
A single paved two-lane road, NC 12, runs from the village at the southwestern end of the island to the ferry dock at the northeastern tip of the island, where a one-hour-long free ferry connects to Hatteras Island. The second ferry dock, located in the village, has toll connections to Swan Quarter, on the mainland and Cedar Island, near Atlantic. A passenger ferry operates across Ocracoke Inlet to the deserted village of Portsmouth, at the northern end of the Core Banks.

Ocracoke Island Airport (FAA Identifier W95) is located slightly southeast of the village, allowing small aircraft to land.

Being so far out in the Atlantic Ocean, Ocracoke Island is frequently in the path of tropical cyclones, notably Hurricane Dorian in 2019, which destroyed approximately 1,000 feet (300 m) of pavement along NC 12. This is possibly a consideration against building a bridge to this island.

The lengthy travel time between Ocracoke and other portions of Hyde County meant that, according to David S. Cecelski, author of Along Freedom Road: Hyde County, North Carolina, and the Fate of Black Schools in the South, that "Ocracokers have had little interaction with the rest of Hyde County".

Hyde County maintains the Ocracoke Volunteer Fire Department located on Highway 12.

In addition, transportation to and from Ocracoke is served through the North Carolina Ferry System.

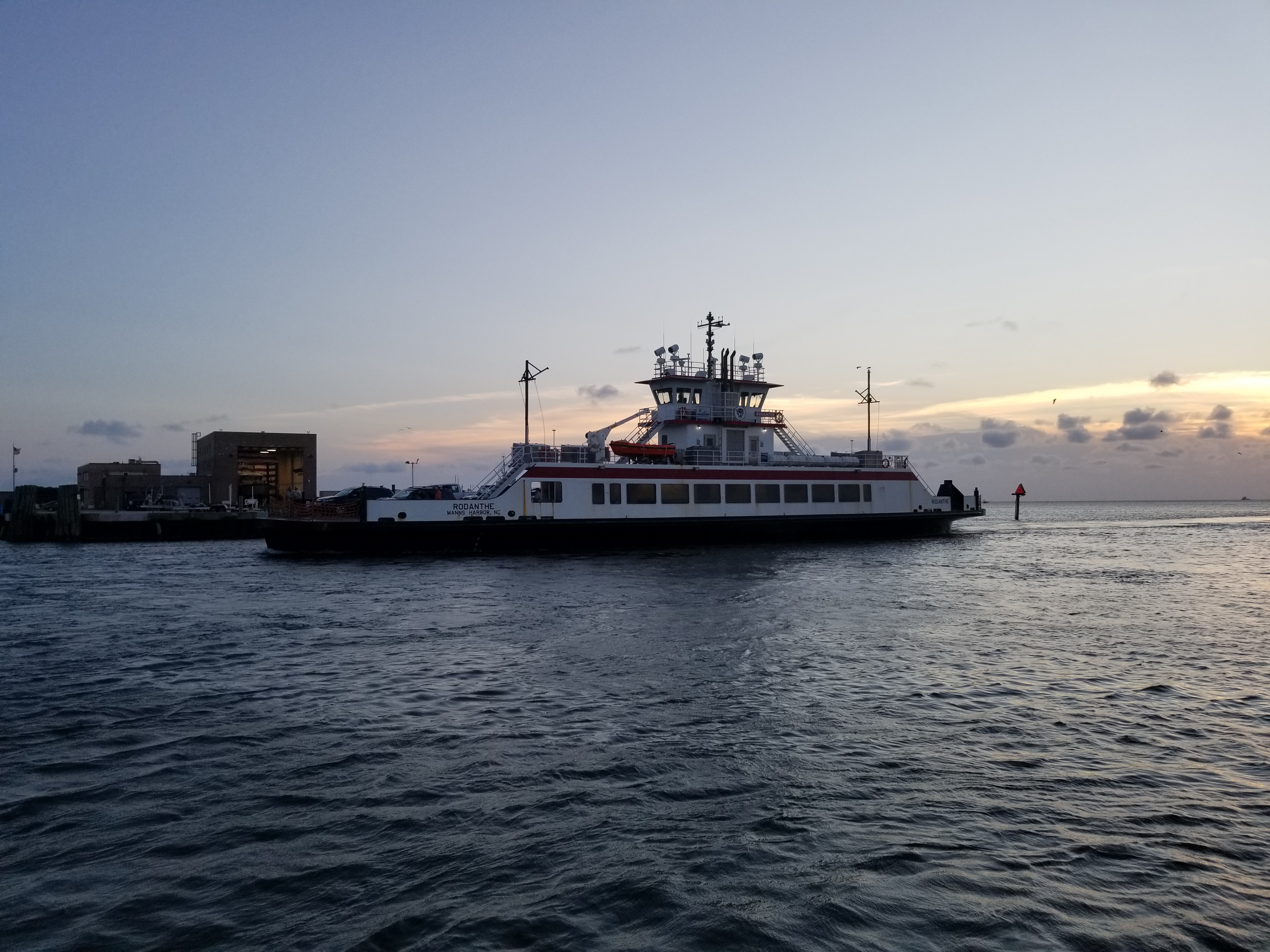
A ferry arriving from Ocracoke

== Economy ==
=== Tourism ===
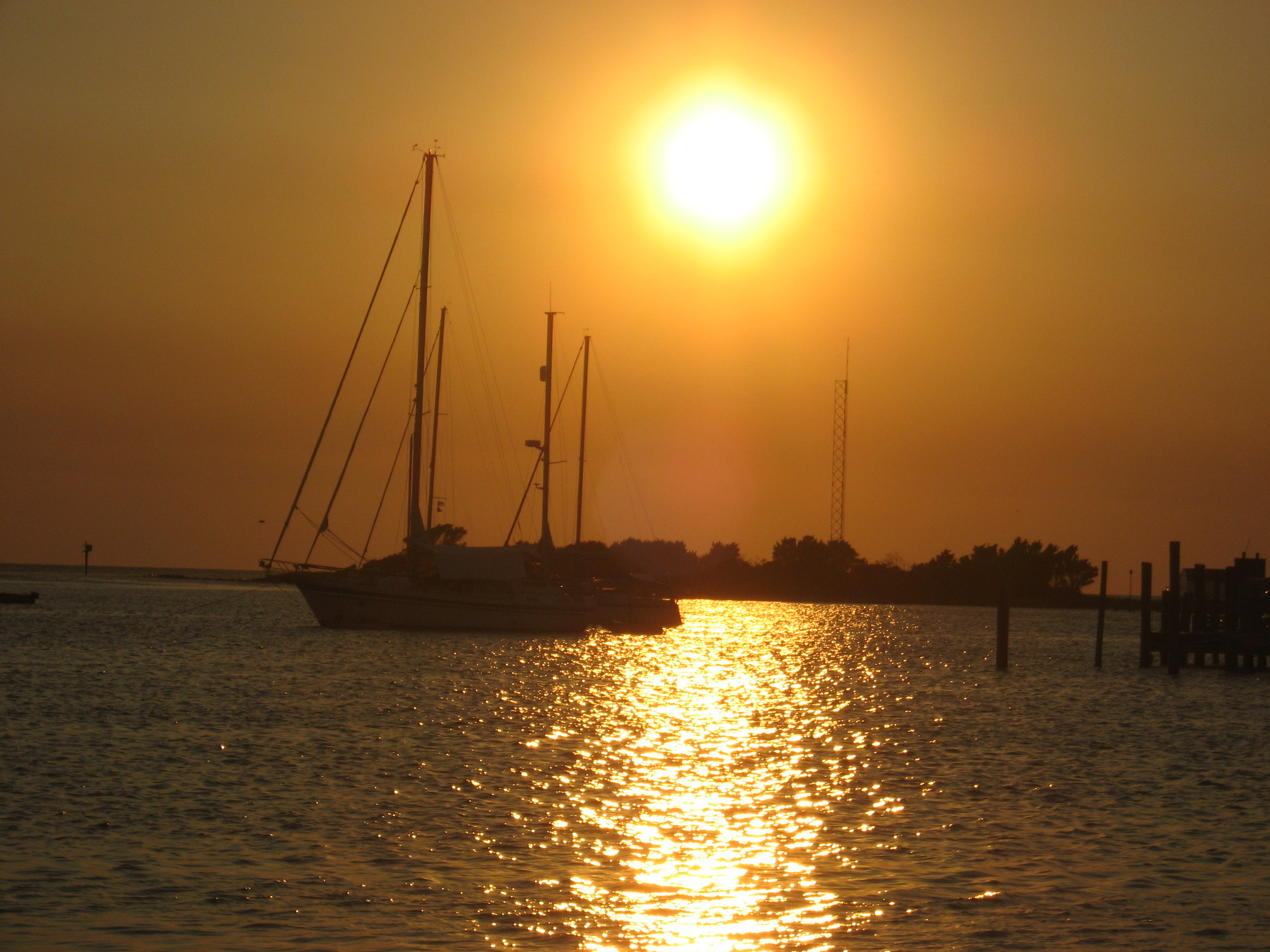
Sunset over Silver Lake Harbor

Many touristic places on the island refer to piracy in their design. They are often decorated with a "Jolly Roger", including the purported flag of Blackbeard.

The economy of Ocracoke Island is based almost entirely on tourism. During the winter, the population shrinks and only a few businesses remain open. During the spring, summer, and early fall, an influx of tourists occupies hotels, campgrounds and weekly rental houses—and day visitors arrive by ferry from Hatteras Island. Several bars, a brewery, dozens of restaurants, and many shops, stores and other tourist-based businesses open for the tourist season. Visitors can find many shops that feature local, handmade goods, as well as imported artisanal goods and rare antiques, unusual for such a small island. Thanks to the island's distance from major population and light pollution sources, in the summer months, the beaches on Ocracoke provide excellent views of the Milky Way galaxy.

=== Fishing ===
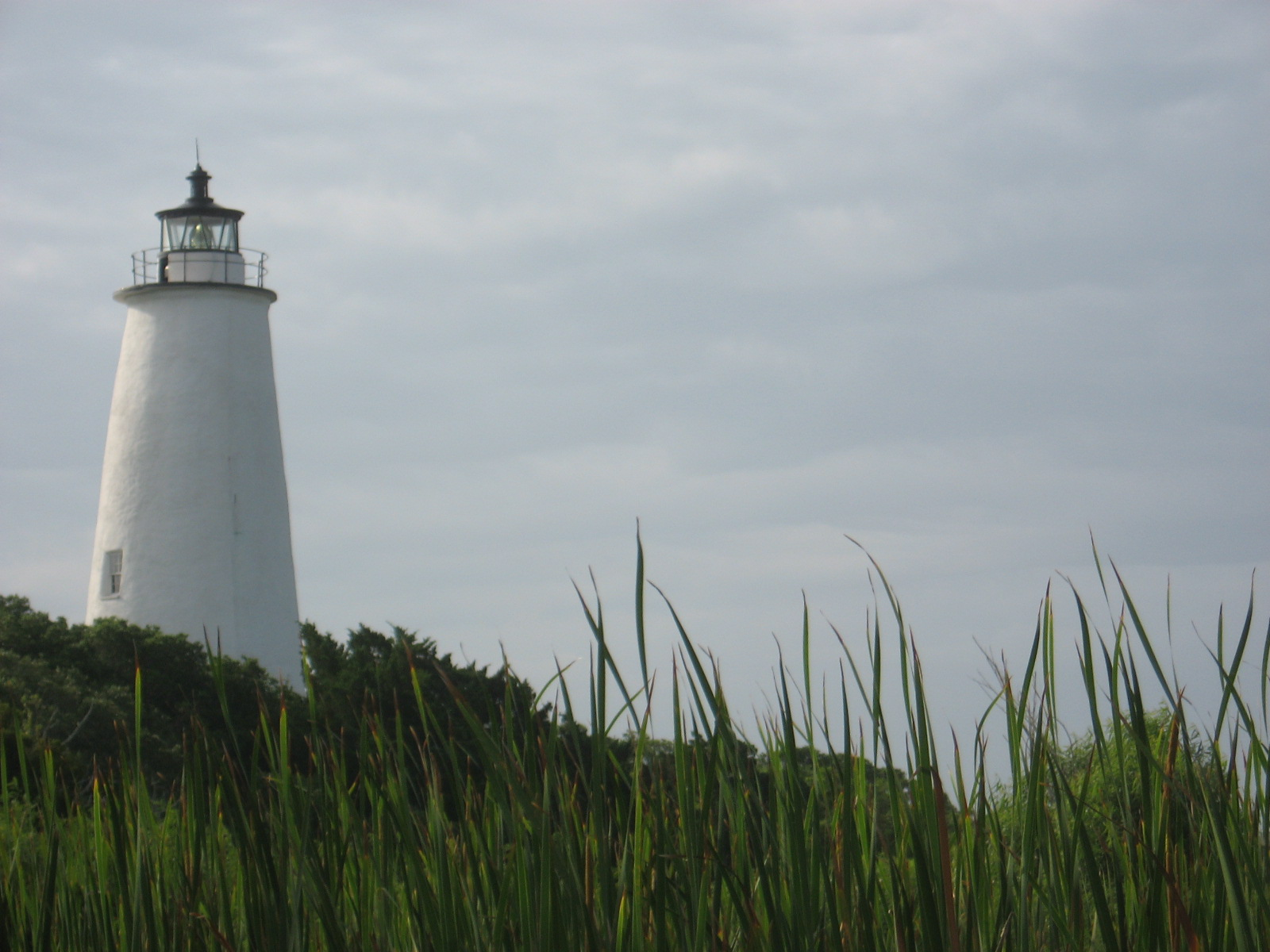
Ocracoke Island Lighthouse

Commercial fishing contributes to the local economy with chartered sport fishing drawing tourism. With easy access to Pamlico Sound, the Atlantic coast and the Gulf Stream, Ocracoke offers various fishing opportunities, from small Sound fish to tuna and drum.

=== Winter economy ===
During the winter, the island's only main employers are construction, the NC Department of Transportation, and the businesses that support the small population. Many islanders use the winter as time off, since they tend to work between 60 and 80 hours a week during the tourist season.

== Local dialect ==
Ocracoke Island and other parts of the Outer Banks historically have a distinct dialect of English, often referred to as a brogue. The dialect is known as the High Tider dialect, after the characteristic phrase "high tide" (often pronounced "hoi toide"). Due to the influx of tourists and greater contact with the mainland in recent years, however, the brogue has been increasingly influenced by outside dialects.

== Demographics ==
Historical population
Census	Pop.	Note	%±
1790	168		—
1800	139		−17.3%
1850	536		—
1980	658		—
1990	713		8.4%
2000	769		7.9%
2010	948		23.3%
2020	797		−15.9%

=== 2020 census ===
Ocracoke racial composition
Race	Number	Percentage
White (non-Hispanic)	694	87.08%
Black or African American (non-Hispanic)	2	0.25%
Other/Mixed	16	2.01%
Hispanic or Latino	85	10.66%

As of the 2020 United States census, there were 797 people, 317 households, and 225 families residing in the CDP.

=== 2010 census ===
As of 2010, there were 948 people living in the CDP. The population density as of 2000 was 80.4 people per square mile (31.1/km^{2}). In 2000, there were 784 housing units at an average density of 82.0 per square mile (31.7/km^{2}) in 2000. As of 2010, the racial makeup of the CDP was 96.2% White, 1.6% African American, 0.6% from two or more races, 0.4% from Native American, and 0.2% Asian. Hispanic or Latino of any race were 19.1% of the population.

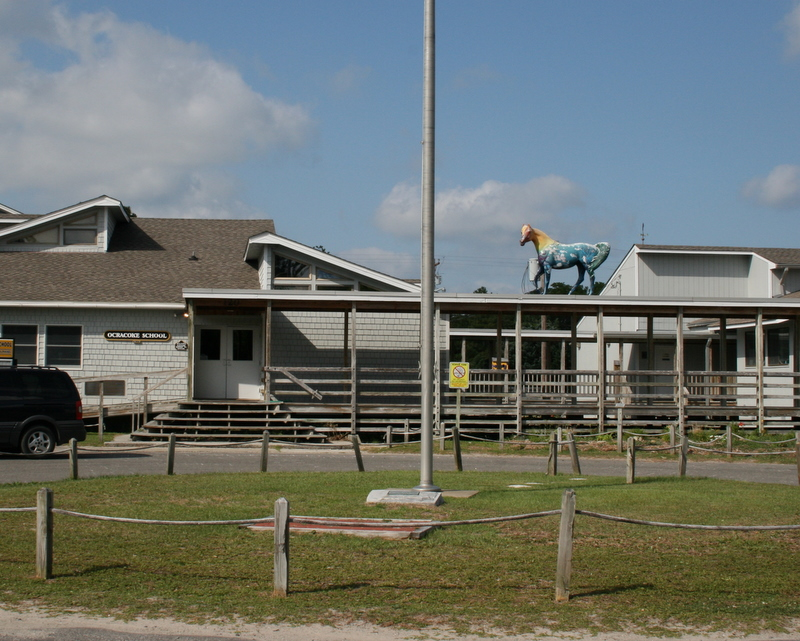
Ocracoke School

There were 370 households, out of which 17.6% had children under the age of 18 living with them, 46.8% were married couples living together, 8.9% had a female householder with no husband present, and 40.8% were non-families. 30.8% of all households were composed of individuals, and 8.9% had someone living alone who was 65 years of age or older. The average household size was 2.08 and the average family size was 2.55.

In the CDP, the population was spread out, with 13.0% under the age of 18, 6.1% from 18 to 24, 28.3% from 25 to 44, 34.6% from 45 to 64, and 17.9% who were 65 years of age or older. The median age was 46 years. For every 100 females, there were 96.2 males. For every 100 females age 18 and over, there were 89.0 males.

The median income for a household in the CDP was $34,315, and the median income for a family was $38,750. Males had a median income of $26,667 versus $25,625 for females. The per capita income for the CDP was $18,032. About 7.7% of families and 9.3% of the population were below the poverty line, including 13.8% of those under age 18 and 10.4% of those age 65 or over.

== Education ==
The residents of Ocracoke Island are served by the Ocracoke School (K–12), part of the Hyde County Schools, with a student population of 186 as of 2019. BHM Regional Library operates a library branch within the Ocracoke School and Community Library.

== Culture ==
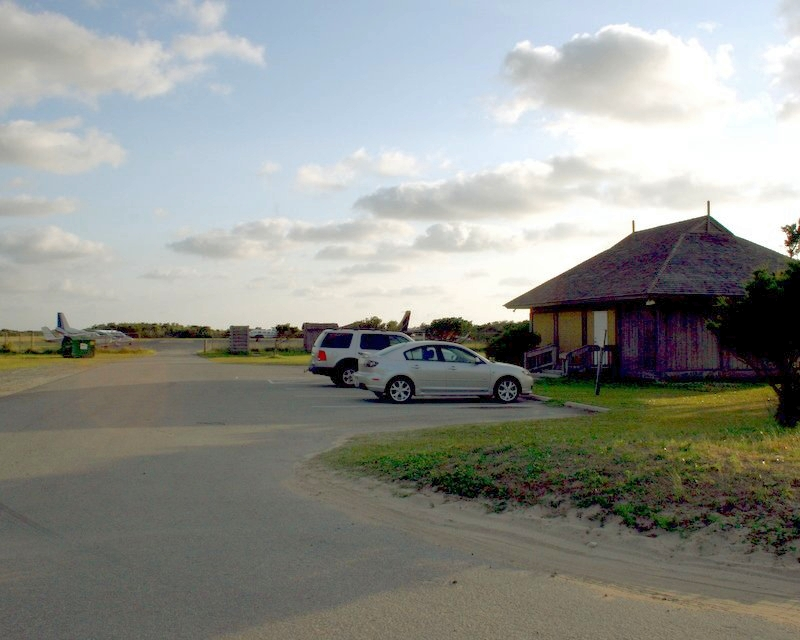
Ocracoke Airport

In Ocracoke, figs and fig cake are a prominent part of the town's cuisine, and the town has an annual fig festival that includes a fig cake contest.

Ocracoke is home to one radio station, WOVV. The studios of WOVV, branded as "Ocracoke Community Radio", are located on Back Road in Ocracoke.

The Ocracoke Observer newspaper provides coverage of local and regional events. The Observer website is updated daily and a monthly print edition is produced March through December.

== In popular culture ==
- Ocracoke is the setting for the bestselling A Holiday for Edith and the Bears in the Lonely Doll series by Dare Wright.
- Ocracoke appears in the novel A Breath of Snow and Ashes by Diana Gabaldon.
  - Ocracoke is the setting for a stone circle portal in Outlander (TV series) based on the books by Diana Gabaldon.
- Most of the setting in the novel The Wish by Nicholas Sparks takes place in Ocracoke.

Preceded by Hatteras Inlet Peninsula	Beaches of The Outer Banks	Succeeded by Portsmouth Island
