= Taylor Islands =

Group of islands in Antarctica

Taylor Islands (66°10′S 100°17′E) is a group of rocky islands and rocks in Antarctica, lying at the west side of Edisto Ice Tongue and marking the west end of the Highjump Archipelago. Delineated from aerial photographs taken by U.S. Navy Operation Highjump, 1946–47, and named for Richard Spence Taylor, who served as surveyor with the U.S. Navy Operation Windmill parties which established astronomical control stations from Wilhelm II Coast to Budd Coast in January–February 1948.

== See also ==
- List of antarctic and sub-antarctic islands
