= Günther Krech =

German U-boat commander (1914–2000)

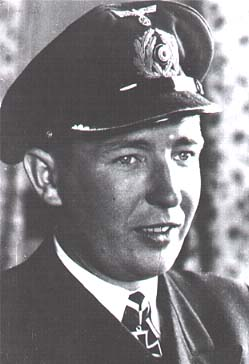
- Born: 14 September 1914; Wilhelmshaven, German Empire
- Died: 3 June 2000 (aged 85); Wuppertal, Germany
- Military career
- Allegiance: Weimar Republic; Nazi Germany
- Branch: Reichsmarine; Kriegsmarine
- Service years: 1933–1945
- Rank: Kapitänleutnant (Kriegsmarine)
- Unit: 1st U-boat Flotilla
- Commands: U-558
- Conflicts: World War II
- Awards: Knight's Cross of the Iron Cross

Günther Paul Krech (21 September 1914 – 3 June 2000) was a German U-boat commander in the Kriegsmarine during World War II. He was credited with sinking 19 Allied ships across 10 war patrols, totalling 100,771 gross register tons (GRT) sunk.

== Pre-war service ==
Krech was born on 21 September 1914 in Wilhelmshaven and entered the Reichsmarine in April 1933 as a cadet. His training was typical of any recruit; he served aboard the sail training ship Gorch Fock and the light cruiser Karlsruhe before entering the Naval Academy in Flensburg. Like several other officers who would go on to become successful U-boat commanders, he was seconded to the Luftwaffe. From September 1936 until February 1939 he served in various staff positions which included service with the coastal artillery, and at one point he served in the Oberkommando der Luftwaffe (OKL).

Krech was commissioned as a Leutnant zur See in October 1936 and eighteen months later he had been promoted to Oberleutnant zur See. He entered torpedo school on his return to the Kriegsmarine and entered the U-boat service in November 1939.

== World War II ==
In March 1940, Krech was assigned to U-5 for training, he briefly served as a watch officer before he was transferred to his first combat posting aboard U-100 in May as first watch officer, under the command of Kapitänleutnant Joachim Schepke. He left U-100 in November 1940 and attended commander training whilst attached to the 24th U-boat Flotilla. He completed his training and took command of U-558 on 20 February 1941. On 13 March he was promoted to Kapitänleutnant.

U-558 left Brest, France, on 1 June 1941 for operations in the Atlantic Ocean on her first patrol, this patrol, as well as Krech's second patrol - were unsuccessful. Krech's third patrol began on 25 August. U-558 was again taken out to the Atlantic, just off the west coast of Ireland. On the 26th, the Allied convoy OS 4 was sighted heading south just off the Irish west coast. On the 28th Krech and his crew claimed their first victory; they sank the British merchant vessel MV Otaoi - thirteen of her crew were killed. U-558 made an effort to pursue other convoys but to no avail. Krech returned to Brest on 16 September.

U-558's fourth patrol began on 11 October and on the evening of the 15th, they sank the Canadian merchant ship Vancouver Island. At 9:54 PM the ship was spotted by U-558. Krech fired two torpedoes from about 200 metres (220 yd), hitting the ship. The vessel was struck at the bow and amidships but did not sink. Because Krech wanted to continue hunting for other ships, he fired two more torpedoes, both hitting Vancouver Island's stern causing her to sink fast taking 105 passengers and crew down with her - there were no survivors. In the early hours of the 17th, about 600 miles (970 km) west of Rockall, Krech sank three ships: the British steamer W.C. Teagle and two Norwegian steamers, Erviken and Rym. It was also presumed that U-558 sank a corvette of the escort; HMS Gladiolus, although this cannot be confirmed. With no remaining torpedoes, Krech took U-558 back to port for resupply. Krech's fifth patrol was cut short as they were strafed and damaged by Allied aircraft shortly after leaving port.

On 10 February 1942, Krech left port once again headed for the North Atlantic and was directed to the westbound convoy ONS 67. The convoy was attacked on the morning of the 24th; three ships were hit by U-558, the British tankers MV Anadara was damaged and SS Inverauder and the Norwegian tanker MV Eidanger were sunk. He returned to port on 11 March.

During his next patrol, which started on 12 April, Krech headed for the coast of the United States. On 12 May he sunk the British armed trawler HMT Bedfordshire just off Cape Lookout, North Carolina, there were no survivors. Krech then took U-558 southwards and on the 18th sank the Dutch SS Fauna near the Bahamas. Three days later on 21 May he sunk the Canadian SS Troisdoc west of Jamaica. On the 23rd he torpedoed and damaged the US tanker SS William Boyce Thompson, then on the 25th, he sunk the SS Beatrice using the U-boat's deck gun southeast of Kingston, Jamaica. Two days later Krech and his crew sunk the U.S. Army transport ship Jack. The torpedo struck Jack on the starboard side and tore a large hole in the hull, blew the hatch covers off, stopped the engines and damaged the radio. Jack sunk in around four minutes with the loss of 37 of her crew. He sank one more ship - the Dutch SS Triton on 1 June, before returning to Brest on the 21st.

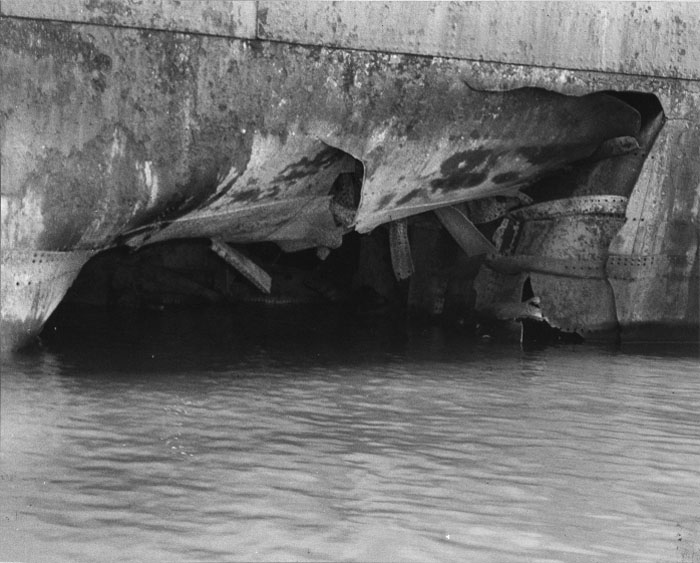
The torpedo-damaged hull of William Boyce Thompson

On his next patrol Krech headed for the Caribbean Sea, arriving in mid-August. He attacked and sunk a straggler from convoy WAT 15 on the 25th, the British SS Amakura. By September 1942, U-558 was in the eastern Caribbean, on 13 September, Krech sank the British MV Empire Lugard, the Dutch SS Suriname and the Norwegian tanker MV Vilja west of Grenada. On the 16th he sighted the SS Commercial Trader and fired two torpedoes. She was hit and sank in minutes killing ten of her crew. On 17 September Krech was awarded the Knight's Cross of the Iron Cross. The patrol ended at Brest on 16 October.

After some leave, Krech and his crew returned to U-558 on 9 January 1943 and headed for the Atlantic once again and joined "Delphin group", a pack of U-boats, on the 23rd. Towards the end of January the group headed for an area north-west of the Canary Islands and then towards Gibraltar. On 7 February a small coastal convoy was sighted and five U-boats from "Delphin group" closed in. But the operation was quickly cancelled due to the convoy having a strong air escort. The group then headed westwards and were directed towards another convoy. During the evening of the 23rd, U-558 torpedoed and sank the British tanker SS Empire Norseman 500 miles (800 km) south of the Azores. This was to be Krech's last success. Other convoys were later sighted but no more ships were sunk by U-558 due to bad weather and strong Allied air cover. U-558 returned to Brest on 29 March 1943.

On 8 May, U-558 set out for the Atlantic again, this time as part of "Wolfpack Oder" along with eight other U-boats, hunting for convoy HX 238. The convoy was sighted on 22 May but the group were forced to keep their distance due to a strong Allied air presence escorting the convoy. The group was spotted anyway and many of the U-boats were attacked and damaged by Allied aircraft. On the 23rd the operation was terminated and new patrol lines were formed in the areas near the Azores and east of Bermuda. The U-boats laid in wait for Allied convoys to pass through but none were sighted, they were instead attacked by Allied aircraft. By 29 June the operation was once again called off.

=== The loss of U-558 ===
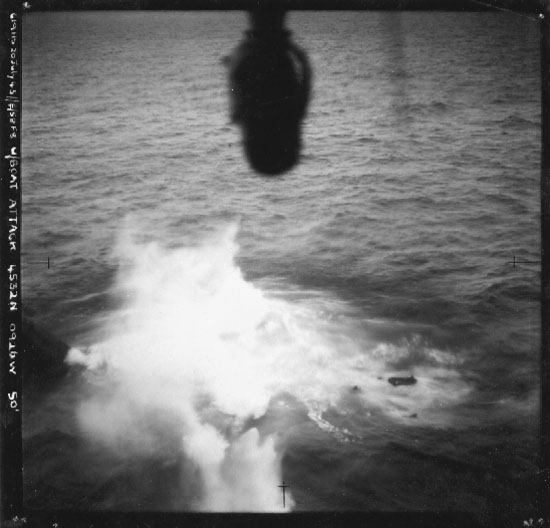
U-558 during the final depth charge attack – taken by the Halifax bomber aircraft of 58 Squadron, Royal Air Force

On 15 July 1943, U-558 was attacked by a Wellington bomber but the aircraft was driven off and Krech dived his U-boat to escape. However, the position of U-558 had already been marked by Allied air command. Two days later U-558 was again attacked on the surface by Allied aircraft and was heavily damaged. On 20 July, whilst U-558 was attempting to return to Brest, it was spotted in daylight in the Bay of Biscay by a United States Air Force B-24 Liberator aircraft and depth charged. U-558 was again heavily damaged leaving the U-boat unable to dive. Water had entered the U-boat's batteries causing the formation of chlorine gas which killed around twenty of the crew. With the anti-aircraft guns' ammunition expended, the remaining crew (around thirty men) attempted to surrender to the aircraft by lining up on the forward deck of the U-boat and waving their arms, however, they were still strafed by Allied aircraft, killing around a dozen sailors. U-558 was then spotted by a Royal Air Force Halifax bomber whom dropped a further eight depth-charges, landing a direct hit on Krech's boat, sinking it almost immediately. Around a dozen survivors clung to a rubber dinghy, a handful of which succumbed to the chlorine gas they had been exposed to earlier. Of U-558's crew of 50, 45 were killed. Five survived, among them, Krech. They were picked up by HMCS Athabaskan on 25 July, all suffering from exposure.

== Post-War ==
Krech spent the next three years in British captivity, being released in 1946. He returned to Germany and reintegrated into civilian life. During his time in captivity he was interrogated and a report stated that Kapitänleutnant Krech was cool, efficient, serious and a commander who was greatly respected by his men. The four men who survived the sinking of U-558 said that they were in no doubt that their survival was due mainly to the attitude and humour of their commander. Krech died in Wuppertal, North-Rhine-Westphalia, on 3 June 2000. He was 85 years old.

== Awards ==
- Luftwaffe Observation Badge (2 November 1936)
- Memel Medal (9 May 1940)
- Sudetenland Medal (3 September 1940)
- Iron Cross (1939)
  - 2nd Class (12 October 1940 – 23 October 1940)
  - 1st Class (26 September 1940)
- U-boat War Badge (1939) (26 September 1940)
- Knight's Cross of the Iron Cross on 17 September 1942 as Kapitänleutnant and commander of U-558
