= Booth Peninsula =

Peninsula in Antarctica

Booth Peninsula (66°6′S 101°13′E) is a rocky peninsula, 4 nautical miles (7 km) long and 1 nautical mile (2 km) wide, of Antarctica, which projects west from the coast 3 nautical miles (6 km) southwest of Remenchus Glacier. It was mapped from aerial photographs taken by U.S. Navy Operation Highjump, 1946–47, and named by the Advisory Committee on Antarctic Names for George H. Booth, an air crewman on the Operation Highjump seaplane commanded by D.E. Bunger which landed in this area and obtained aerial and ground photographs of this ice-free region.
