= Ocracoke Light =

Lighthouse in North Carolina, United States

Ocracoke Light Ocracoke Light
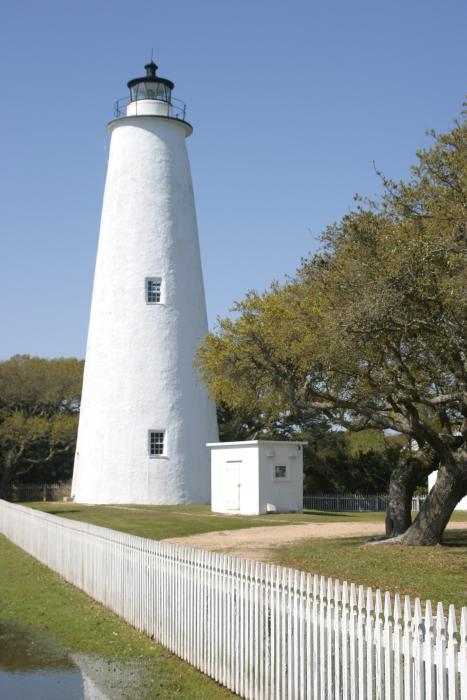
- Location: SR 1326, Ocracoke Island, Ocracoke, North Carolina
- Coordinates: 35°6′32.3″N 75°59′9.8″W

Tower
- Constructed: 1823
- Foundation: Dressed stone / timber
- Construction: Brick with mortar surface
- Automated: 1955
- Height: 76 feet (23 m)
- Shape: Conical
- Markings: White
- Heritage: National Register of Historic Places listed place
- Fog signal: none

Light
- First lit: August 15, 1824 (current tower)
- Focal height: 75 feet (23 m)
- Lens: 4th order Fresnel lens installed 1854
- Range: 15 nautical miles (28 km; 17 mi)
- Characteristic: Fixed white
- Ocracoke Light Station
- U.S. National Register of Historic Places
- Area: 2 acres (0.81 ha)
- Built: 1823
- Architect: Noah Porter
- NRHP reference No.: 77000110
- Added to NRHP: November 25, 1977

Ocracoke /ˈoʊkrʌkoʊk/ Light is a lighthouse that was built in Hyde County, on Ocracoke Island, Ocracoke, North Carolina in 1823 by Massachusetts builder Noah Porter. The lighthouse stands 75 feet (23 m) tall. Its diameter narrows from 25 feet (7.6 m) at the base to 12 feet (3.7 m) at its peak. The lighthouse was built to help guide ships through Ocracoke Inlet into Pamlico Sound.

In 1864, Confederate troops dismantled the fourth-order Fresnel Lens, but Union forces later restored it.

Ocracoke Light is the oldest operating light station in North Carolina and the second oldest lighthouse still standing in the state. The lighthouse was automated in 1955. During the summer months when there is a U.S. National Park Ranger on duty, visitors may access the base of the lighthouse. Access to the top of the lighthouse is not allowed due to the simple steel spiral staircase being safe only for maintenance activity.

However, this is not the original staircase; the original staircase was a wooden step spiral built into the inside of the exterior wall. This was removed during the 1950s due to excessive rotting to the boards and a lacking necessity for a substantial staircase because of the automation of the light. The wooden stairs were removed and the holes in the all-brick lighthouse were cemented closed.

The lighthouse was added to the National Register of Historic Places in 1977 as Ocracoke Light Station.

== Controversy ==
Various claims have been made about the light, including "the Ocracoke Light is the second oldest operating lighthouse in the nation," from the National Park Service. The original 1795 construction a mile away would qualify only as fifth oldest and the current 1823 tower is about twelfth oldest.

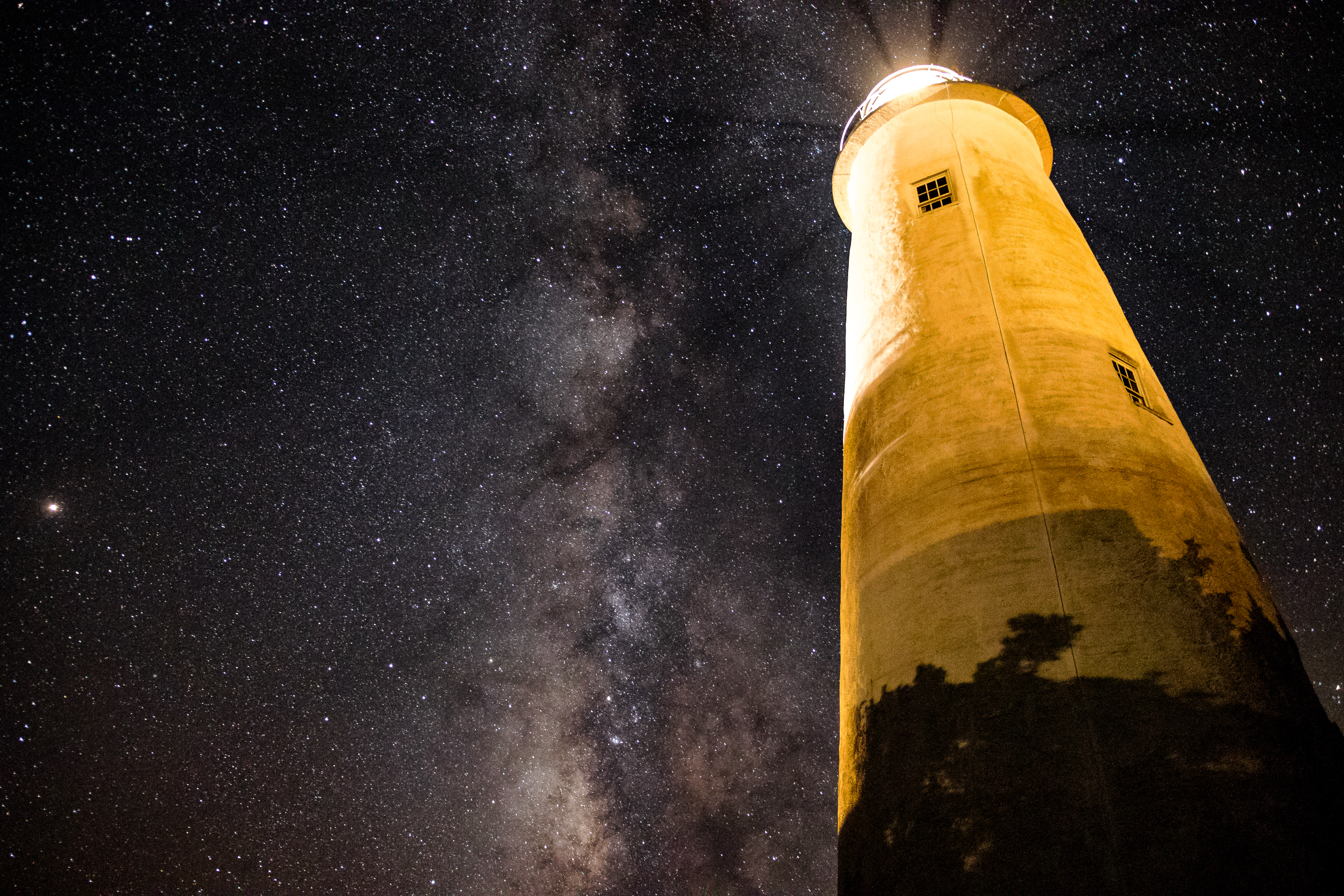
Ocracoke Lighthouse with the Milky Way Galaxy

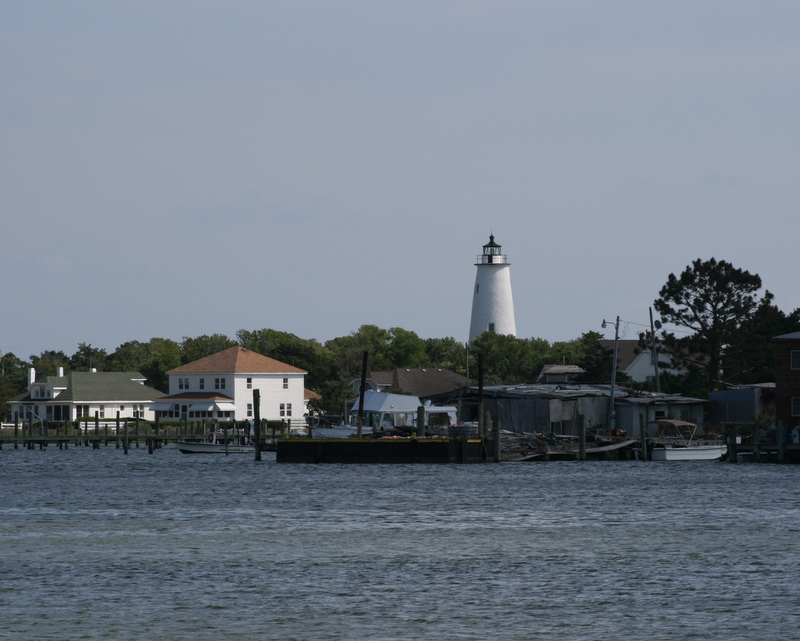
Ocracoke Lighthouse and Silver Lake from Ocracoke National Park Museum

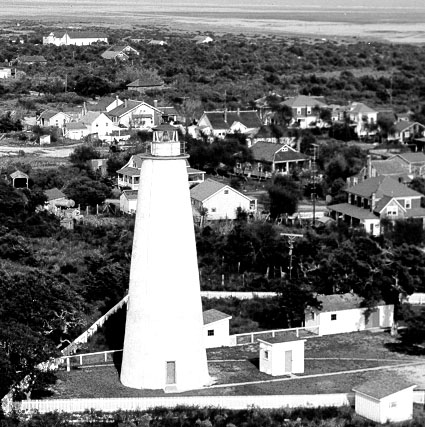
U.S. Coast Guard Archive
