= Thomas Island =

Island in Queen Mary Land, Antarctica

Thomas Island (66°7′S 100°57′E) is a large Antarctic island in the Highjump Archipelago, 6 nautical miles (11 km) long and from 1 to 3 nautical miles (6 km) wide. It lies near the center of the main cluster of islands off the north flank of the Bunger Hills.

It was mapped from air photos taken by U.S. Navy Operation Highjump, 1946–47, and was named by the Advisory Committee on Antarctic Names (US-ACAN) for Lieutenant (j.g.) Randolph G. Thomas, U.S. Navy, hydrographic officer with U.S. Navy Operation Windmill, 1947–48, who served as surveyor with the astronomical control parties.

== See also ==
- List of Antarctic and sub-Antarctic islands
