= Highjump Archipelago =

Island group in Antarctica

Coordinates: 66°5′S 101°0′E

The Highjump Archipelago is a group of rocky islands, rocks and ice rises in Antarctica, about 93 kilometres (50 nmi) long and from 9 to 28 kilometres (5 to 15 nmi) wide, lying generally north of the Bunger Hills and extending from the Taylor Islands, close northwest of Cape Hordern, to a prominent group of ice rises which terminate close west of Cape Elliott. It was delineated from aerial photographs taken by U.S. Navy Operation Highjump 1946–47 and so named by the Advisory Committee on Antarctic Names. The codeword "highjump" was used for identifying the U.S. Navy Task Force 68, 1946–47. This task force was divided into three groups which completed photographic flights covering approximately 70 per cent of the coastal areas of Antarctica, excluding the Antarctic Peninsula, as well as significant portions of the interior.
