= Alligator Lake =

Alligator Lake

- Alligator Lake (Desha County, Arkansas)
- Alligator Lake (Miller County, Arkansas)
- Alligator Lake (Prairie County, Arkansas)
- Alligator Lake (North Carolina)
- Alligator Lake, Yukon, a lake in Yukon
- Alligator Lake, Texas, a lake in Texas
- Alligator Lake, Osceola County, Florida, a lake in Florida
- Alligator Lake, Columbia County, Florida, a lake in Florida
- Alligator Lake Volcanic Complex, a volcano in Yukon
