= Alligator Lake (North Carolina) =

Lake in North Carolina

- New Lake
- Location within North Carolina
- Location: Hyde County, North Carolina
- Group: Pocosin lakes
- Coordinates: 35°38′41″N 76°20′27″W
- Type: Freshwater lake
- Primary inflows: Alligator River, Pungo River
- Max. width: 3.5 miles (5.6 km)
- Surface area: 6,000 acres (2,400 ha)
- Max. depth: Approx 7 feet (2.1 m)

Alligator Lake, also called New Lake, is a natural freshwater lake in Hyde County, North Carolina. It has a diameter of approximately 3.5 miles (5.5 kilometers), and its 6,000-acre area makes it one of the five largest natural freshwater lakes in North Carolina. Like the other freshwater lakes of North Carolina, it is quite shallow, having a maximum depth of between 6 and 7 feet. Its two outlets are Alligator River and Pungo River.

== History ==
It is believed that the lake formed after a ground fire burning out pockets of peat and created a depression that later filled with rainwater. European settlers had discovered Alligator Lake by 1765, and Mennonites had established the community of "New Lake" on the shores of Alligator Lake by 1780. Originally inaccessible by road, the community was first connected to other towns by Squyars Canal, a small waterway which was built to connect it to the a tributary of the Alligator River after 1784. The earliest known map depicting the lake is from 1812.

The later addition of Dunbar Canal in 1823 greatly improved the town's commercial prospects, and in 1840 Walter Gwynn led the construction of a canal linking it to Pungo River. This lowered the lake's level and created an embankment that allowed for the creation of a road connecting it to Hyde County, which Alligator Lake was eventually incorporated into.

The lake has been officially called New Lake since at least 1998, but is still commonly called Alligator Lake.

Currently, 85% of its area is part of the Pocosin Lakes National Wildlife Refuge, and the remaining 15% is privately owned. The wildlife refuge maintains a public access point.
