= Currituck =

Currituck may refer to:

== Places ==
- Currituck, North Carolina, U.S.
- Currituck County, North Carolina, U.S.
- Currituck Township, in Hyde County, North Carolina, U.S.
- Currituck Island, Antarctica

== Other uses ==
- USS Currituck, the name of several ships
- Currituck, a Microsoft codename for Team Foundation Work Item Tracking

== See also ==
- Currituck Co., an indie folk project
