= Frying Pan, North Carolina =

Unincorporated community in North Carolina, US

Coordinates: 35°48′10″N 76°06′13″W

Frying Pan is an unincorporated community in Tyrrell County, North Carolina, United States.

The community was named for a nearby inlet of the Alligator River said to be shaped like a frying pan.
