= Currituck Township =

Currituck Township is in Hyde County, North Carolina. An architectural inventory was completed for it and other areas of Hyde County, North Carolina including Fairfield Township, Lake Landing Township, Swan Quarter Township, and Ocracoke.

Per a 1981 North Carolina House bill, one of the Hyde County’s five commissioners is elected from Currituck Township. There had been three commissioners. Various commissioners have represented the township.

The headwaters of Smith Creek are in the area.

== History ==
Corn, cotton, wheat, and potatoes were reported as crops grown in the area. Cemeteries were documented in the area.

In 1880, the census reported more than 2,000 residents. By 1890 and into the first decades of the 20th century is had about 2,250 residents.

In 1901, a house bill proposed Pender County assessing a levy on the county to fund a public road across Black River Swamp.

It had a justice of the peace officials appointed for it. Latham’s school house was in it. Cary Latham was a teacher. The Knights of Hyde was a beneficial organization serving the area.

In 1917 there was a bill in the North Carolina Senate to protect stock in the township.

In 2000, the U.S. census counted 1,200 residents.

It and other areas in North Carolina were divided separate school districts for “colored” residents. It and other areas had hunting seasons.

== See also ==
- George V. Credle House and Cemetery
