= Sladesville =

Unincorporated are in North Carolina

Coordinates: 35°27′50″N 76°29′22″W

Sladesville is an unincorporated community in Hyde County, North Carolina. It was incorporated as a town January 27, 1849. There was a Sladesville Ginning Company and a Sladesville Transportation Company. There was a community school for white students and Hyde County Training School was established for African Americans.

Fletcher A. Manning wrote about the community in his memoir.

In the 1940 Census Enumeration District Descriptions it was listed as unincorporated and noted under Currituck Township. There is a Sladesville-Credle Road.
