= Last Chance, North Carolina =

Unincorporated community in North Carolina, US

Coordinates: 35°27′09″N 076°04′32″W

Last Chance is an unincorporated community in Hyde County, North Carolina, United States.

== Education ==
The local school is Mattamuskeet School of Hyde County Schools.
