= Alligator Township, North Carolina =

Township in North Carolina, USA

Alligator is a township in Tyrrell County, North Carolina, United States. The township has 208 residents.

== Geography ==
Its location is off the eastern stretch of U.S. Route 64 between Columbia and Manteo. It borders the northwestern portion of Alligator River and encompasses smaller communities of Fort Landing, Pot Licker, Pledger Landing, and Goat Neck.

== History ==
The Alligator community dates back to the 1800s when new homes appeared, according to Bridging Generations through Tyrrell County Memories. Historically, the local economy revolved around a seasonal rotation of farming, logging, trapping, and fishing. It was the home and is resting place of planter and slaver Hezekiah Spruill (1732 – 1804).
