= Fairfield Historic District =

Fairfield Historic District may refer to:

- Fairfield Historic District (Fairfield, Connecticut), listed on the NRHP in Connecticut
- Fairfield Avenue Historic District (Bellevue, Kentucky), listed on the NRHP in Kentucky
- Fairfield Historic District (Shreveport, Louisiana), listed on the NRHP in Louisiana
- Fairfield Historic District (Fairfield, North Carolina), listed on the NRHP in North Carolina
- Fairfield Historic District (Fairfield, Pennsylvania), listed on the NRHP in Pennsylvania
