= Nebraska, North Carolina =

- Unincorporated community
- Location within North Carolina Location within the United States
- Coordinates: 35°27′28″N 76°03′48″W
- Country: United States
- State: North Carolina
- County: Hyde
- Elevation: 0 ft (0 m)
- Time zone: UTC-5 (Eastern (EST))
  - Summer (DST): UTC-4 (EDT)
- Area code: 252
- GNIS feature ID: 1021607

Nebraska is an unincorporated community in Hyde County, North Carolina, United States. Nebraska is located in southeastern Hyde County, near the Cape Hatteras National Seashore. The community was established in 1855. While the etymology of its name is unknown, Nebraska may have been named for the Kansas-Nebraska Act.

== Education ==
The local school is Mattamuskeet School of Hyde County Schools.
