= Fairfield, Hyde County, North Carolina =

- Census-designated place
- Location within North Carolina Location within the United States
- Country: United States
- State: North Carolina
- County: Hyde

Area
  - Total: 7.33 sq mi (18.98 km^{2})
  - Land: 7.04 sq mi (18.23 km^{2})
  - Water: 0.29 sq mi (0.75 km^{2})
- Elevation: 3 ft (0.91 m)

Population (2020)
  - Total: 231
  - Density: 32.8/sq mi (12.67/km^{2})
- Time zone: UTC-5 (Eastern (EST))
  - Summer (DST): UTC-4 (EDT)
- ZIP Code: 27826
- Area code: 252
- GNIS feature ID: 1020191
- FIPS code: 37-22280

Fairfield is a census-designated place (CDP) and unincorporated community in Hyde County, North Carolina, United States. As of the 2010 census, it had a population of 258. The Fairfield Historic District was listed on the National Register of Historic Places in 1985.

== Geography ==
Fairfield is in northern Hyde County, on the northern side of Lake Mattamuskeet. North Carolina Highway 94 passes through the community, leading north 28 miles (45 km) to U.S. Route 64 in Columbia and south across the lake 7 miles (11 km) to U.S. Route 264.

According to the U.S. Census Bureau, the Fairfield CDP has a total area of 7.0 square miles (18.2 km^{2}), all land.

== Demographics ==
Historical population
Census	Pop.	Note	%±
2020	231		—
U.S. Decennial Census

=== 2020 census ===
Fairfield racial composition
Race	Number	Percentage
White (non-Hispanic)	118	51.08%
Black or African American (non-Hispanic)	81	35.06%
Pacific Islander	2	0.87%
Other/Mixed	11	4.76%
Hispanic or Latino	19	8.23%

As of the 2020 United States census, there were 231 people, 102 households, and 82 families residing in the CDP.

== Education ==
The local school is Mattamuskeet School of Hyde County Schools.
