= Jerry and Pleasant View, North Carolina =

Jerry and Pleasant View
- Unincorporated communities
- Location within the state of North Carolina
- Coordinates: 35°53′9″N 76°13′47″W
- Country: United States
- State: North Carolina
- County: Tyrrell
- Elevation: 3 ft (0.91 m)
- Time zone: UTC-5 (Eastern (EST))
  - Summer (DST): UTC-4 (EDT)
- ZIP codes: 27925
- Area code: 252
- GNIS feature ID: 1006256

Jerry and Pleasant View are two adjacent unincorporated communities in Tyrrell County, North Carolina, United States; Jerry lies southeast of Pleasant View. Both communities lie at an elevation of 3 feet (1 m). Jerry is located at 35°52′56″N 76°13′37″W (35.8821078, -76.2268719), while Pleasant View is located at 35°53′22″N 76°13′58″W (35.8893301, -76.2327058).
