= Pungo Lake =

Lake in North Carolina

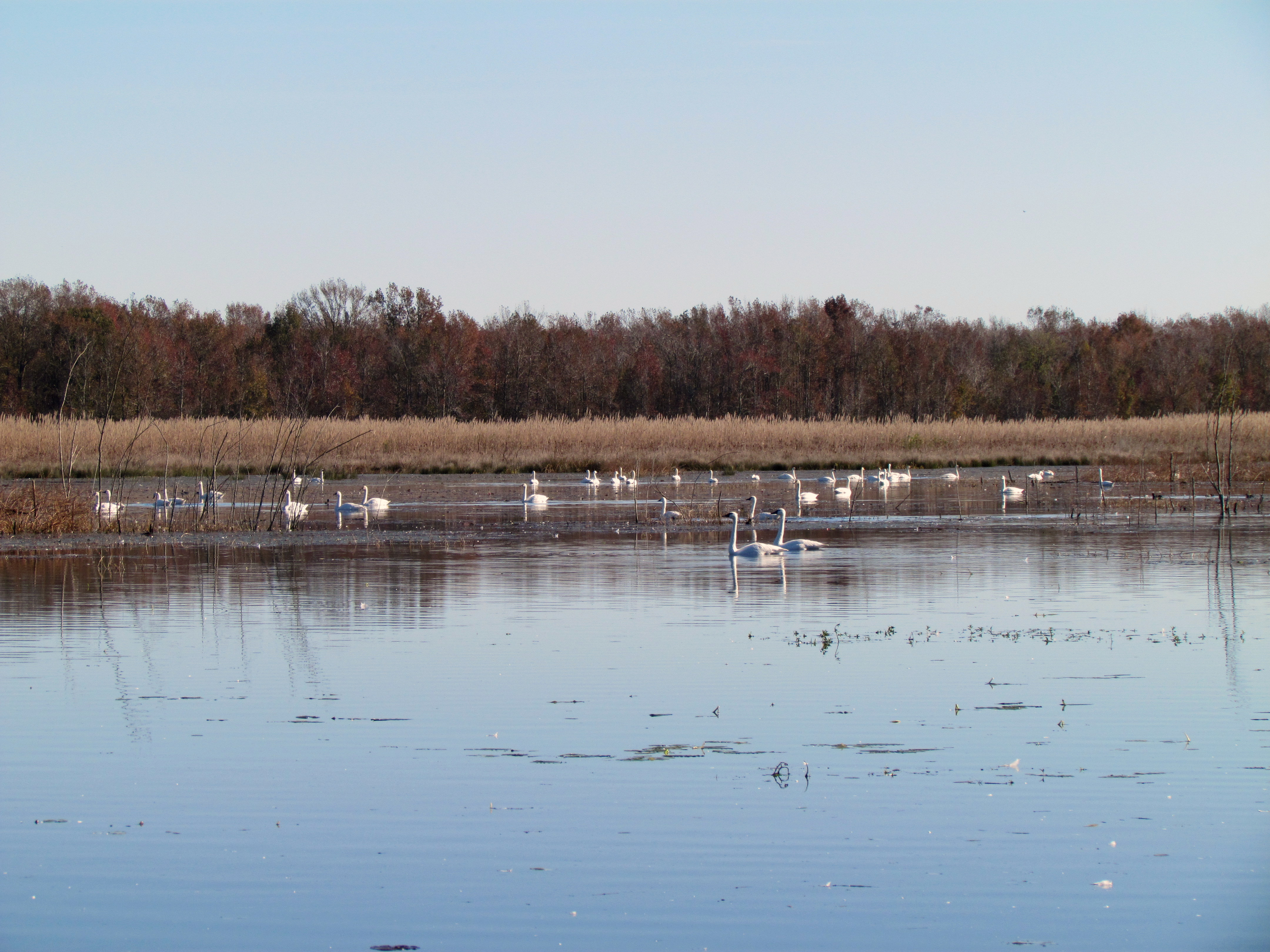
- Tundra swans on Pungo Lake
- Interactive map of Pungo Lake
- Location: Washington County, Hyde County, North Carolina
- Group: Pocosin lakes
- Coordinates: 35.7140686°N 76.5507567°W
- Type: Freshwater lake
- Etymology: Machapunga people
- Max. depth: 6 ft (1.8 m)

Pungo Lake is a shallow freshwater lake in Washington County and Hyde County, North Carolina. The lake has an area of about 2,800 acres, and is one of the five largest freshwater lakes in the state. It is the smallest of the Pocosin Lakes.

== Physical characteristics ==
Pungo Lake is a blackwater lake, with no submerged vegetation due to the fact that sunlight cannot penetrate its waters. The lake is believed to have formed after a ground fire burned peat deposits, creating a large depression which filled with rainwater. The dark water makes the lake appear deeper than it is, though the deepest pits are only about 6’ in depth.

== History ==
The lake was named after the Machapunga people. There were attempts to drain the lake in the 1840s and 1850s via ditches dug by enslaved workers, and it was connected to the Pungo River via a canal. This reduced water levels by about five feet—nearly half of the historical depth. In the mid-twentieth century, additional canals were added to the west of the lake as the region was logged, but there have never been any major settlements around it. Much of the soil surrounding the lake is too peat-rich to be used for agriculture. Around 1200 acres of bordering farmland are cooperatively managed by farmers and the Refuge, with 20% of the corn and winter wheat acreage left standing for overwintering wildlife each year.

== Conservation ==
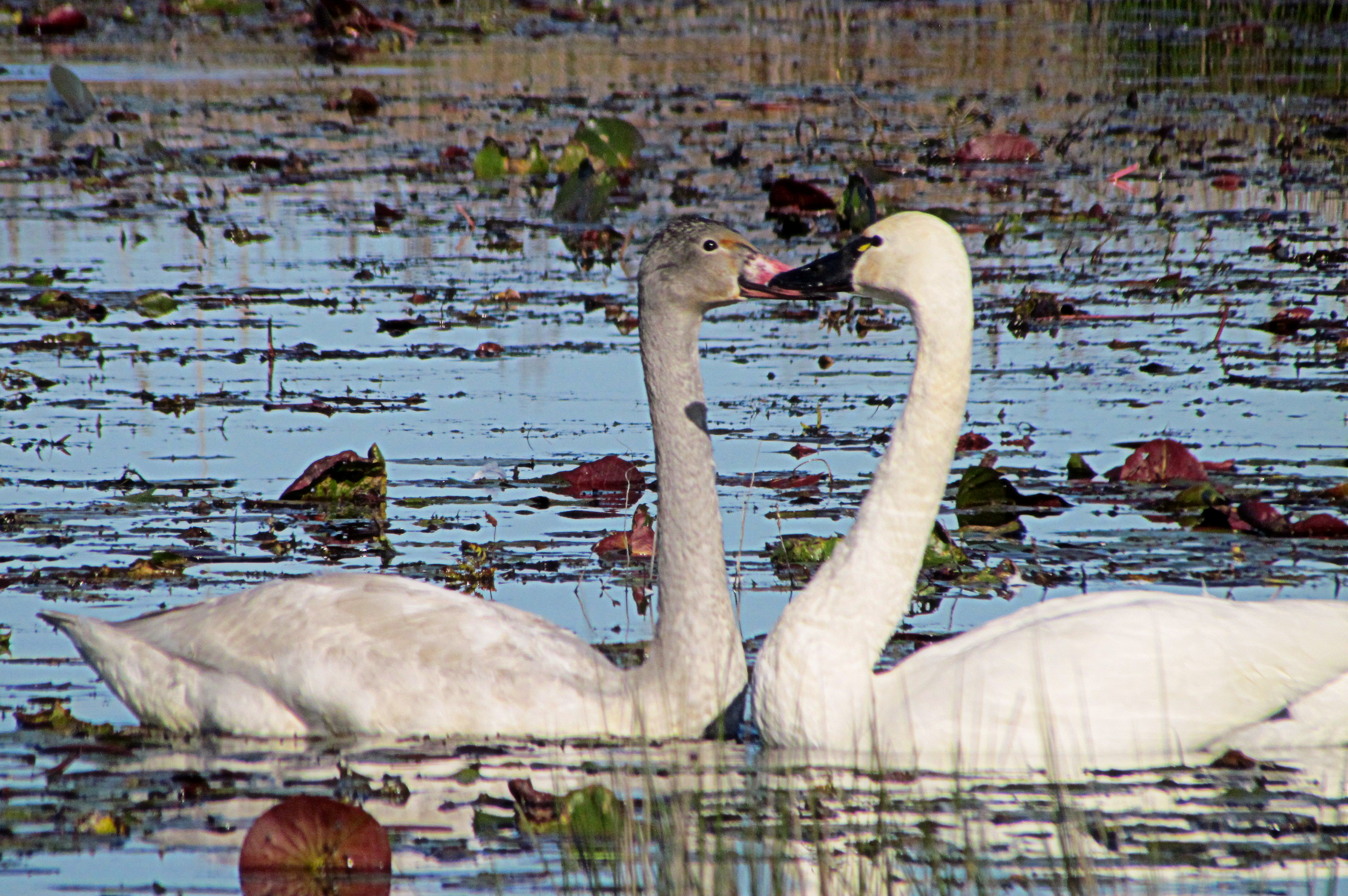
Gray Immature and white adult Tundra Swans Pungo Lake Pocosin Lakes

The lake is a part of the Pungo unit of the Pocosin Lakes National Wildlife Refuge. The lake became a national wildlife refuge in the 1960s, and additional land was included in the refuge in the 1990s. It is a refuge for many migratory bird species, including snow geese, tundra swans. marsh birds, wood ducks, owls, and hawks. Other species that inhabit the Pungo Lake area include red wolves, white-tailed deer, otters, bobcats, and alligators.

Ongoing hydrology restoration of Pungo Lake waterways is managed by the Refuge to reduce artificial drainage of water in what was once a closed lake, fed only by precipitation and drained only by diffusion and evaporation. Most water management infrastructure was installed by 2010. A reforestation program was established in 1999 to restore logged and deeply-burned wildfire areas and ensure Atlantic white cedar and canebrake habitat types are not lost. Prescribed controlled fire is used when the Pungo Lake area is not under drought conditions to mimic the natural fire interval, maintain habitat diversity, propagate native plants, and reduce fuel concentration to prevent future catastrophic wildfire and ground fire damage.
