= Pocosin Lakes National Wildlife Refuge =

National Wildlife Refuge in North Carolina, United States

- IUCN category IV (habitat/species management area)
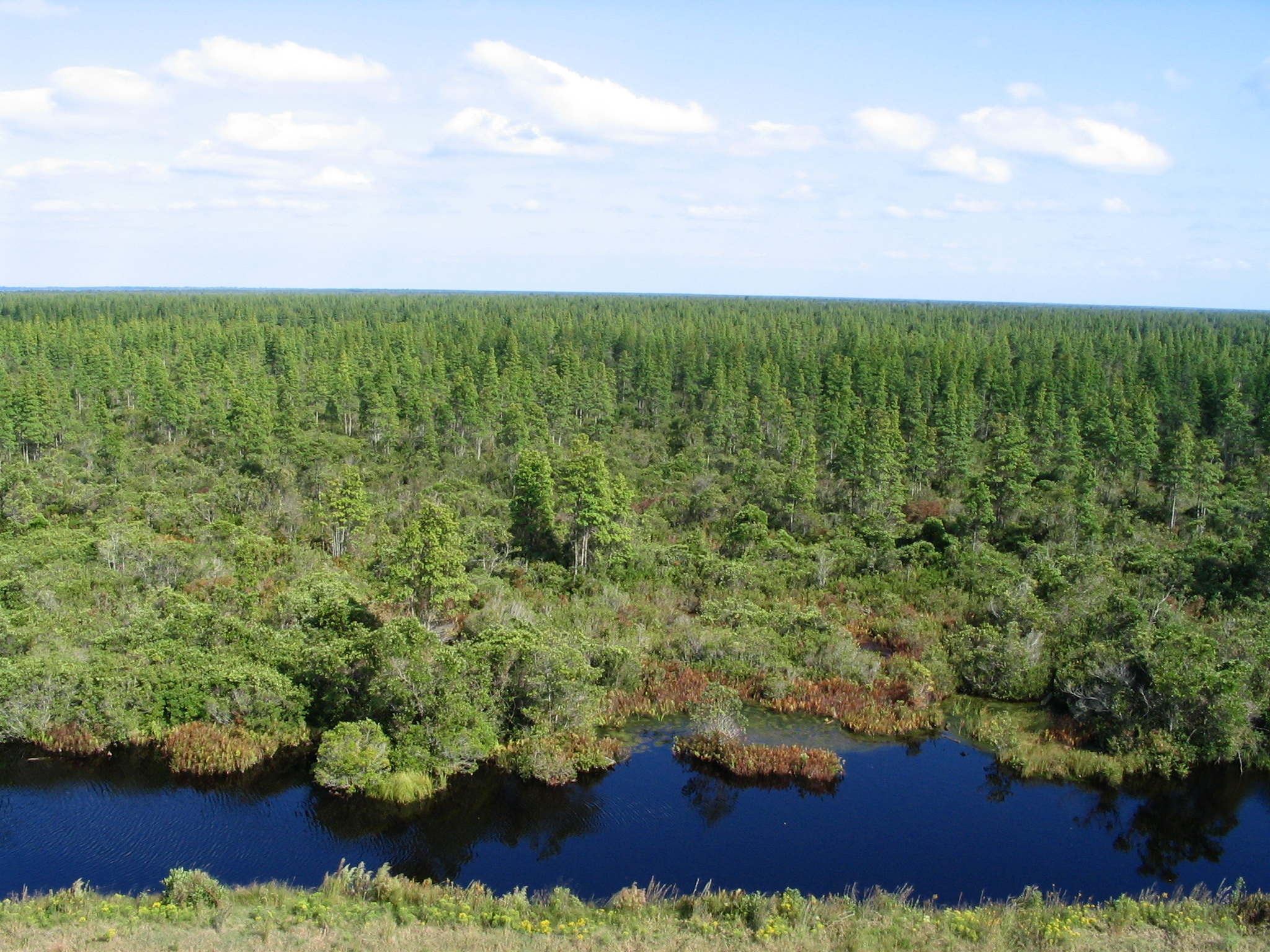
- Looking down on part of Pocosin Lakes National Wildlife Refuge.

- Location within the United States Location within North Carolina
- Location: Hyde, Tyrrell, Washington counties, North Carolina, United States
- Nearest city: Creswell, North Carolina
- Coordinates: 35°45′03″N 76°30′37″W
- Area: 110,106 acres (445.58 km^{2})
- Established: 1963
- Governing body: U.S. Fish and Wildlife Service
- Website: Pocosin Lakes National Wildlife Refuge

The Pocosin Lakes National Wildlife Refuge is located in North Carolina's Inner Banks on the Albemarle-Pamlico Peninsula in Hyde, Tyrrell, and Washington Counties, North Carolina. Its headquarters is located in Columbia.

Pocosin Lakes National Wildlife Refuge (NWR) was established in 1990. Originally, the 12,000-acre (49 km²) southwestern portion of the refuge—now known as the Pungo Unit—was established in 1963 as the Pungo National Wildlife Refuge, but it was merged with Pocosin Lakes in 1990. The refuge now covers 110,106 acres (446 km²), of which approximately 90,000 acres (364 km²) were donated. The refuge is named for the pocosin peat wetlands that make up the majority of the protected habitat.

This refuge is home to indigenous animals such as the black bear, alligator, two species of fox, bobcat, raccoon, coyote, opossum, beaver, river otter, mink, and red wolf. It was the site chosen for the reintroduction of the endangered red wolf in 1987. It is located along the Atlantic Flyway and is home to more than 200 species of birds.

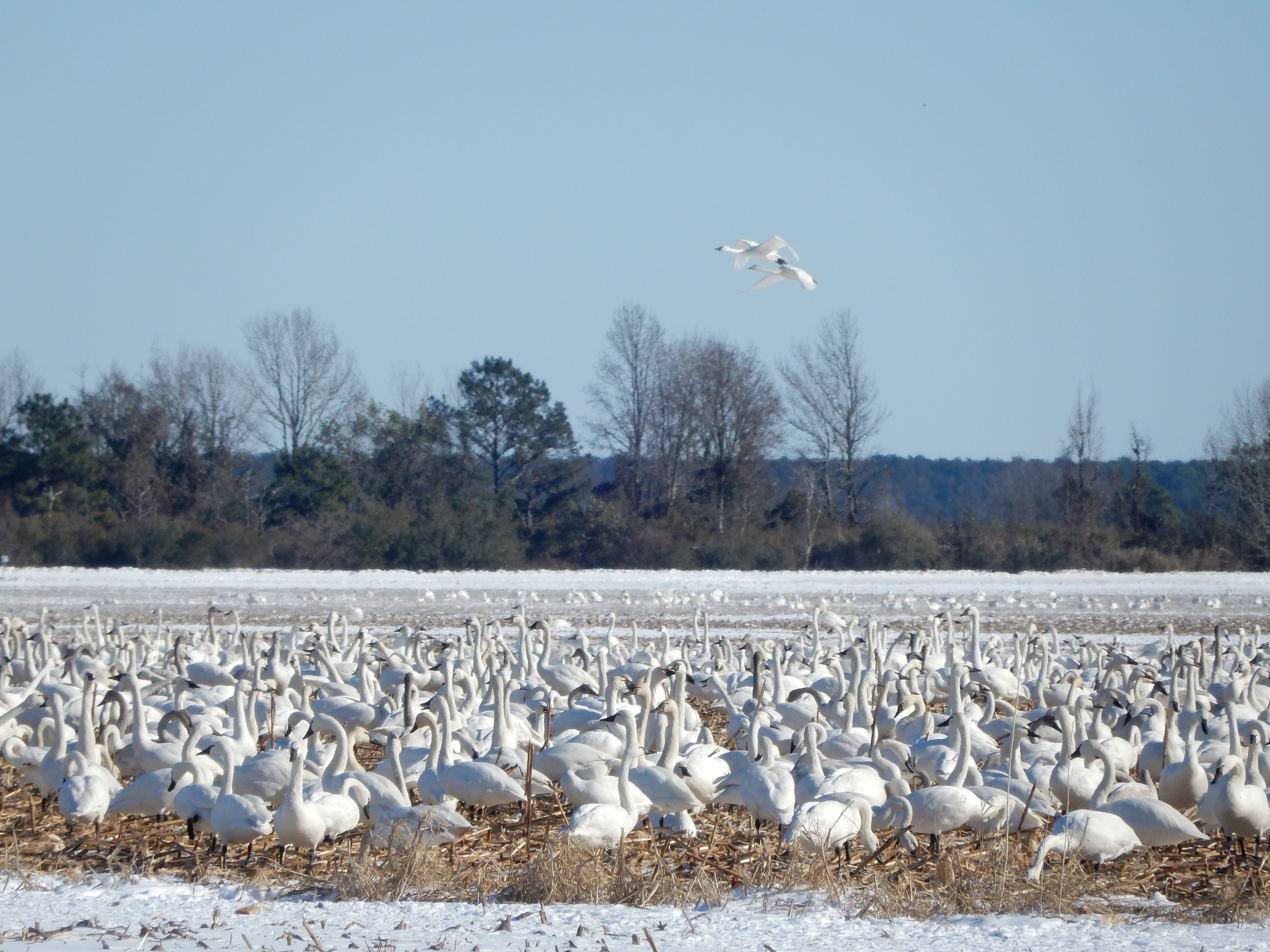
Tundra swans overwintering in a field in the Pungo Lake unit of Pocosin Lakes NWR.

The Pungo Lake unit is a notable overwintering site for Tundra swans, snow geese, and many species of ducks (including rare species like northern shovelers and hooded mergansers), with about 100,000 waterfowl in residence between November and January.

== Ecology and conservation ==
Nearly one-third of the refuge is currently undergoing hydrology restoration.

Research at the refuge has found that hydrologic conditions can strongly affect carbon storage in pocosin peatlands. Drained peatlands can lose carbon through increased decomposition, while rewetting can substantially reduce carbon dioxide losses. A 2023 study at Pocosin Lakes National Wildlife Refuge found that restoring water levels reduced carbon dioxide losses by more than 90% when the water table was raised from about 60 cm to 30 cm below the surface. The researchers also found that wetter conditions could allow the peatlands to become a net carbon sink.

=== Past wildfires ===
Two notable wildfires have burned within the Pocosin Lakes NWR since its protection. In April 1985, the Allen Road Fire ignited in the refuge, burning nearly 100,000 acres over three weeks and requiring assistance from the Marines to extinguish the peat 'ground fires' it left in its wake. On June 1, 2008, lightning struck the refuge and started a wildfire known as the Evans Road Fire that had, as of 17 September 2008, spread to about 40,704 acres (164.72 km^{2}), and burned much of the same land before it was completely contained. The fire was declared out on January 9, 2009.

Wildfires can also have significant effects on the carbon stored in pocosin peatlands. When peatlands are drained, the lower water table makes the organic soils more vulnerable to decomposition and deep peat fires. Drained pocosin peatlands can experience substantial carbon losses, while rewetting can reduce those losses. A study also found that deep peat fires can release large amounts of greenhouse gases.

== History ==
=== Indigenous occupants ===
Human presence in the Pocosin Lakes region likely dates back as many as 10,000 years. Though little systematic archaeological investigation of the Pocosin Lakes NWR has been undertaken, the adjacent Phelps Lake was found to contain more than 30 dugout canoes, some as many as 4,400 years old. Indigenous people likely lived nearby, and accounts from early in the refuge's documented history mention the presence of various Native American artifacts on the shores of Pungo Lake. The region was populated by tribes of Algonquian peoples up until the late Woodland period. The word "pocosin" comes from an Algonquian language, although its precise meaning is uncertain. A commonly repeated translation of the word as "swamp on a hill" is not supported by sufficient historical evidence. While tribal organization and boundaries changed rapidly during the era of colonization, as conflict and disease inflicted high mortality rates on indigenous peoples, the Secotan and Machapunga tribes are both recorded in the area. The Machapunga people and Pungo Lake may share name roots; an 1888 account of a group of displaced "Mattamuskeet Indians" in Robeson County reports that they referred to Pungo Lake as Mattapungo.

=== Colonization and development ===
Following European colonization, the pocosin lakes were quickly modified and developed in an attempt to expand available crop land. In 1840, the state (via its agent "The Literary Board") began a decade-long attempt to drain Pungo Lake in what is now the Pocosin Lakes NWR. A 25-foot-wide canal was excavated by enslaved people, who worked knee-deep in water and were housed in "shanties" along the edges of the canals. Though efforts to drain the lake were eventually abandoned when little usable land was revealed, the canal construction did drop the lake's surface level by at least 5 feet, and the Pungo Lake Canal still extends from the lake to the Pungo River. A network of further canals were excavated in the area by a process of burning and dredging to increase logging access throughout the early twentieth century.

Historical drainage and land-use changes altered the natural hydrology of the pocosin wetlands. These changes lowered water levels and affected the ability of the peatlands to store carbon, contributing to the need for hydrologic restoration.

== Representation in media and art ==
- Composer Kenneth Frazelle wrote a piece called "“The Swans at Pungo Lake" for the North Carolina Symphony in 2006.
