= George V. Credle House and Cemetery =

Historic house in North Carolina, United States

- U.S. National Register of Historic Places
- U.S. Historic district
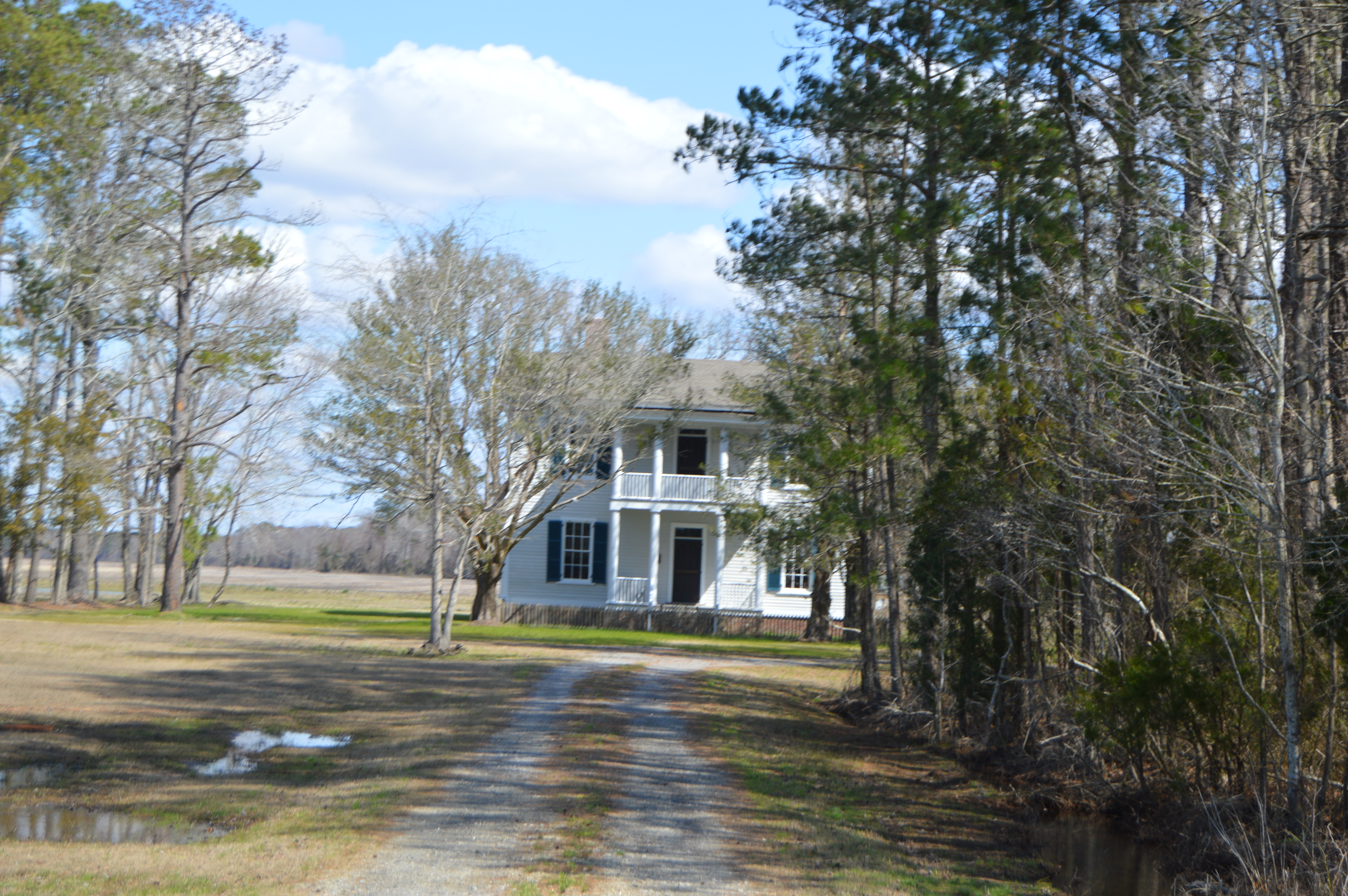
- Driveway view

- Location within North Carolina Location within the United States
- Location: U.S. Route 264, near Rose Bay, North Carolina
- Coordinates: 35°27′10″N 35°27′10″E
- Area: 39.5 acres (16.0 ha)
- Built: 1852
- Architectural style: Greek Revival
- NRHP reference No.: 85001670
- Added to NRHP: July 29, 1985

George V. Credle House and Cemetery is a historic plantation house and cemetery and national historic district located near Rose Bay, Hyde County, North Carolina. The house was built about 1852, and is a two-story Greek Revival style weatherboarded frame dwelling. It features fluted porch columns, molded corner boards, a plain frieze, and a low gable roof. Also on the property are a contributing smokehouse and small family cemetery.

It was added to the National Register of Historic Places in 1985.
