= Mitchell jail fire =

2002 fire in Mitchell County jail in North Carolina, USA

- Date: May 3, 2002
- Venue: Mitchell County jail
- Location: Bakersville, North Carolina, United States; 36.0130°N 82.1545°W
- Type: Fire
- Deaths: 8
- Injuries: 13

On Friday, May 3, 2002, a fire broke out at the Mitchell County jail in Bakersville, North Carolina. Bakersville is located northeast of Asheville, North Carolina, and has a population of less than 500. The jail, built in the 1950s, held 17 inmates; some were serving time for misdemeanors and others were awaiting trial on felonies.

== Sources ==
- Nowell, Paul. "N.C. Jail Fire kills eight inmates." Associated Press May 5, 2002.
- Hall, Nathan. "County veiled in sadness." Mitchell News Journal May 8, 2002.
- North Carolina Industrial Commission. Robinson v. Dept. of Health and Human Services. Civil Tort Counterclaim. March 2, 2009. Raleigh.
- New York Times "Fire Kills Eight Inmates Trapped in a North Carolina Jail" May 5, 2002, Section 1, Page 33 https://www.nytimes.com/2002/05/05/us/fire-kills-eight-inmates-trapped-in-a-north-carolina-jail.html
