= Swanquarter Wilderness =

Wilderness area in North Carolina, United States

- IUCN category Ib (wilderness area)
- Location within the United States Location within North Carolina
- Location: Hyde County, North Carolina, USA
- Nearest city: Swanquarter, North Carolina
- Coordinates: 35°21′28″N 076°16′58″W
- Area: 8,785 acres (36 km^{2})
- Designation: 1976
- Designated: Wilderness Area
- Governing body: United States Fish and Wildlife Service
- Website: Swanquarter National Wildlife Refuge

Swanquarter Wilderness was designated in 1976, and it covers 8,785 acres (36 km^{2}) in the Swanquarter National Wildlife Refuge in eastern North Carolina.

The most prevalent bird wintering species residing in refuge marshes include northern pintail, green-winged teal, gadwall, American wigeon, mallard, and American black duck. Large “rafts” of black scoter and lesser scaup are commonly observed on the open waters adjacent to the refuge. Other species wintering or migrating on the refuge and surrounding waters may include blue-winged teal, ring-necked duck, northern shoveler, canvasback, ruddy duck, redhead, bufflehead, hooded merganser, and red-breasted merganser. Both migratory Canada geese and snow geese seasonally use this refuge. The species that breed on the refuge are characteristic of species that inhabit other coastal plain communities. They include warblers, nuthatches, thrashers, and blue-gray gnatcatchers. Wading birds such as the great blue heron are commonly seen by visitors. Their breeding has been documented in at least one rookery on this refuge. Bald eagles and ospreys have also historically nested on the refuge and viable nests remain. The most common winter bird species are the American robin, yellow-rumped warbler, red-winged blackbird and sparrows. Robins feed heavily on berries of red bay and greenbrier and roost in large concentrations along the ditches. Myrtle warblers use vegetated ditch banks, and forest edges. They feed heavily on wax myrtle berries. The northern harrier may be observed hunting over the marshes.

Mammalian species of black bear and white-tailed deer range over the entire refuge. They are hunted on this refuge's adjacent property.

== See also ==
- List of U.S. Wilderness Areas
- Wilderness Act
