= Swanquarter National Wildlife Refuge =

National Wildlife Refuge in North Carolina, United States

- IUCN category IV (habitat/species management area)
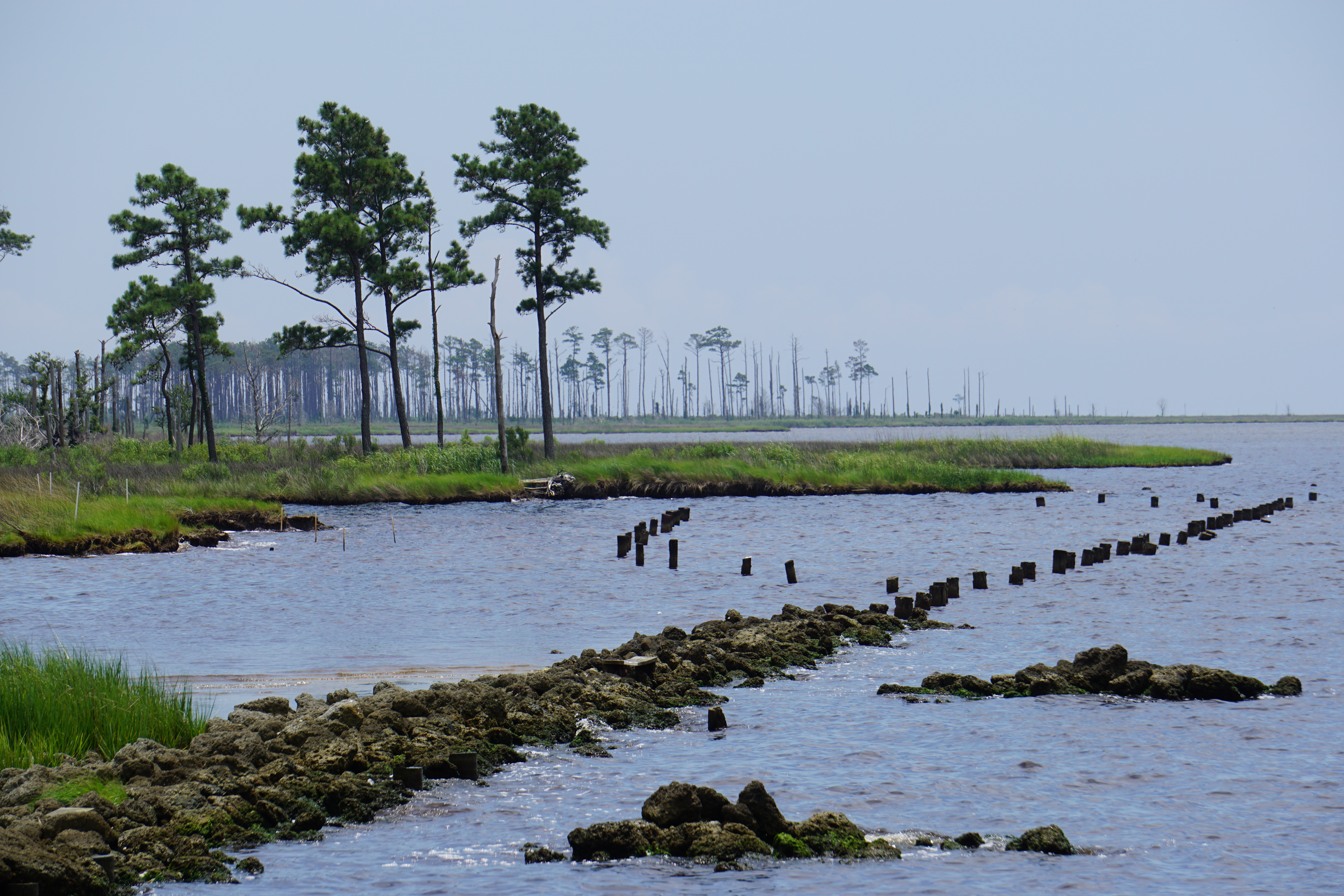
- Wetlands at Swanquarter National Wildlife Refuge

- Location within the United States Location within North Carolina
- Location: Hyde County, North Carolina, United States
- Nearest city: Swan Quarter, North Carolina
- Coordinates: 35°22′00″N 76°19′30″W
- Area: 16,411 acres (66.41 km^{2})
- Established: 1932
- Governing body: U.S. Fish and Wildlife Service
- Website: Swanquarter National Wildlife Refuge

The Swanquarter National Wildlife Refuge is located in Hyde County, North Carolina near the village of Swan Quarter. The area is a federally protected land and home to many species of wildlife and waterfowl. The refuge is administered from the nearby Mattamuskeet National Wildlife Refuge. The refuge has a total area of 16,411 acres (66.41 km^{2}).

The bird species that breed on the refuge are characteristic of species that inhabit other coastal plain communities. They include warblers, nuthatches, thrashers, and blue-gray gnatcatchers. Wading birds, such as the great blue heron are common and breeding has been documented in at least one rookery on this refuge. Bald eagles and ospreys have also historically nested on the refuge and viable nests remain. The most common winter bird species are the American robin, yellow-rumped warbler, the red-winged blackbird, and sparrows. Robins feed heavily on berries of red bay and greenbrier and roost in large concentrations along the ditches. Myrtle warblers use vegetated ditch banks, and forest edges. They feed heavily on wax myrtle berries. The northern harrier may be observed hunting over the marshes.

Mammalian species of black bear and white-tailed deer range over the entire refuge. They are not hunted on this refuge, but are hunted on its adjacent property. The refuge is also home to american alligators.

Approximately half the refuge was designated a part of Swanquarter Wilderness.

Great Island, located in the Pamlico Sound, is located entirely within the wildlife refuge.
