= Germantown, North Carolina =

Unincorporated community in North Carolina, US

Coordinates: 35.43167°N 76.46333°W

Germantown is an unincorporated community in Hyde County, North Carolina, United States.

The community is at the intersection of Swindell and German Town Roads. Germantown is approximately 52.66 miles east-southeast of Greenville, 44 miles southeast of Williamston and 240.4 miles south-southeast of Washington, D.C., at an elevation of approximately four feet above mean sea level.

== History ==
German Town Road was renamed by the USPS with the advent of 911 addresses. Germantown was the Hyde County seat in the late 1700s into the early 1800s.

Originally named for English colonist Bernard Germain, it was called Germain Town until the name was conscripted by the timber industry from Pennsylvania in the late 1800s, which is also when Scranton NC was renamed, to make the German Americans and the Mennonites more comfortable being transported south to cut down the Cypress Trees and clear the swamps.

== Demographics ==
As of 9 January 2021, there is only one permanent resident of what can at best be described as the remnants of a neighborhood, not a village, and it is a mere coincidence that she happens to be of German American descent.
