= Fairfield Historic District (Fairfield, North Carolina) =

Historic district in North Carolina, United States

- U.S. National Register of Historic Places
- U.S. Historic district
- Location within North Carolina Location within the United States
- Location: SR 1308, 1309, 1305 and NC 94, Fairfield, North Carolina
- Coordinates: 35°32′29″N 76°13′39″W
- Area: 210 acres (85 ha)
- Architect: Multiple
- Architectural style: Italianate, Carpenter Gothic
- NRHP reference No.: 85001448
- Added to NRHP: July 5, 1985

Merge to Fairfield, Hyde County, North Carolina?

Fairfield Historic District is a national historic district located at Fairfield, Hyde County, North Carolina. The district encompasses 54 contributing buildings, 1 contributing site, and 1 contributing structure in the village of Fairfield. The district includes notable examples of Italianate and Carpenter Gothic style architecture dating to the last half of the 19th century. It was added to the National Register of Historic Places in 1985.

Notable buildings include the Blackwell-Carter-Midyette House (1850s), Dr. Patrick Simmons House (1871), Carter~Holton-Sears House (c. 1890), Fairfield Methodist Episcopal Church (1877), E. S. O'Neal And Sons Store, Calhoun Brown Store, Fairfield Cemetery Pavilion, and Carter-Swindell House (1870s).
