= 1912 United States presidential election in North Carolina =

- November 5, 1912

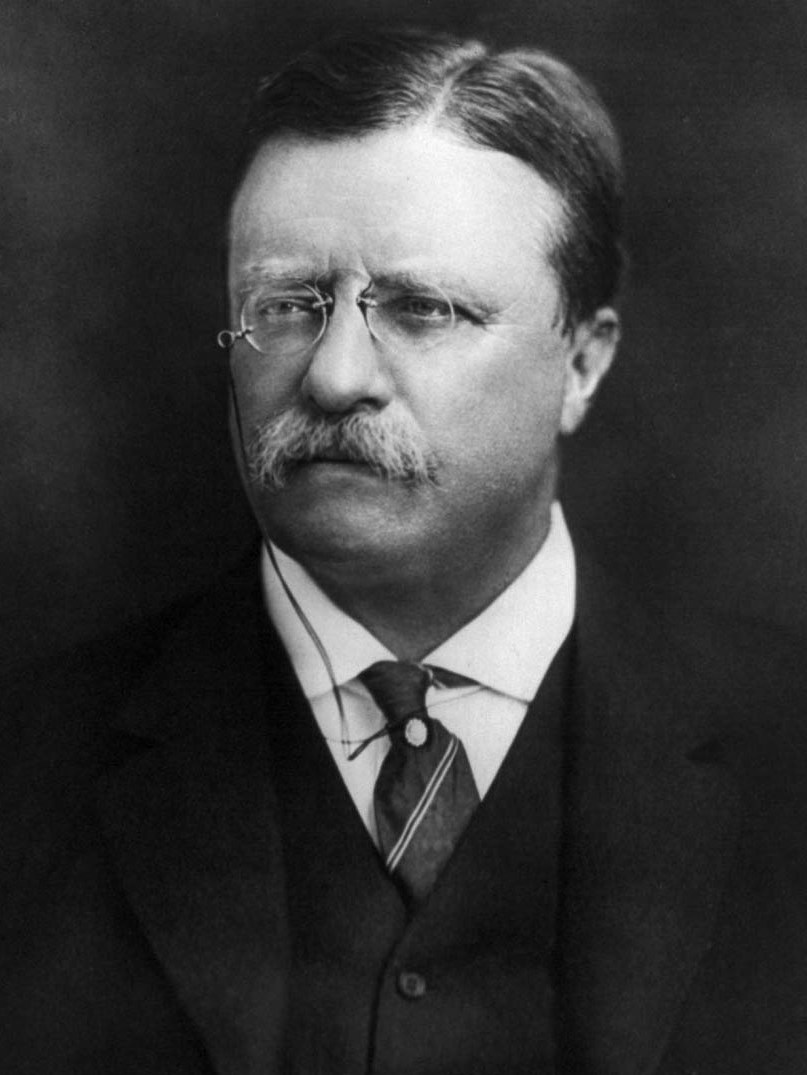

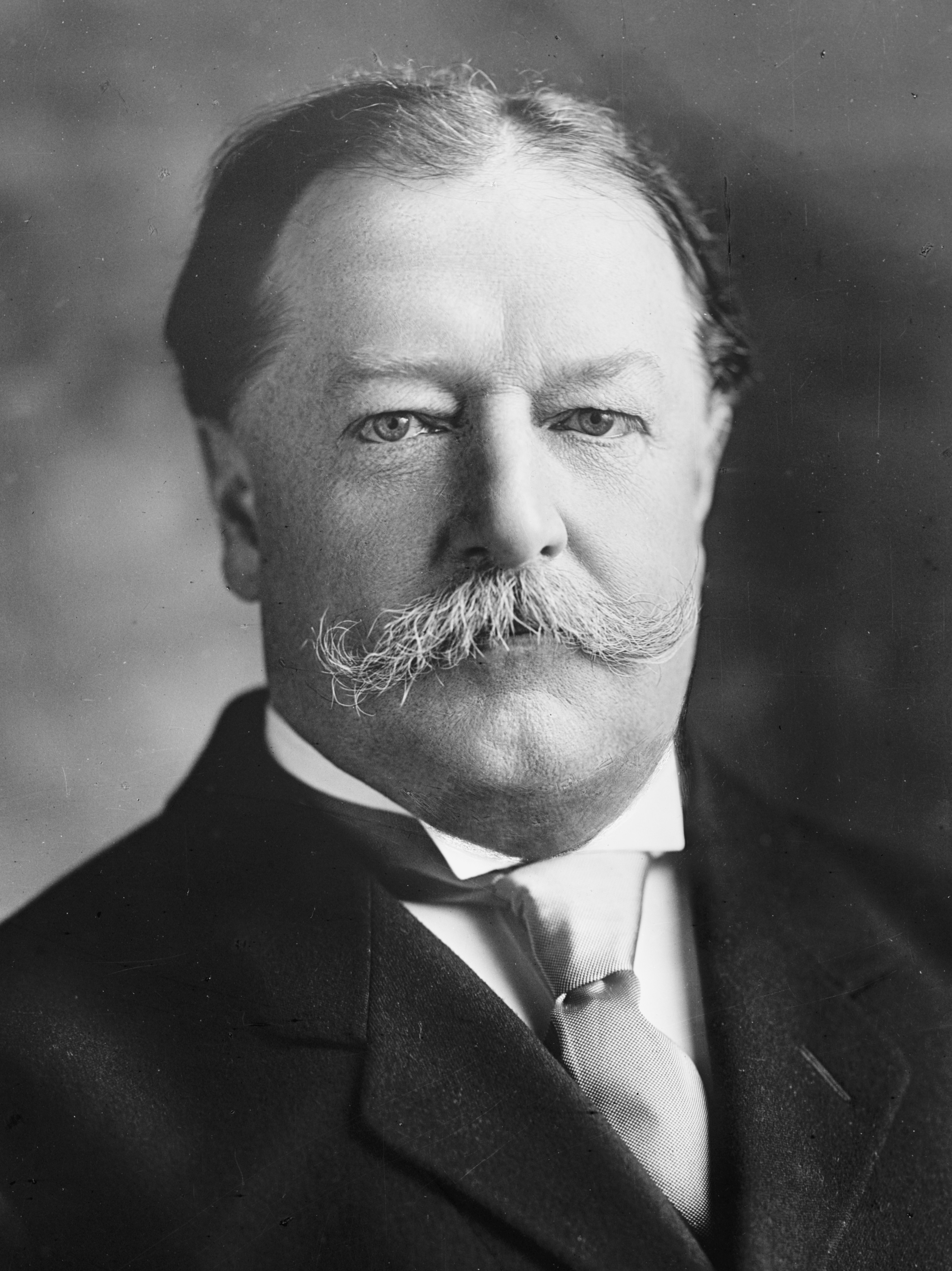
Nominee	Woodrow Wilson	Theodore Roosevelt	William Howard Taft
Party	Democratic	Progressive	Republican
Home state	New Jersey	New York	Ohio
Running mate	Thomas R. Marshall	Hiram Johnson	Nicholas Murray Butler
Electoral vote	12	0	0
Popular vote	133,021	69,130	29,139
Percentage	59.24%	28.34%	11.95%
County results
Wilson
40–50%
50–60%
60–70%
70–80%
80–90%
90–100%
Roosevelt
40–50%
50–60%
60–70%
70–80%
Taft
30–40%
40–50%
50–60%
President before election
William Howard Taft
Republican
Elected President
Woodrow Wilson
Democratic

The 1912 United States presidential election in North Carolina took place on November 5, 1912, as part of the 1912 United States presidential election. North Carolina voters chose 12 representatives, or electors, to the Electoral College, who voted for president and vice president. Like all former Confederate states, North Carolina would during its “Redemption” develop a politics based upon Jim Crow laws, disfranchisement of its African-American population and dominance of the Democratic Party. However, unlike the Deep South, the Republican Party possessed sufficient historic Unionist white support from the mountains and northwestern Piedmont to gain a stable one-third of the statewide vote total in general elections even after blacks lost the right to vote.

Following the Wilmington massacre in 1898 and the collapse of its interracial coalition with the Populist Party, North Carolina's GOP turned extremely rapidly towards a “lily-white” strategy that went sufficiently far as to exclude blacks from the state party altogether. Incumbent President Taft had been in October 1908 the first Republican candidate to tour the South. Aided by opposition by developing manufacturers to prevalent Democratic populism, and his willingness to accept black disfranchisement and even exclusion from the state GOP, Taft improved the Republican performance, especially in previously Democratic western and Piedmont counties.

North Carolina was won by Princeton University President Woodrow Wilson (D–Virginia), running with governor of Indiana Thomas R. Marshall, with 59.24 percent of the popular vote, against the 26th president of the United States Theodore Roosevelt (P–New York), running with governor of California Hiram Johnson, with 28.34 percent of the popular vote and the 27th president of the United States William Howard Taft (R–Ohio), running with Columbia University President Nicholas Murray Butler, with 11.95 percent of the popular vote. As of the 2020 presidential election, this is the last election in which Wilkes County, Avery County, and Mitchell County did not support the Republican candidate.

== Results ==
1912 United States presidential election in North Carolina
Party	Candidate	Votes	%
Democratic	Woodrow Wilson	144,507	59.24%
Progressive	Theodore Roosevelt	69,130	28.34%
Republican	William Howard Taft (incumbent)	29,139	11.95%
Socialist	Eugene V. Debs	1,025	0.42%
Prohibition	Eugene W. Chafin	117	0.05%
Total votes		243,918	100%

=== Results by county ===
1912 United States presidential election in North Carolina by county
County	Woodrow Wilson Democratic		William Howard Taft Republican		Theodore Roosevelt Progressive "Bull Moose"		Eugene V. Debs Socialist		Eugene W. Chafin Prohibition		Margin (Note: Because Roosevelt finished second behind Wilson in North Carolina as a whole, all percentage margins are Wilson percentage minus Roosevelt percentage and vote margins Wilson vote total minus Roosevelt vote total unless states otherwise for the county in question.)	
County	%	#	%	#	%	#	%	#	%	#	%	#
Currituck	97.80%	622	0.94%	6	1.26%	8	0.00%	0	0.00%	0	96.54%	614
Northampton	93.66%	1,625	3.29%	57	3.05%	53	0.00%	0	0.00%	0	90.37% (Note: In this county where Roosevelt did run third behind both Wilson and Taft, percentage margin given is Wilson percentage minus Taft percentage and vote margin Wilson vote minus Taft vote.)	1,568
Bertie	93.79%	1,571	2.57%	43	3.64%	61	0.00%	0	0.00%	0	90.15%	1,510
Halifax	92.85%	2,300	1.70%	42	5.45%	135	0.00%	0	0.00%	0	87.40%	2,165
Edgecombe	89.03%	1,851	4.91%	102	3.70%	77	2.36%	49	0.00%	0	84.13%	1,749
New Hanover	89.11%	2,021	6.17%	140	4.72%	107	0.00%	0	0.00%	0	82.94%	1,881
Warren	86.20%	987	9.78%	112	4.02%	46	0.00%	0	0.00%	0	76.42%	875
Scotland	89.94%	751	1.08%	9	8.98%	75	0.00%	0	0.00%	0	80.96%	676
Hoke	85.87%	626	8.64%	63	5.49%	40	0.00%	0	0.00%	0	77.23%	563
Martin	82.63%	1,251	15.13%	229	2.25%	34	0.00%	0	0.00%	0	67.50%	1,022
Anson	85.95%	1,487	7.23%	125	6.82%	118	0.00%	0	0.00%	0	78.73%	1,362
Craven	87.12%	1,819	3.78%	79	9.10%	190	0.00%	0	0.00%	0	78.02%	1,629
Chowan	82.88%	663	7.50%	60	9.63%	77	0.00%	0	0.00%	0	73.25%	586
Caswell	77.99%	705	17.04%	154	4.98%	45	0.00%	0	0.00%	0	60.95%	551
Richmond	83.17%	1,319	5.17%	82	10.97%	174	0.19%	3	0.50%	8	72.19%	1,145
Mecklenburg	82.27%	3,967	5.89%	284	11.05%	533	0.79%	38	0.00%	0	71.22%	3,434
Hertford	81.72%	742	6.72%	61	11.56%	105	0.00%	0	0.00%	0	70.15%	637
Franklin	81.62%	1,856	3.12%	71	15.22%	346	0.04%	1	0.00%	0	66.40%	1,510
Perquimans	70.40%	647	24.81%	228	4.79%	44	0.00%	0	0.00%	0	45.59%	419
Jones	79.87%	635	4.40%	35	15.72%	125	0.00%	0	0.00%	0	64.15%	510
Pasquotank	78.83%	972	6.24%	77	14.92%	184	0.00%	0	0.00%	0	63.91%	788
Greene	76.41%	894	10.60%	124	12.99%	152	0.00%	0	0.00%	0	63.42%	742
Pitt	74.63%	2,303	11.24%	347	14.03%	433	0.10%	3	0.00%	0	60.60%	1,870
Vance	74.97%	1,204	10.46%	168	14.57%	234	0.00%	0	0.00%	0	60.40%	970
Lenoir	76.98%	1,568	5.99%	122	17.03%	347	0.00%	0	0.00%	0	59.94%	1,221
Camden	74.81%	303	9.88%	40	15.31%	62	0.00%	0	0.00%	0	59.51%	241
Lee	62.78%	862	32.85%	451	4.37%	60	0.00%	0	0.00%	0	29.93%	411
Robeson	76.88%	2,706	4.38%	154	18.75%	660	0.00%	0	0.00%	0	58.13%	2,046
Granville	74.48%	1,561	9.16%	192	16.36%	343	0.00%	0	0.00%	0	58.11%	1,218
Union	75.87%	1,786	3.91%	92	19.41%	457	0.81%	19	0.00%	0	56.46%	1,329
Pender	77.11%	967	1.52%	19	21.37%	268	0.00%	0	0.00%	0	55.74%	699
Wilson	73.03%	1,741	3.44%	82	23.53%	561	0.00%	0	0.00%	0	49.50%	1,180
Gates	69.28%	618	10.65%	95	20.07%	179	0.00%	0	0.00%	0	49.22%	439
Nash	70.21%	1,862	6.49%	172	21.72%	576	1.58%	42	0.00%	0	48.49%	1,286
Dare	55.52%	397	33.29%	238	11.19%	80	0.00%	0	0.00%	0	22.24%	159
Wake	68.81%	3,996	4.86%	282	26.12%	1,517	0.21%	12	0.00%	0	42.69%	2,479
Beaufort	63.97%	1,605	11.76%	295	21.84%	548	2.43%	61	0.00%	0	42.13%	1,057
Cleveland	69.66%	2,351	2.40%	81	27.94%	943	0.00%	0	0.00%	0	41.72%	1,408
Bladen	67.70%	1,140	1.96%	33	30.34%	511	0.00%	0	0.00%	0	37.35%	629
Iredell	63.69%	2,528	9.88%	392	26.38%	1,047	0.00%	0	0.05%	2	37.31%	1,481
Haywood	62.88%	2,068	10.76%	354	26.18%	861	0.18%	6	0.00%	0	36.70%	1,207
Person	45.86%	820	43.85%	784	10.29%	184	0.00%	0	0.00%	0	2.01%	36
Alleghany	58.42%	652	18.64%	208	22.94%	256	0.00%	0	0.00%	0	35.48%	396
Wayne	65.46%	2,293	2.71%	95	31.12%	1,090	0.46%	16	0.26%	9	34.34%	1,203
Washington	48.55%	503	37.07%	384	14.38%	149	0.00%	0	0.00%	0	11.49%	119
Rockingham	56.01%	1,939	20.05%	694	22.47%	778	1.47%	51	0.00%	0	33.54%	1,161
Hyde	62.85%	636	7.51%	76	29.64%	300	0.00%	0	0.00%	0	33.20%	336
Stokes	40.48%	1,144	51.31%	1,450	7.43%	210	0.78%	22	0.00%	0	-10.83%	-306
Pamlico	62.13%	694	6.62%	74	29.45%	329	1.79%	20	0.00%	0	32.68%	365
Johnston	53.28%	2,757	25.80%	1,335	20.93%	1,083	0.00%	0	0.00%	0	27.48%	1,422
Carteret	60.43%	1,153	11.43%	218	28.14%	537	0.00%	0	0.00%	0	32.29%	616
Tyrrell	47.52%	297	35.84%	224	16.00%	100	0.64%	4	0.00%	0	11.68%	73
Henderson	48.00%	1,092	35.21%	801	16.70%	380	0.09%	2	0.00%	0	12.79%	291
Guilford	60.43%	3,830	7.26%	460	31.22%	1,979	0.68%	43	0.41%	26	29.20%	1,851
Cumberland	60.08%	1,678	8.41%	235	31.15%	870	0.36%	10	0.00%	0	28.93%	808
Columbus	61.44%	1,668	5.71%	155	32.85%	892	0.00%	0	0.00%	0	28.58%	776
Durham	62.31%	2,197	3.52%	124	34.15%	1,204	0.03%	1	0.00%	0	28.16%	993
Forsyth	48.12%	3,042	26.72%	1,689	19.96%	1,262	5.14%	325	0.06%	4	21.40%	1,353
Surry	39.94%	1,919	47.39%	2,277	12.65%	608	0.00%	0	0.02%	1	-7.45%	-358
Gaston	59.45%	2,333	6.22%	244	32.59%	1,279	1.17%	46	0.56%	22	26.86%	1,054
Rowan	59.43%	2,748	6.06%	280	33.24%	1,537	1.08%	50	0.19%	9	26.19%	1,211
Davidson	48.16%	2,484	29.26%	1,509	22.16%	1,143	0.19%	10	0.23%	12	18.90%	975
Duplin	61.46%	1,757	1.15%	33	37.29%	1,066	0.10%	3	0.00%	0	24.17%	691
Davie	41.59%	823	40.93%	810	17.43%	345	0.00%	0	0.05%	1	0.66%	13
Onslow	59.39%	901	4.35%	66	36.26%	550	0.00%	0	0.00%	0	23.14%	351
Moore	55.20%	1,167	11.92%	252	32.07%	678	0.80%	17	0.00%	0	23.13%	489
Buncombe	56.92%	3,716	6.53%	426	35.00%	2,285	1.55%	101	0.00%	0	21.92%	1,431
Graham	46.22%	416	29.00%	261	24.78%	223	0.00%	0	0.00%	0	17.22%	155
Jackson	53.56%	1,210	13.94%	315	32.27%	729	0.22%	5	0.00%	0	21.29%	481
Brunswick	51.35%	777	18.51%	280	30.14%	456	0.00%	0	0.00%	0	21.22%	321
Cherokee	42.80%	906	34.67%	734	22.53%	477	0.00%	0	0.00%	0	8.12%	172
Alexander	45.51%	852	27.94%	523	26.55%	497	0.00%	0	0.00%	0	17.57%	329
Randolph	54.95%	2,665	7.63%	370	37.30%	1,809	0.12%	6	0.00%	0	17.65%	856
Rutherford	56.93%	2,180	2.14%	82	40.56%	1,553	0.18%	7	0.18%	7	16.38%	627
Caldwell	49.50%	1,627	14.66%	482	35.50%	1,167	0.33%	11	0.00%	0	13.99%	460
Polk	50.75%	675	11.50%	153	37.67%	501	0.08%	1	0.00%	0	13.08%	174
Harnett	53.43%	1,364	5.80%	148	40.54%	1,035	0.20%	5	0.04%	1	12.89%	329
Alamance	54.26%	2,132	3.82%	150	41.66%	1,637	0.25%	10	0.00%	0	12.60%	495
McDowell	47.94%	1,037	15.86%	343	35.74%	773	0.46%	10	0.00%	0	12.21%	264
Ashe	48.86%	1,643	14.21%	478	36.90%	1,241	0.03%	1	0.00%	0	11.95%	402
Chatham	53.86%	1,652	2.28%	70	43.79%	1,343	0.07%	2	0.00%	0	10.07%	309
Macon	51.13%	1,020	6.72%	134	42.16%	841	0.00%	0	0.00%	0	8.97%	179
Lincoln	53.11%	1,280	2.03%	49	44.23%	1,066	0.12%	3	0.50%	12	8.88%	214
Orange	50.00%	997	8.63%	172	41.17%	821	0.20%	4	0.00%	0	8.83%	176
Montgomery	50.55%	1,012	7.19%	144	42.26%	846	0.00%	0	0.00%	0	8.29%	166
Transylvania	49.45%	631	8.39%	107	42.08%	537	0.08%	1	0.00%	0	7.37%	94
Catawba	50.38%	2,110	4.85%	203	44.70%	1,872	0.00%	0	0.07%	3	5.68%	238
Yadkin	33.90%	713	37.61%	791	28.48%	599	0.00%	0	0.00%	0	-3.71%	-78
Watauga	42.92%	933	19.32%	420	37.67%	819	0.09%	2	0.00%	0	5.24%	114
Stanly	50.73%	1,702	3.13%	105	46.14%	1,548	0.00%	0	0.00%	0	4.59%	154
Cabarrus	46.83%	1,738	10.48%	389	42.68%	1,584	0.00%	0	0.00%	0	4.15%	154
Yancey	50.36%	1,112	2.72%	60	46.92%	1,036	0.00%	0	0.00%	0	3.44%	76
Burke	50.54%	1,365	1.78%	48	47.69%	1,288	0.00%	0	0.00%	0	2.85%	77
Clay	47.94%	372	2.19%	17	49.87%	387	0.00%	0	0.00%	0	-1.93%	-15
Swain	41.54%	766	11.93%	220	46.53%	858	0.00%	0	0.00%	0	-4.99%	-92
Madison	33.89%	897	16.24%	430	49.87%	1,320	0.00%	0	0.00%	0	-15.98%	-423
Wilkes	36.05%	1,636	7.29%	331	56.65%	2,571	0.00%	0	0.00%	0	-20.60%	-935
Mitchell	29.52%	385	15.57%	203	54.91%	716	0.00%	0	0.00%	0	-25.38%	-331
Sampson	32.69%	1,265	2.17%	84	65.12%	2,520	0.00%	0	0.03%	1	-32.43%	-1,255
Avery	16.60%	217	10.56%	138	72.69%	950	0.15%	2	0.00%	0	-56.08%	-733

== See also ==
- United States presidential elections in North Carolina
