= Tyrrell County, North Carolina =

County in North Carolina, United States

- County
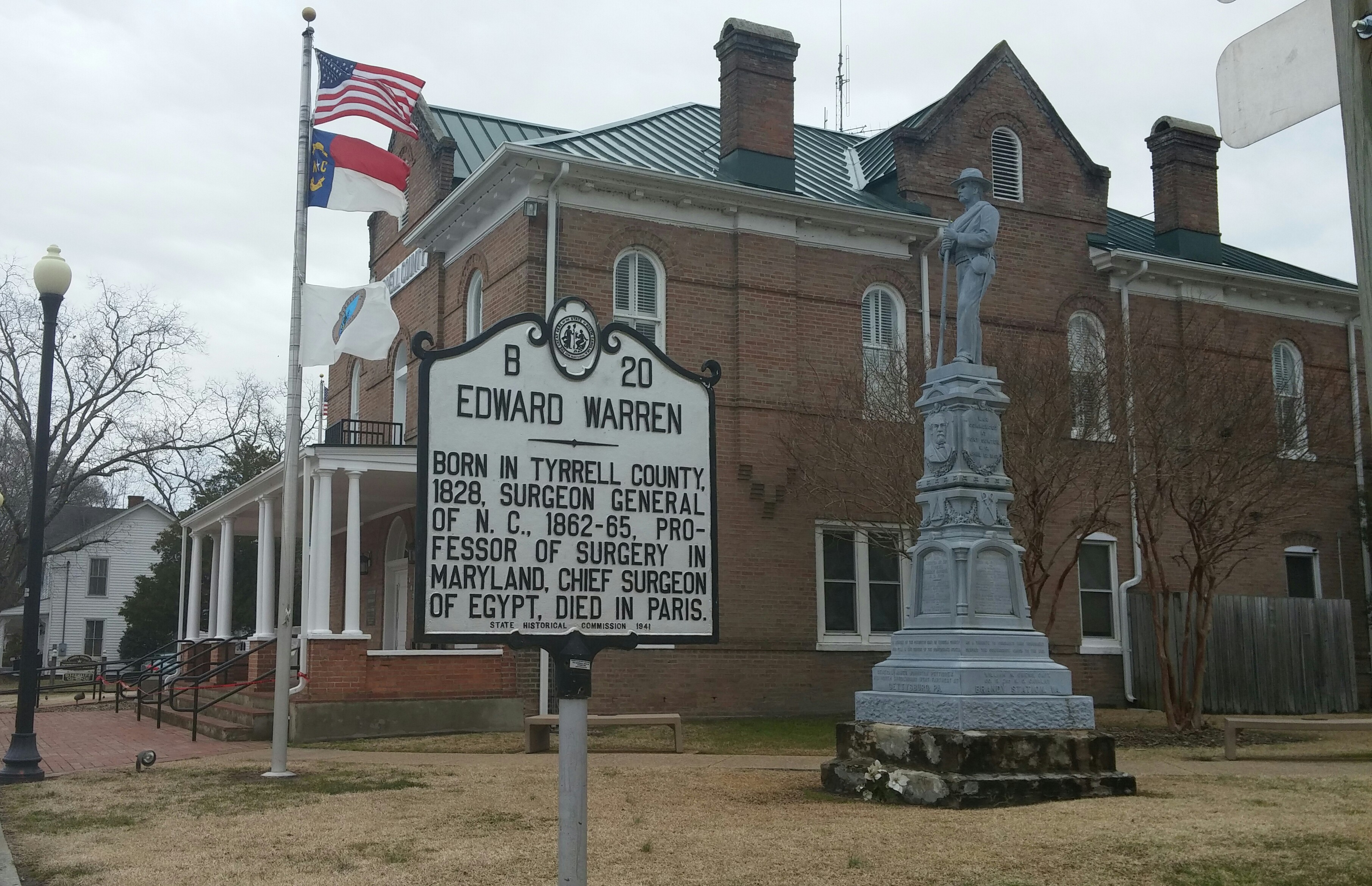
- Tyrrell County Courthouse and Confederate Monument in Columbia

- Flag Seal

- Location within the U.S. state of North Carolina
- Coordinates: 35.87°N 76.17°W
- Country: United States
- State: North Carolina
- Founded: 1729
- Named for: Sir John Tyrrell
- Seat: Columbia
- Largest community: Columbia

Area
  - Total: 597.18 sq mi (1,546.7 km^{2})
  - Land: 390.78 sq mi (1,012.1 km^{2})
  - Water: 206.40 sq mi (534.6 km^{2}) 34.56%

Population (2020)
  - Total: 3,245
  - Estimate (2025): 3,537 ▲
  - Density: 8.3/sq mi (3.2/km^{2})
- Time zone: UTC−5 (Eastern)
  - Summer (DST): UTC−4 (EDT)
- Congressional district: 1st
- Website: tyrrellcounty.org

Tyrrell County (/ˈtɛərɪl/ TAIR-il) is a county located in the U.S. state of North Carolina. As of the 2020 census, the population was 3,245, making it the least populous county in North Carolina. Through most of its history it has been the least populated county in the state. Its county seat is Columbia.

== History ==
The county was formed in 1729 as Tyrrell Precinct of Albemarle County, from parts of Bertie Precinct, Chowan Precinct, Currituck Precinct, and Pasquotank Precinct. It was named for Sir John Tyrrell, one of the Lords Proprietors of Carolina.

With the abolition of Albemarle County in 1739, all of its constituent precincts became counties. In 1774, the western part of Tyrrell County was combined with part of Halifax County to form Martin County. In 1799, the western third of what remained of Tyrrell County became Washington County. In 1870, the half of Tyrrell County east of the Alligator River was combined with parts of Currituck County and Hyde County to form Dare County.

== Geography ==
Interactive map of Tyrrell County

According to the U.S. Census Bureau, the county has a total area of 597.18 square miles (1,546.7 km^{2}), of which 390.78 square miles (1,012.1 km^{2}) is land and 206.40 square miles (534.6 km^{2}) (34.56%) is water. Tyrrell County, due to its proximity to the Outer Banks, has been designated as part of the Inner Banks.

Wildlife in the county includes bears, red wolves, and pitcher plants.

=== National protected area ===
- Pocosin Lakes National Wildlife Refuge (part)

=== State and local protected areas ===
- Alligator River Game Land
- Alligator River Area Outstanding Resource Water (part)
- Buckridge Coastal Reserve Dedicated Nature Preserve
- Buckridge Game Land
- Emily and Richardson Preyer Buckridge Coastal Reserve
- Emily and Richardson Preyer Buckridge Reserve (part)
- J. Morgan Futch Game Land
- Lantern Acres Game Land (part)
- New Lake Game Land
- Palmetto-Peartree Preserve
- Pettigrew State Park (part)
- Texas Plantation Game Land

=== Major water bodies ===
- Albemarle Sound
- Alligator River
- The Frying Pan
- Intracoastal Waterway
- Lake Phelps
- Scuppernong River

=== Adjacent counties ===
- Perquimans County – north
- Pasquotank County – north
- Camden County – north
- Currituck County – northeast
- Dare County – east
- Hyde County – south
- Washington County – west
- Chowan County – northwest

=== Major highways ===
- US 64
- US 64 Bus.
- NC 94

== Demographics ==
Historical population
Census	Pop.	Note	%±
1790	4,826		—
1800	3,395		−29.7%
1810	3,364		−0.9%
1820	4,319		28.4%
1830	4,732		9.6%
1840	4,657		−1.6%
1850	5,133		10.2%
1860	4,944		−3.7%
1870	4,173		−15.6%
1880	4,545		8.9%
1890	4,225		−7.0%
1900	4,980		17.9%
1910	5,219		4.8%
1920	4,849		−7.1%
1930	5,164		6.5%
1940	5,556		7.6%
1950	5,048		−9.1%
1960	4,520		−10.5%
1970	3,806		−15.8%
1980	3,975		4.4%
1990	3,856		−3.0%
2000	4,149		7.6%
2010	4,407		6.2%
2020	3,245		−26.4%
2025 (est.)	3,537	▲	9.0%
U.S. Decennial Census; 1790–1960 1900–1990; 1990–2000 2010 2020

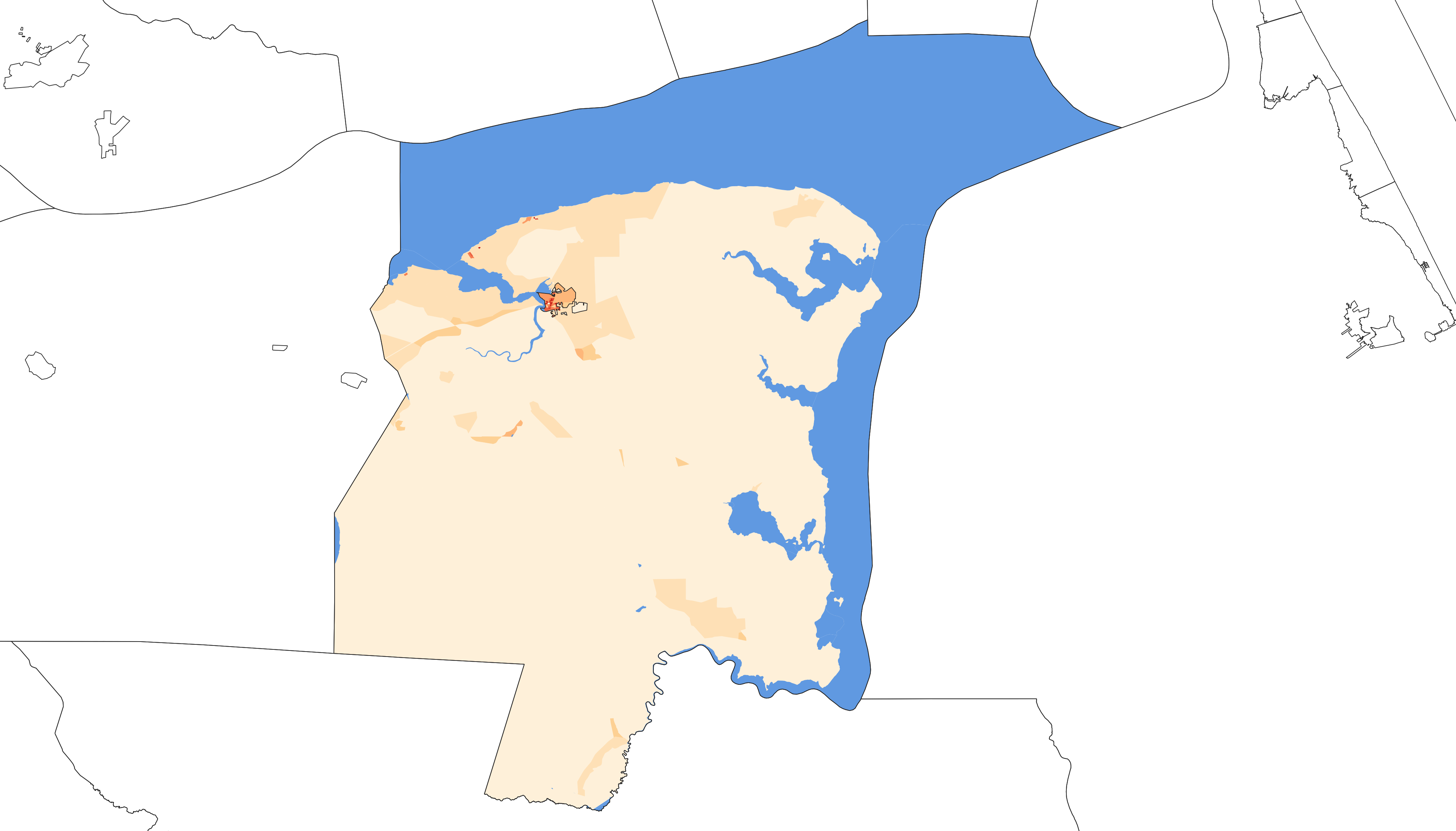
2020 population density of Tyrrell County NC by census block

=== Racial and ethnic composition ===
Tyrell County, North Carolina – Racial and ethnic composition Note: the US Census treats Hispanic/Latino as an ethnic category. This table excludes Latinos from the racial categories and assigns them to a separate category. Hispanics/Latinos may be of any race.
Race / Ethnicity (NH = Non-Hispanic)	Pop 1980	Pop 1990	Pop 2000	Pop 2010	Pop 2020	% 1980	% 1990	% 2000	% 2010	% 2020
White alone (NH)	2,404	2,294	2,303	2,350	1,879	60.48%	59.49%	55.51%	53.32%	57.90%
Black or African American alone (NH)	1,550	1,542	1,633	1,677	934	38.99%	39.99%	39.36%	38.05%	28.78%
Native American or Alaska Native alone (NH)	3	4	8	7	5	0.08%	0.10%	0.19%	0.16%	0.15%
Asian alone (NH)	0	5	31	80	43	0.00%	0.13%	0.75%	1.82%	1.33%
Native Hawaiian or Pacific Islander alone (NH)	x	x	0	1	0	x	x	0.00%	0.02%	0.00%
Other race alone (NH)	4	0	0	1	13	0.10%	0.00%	0.00%	0.02%	0.40%
Mixed race or Multiracial (NH)	x	x	24	51	99	x	x	0.58%	1.16%	3.05%
Hispanic or Latino (any race)	14	11	150	240	272	0.35%	0.29%	3.62%	5.45%	8.38%
Total	3,975	3,856	4,149	4,407	3,245	100.00%	100.00%	100.00%	100.00%	100.00%

=== 2020 census ===
As of the 2020 census, Tyrrell County had 3,245 residents, making it North Carolina's least-populous county.

The median age was 47.2 years, 20.7% of residents were younger than 18, and 22.0% were 65 or older; for every 100 females there were 94.0 males and 90.8 males age 18 and over.

The racial makeup of the county was 58.6% White, 28.9% Black or African American, 0.2% American Indian and Alaska Native, 1.3% Asian, <0.1% Native Hawaiian and Pacific Islander, 4.7% from some other race, and 6.2% from two or more races; Hispanic or Latino residents of any race made up 8.4% of the population.

Less than 0.1% of residents lived in urban areas while 100.0% lived in rural areas.

There were 1,444 households, of which 26.7% had children under 18; 40.5% were married-couple households, 22.2% had a male householder with no spouse or partner present, and 31.0% had a female householder with no spouse or partner present. About 34.2% of all households consisted of individuals, and 16.9% had someone living alone who was 65 or older.

There were 1,999 housing units, with 27.8% vacant. Among occupied units, 71.2% were owner-occupied and 28.8% were renter-occupied; the homeowner vacancy rate stood at 2.9% and the rental vacancy rate at 8.9%.

=== Demographic change ===
Tyrrell County's population peaked in 1940 with 5,556 residents. The population subsequently declined to about 4,000 residents, where it remained for several decades before shrinking further due to outmigration fueled by diminished job opportunities. Between the 2010 and 2020 censuses, Tyrrell's population dropped by 26 percent, the largest population drop by percentage in the state.

== Government and politics ==
Tyrrell County is governed by a five-member Board of County Commissioners. The elections for County Commissioners are partisan and at large. To save money, some of Tyrrell's government services are consolidated with other neighboring rural counties such as Hyde and Washington.

Tyrrell County is a member of the Albemarle Commission, a regional economic development organization which serves several counties in eastern North Carolina.

In 2022, Tyrrell County is represented by Ed Goodwin in the 1st district in the North Carolina House of Representatives and Bobby Hanig in the 1st district in the North Carolina Senate.

United States presidential election results for Tyrrell County, North Carolina
Year	Republican		Democratic		Third party(ies)	
Year	No.	%	No.	%	No.	%
1912	224	35.84%	297	47.52%	104	16.64%
1916	392	48.51%	416	51.49%	0	0.00%
1920	532	42.56%	718	57.44%	0	0.00%
1924	442	40.89%	638	59.02%	1	0.09%
1928	505	51.53%	475	48.47%	0	0.00%
1932	258	22.69%	873	76.78%	6	0.53%
1936	304	22.47%	1,049	77.53%	0	0.00%
1940	415	26.69%	1,140	73.31%	0	0.00%
1944	281	31.50%	611	68.50%	0	0.00%
1948	336	30.19%	732	65.77%	45	4.04%
1952	385	29.59%	916	70.41%	0	0.00%
1956	420	40.58%	615	59.42%	0	0.00%
1960	349	27.37%	926	72.63%	0	0.00%
1964	374	27.30%	996	72.70%	0	0.00%
1968	291	22.61%	581	45.14%	415	32.25%
1972	676	59.30%	459	40.26%	5	0.44%
1976	403	30.88%	900	68.97%	2	0.15%
1980	466	34.01%	887	64.74%	17	1.24%
1984	774	48.89%	807	50.98%	2	0.13%
1988	637	44.70%	785	55.09%	3	0.21%
1992	553	33.03%	928	55.44%	193	11.53%
1996	488	32.25%	908	60.01%	117	7.73%
2000	706	45.08%	849	54.21%	11	0.70%
2004	855	53.77%	731	45.97%	4	0.25%
2008	960	50.26%	933	48.85%	17	0.89%
2012	930	52.16%	837	46.94%	16	0.90%
2016	975	56.07%	720	41.40%	44	2.53%
2020	1,044	57.46%	758	41.72%	15	0.83%
2024	1,057	60.16%	680	38.70%	20	1.14%

In the 2020 elections in Tyrrell County, Republicans took more votes than Democrats in federal and statewide contests.

== Economy ==
Tyrrell County's economy is heavily reliant on agriculture—with its largest crop being potatoes — as well as forestry and fishing. The county also hosts a small tourism industry centered around hunting, fishing, and bird watching. It suffers from high poverty and food insecurity rates.

== Communities ==
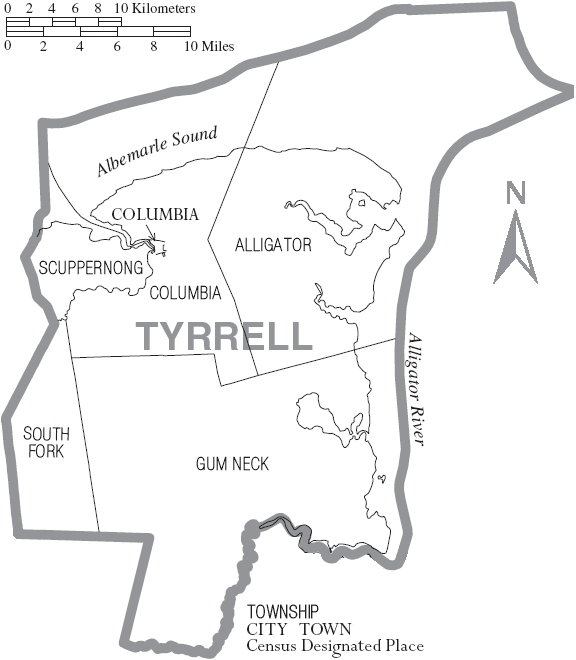
Map of Tyrrell County with municipal and township labels

=== Town ===
- Columbia (county seat and largest community)

=== Townships ===
- Alligator
- Columbia
- Gum Neck
- Scuppernong
- South Fork

=== Unincorporated communities ===
- Fort Landing
- Frying Pan
- Jerry
- Pleasant View
- Kilkenny

== See also ==
- List of counties in North Carolina
- National Register of Historic Places listings in Tyrrell County, North Carolina
- Roanoke Colony, first attempted permanent English settlement in the Americas, now located in Dare County
