= Alligator Lake volcanic complex =

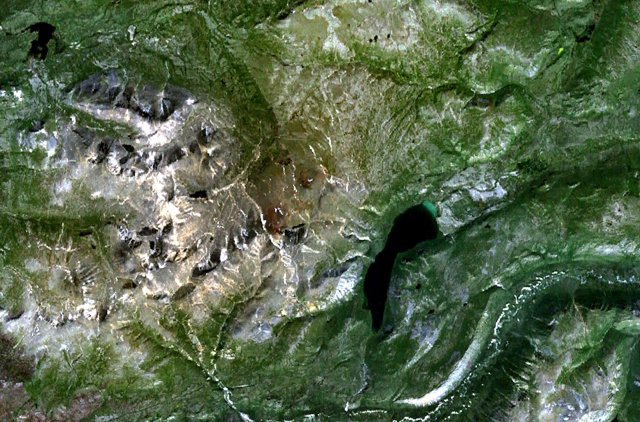
- Aerial photo of the Alligator Lake volcanic complex

Highest point
- Elevation: 2,217 m (7,274 ft)
- Listing: List of volcanoes in Canada List of Northern Cordilleran volcanoes
- Coordinates: 60°25′N 135°25′W

Geography
- Location: Yukon, Canada

Geology
- Rock age: Holocene
- Mountain type: Volcanic field
- Volcanic zone: Northern Cordilleran Volcanic Province
- Last eruption: Unknown

The Alligator Lake volcanic complex is a group of basaltic cinder cones and lava flows in south-central Yukon, Canada. The upper part of the Alligator Lake volcanic complex consists of two well-preserved cinder cones capping a small shield volcano. They probably post-date the local Holocene glaciation. Lava flows from both cinder cones traveled to the north and were erupted simultaneously. Their compositions range from alkali olivine basalt to basanitic. Lava flows from the northeast cone are the largest extending 6 km (4 mi) from the cone and expanding to a width of 10 km (6 mi) at the terminus.

The volcanic complex was named after the nearby Alligator Lake.

== See also ==
- List of Northern Cordilleran volcanoes
- List of volcanoes in Canada
- Volcanic history of the Northern Cordilleran Volcanic Province
- Volcanism of Canada
