= Alligator Lake (Yukon) =

Lake in Yukon, Canada

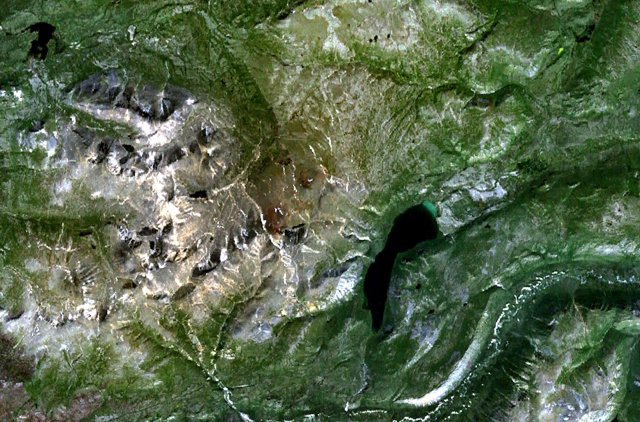
- Alligator Lake by satellite

- Location within Canada
- Location: Yukon
- Coordinates: 60°22′55″N 135°21′10″W
- Basin countries: Canada
- Surface area: 14.3 km^{2} (5.5 sq mi)
- Average depth: 5.4 m (18 ft)
- Residence time: 1.9 years

The Alligator Lake is an alpine lake near Whitehorse in southern Yukon, Canada.Canada. It is 14.3 km^{2} (5.5 sq mi) in area and has an average depth of5.4 m (18 ft). The Alligator Lake volcanic complex, being in the vicinity, is named after it.
