= USS Currituck =

Two ships of the United States Navy have been named Currituck after Currituck Sound along the coasts of North Carolina and Virginia.

- USS Currituck (1843), a Civil War screw steamer originally named Seneca.
- USS Currituck (AV-7), the lead ship of the World War II era Currituck-class seaplane tenders.
