= Pungo River =

River in North Carolina, USA

Coordinates: 35.634509°N 76.5989462°W

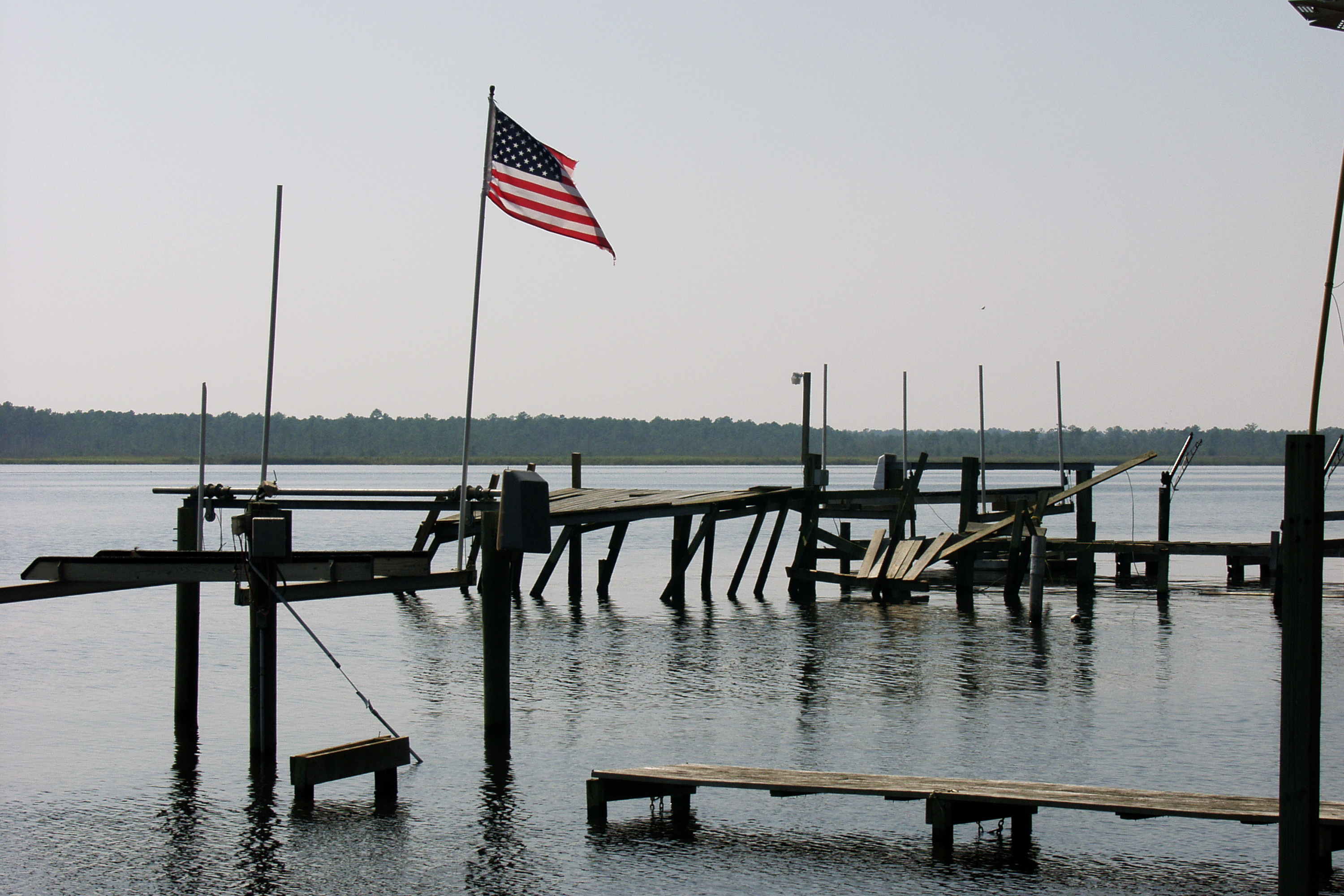
A broken pier on the Pungo River in Belhaven, NC after Hurricane Isabel

The Pungo River is a short blackwater river in eastern North Carolina, United States. It originally began in the Great Dismal Swamp in Washington County, North Carolina; the upper part of the river has since been supplanted by the Pungo River Canal, dug in the 1950s to improve drainage of local farmland. The river flows southeast and forms part of the boundary between Beaufort County and Hyde County. The river then widens dramatically, turns west, and flows past Belhaven, North Carolina before joining the Pamlico River near Pamlico Sound.

A 21-mile (33.8 km) canal connects the Pungo River with the Alligator River to its east.

== See also ==
- Pungo Lake which is connected to the river by canal
- Pungo, Virginia
