= Hyde County, North Carolina =

County in North Carolina, United States

- County
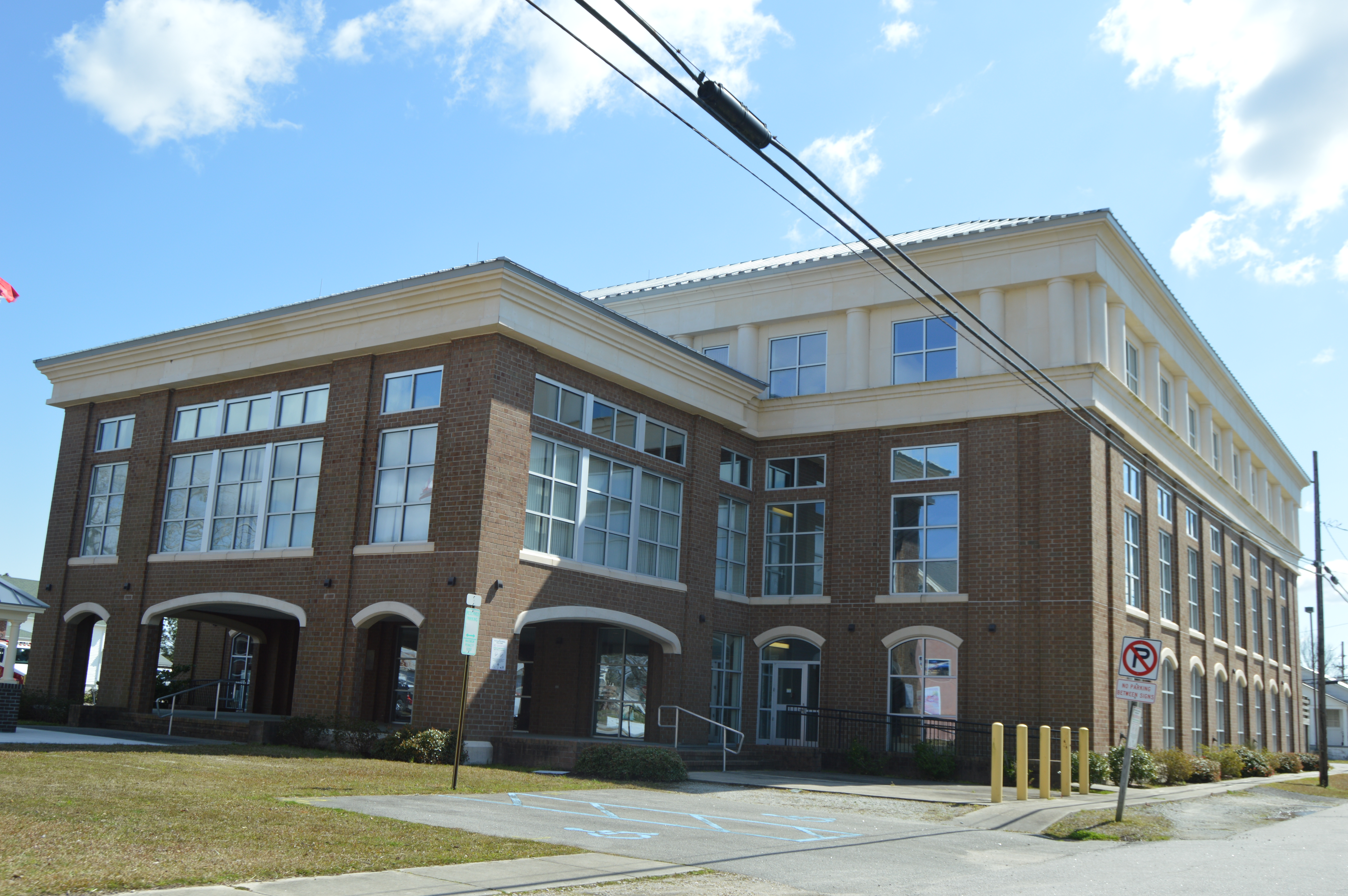
- Hyde County Courthouse in Swan Quarter

- Seal

- Location within the U.S. state of North Carolina
- Interactive map of Hyde County, North Carolina
- Coordinates: 35.41°N 76.15°W
- Country: United States
- State: North Carolina
- Founded: 1712
- Named for: Edward Hyde
- Seat: Swan Quarter
- Largest community: Ocracoke

Area
  - Total: 1,459.05 sq mi (3,778.9 km^{2})
  - Land: 612.35 sq mi (1,586.0 km^{2})
  - Water: 846.70 sq mi (2,192.9 km^{2}) 58.03%

Population (2020)
  - Total: 4,589
  - Estimate (2025): 4,554 ▼
  - Density: 7.49/sq mi (2.89/km^{2})
- Time zone: UTC−5 (Eastern)
  - Summer (DST): UTC−4 (EDT)
- Congressional district: 3rd
- Website: www.hydecountync.gov

Hyde County is a county located in the U.S. state of North Carolina. As of the 2020 census, the population was 4,589, making it the second-least populous county in North Carolina. Its county seat is Swan Quarter. The county was created in 1705 as Wickham Precinct. It was renamed Hyde Precinct in 1712 and gained county status in 1739.

== History ==
=== Early history and creation ===
Sources conflict over when the area that eventually grew to encompass Hyde County was settled by Europeans. The earliest known colonial land deeds in the present day county date from 1704 or 1705. European settlement remained sparse over the subsequent decades, though the English established a small fort on the northern shore of Lake Mattamuskeet. In 1711, Algonquin-speaking Native Americans in the area joined with the proximate Tuscarora people in launching a war against the settlers. The conflict was won by the settlers in 1715, with many captured Native Americans enslaved and the remaining Tuscaroras largely expelled from North Carolina. The local Algonquin natives were gathered on the newly created Mattamuskeet Reservation, which comprised most of the eastern mainland section of what eventually became Hyde County. Due to pressure from the settlers, the Native Americans began selling their land in 1731. By 1792, all of the reservation had been sold, and its inhabitants either left the region or intermarried with local European Americans and African Americans.

The county was formed December 3, 1705, as Wickham Precinct, one of three precincts within Bath County. The name Wickham was derived from the manor of Temple Wycombe in Buckinghamshire, England, the family home of John Archdale, governor of North and South Carolina from 1695 to 1696. In 1712, it was renamed Hyde Precinct for Edward Hyde, Governor of North Carolina from 1711 to 1712. In 1739, Bath County was abolished, and Hyde Precinct became Hyde County. In 1745, Lake Mattamuskeet and its adjoining territory were transferred from Currituck County to Hyde County.

=== Antebellum ===
Communities coalesced and churches were formed in the aftermath of the Revolutionary War.

In 1819, the portion of Hyde County west of the Pungo River was annexed by Beaufort County. Four years later, the area of Currituck County south of New Inlet was transferred to Hyde County. This area included Hatteras Island.

In 1834, an "apprenticeship" program was begun whereby local Native American children were placed under the tutelage of white families to learn trades. Lasting until 1865, the policy resulted in the loss of much independent Native American cultural identity in the area. In 1845, Ocracoke Island was transferred from Carteret County to Hyde County. Ocracoke benefitted from a modest shipping industry which persisted into the mid-1800s, while the mainland portion of county was largely agrarian, though farmers struggled in the swampy terrain. Locals also fished and harvested oysters. In 1860, 37.4% of Hyde's population were slaves—a proportion lower than many other counties in eastern North Carolina.

=== Later history ===
Local residents were divided by the outbreak of the American Civil War, though a number enlisted into the Confederate States Army. Several skirmishes took place in the county between federal and Confederate forces during 1863 and 1864, and a substantial number of slaves fled to federally held territory to seek their emancipation.

During the Reconstruction era after the war, some residents, white and newly freed blacks, migrated out of Hyde. In 1870, Hyde County was reduced to its present dimensions, when its northeastern part was combined with parts of Currituck County and Tyrrell County to form Dare County. Northern investors also took an interest in the county during Reconstruction, particularly in the harvest of timber. Between 1870 and 1920, the county experienced some economic prosperity due to the logging of cypress, juniper, and oak trees. Several sawmills and railroads were established. The industry declined as the county's forests thinned, before being overcome by the Great Depression. Hyde County received its first paved road in the 1920s and gained electric service in 1935.

By the mid-20th century, the agriculturally-reliant county was in economic and demographic decline, benefiting none from the public infrastructure investments and industrial growth of the postwar economic boom occurring elsewhere in the state. Several towns that had prospered in the early 1900s were left totally abandoned, and the vast majority of county residents were impoverished. The timber industry continued to provide some employment, while after World War II the seafood packing industry grew. Jim Crow racial segregation took hold after the close of the 19th century and persisted, depriving blacks of political and economic opportunities available to whites. In 1950, about one third of white residents had access to hot running water and flushing toilets, while no blacks had such amenities, and tended to live near small creeks and drainage canals. Racial separation was less pronounced on Ocracoke Island, where blacks and whites lived in closer physical proximity to one another.

== Geography and physical features ==
According to the U.S. Census Bureau, the county has a total area of 1,459.05 square miles (3,778.9 km^{2}), of which 612.35 square miles (1,586.0 km^{2}) is land and 846.70 square miles (2,192.9 km^{2}) (58.03%) is water. It is the second-largest county in North Carolina by total area. Hyde County's comprises an inland portion and Ocracoke Island, a part of the Outer Banks. It is bordered by Dare and Tyrrell counties to the north, by Washington County to the northwest, by Beaufort County to the west, and by Pamlico and Carteret counties to the southwest. The mainland portion of the county also borders the Pamlico Sound, while Ocracoke Island rests on the Atlantic Ocean.

Hyde County is characterized by many swamps. It has a flat topography and its highest point, a spot west of Alligator Lake, rests about 18 feet above sea level. Owing to its low elevation, the county suffers from frequent flooding and saltwater intrusion of its soil. Lake Mattamuskeet is the largest naturally occurring lake in North Carolina.

Hyde County is within the path of the Atlantic Flyway, and thus features seasonal populations of various migratory waterfowl species, including tundra swan and Canada geese.

=== National protected areas ===
- Alligator River National Wildlife Refuge (part)
- Cape Hatteras National Seashore (part)
- Mattamuskeet National Wildlife Refuge
- Pocosin Lakes National Wildlife Refuge (part)
- Swanquarter National Wildlife Refuge
- Swanquarter Wilderness

=== State and local protected areas ===
- Dare Game Land (part)
- Emily and Richardson Preyer Buckridge Reserve (part)
- Gull Rock Game Land
- Hatteras Inlet Crab Spawning Sanctuary (part)
- New Lake Game Land
- Pungo River Game Land

=== Major water bodies ===
- Albemarle Sound
- Alligator Lake
- Alligator River
- Atlantic Ocean (North Atlantic Ocean)
- Hatteras Inlet
- Intracoastal Waterway
- Lake Mattamuskeet
- Ocracoke Inlet
- Pamlico River
- Pamlico Sound
- Pungo Lake
- Pungo River
- Raleigh Bay

=== Major highways ===
- US 264
- NC 12
- NC 45
- NC 94
- NC 99

=== Major infrastructure ===
- Cedar Island–Ocracoke Ferry (to Carteret County)
- Hatteras–Ocracoke Ferry (to Dare County)
- Swan Quarter–Ocracoke Ferry

== Demographics ==
Historical population
Census	Pop.	Note	%±
1790	4,204		—
1800	4,829		14.9%
1810	6,029		24.8%
1820	4,967		−17.6%
1830	6,184		24.5%
1840	6,458		4.4%
1850	7,636		18.2%
1860	7,732		1.3%
1870	6,445		−16.6%
1880	7,765		20.5%
1890	8,903		14.7%
1900	9,278		4.2%
1910	8,840		−4.7%
1920	8,386		−5.1%
1930	8,550		2.0%
1940	7,860		−8.1%
1950	6,479		−17.6%
1960	5,765		−11.0%
1970	5,571		−3.4%
1980	5,873		5.4%
1990	5,411		−7.9%
2000	5,826		7.7%
2010	5,810		−0.3%
2020	4,589		−21.0%
2025 (est.)	4,554	▼	−0.8%
U.S. Decennial Census; 1790–1960 1900–1990; 1990–2000 2010 2020

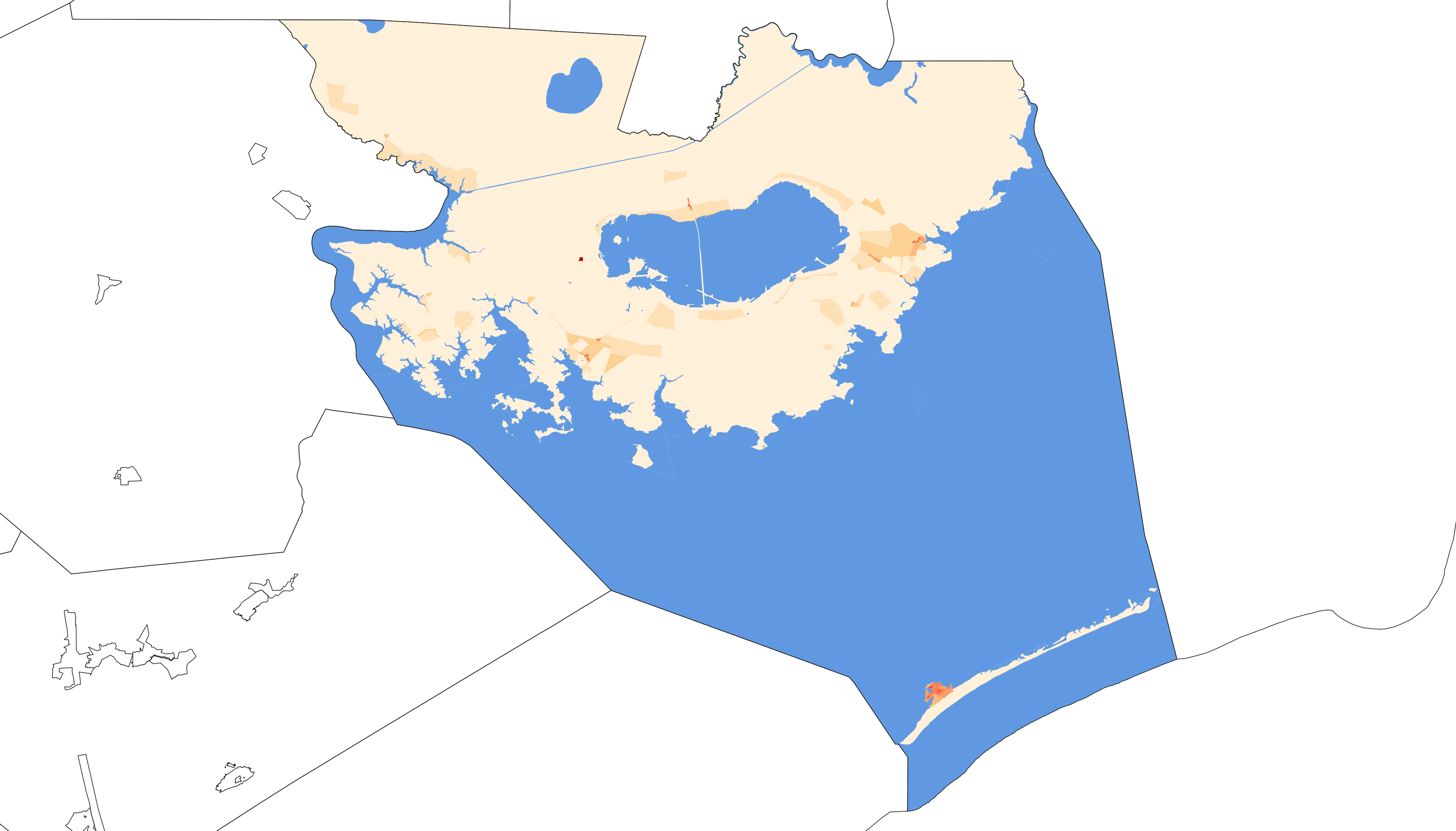
2020 population density of Hyde County NC by census block

=== Racial and ethnic composition ===
Hyde County, North Carolina – Racial and ethnic composition Note: the US Census treats Hispanic/Latino as an ethnic category. This table excludes Latinos from the racial categories and assigns them to a separate category. Hispanics/Latinos may be of any race.
Race / Ethnicity (NH = Non-Hispanic)	Pop 1980	Pop 1990	Pop 2000	Pop 2010	Pop 2020	% 1980	% 1990	% 2000	% 2010	% 2020
White alone (NH)	3,754	3,582	3,590	3,436	2,928	63.92%	66.20%	61.62%	59.14%	63.80%
Black or African American alone (NH)	2,057	1,778	2,038	1,833	1,152	35.02%	32.86%	34.98%	31.55%	25.10%
Native American or Alaska Native alone (NH)	0	4	18	22	7	0.00%	0.07%	0.31%	0.38%	0.15%
Asian alone (NH)	2	3	16	16	7	0.03%	0.06%	0.27%	0.28%	0.15%
Native Hawaiian or Pacific Islander alone (NH)	x	x	0	1	2	x	x	0.00%	0.02%	0.04%
Other race alone (NH)	6	1	0	26	15	0.10%	0.02%	0.00%	0.45%	0.33%
Mixed race or Multiracial (NH)	x	x	33	65	131	x	x	0.57%	1.12%	2.85%
Hispanic or Latino (any race)	54	43	131	411	347	0.92%	0.79%	2.25%	7.07%	7.56%
Total	5,873	5,411	5,826	5,810	4,589	100.00%	100.00%	100.00%	100.00%	100.00%

=== 2020 census ===
As of the 2020 census, there were 4,589 people in Hyde County, making it the second-least populous county in North Carolina.

The median age was 48.7 years. 17.5% of residents were under the age of 18 and 23.1% of residents were 65 years of age or older. For every 100 females there were 121.3 males, and for every 100 females age 18 and over there were 123.3 males age 18 and over.

The racial makeup of the county was 64.4% White, 25.5% Black or African American, 0.2% American Indian and Alaska Native, 0.2% Asian, <0.1% Native Hawaiian and Pacific Islander, 4.7% from some other race, and 5.0% from two or more races. Hispanic or Latino residents of any race comprised 7.6% of the population.

<0.1% of residents lived in urban areas, while 100.0% lived in rural areas.

There were 1,804 households in the county, of which 25.3% had children under the age of 18 living in them. Of all households, 43.6% were married-couple households, 21.6% were households with a male householder and no spouse or partner present, and 30.3% were households with a female householder and no spouse or partner present. About 34.6% of all households were made up of individuals and 18.2% had someone living alone who was 65 years of age or older.

There were 3,146 housing units, of which 42.7% were vacant. Among occupied housing units, 75.5% were owner-occupied and 24.5% were renter-occupied. The homeowner vacancy rate was 2.0% and the rental vacancy rate was 15.1%.

=== Demographic change ===
Hyde County's population peaked with 9,278 people in 1900. Between 1900 and 2000, the county's population declined by almost 50 percent. Between the 2010 and 2020 censuses, Hyde's population dropped by 21 percent, one of the largest population drops by percentage in the state.

== Law and government ==
There are no incorporated communities or municipal governments in Hyde; all local governmental activities occur at the county level. Hyde County is governed by a five-member board of commissioners. Each member is nominated by a township in the county, but all are elected at-large. The commissioners appoint a county manager who oversees county governmental administration. As of 2024, Hyde County has the highest per-capita tax levy in the state – $2,249 per person.

Hyde County is a member of the Albemarle Commission, a regional economic development organization which serves several counties in eastern North Carolina.

Hyde County is located within North Carolina's 3rd congressional district, the North Carolina Senate's 1st district, and the North Carolina House of Representatives' 79th district.

=== Politics ===
United States presidential election results for Hyde County, North Carolina
Year	Republican		Democratic		Third party(ies)	
Year	No.	%	No.	%	No.	%
1912	76	7.51%	636	62.85%	300	29.64%
1916	277	24.64%	840	74.73%	7	0.62%
1920	530	31.85%	1,134	68.15%	0	0.00%
1924	305	31.31%	653	67.04%	16	1.64%
1928	682	53.62%	590	46.38%	0	0.00%
1932	147	12.24%	1,050	87.43%	4	0.33%
1936	302	20.70%	1,157	79.30%	0	0.00%
1940	309	20.45%	1,202	79.55%	0	0.00%
1944	323	25.90%	924	74.10%	0	0.00%
1948	214	20.34%	800	76.05%	38	3.61%
1952	406	30.64%	919	69.36%	0	0.00%
1956	491	32.32%	1,028	67.68%	0	0.00%
1960	481	29.55%	1,147	70.45%	0	0.00%
1964	514	31.32%	1,127	68.68%	0	0.00%
1968	401	20.02%	769	38.39%	833	41.59%
1972	1,112	71.97%	403	26.08%	30	1.94%
1976	623	36.28%	1,084	63.13%	10	0.58%
1980	807	38.95%	1,221	58.93%	44	2.12%
1984	1,195	54.27%	1,004	45.59%	3	0.14%
1988	940	41.52%	1,316	58.13%	8	0.35%
1992	740	32.34%	1,206	52.71%	342	14.95%
1996	782	38.30%	1,109	54.31%	151	7.39%
2000	1,132	50.60%	1,088	48.64%	17	0.76%
2004	1,235	53.86%	1,048	45.70%	10	0.44%
2008	1,212	49.09%	1,241	50.26%	16	0.65%
2012	1,193	50.06%	1,163	48.80%	27	1.13%
2016	1,288	55.90%	965	41.88%	51	2.21%
2020	1,418	56.90%	1,046	41.97%	28	1.12%
2024	1,465	60.51%	931	38.46%	25	1.03%

The mainland area of Hyde County tends to be dominated by Republicans, while Ocracoke tends to be dominated by Democrats. In the 2020 U.S. presidential election, Republican Donald Trump defeated Democrat Joe Biden by nearly 400 votes in Hyde, with only Ocracoke's voting precinct offering a majority for Biden. The county also favored Republican candidates in statewide and most local races.

== Economy ==
Hyde County is one of the most economically distressed counties in North Carolina. The economy is sustained by agriculture, fishing, and tourism. Most of the county's businesses are concentrated on Ocracoke Island and cater to tourists.

== Education ==
Hyde County is home to the smallest public school system in North Carolina. The Hyde County Schools comprises two schools.

- Mattamuskeet School, K-12 serves the mainland
- Ocracoke School, K-12 serves Ocracoke Island

The only private school in Hyde County is a small Mennonite school located in the northwest section of the county. This school serves the county's Mennonite population.

According to the 2022 American Community Survey, an estimated 16.4 percent of county residents have attained a bachelor's degree or higher level of education.

== Healthcare ==
Hyde County's last hospital closed in 2014. It is one of three counties in North Carolina with no private dental practitioners.

== Culture ==
Hyde County is a popular destination for fishing and bear and duck hunting. Ocracoke attracts many tourists. Most families that reside in Hyde County have generational roots there, and many black and white families share surnames. Historically, natives of both mainland Hyde County and Ocracoke Island often spoke a Hoi Toider dialect of English. The trend has declined over time, and, particularly since the 1970s, newer generations of local African Americans tend to speak a dialect closer to urban variants of African-American Vernacular English.

== Media ==
Hyde County is home to two full power radio stations, WKHC 97.1 FM and WCMS-FM 94.5. These stations are licensed to Hatteras, NC but maintain transmitter facilities outside of Engelhard.

Ocracoke Island is home to WOVV 90.1 FM, a low power non-commercial station.

== Communities ==
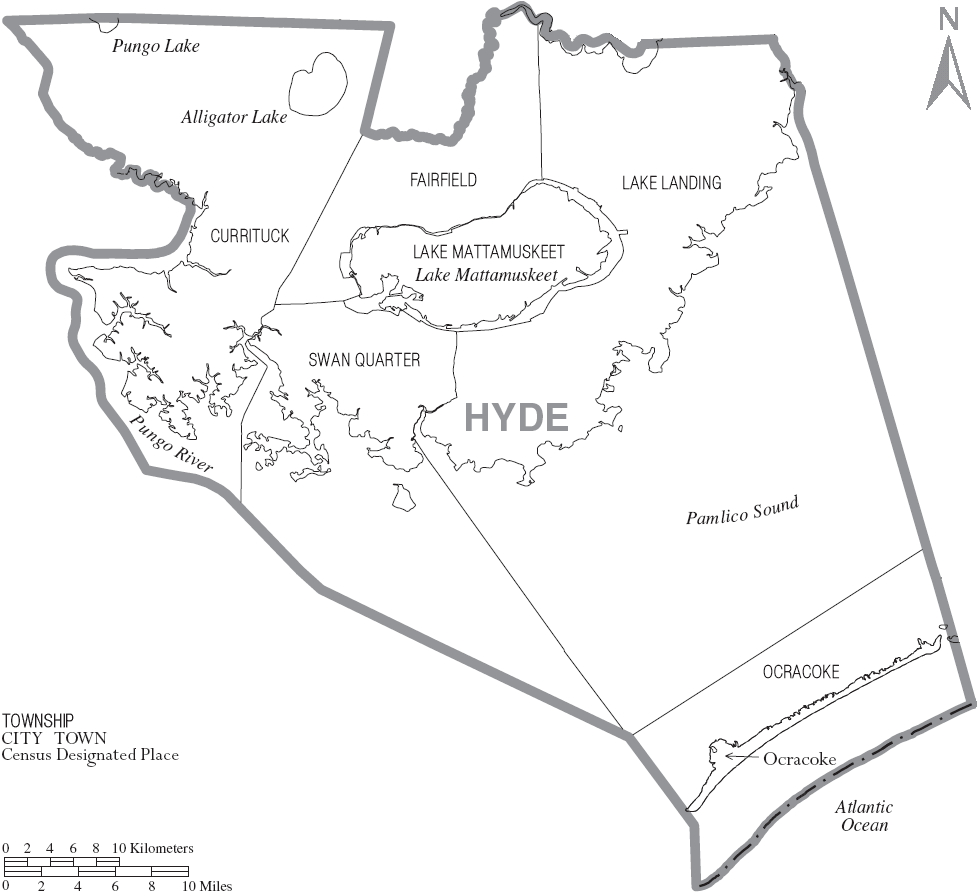
Map of Hyde County with municipal and township labels

Hyde County has no incorporated municipalities. There are five townships: Currituck, Fairfield, Lake Landing, Ocracoke, and Swan Quarter.

=== Census-designated places ===
- Engelhard
- Fairfield
- Ocracoke (largest community)
- Swan Quarter (county seat)

=== Unincorporated communities ===
- Germantown
- Last Chance
- Nebraska
- Scranton
- Ponzer
- Sladesville

=== Townships ===
- Currituck
- Fairfield
- Lake Landing
- Ocracoke
- Swan Quarter

A sixth township, Mattamuskeet, is now "unorganized territory" occupied by the federally controlled Mattamuskeet National Wildlife Refuge.

== See also ==
- List of counties in North Carolina
- National Register of Historic Places listings in Hyde County, North Carolina
- Blackbeard was killed after a battle on his ship, Queen Anne's Revenge, near Ocracoke

== Works cited ==
- Cecelski, David S. (1994). Along Freedom Road: Hyde County, North Carolina, and the Fate of Black Schools in the South. Chapel Hill, London: University of North Carolina Press. ISBN 9780807844373.
- Holland Consulting Planners (2008), Hyde County CAMA Core Land Use Plan (PDF), Hyde County Board of Commissioners
- Wolfram, Walt; Thomas, Erik (2008). The Development of African American English. John Wiley & Sons. ISBN 9780470779903.
- Wolfram, Walt; Reaser, Jeffrey (2014). Talkin' Tar Heel : How Our Voices Tell the Story of North Carolina. Chapel Hill: The University of North Carolina Press. ISBN 978-1-4696-1437-3.
