= Hyde County Schools =

School district in North Carolina

Hyde County Schools is a public school district in Hyde County, North Carolina. Headquartered in Swan Quarter, currently operates two K-12 schools.

== History ==
David S. Cecelski, author of Along Freedom Road: Hyde County, North Carolina, and the Fate of Black Schools in the South, stated that in the era of de jure school segregation, schools for white children had full services, facilities, and transportation via school bus, and that schools for black children, all inferior to those for white children, "varied considerably" with "decades of official neglect and underfunding" being more common. Cecelski stated that the black schools had improved by the 1960s and that the two consolidated elementary schools were "solid, well-lit brick buildings comparable to" the previous White schools. He stated that the "disparity" between the facilities "had been reduced considerably."

== Schools ==
- Mattamuskeet School, mainland
  - Formed in the middle 20th century as a consolidation of East Hyde School and West Hyde School. It formed as white residents, seeing improved educational facilities for black students, in turn wanted improved facilities for their own children. It was initially only for white children, and after 1963 all white children were designated for the school. According to Cecelski, white county residents became politically divided over the formation of the new school, resulting in "a bitter conflict".
- Ocracoke School, Ocracoke Island

Former schools:

- East Hyde School (for white students) (Engelhard)
- West Hyde School (for white students) (Swan Quarter)
- Hyde County Training School (for black students) (Sladesville)
  - In the segregation era the school could not educate all black students in the county who wanted a high school education. It had a boarding facility that cost money to use.
- Davis School (Engelhard) - It was initially a smaller school for black children, but in 1954 it gained an 8-classroom addition as well as a home economics facility and library. That year high school grades were added. A gymnasium and six classrooms were built after 1964.
- O. A. Peay School (Job's Corner, near Swan Squarter)- Opened 1953 as a consolidation of smaller black elementary schools. In 1958 it had a room for science classes and three more classrooms. In 1964 the school received a worship and a facility for agricultural classes.

Peay's and Hyde County Training School's students held school reunions though they diminished by 2017.
