= Alligator River (North Carolina) =

Stream in North Carolina, USA

Alligator River Tributary to Albemarle Sound
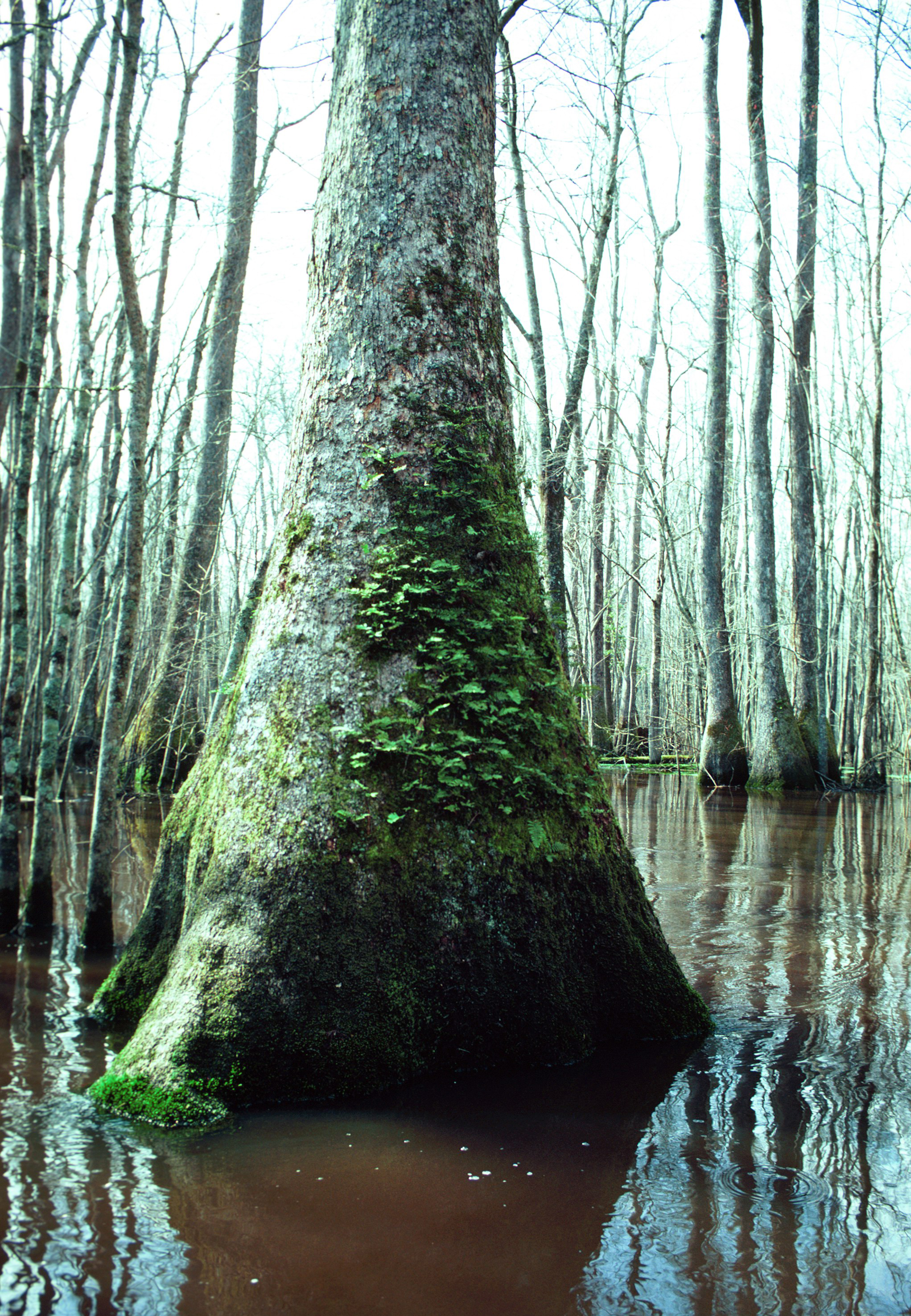

- Location of Alligator River mouth Alligator River (North Carolina) (the United States)

Location
- Country: United States
- State: North Carolina
- Counties: Dare; Hyde; Tyrrell

Physical characteristics
- Source: divide between Pungo River, Lake Mattamuskeet and Alligator River
  - location: about 3 miles NW of Fairfield, North Carolina
  - coordinates: 35°33′59″N 075°58′54″W
  - elevation: 2 ft (0.61 m)
- Mouth: Albemarle Sound
  - location: East Lake, North Carolina
  - coordinates: 35°58′02″N 075°58′54″W
  - elevation: 0 ft (0 m)
- Length: 47.37 mi (76.23 km)
- Basin size: 571.24 square miles (1,479.5 km^{2})
- Discharge
  - location: Albemarle Sound
  - average: 619.03 cu ft/s (17.529 m^{3}/s) at mouth with Albemarle Sound

Basin features
- Progression: North
- River system: Albemarle Sound
- Tributaries
  - left: New Lake Fork; Northwest Fork; Gum Neck Creek; Goose Creek; Second Creek; Little Alligator River
  - right: Swan Creek; Whipping Creek; Milltail Creek

Alligator River is a small river in eastern North Carolina, separating Dare County and Tyrrell County. It empties into Albemarle Sound. A 21-mile canal connects the Alligator River with Pungo River to its west. The Lindsay C. Warren Bridge of U.S. Route 64 crosses the river.

The Alligator River is protected as part of Alligator River National Wildlife Refuge. Habitat bordering the Refuge includes many diverse types including high and low pocosin, bogs, fresh and brackish water marshes, hardwood swamps, and Atlantic white cypress swamps. Plant species include pitcher plants and sun dews, low bush cranberries, redbay, Atlantic white cypress, pond pine, American sweetgum, red maple, and a wide variety of herbaceous and shrub species common to the East Coast.

The refuge is one of the premier strongholds for American black bear on the Eastern Seaboard. It also has concentrations of ducks, geese, and swans. The wildlife diversity includes wading birds, shorebirds, American woodcock, raptors, black bears, alligators, white-tailed deer, raccoons, cottontail rabbits, bobwhite quail, northern river otters, red wolves, red-cockaded woodpeckers, and neotropical migrants.
