= National Register of Historic Places listings in Hyde County, North Carolina =

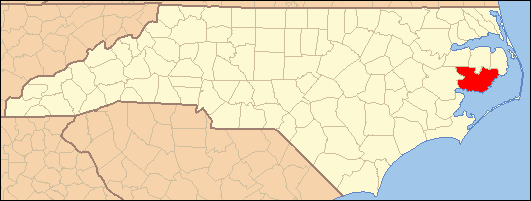

This list includes properties and districts listed on the National Register of Historic Places in Hyde County, North Carolina. Click the "Map of all coordinates" link to the right to view an online map of all properties and districts with latitude and longitude coordinates in the table below.

== Current listings ==
This National Park Service list is complete through NPS recent listings posted March 14, 2025.

	Name on the Register	Image	Date listed	Location	City or town	Description
1	George V. Credle House and Cemetery	George V. Credle House and Cemetery	July 29, 1985 (#85001670)	U.S. Route 264; 35°27′16″N 76°22′05″W	Rose Bay	
2	Davis School	Davis School	July 5, 1985 (#100008848)	33460, 33478 US 264; 35°30′40″N 76°01′23″W	Engelhard	
3	Fairfield Historic District		July 5, 1985 (#85001448)	SR 1308, 1309, 1305 and North Carolina Highway 94; 35°32′29″N 76°13′39″W	Fairfield	
4	Hyde County Courthouse	Hyde County Courthouse	May 10, 1979 (#79001726)	20 Oyster Creek Rd. 35°24′22″N 76°19′44″W	Swan Quarter	
5	Inkwell	Inkwell	September 1, 1978 (#78001960)	East of Lake Landing on U.S. Route 264 in Lake Landing Township; 35°29′05″N 76°03′11″W	Engelhard	
6	Lake Landing Historic District	Lake Landing Historic District	March 10, 1986 (#86000786)	Roughly bounded by the Mattamuskeet Refuge, Middletown, Nebraska, SR 1110, and U.S. Route 264; 35°27′41″N 76°03′56″W	Lake Landing	
7	Lake Mattamuskeet Pump Station	Lake Mattamuskeet Pump Station	May 28, 1980 (#80002849)	East of Swan Quarter; 35°27′06″N 76°10′30″W	Swan Quarter	
8	Ocracoke Historic District	Ocracoke Historic District	September 28, 1990 (#90001465)	Southwestern tip of Ocracoke Island, around Silver Lake; 35°06′53″N 75°59′02″W	Ocracoke	
9	Ocracoke Light Station	Ocracoke Light Station	November 25, 1977 (#77000110)	SR 1326; 35°06′31″N 75°59′11″W	Ocracoke	
10	Albin B. Swindell House and Store		August 14, 1986 (#86001641)	U.S. Route 264; 35°26′10″N 76°16′56″W	Swindell Fork	
11	Wynne's Folly	Wynne's Folly	December 6, 1977 (#77001002)	West of Engelhard on U.S. Route 264; 35°30′01″N 76°01′41″W	Engelhard	

== See also ==
- National Register of Historic Places listings in North Carolina
- List of National Historic Landmarks in North Carolina
