= Hyde County Courthouse =

Hyde County Courthouse may refer to:

- Hyde County Courthouse (North Carolina), listed on the National Register of Historic Places (NRHP) in North Carolina
- Hyde County Courthouse (South Dakota), NRHP-listed
