= Almyra Maynard Watson =

American military nurse (1917–2018)

Personal details
- Born: September 17, 1917 Lake Landing, Hyde County, North Carolina, U.S.
- Died: December 9, 2018 (aged 101) Tarboro, North Carolina, U.S.
- Resting place: Whitehurst-Lloyd Family Cemetery; Bethel, North Carolina, U.S.

Military service
- Allegiance: United States
- Branch/service: United States Army Nurse Corps
- Years of service: 1941–1963
- Rank: Major
- Battles/wars: World War II; Korean War

Almyra Maynard Watson (September 17, 1917 – December 9, 2018) was an American military nurse. She served in the American Red Cross Disaster Nurse's Service before joining the United States Army Nurse Corps in 1941. Watson served during World War II and the Korean War, and was stationed in the United States, Germany, Japan, and the Philippines.

== Early life ==
Watson was born on September 17, 1917, in Lake Landing to George M. Watson and Jennie Lloyd Watson. As a young girl, she and her family moved to Bethel, a town in Pitt County, North Carolina. Watson's father was the first person in the county to own an automobile and operated the county's first service station.

== Career ==
Watson trained as a nurse at St. Vincent DePaul Hospital in Norfolk, Virginia. After completing her training, she worked at Emergency Hospital in Annapolis, Maryland and joined the American Red Cross Disaster Nurse's Service. She also served as a nurse in the United States National Guard and was due to leave the service when the United States entered World War II. She served as an army nurse for twenty-three years, with stations in Germany, Japan, the United States, and the Philippines and was one of the first nurses to work in military field conditions in the corps. She was selected for a special field hospital program and became a consultant for nursing in field operations. She was eventually promoted to the rank of major. During the Korean War, she was stationed at the United Nations Hospital in the Philippines. She was also stationed, throughout her career, at Fort Monroe in Virginia, Walter Reed Hospital in Washington, D.C., Fort Knox in Kentucky.

Following her retirement from the Army in 1963, Watson worked as a nurse at Bethel Clinic and joined the Retired Army Nurse Corps Association.

== Personal life ==
Watson was a member of the Major Benjamin May Chapter of the Daughters of the American Revolution, the Queen Anne Chapter of the National Society Daughters of the American Colonists, the Eleanor White Dare Chapter of the National Society Colonial Dames XVII Century, and the George B. Singletary Chapter of the United Daughters of the Confederacy. She was also a member of the National Society United States Daughters of 1812, the Order of First Families of North Carolina, the Sons and Daughters of the Pilgrims, and the Pitt County Historical Society.

Watson died on December 9, 2018, in Tarboro, North Carolina. A funeral service was held on December 13, 2018, at Bethel United Methodist Church. She was buried, with full military honors, in the Whitehurst-Lloyd Family Cemetery in Bethel.
