= Inkwell (Lake Landing, North Carolina) =

Historic house in North Carolina, United States

- Inkwell/Octagon House
- U.S. National Register of Historic Places
- U.S. Historic district – Contributing property
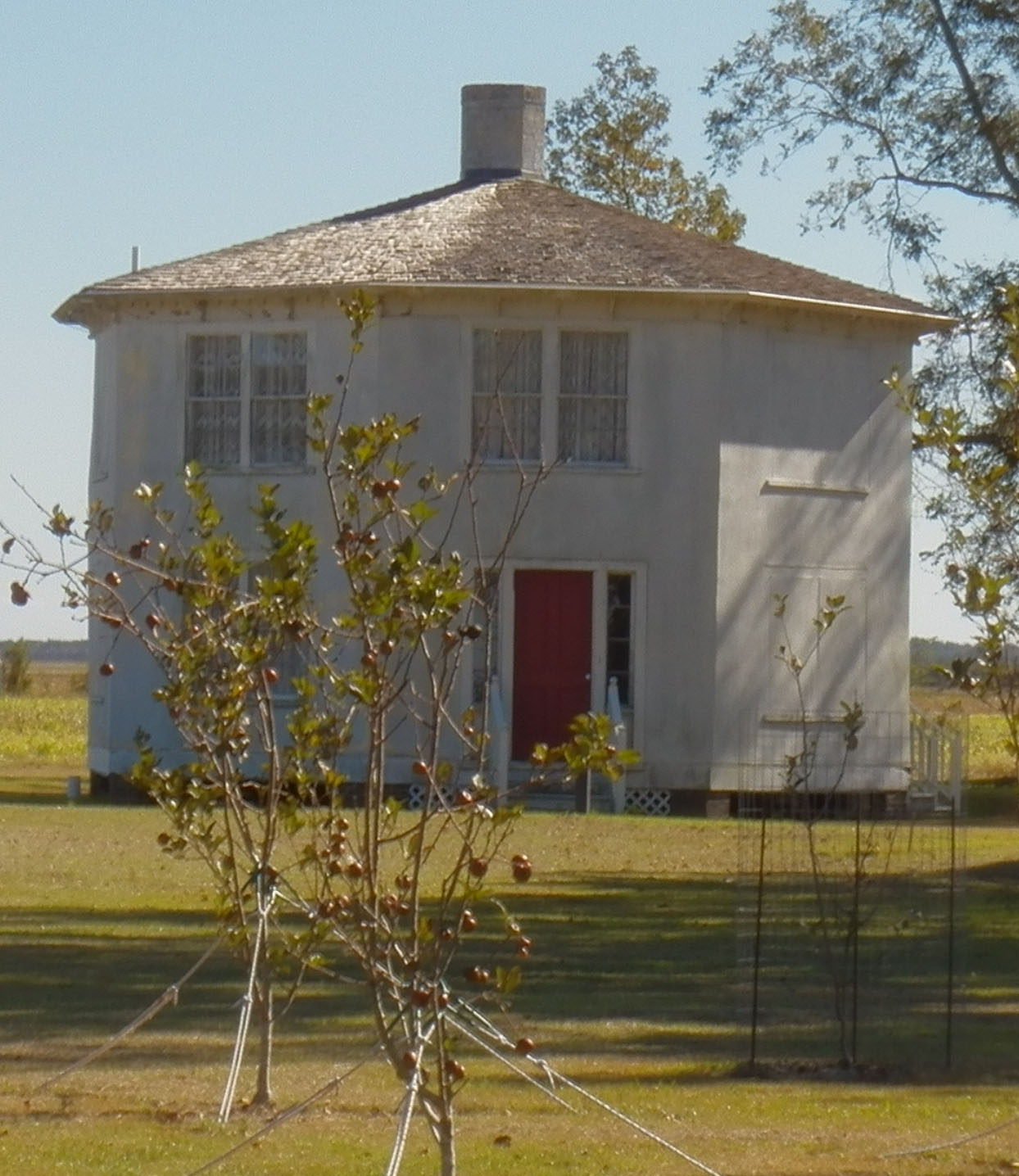
- Octagon House

- Location within North Carolina Location within the United States
- Nearest city: E of Lake Landing at 30868 US 264, Lake Landing Township, near Engelhard, North Carolina
- Coordinates: 35°29′5″N 76°3′11″W
- Area: 1.4 acres (0.57 ha)
- Built: c. 1855
- Architectural style: Octagon Mode
- NRHP reference No.: 78001960
- Added to NRHP: September 1, 1978

The Inkwell, also known as The Octagon House, is an historic octagonal house located at 30868 US 264 in Engelhard, North Carolina on Lake Mattamuskeet. It was built about 1857 by Dr. William T. Sparrow. The house is an eight-sided, two-story, frame dwelling, sitting on a brick pier foundation. Its boardwall construction and use of verticals only around the doors and windows follows Howland's cottage design in Orson S. Fowler's 1848 book entitled The Octagon House, a Home for All. A restoration of the Octagon House in the 1980s returned its appearance to its earlier conception using plaster interior walls, a stuccoed exterior and a wood shingle roof. The house features a central octagonal chimney of stuccoed brick.

On September 1, 1978, it was added to the National Register of Historic Places. It is located in the Lake Landing Historic District.

A Mattamuskeet apple orchard has been planted on the grounds of The Octagon House. Trees were grafted from the wood of surviving fruit trees that were featured in nursery catalogues of the area during the mid-19th century.

Several Open Houses are held throughout the year and special group tours may be arranged by appointment.
