= Lake Mattamuskeet =

Lake in North Carolina, United States

- Location within North Carolina Location within the United States
- Location: Hyde County, North Carolina
- Coordinates: 35°29′55″N 76°11′20″W
- Basin countries: United States
- Max. length: 18 mi (29 km)
- Max. width: 7 mi (11 km)
- Average depth: 2–3 ft (0.61–0.91 m)

Lake Mattamuskeet is the largest natural lake in North Carolina. It is a shallow coastal lake, averaging 2–3 feet (0.61–0.91 m) in depth, and stretches 18 miles (29 km) long and 7 miles (11 km) wide. Lake Mattamuskeet lies on the Albemarle-Pamlico Peninsula.

Lake Mattamuskeet is the location of Mattamuskeet National Wildlife Refuge. This refuge as well as surrounding public and private lands in eastern North Carolina are a major wintering site for waterfowl including ducks like northern pintail and green-wing teal, geese like Canada geese and tundra swans.

Water quality in the lake has declined since the early 1990s, along with a substantial loss of submerged aquatic vegetation.

== Ecology and water quality ==
Throughout recent decades, Lake Mattamuskeet has been experiencing declining water quality and loss of submerged aquatic vegetation. Increases in the lake's water nutrients, turbidity, and phytoplankton have reduced water clarity and contributed to the aquatic vegetation decline. Reduced drainage to Pamlico Sound as well as an overabundance of invasive common carp have also contributed to the lake's conditions. Cyanobacterial blooms have also been reported in the lake. A 2024 study of cyanobacteria collected from Lake Mattamuskeet found genetic potential for production of toxic or biologically active compounds; however, the study did not confirm that toxins were being produced.

== Gallery ==
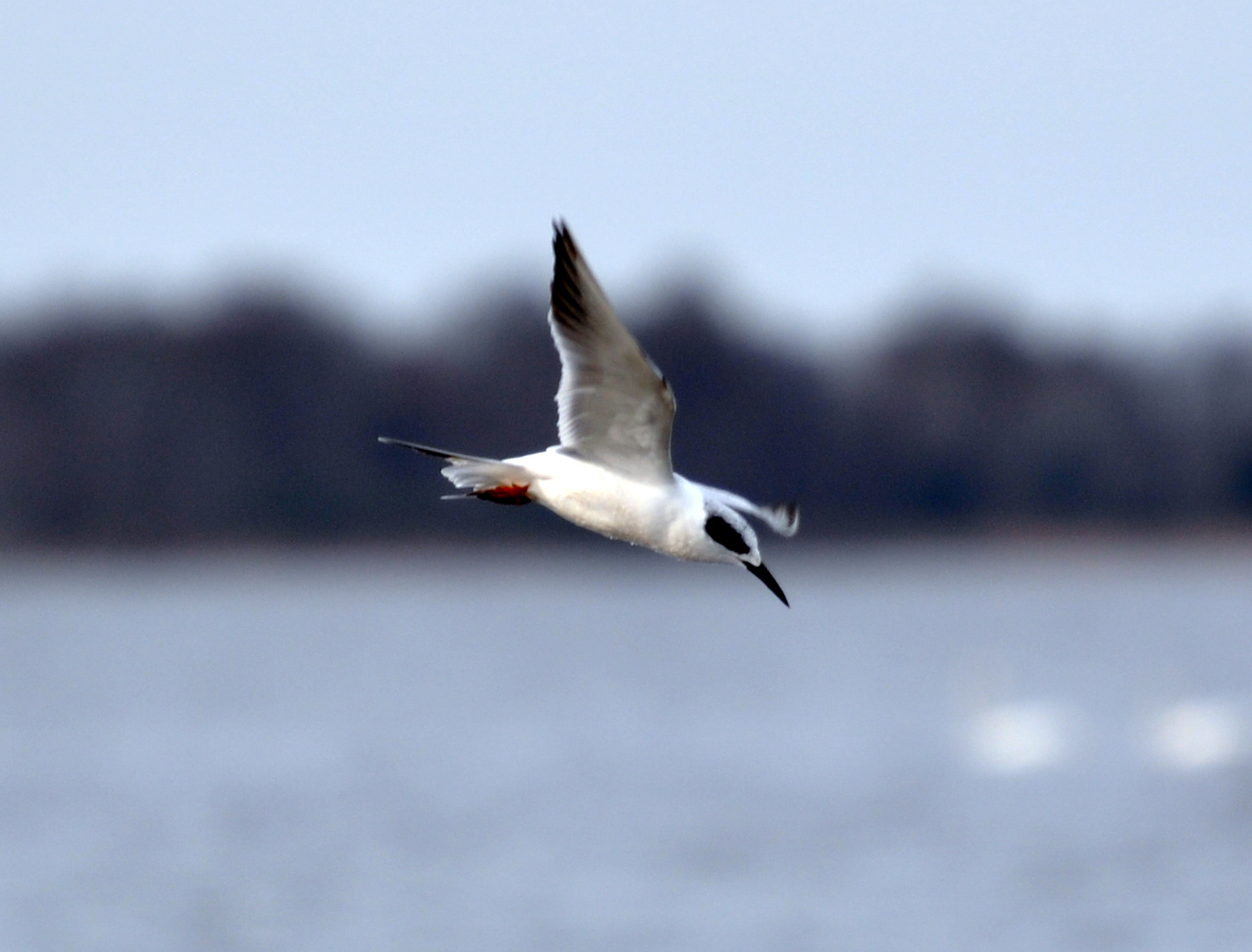
Forster's tern fishing on Lake Mattamuskeet

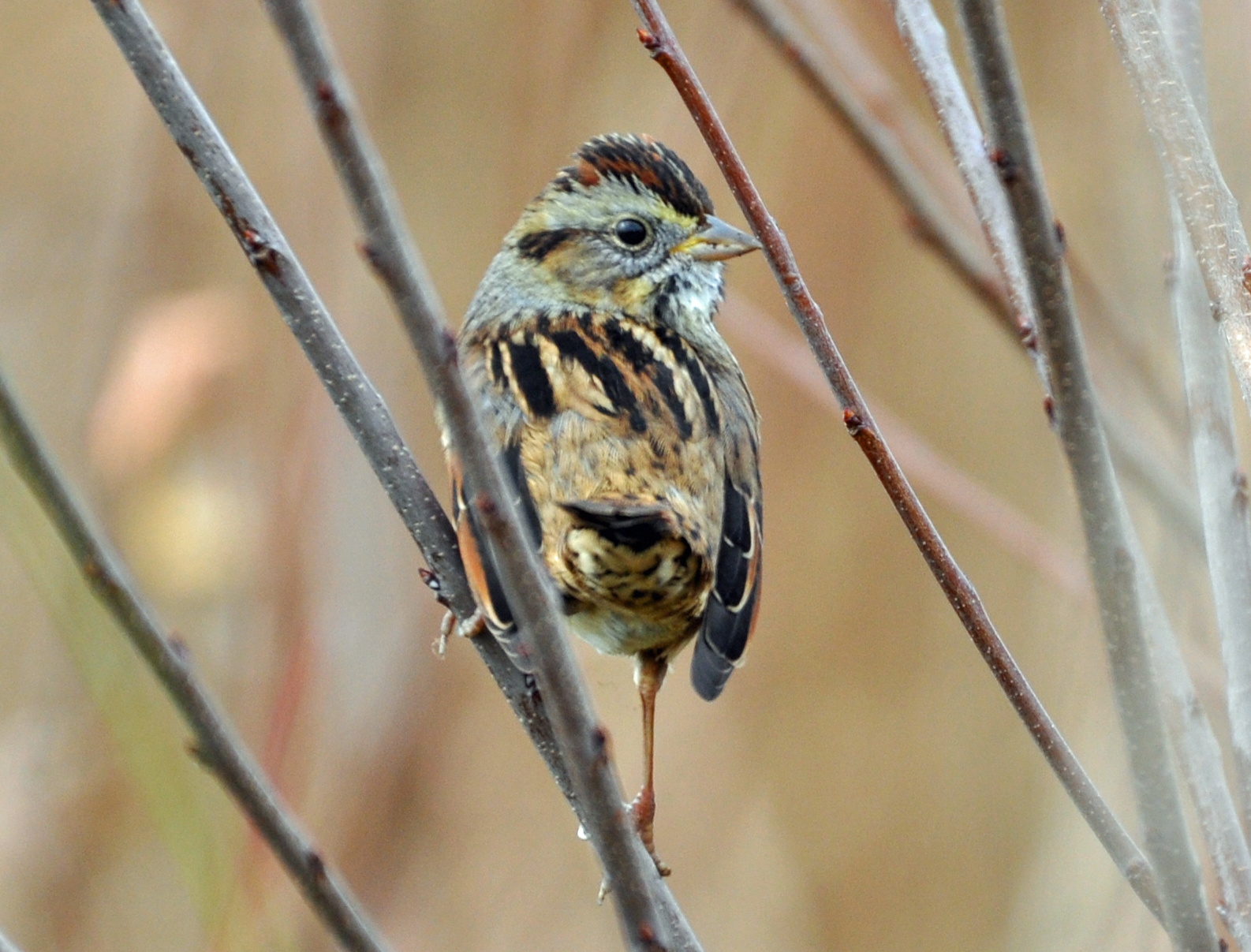
Swamp sparrow at Lake Mattamuskeet

== New Holland ==
New Holland is a community in Hyde County, North Carolina, located along the southern shore of Lake Mattamuskeet. Between 1911 and 1934, three private investment companies partnered with the public Mattamuskeet Drainage District to build the world's largest capacity pumping plant and dredge 130 miles (210 km) of large navigable canals to drain 50,000-acre (200 km^{2}) Lake Mattamuskeet for residential, commercial, and agricultural development. The lake drainage project also gave badly needed drainage relief to about 550 farmers around the lake whose farms drained by gravity into the huge lakebed. The investors created a community within the reclaimed lakebed and named it "New Holland," after similar land reclamation projects in the Netherlands. The drainage project ended when the third private owner sold the lake property to the United States government in 1934 to allow the creation of a migratory bird refuge. Today, Lake Mattamuskeet and the old town site of New Holland are on Mattamuskeet National Wildlife Refuge. The community on the south central side of Lake Mattamuskeet is still called "New Holland Community."
