= Wynne's Folly =

Historic house in North Carolina, United States

- U.S. National Register of Historic Places
- Location within North Carolina Location within the United States
- Location: W of Engelhard on U.S. 264, Engelhard, North Carolina
- Coordinates: 35°30′1″N 76°1′41″W
- Area: 5 acres (2.0 ha)
- Built: 1848
- Architectural style: Greek Revival, Vernacular Greek Revival
- NRHP reference No.: 77001002
- Added to NRHP: December 6, 1977

Wynne's Folly, also known as the Clarke House, is a historic plantation house located near Engelhard, North Carolina. It was built about 1848, and is two-story, five bay by five bay, vernacular Greek Revival style frame dwelling. It sits on a low brick pier foundation, shallow pyramidal roof pierced by pairs of interior end chimneys, and a wide frieze and overhanging cornice.

It was added to the National Register of Historic Places in 1977.

Wynne's Folly was built for Richard Wynn, who wished to impress a woman.
