= Lake Mattamuskeet Pump Station =

Historic building in North Carolina, US

- U.S. National Register of Historic Places
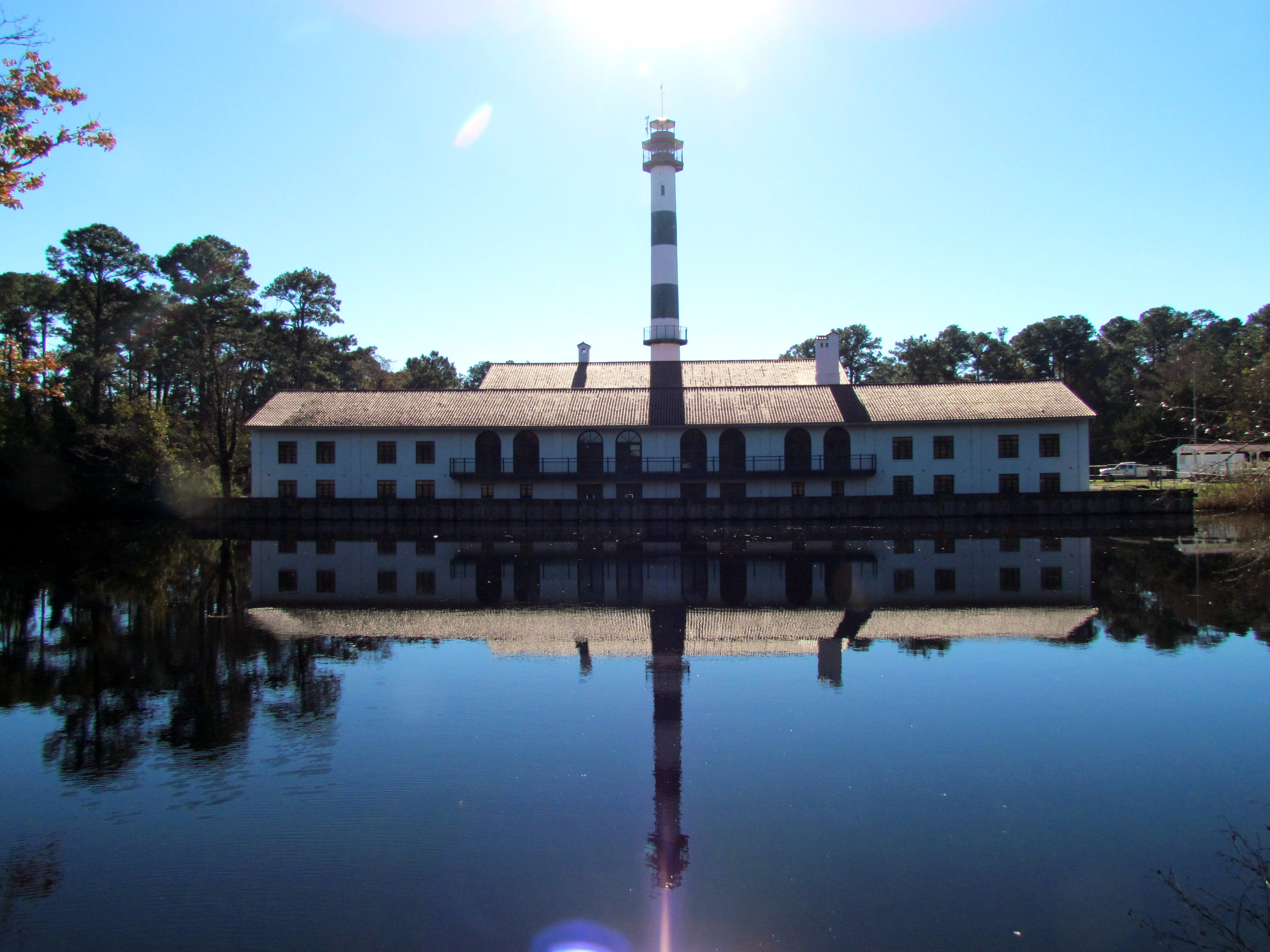
- The lodge and the lake in November, 2015

- Location within North Carolina Location within the United States
- Location: E of Swanquarter, near Swan Quarter, North Carolina
- Coordinates: 35°27′6″N 76°10′30″W
- Area: 0.3 acres (0.12 ha)
- Built: 1911
- Built by: New Holland Corp.
- NRHP reference No.: 80002849
- Added to NRHP: May 28, 1980

Lake Mattamuskeet Pump Station, also known as Mattamuskeet Lodge, is a historic pumping station building located on Lake Mattamuskeet at the Mattamuskeet National Wildlife Refuge near Swan Quarter, Hyde County, North Carolina. It was built in 1911, and is a three-story 14,977 square foot brick building. In 1934, it was remodeled as headquarters building and hotel accommodation for visitors after acquisition of Lake Mattamuskeet by the U. S. Government. The building contains 38 rooms and is connected to a 120-foot-high tower with stairway.

It was listed on the National Register of Historic Places in 1980.
