= Engelhard, North Carolina =

- Census-designated place
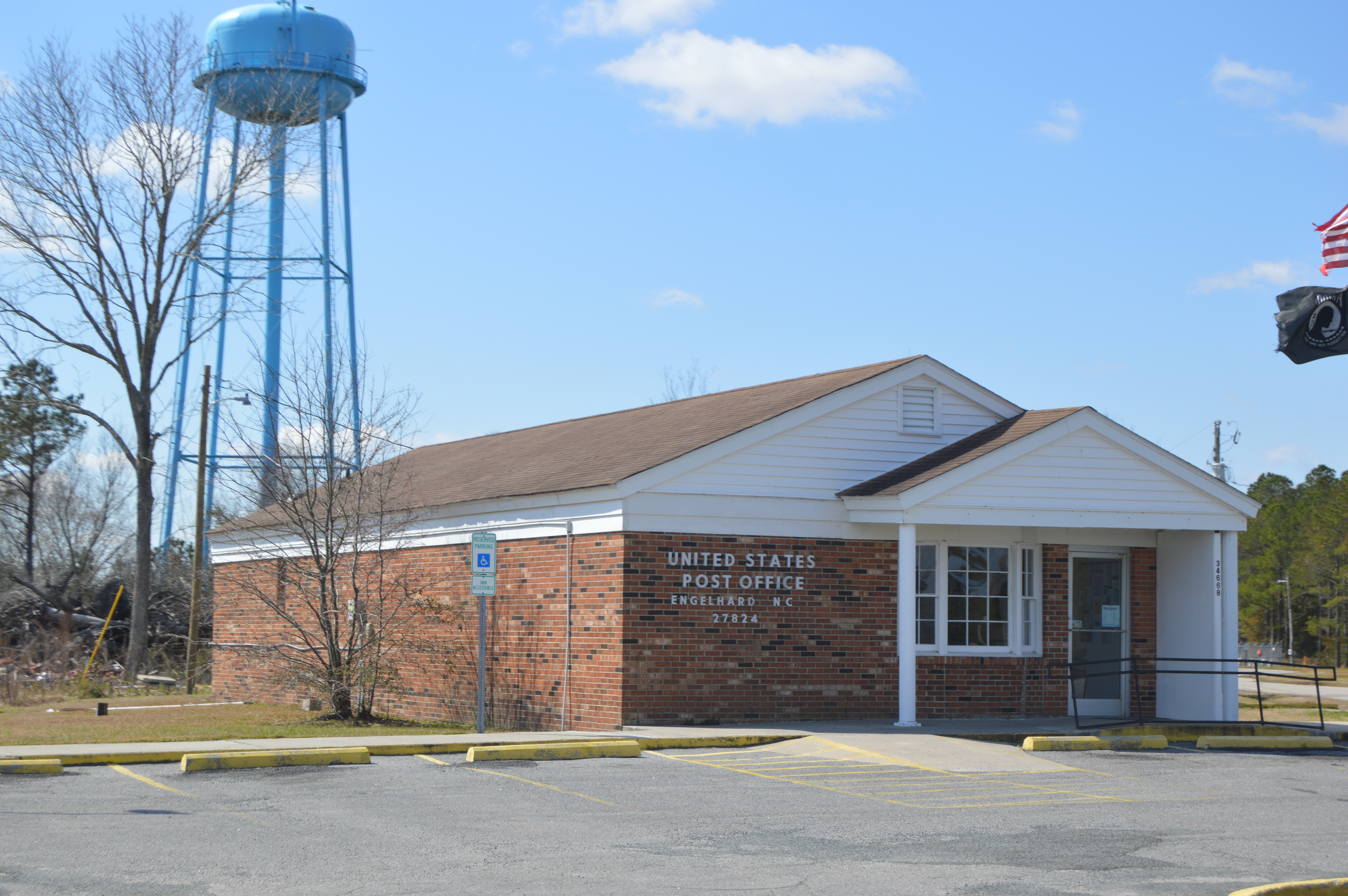
- Post office and water tower

- Location within North Carolina Location within the United States
- Coordinates: 35°30′33″N 76°00′34″W
- Country: United States
- State: North Carolina
- County: Hyde

Area
  - Total: 3.23 sq mi (8.36 km^{2})
  - Land: 3.23 sq mi (8.36 km^{2})
  - Water: 0 sq mi (0.00 km^{2})
- Elevation: 0 ft (0 m)

Population (2020)
  - Total: 374
  - Density: 115.9/sq mi (44.73/km^{2})
- Time zone: UTC-5 (Eastern (EST))
  - Summer (DST): UTC-4 (EDT)
- ZIP Code: 27824
- Area code: 252
- GNIS feature ID: 2628623
- FIPS code: 37-21380

Engelhard is a census-designated place (CDP) and fishing community in Lake Landing Township on the mainland of Hyde County, North Carolina, United States. It has access to Pamlico Sound. As of the 2020 census, Engelhard had a population of 374.

== History ==
Inkwell and Wynne's Folly are listed on the National Register of Historic Places.

== Geography ==
Engelhard is in eastern Hyde County along U.S. Route 264, which leads northeast 46 miles (74 km) to Manteo and west 47 miles (76 km) to Belhaven.

According to the U.S. Census Bureau, the CDP has a total area of 3.22 square miles (8.33 km^{2}), all land. The community is at the head of Far Creek, a small tidal inlet of Pamlico Sound.

== Demographics ==
Historical population
Census	Pop.	Note	%±
2020	374		—
U.S. Decennial Census

=== 2020 census ===
Engelhard racial composition
Race	Number	Percentage
White (non-Hispanic)	196	52.41%
Black or African American (non-Hispanic)	107	28.61%
Other/Mixed	25	6.68%
Hispanic or Latino	46	12.3%

As of the 2020 United States census, there were 374 people, 120 households, and 109 families residing in the CDP.

== Climate ==
This region experiences hot and wet summers with rainy days. According to the Köppen Climate Classification system, Engelhard has a humid subtropical climate (Köppen Cfa).

There are cool winters during which intense rainfall occurs.

Snow in Engelhard is possible in winter months.

Climate data for Engelhard, North Carolina
Month	Jan	Feb	Mar	Apr	May	Jun	Jul	Aug	Sep	Oct	Nov	Dec	Year
Mean daily maximum °F (°C)	54.0 (12.2)	58.0 (14.4)	65.0 (18.3)	73.0 (22.8)	80.0 (26.7)	86.0 (30.0)	89.0 (31.7)	88.0 (31.1)	83.0 (28.3)	75.0 (23.9)	67.0 (19.4)	59.0 (15.0)	73.1 (22.8)
Mean daily minimum °F (°C)	33.0 (0.6)	36.0 (2.2)	42.0 (5.6)	49.0 (9.4)	58.0 (14.4)	66.0 (18.9)	70.0 (21.1)	69.0 (20.6)	65.0 (18.3)	54.0 (12.2)	45.0 (7.2)	38.0 (3.3)	52.1 (11.2)
Average precipitation inches (mm)	4.5 (110)	2.9 (74)	3.4 (86)	2.9 (74)	3.9 (99)	3.8 (97)	4.6 (120)	5.7 (140)	4.3 (110)	3.5 (89)	3.0 (76)	2.9 (74)	45.4 (1,149)
Average snowfall inches (cm)	0.3 (0.76)	0.5 (1.3)	0 (0)	0 (0)	0 (0)	0 (0)	0 (0)	0 (0)	0 (0)	0 (0)	0 (0)	0 (0)	0.8 (2.06)
Average snowy days	0	0	0	0	0	0	0	0	0	0	0	0	0
Source: NOAA

== Education ==
The local school is Mattamuskeet School of Hyde County Schools.

In the de jure segregation era, the grade school for black students was, by the 1960s, Davis School, a consolidation of earlier such schools, in Engelhard. The high school for black students was Hyde County Training School in Sladesville. The high school for white students was East Hyde School.

BHM Regional Library operates the Engelhard Library.

== See also ==
- List of census-designated places in North Carolina
