= Albin B. Swindell House and Store =

Historic commercial building in North Carolina, United States

- U.S. National Register of Historic Places
- Location within North Carolina Location within the United States
- Location: US 264, Swindell Fork, North Carolina
- Coordinates: 35°26′10″N 76°16′56″W
- Area: 207.8 acres (84.1 ha)
- Built: 1875
- NRHP reference No.: 86001641
- Added to NRHP: August 14, 1986

Albin B. Swindell House and Store is a historic home and general merchandise store located at Swindell Fork, Hyde County, North Carolina. The store was established in 1875, and originally operated out of a barn. It moved to its current building in 1890. The store building also housed a post office and an early telephone. The house was enlarged to two stories in 1903, at which time the contributing smokehouse and pumphouse were constructed.

It was added to the National Register of Historic Places in 1986.
