= Swan Quarter, North Carolina =

- Census-designated place
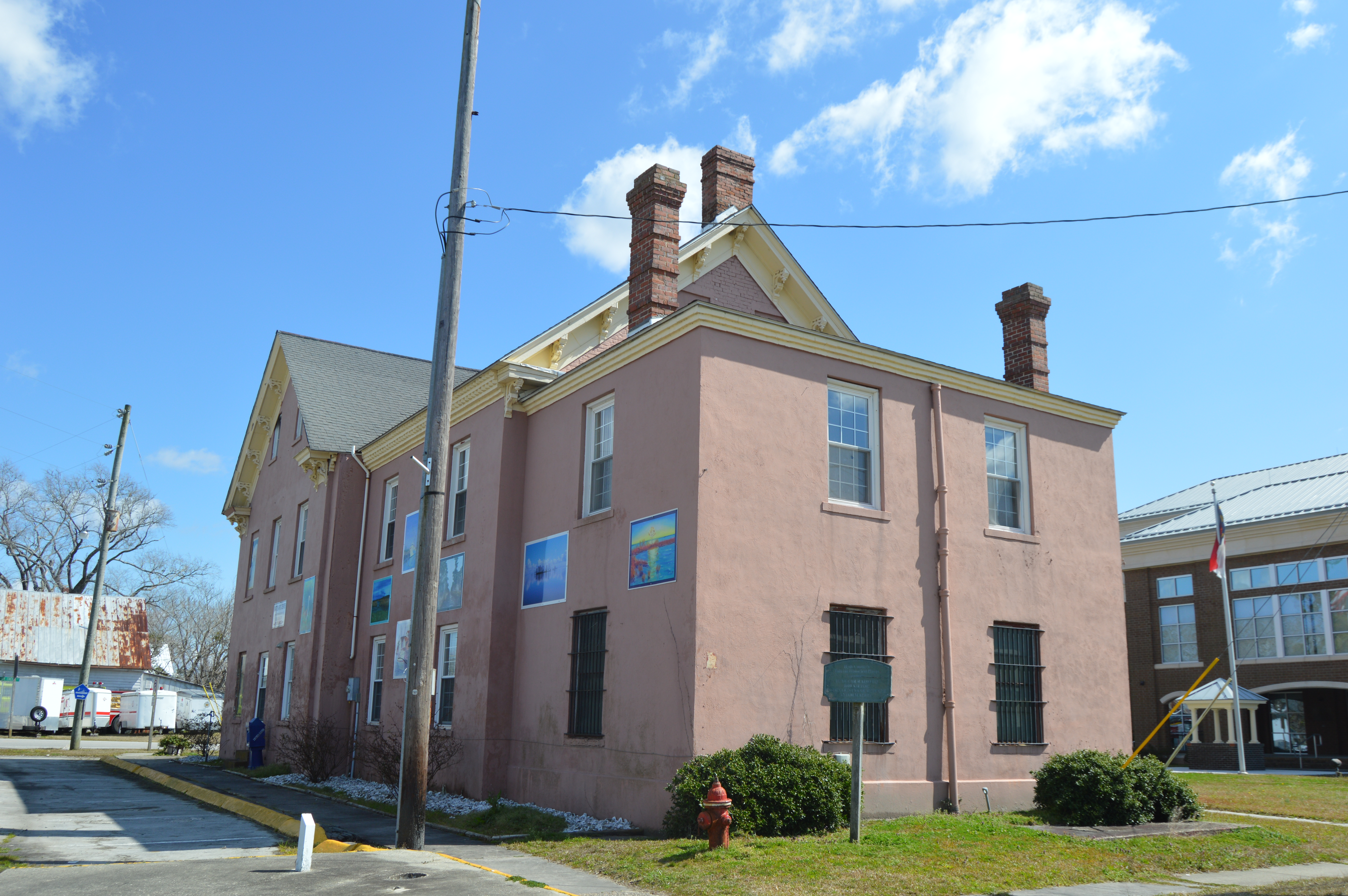
- Former Hyde County Courthouse, with the current courthouse at right

- Location within North Carolina Location within the United States
- Country: United States
- State: North Carolina
- County: Hyde

Area
  - Total: 3.95 sq mi (10.24 km^{2})
  - Land: 3.95 sq mi (10.23 km^{2})
  - Water: 0.0039 sq mi (0.01 km^{2})
- Elevation: 3 ft (0.91 m)

Population (2020)
  - Total: 275
  - Density: 69.6/sq mi (26.88/km^{2})
- Time zone: UTC-5 (Eastern (EST))
  - Summer (DST): UTC-4 (EDT)
- ZIP code: 27885
- Area code: 252
- GNIS feature ID: 1022864
- FIPS code: 37-66340

Swan Quarter (also spelled Swanquarter) is an unincorporated community and census-designated place (CDP) in Hyde County, North Carolina, United States. It is the county seat of Hyde County. As of the 2020 census, Swan Quarter had a population of 275.

== Geography ==
Swan Quarter is in western Hyde County at latitude 35.405 N and longitude 76.331 W. The elevation is 3 feet (0.91 m) above sea level. It is located on Swanquarter Bay, an inlet of Pamlico Sound.

U.S. Route 264 runs along the northern edge of the community, leading east 69 miles (111 km) to Manteo and west 51 miles (82 km) to Washington.

According to the U.S. Census Bureau, the Swan Quarter CDP has a total area of 3.9 square miles (10.2 km^{2}), of which 0.004 square miles (0.01 km^{2}), or 0.10%, are water.

=== Climate ===
Climate data for SWANQUARTER FERRY, NC, 1991-2020 normals
Month	Jan	Feb	Mar	Apr	May	Jun	Jul	Aug	Sep	Oct	Nov	Dec	Year
Mean daily maximum °F (°C)	53.1 (11.7)	55.5 (13.1)	61.8 (16.6)	71.1 (21.7)	78.7 (25.9)	86.6 (30.3)	89.5 (31.9)	88.0 (31.1)	82.8 (28.2)	74.2 (23.4)	64.5 (18.1)	56.5 (13.6)	71.9 (22.2)
Daily mean °F (°C)	44.6 (7.0)	45.6 (7.6)	51.9 (11.1)	61.5 (16.4)	70.5 (21.4)	78.4 (25.8)	81.6 (27.6)	80.3 (26.8)	75.0 (23.9)	65.6 (18.7)	54.9 (12.7)	47.8 (8.8)	63.1 (17.3)
Mean daily minimum °F (°C)	36.1 (2.3)	35.6 (2.0)	41.9 (5.5)	51.9 (11.1)	62.2 (16.8)	70.1 (21.2)	73.7 (23.2)	72.5 (22.5)	67.2 (19.6)	56.9 (13.8)	45.3 (7.4)	39.1 (3.9)	54.4 (12.4)
Average precipitation inches (mm)	4.20 (107)	3.27 (83)	3.58 (91)	4.19 (106)	4.62 (117)	5.10 (130)	4.77 (121)	6.13 (156)	6.31 (160)	3.65 (93)	3.98 (101)	3.61 (92)	53.41 (1,357)
Average precipitation days (≥ 0.01 in)	9.1	8.9	7.7	8.6	8.6	9.5	10.3	10.4	9.1	7.1	7.5	9.3	106.1
Source: NOAA

== Demographics ==
Historical population
Census	Pop.	Note	%±
2020	275		—
U.S. Decennial Census

=== 2020 census ===
Swan Quarter racial composition
Race	Number	Percentage
White (non-Hispanic)	197	71.64%
Black or African American (non-Hispanic)	55	20.0%
Other/Mixed	6	2.18%
Hispanic or Latino	17	6.18%

As of the 2020 United States census, there were 275 people, 164 households, and 153 families residing in the CDP.

=== 2010 census ===
The population, at the time of the 2010 census, was 324.

== History ==
In the 18th century, Samuel Swann settled along Pamlico Sound near the head of Swan Bay. Swann's Quarter was the first name given to this settlement. Eventually shortened to Swan Quarter, it became the county seat in 1836.

The Hyde County Courthouse and Lake Mattamuskeet Pump Station, also known as Mattamuskeet Lodge, are listed on the National Register of Historic Places.

== Transportation ==
A 50-car ferry connects Swan Quarter in Hyde County on the mainland with Ocracoke Island, crossing Pamlico Sound in two and a half hours.

== Wildlife and preservation ==
Mattamuskeet National Wildlife Refuge is located 9 miles (14 km) east of Swan Quarter by U.S. Route 264 and North Carolina Highway 94 in Hyde County. It provides habitat for migratory waterfowl and other birds, for endangered species such as bald eagles, peregrine falcons, and American alligators. It also provides wildlife-related recreation and environmental education for the public on its 50,180 acres (203.1 km^{2}) of land.

== Education ==
The local school is Mattamuskeet School of Hyde County Schools.

In the de jure segregation era, the grade school for black students was, by the 1960s, O. A. Peay School, a consolidation of earlier such schools, near Swan Quarter. The high school for black students was Hyde County Training School in Sladesville. The high school for white students was West Hyde School.

Peay's and Hyde County Training School's students held school reunions, though these diminished by 2017.
