= Lake Landing Historic District =

Historic district in North Carolina, United States

- U.S. National Register of Historic Places
- U.S. Historic district
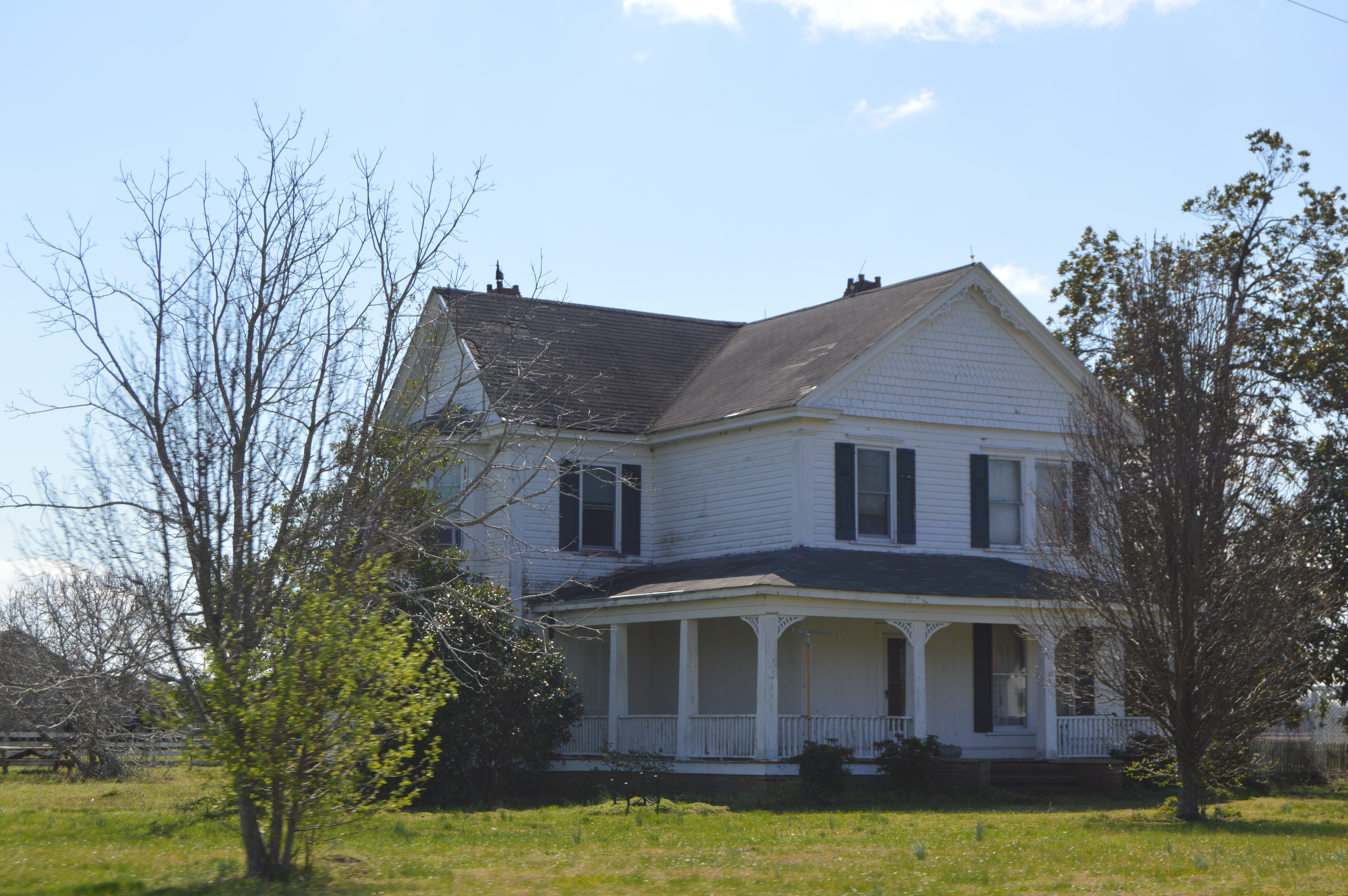
- House northwest of Nebraska

- Location within North Carolina Location within the United States
- Location: Roughly bounded by Mattamuskeet Refuge Boundary, Middletown, Nebraska, SR 1110, and US 264, near Lake Landing, North Carolina
- Coordinates: 35°27′41″N 76°03′56″W
- Area: 13,400 acres (5,400 ha)
- Built: 1785
- Built by: Caleb Brooks, et al.
- Architectural style: Greek Revival, Queen Anne, Coastal Cottage
- NRHP reference No.: 86000786
- Added to NRHP: March 10, 1986

Lake Landing Historic District is a national historic district located near Lake Landing, North Carolina. The district encompasses 226 contributing buildings, 2 contributing sites, and 4 contributing structures related to agricultural complexes near Lake Landing. The district includes notable examples of Greek Revival, Queen Anne, and Coastal Cottage style architecture dating from about 1785 to the early-20th century. The Dr. William Sparrow octagon house, also known as Inkwell, is listed separately. Other notable buildings include the Fulford-Watson House, Gibbs Family House, Young-Roper-Jarvis House, Joseph Young House, Swindell-Mann-Clarke House, Amity Methodist Church, Chapel Hill Academy, St. George's Episcopal Church, John Edward Spencer Store, and George Israel Watson House (1896).

It was added to the National Register of Historic Places in 1986.
