= Mattamuskeet National Wildlife Refuge =

Federally protected wildlife refuge located in North Carolina

- IUCN category IV (habitat/species management area)
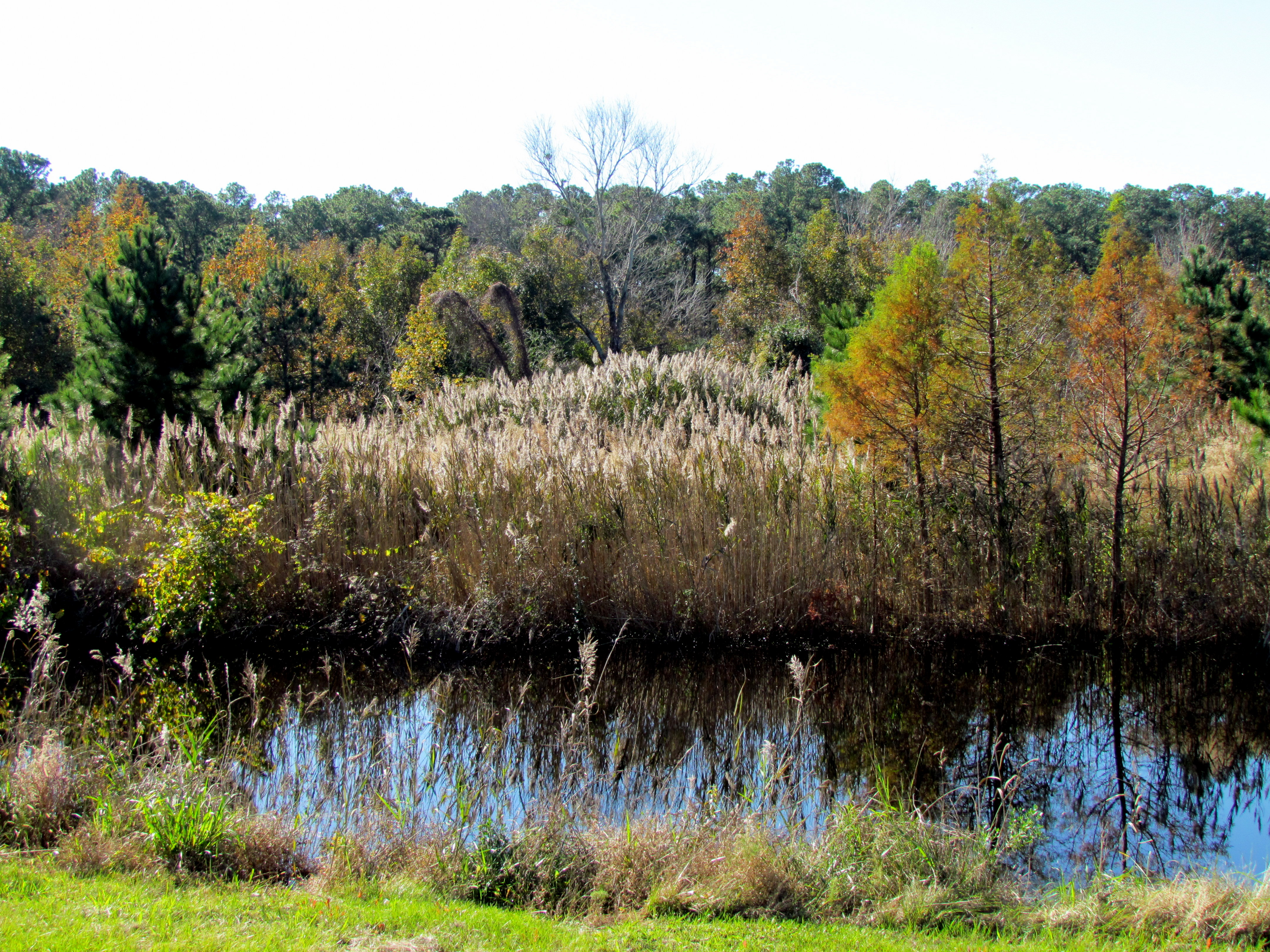
- A wetland at the refuge

- Location within North Carolina Location within the United States
- Location: Hyde County, North Carolina, United States
- Nearest city: Swan Quarter, North Carolina
- Coordinates: 35°30′N 76°12′W
- Area: 50,173 acres (203.04 km^{2})
- Established: 1934
- Governing body: U.S. Fish and Wildlife Service
- Website: Mattamuskeet National Wildlife Refuge

The Mattamuskeet National Wildlife Refuge is a federally protected wildlife refuge located within Hyde County, North Carolina, United States. North Carolina's largest natural lake, Lake Mattamuskeet, is located entirely within the National Wildlife Refuge. The refuge has a total area of 50,173 acres (203.04 km^{2}).

It is home to the mammalian species white-tailed deer, river otters, red wolves, bobcats, and black bears.

The Lake Mattamuskeet Pump Station, also known as Mattamuskeet Lodge, was listed on the National Register of Historic Places in 1980.

== Ecology and ecosystem ==
The ecology and ecosystem of the Mattamuskeet National Wildlife Refuge are closely intertwined with Lake Mattamuskeet. All of the refuge's fish, birds, plants, and other wildlife depend on it. Recently, Lake Mattamuskeet has been experiencing a decline in both water quality and submerged aquatic vegetation. The lake has also seen an increase in nutrients and harmful algal blooms. These factors can cause major problems for the quality of aquatic habitats in the refuge. Different features within the refuge can also have an effect on the surrounding ecosystem. Certain parts of the refuge serve as habitats for migratory birds. During seasonal water drawdowns, these areas can release nitrogen into Lake Mattamuskeet, which can lead to a change in levels of nutrients in the water. Movement of aquatic species within the refuge can also be impacted by certain water-control structures. Alewife, white perch, American eel, and blue crab movements between Lake Mattamuskeet and the surrounding waters are affected by these structures. When put together, these factors show Lake Mattamuskeet and its surrounding ecosystem are connected to different parts of the refuge.

== See also ==
- List of largest National Wildlife Refuges
- Alligator River National Wildlife Refuge – A similar refuge where red wolves live in the wild
