= Hyde County Courthouse (North Carolina) =

Historic courthouse in North Carolina, US

- U.S. National Register of Historic Places
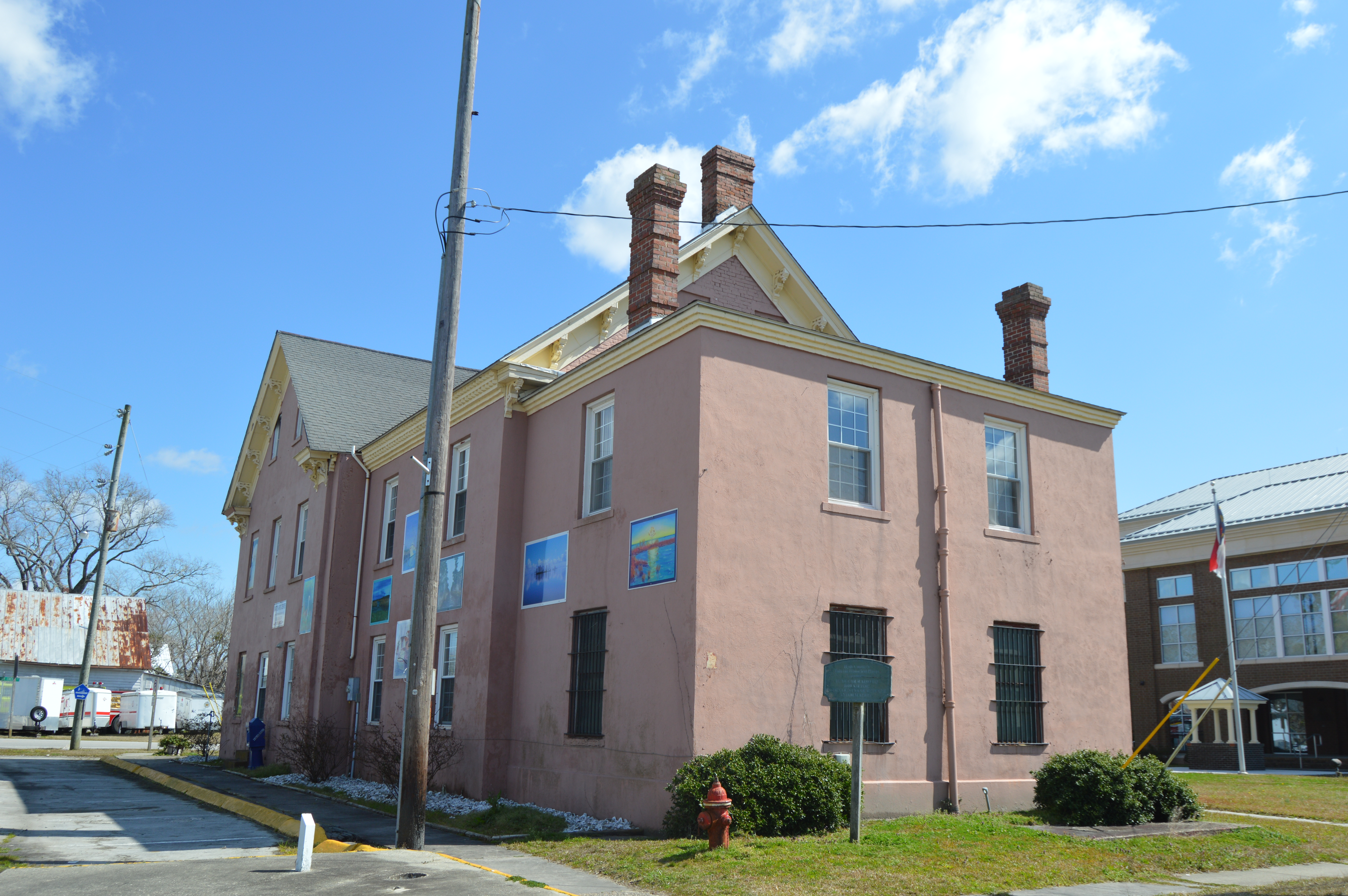
- Northern and western sides

- Location within North Carolina Location within the United States
- Location: 20 Oyster Creek Rd., Swan Quarter, North Carolina
- Coordinates: 35°24′21″N 76°19′47″W
- Area: less than one acre
- Built: 1854-1855
- MPS: North Carolina County Courthouses TR
- NRHP reference No.: 79001726
- Added to NRHP: May 10, 1979

The Hyde County Courthouse is a historic courthouse building located at Swan Quarter, Hyde County, North Carolina. It was built in 1854–1855, and is a two-story, T-shaped stuccoed brick building. It has a Victorian-style corbelled mousetooth cornice and ornately turned brackets. The courthouse was remodeled in 1878 and 1909 and drastically renovated in 1964.

It was listed on the National Register of Historic Places in 1979.
