= Chowanoc =

Historical Native American tribe in North Carolina

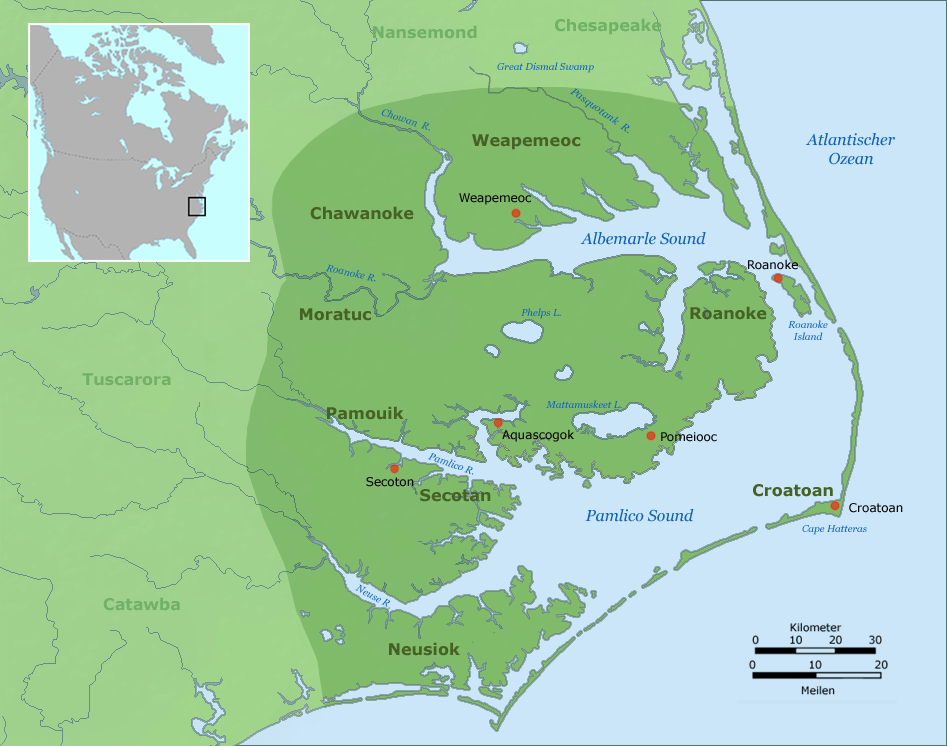
- 16th-century territories of the North Carolina Algonquian

Total population
- Extinct as a tribe (1820)

Regions with significant populations
- Chowan River, North Carolina; later Catawba River, South Carolina

Languages
- Algonquian

Religion
- Tribal religion

Related ethnic groups
- Coree, Machapunga, Weapemeoc

The Chowanoc, also Chowanoke, were an Algonquian-speaking Native American tribe who historically lived near the Chowan River in North Carolina. At the time of the first English contact in 1580s, they were a large and influential tribe and remained so through the mid-17th century. In 1677, after the Chowanoc War, English colonists set aside a reservation for the tribe near Bennett Creek.

The Chowanoc suffered high mortality due to infectious disease, including a smallpox epidemic in 1696. By 1733 descendants of the Chowanoc had assimilated with the Tuscarora. In 1775, James Adair, an Irish-born trader and historian, noted ‘Chowan’ as a language still spoken within the Catawba Nation in South Carolina. The Chowanoc are academically considered to have ceased to exist as an independent entity by, at the latest, 1820.

== Name ==
The name Chowanoc has also been spelled Chawanook, Chowanock, Chowanoke, and Chawwonock. They are also known as the Chowanoc Confederacy. Their name is Algonquian and translates as "they of the south" or "southerners".

== Territory ==
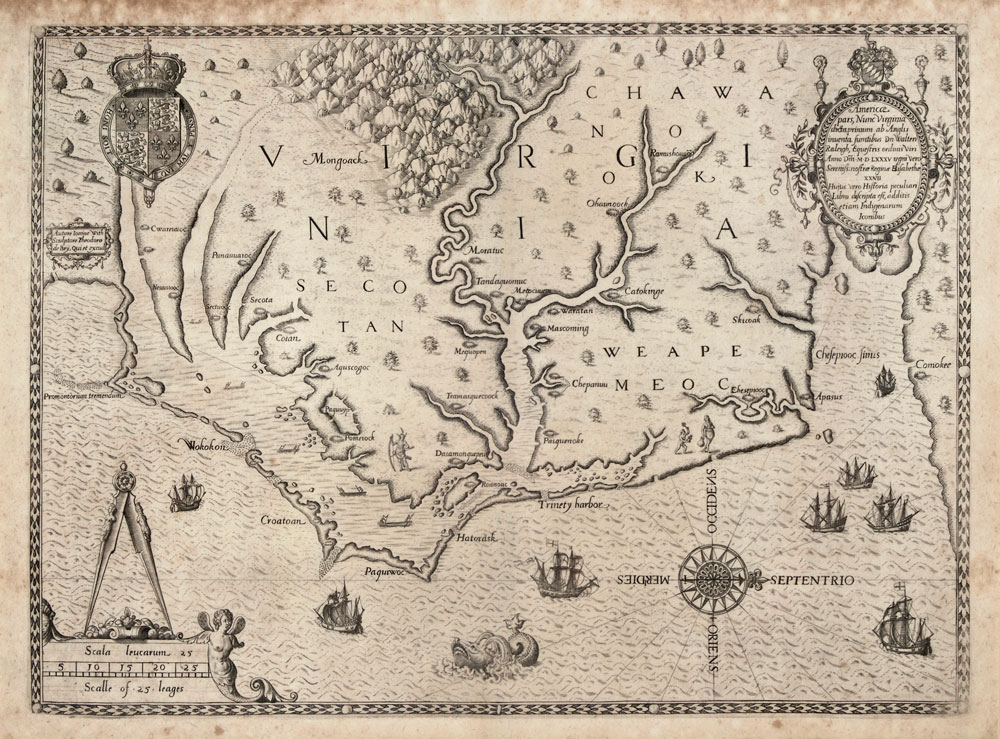
1585 map by Theodor de Bry with Chawanook territory in the right, top (east)

The Chowanoc had settlements from north of the confluence of the Chowan and Meherrin Rivers to the mouth of the Chowan River. Smaller towns were likely built along Bennett Creek and tributaries of the Meherrin and Wiccacon Rivers.

== Archaeology ==
In the 1980s, archaeologists explored the primary town also called Chowanoc and learned that it was first settled in the 10th century CE.

== History ==
=== 16th century ===
About 1,200 to 2,500 When English colonists arrived in 1584, Chowanoc lived along the Chowan River near the Nottoway and Meherrin rivers, and they were most populous tribe in their region. Colonial Governor Ralph Lane encountered the tribe when they were led by the elderly Chief Menatonon (fl. 1580s). Lane's took Menatonon's son Skiko hostage to force the chief to assist English colonists in their efforts to cultivate positive relationships with neighbor tribes and to ensure Menatonon’s support of the English colonists. When Skiko attempted to escape, Lane “laid him in the bylboes, threatening to cut off his head.”

Their villages included Maraton, Ramushonok, and Obanoak and likely also included Metocaum and Catoking.

English mathematician and cartographer Thomas Harriot recorded that the Chowanoc had 18 villages. Harriot estimated that the tribe could mobilize 700 or 800 warriors in a battle. Lane described one town as being large enough to muster 700 to 800 warriors, which meant the capital's population was likely more than 2,100. Theodor de Bry's 1590 map placed five of the tribe's villages on the Chowan River.

=== 17th century ===
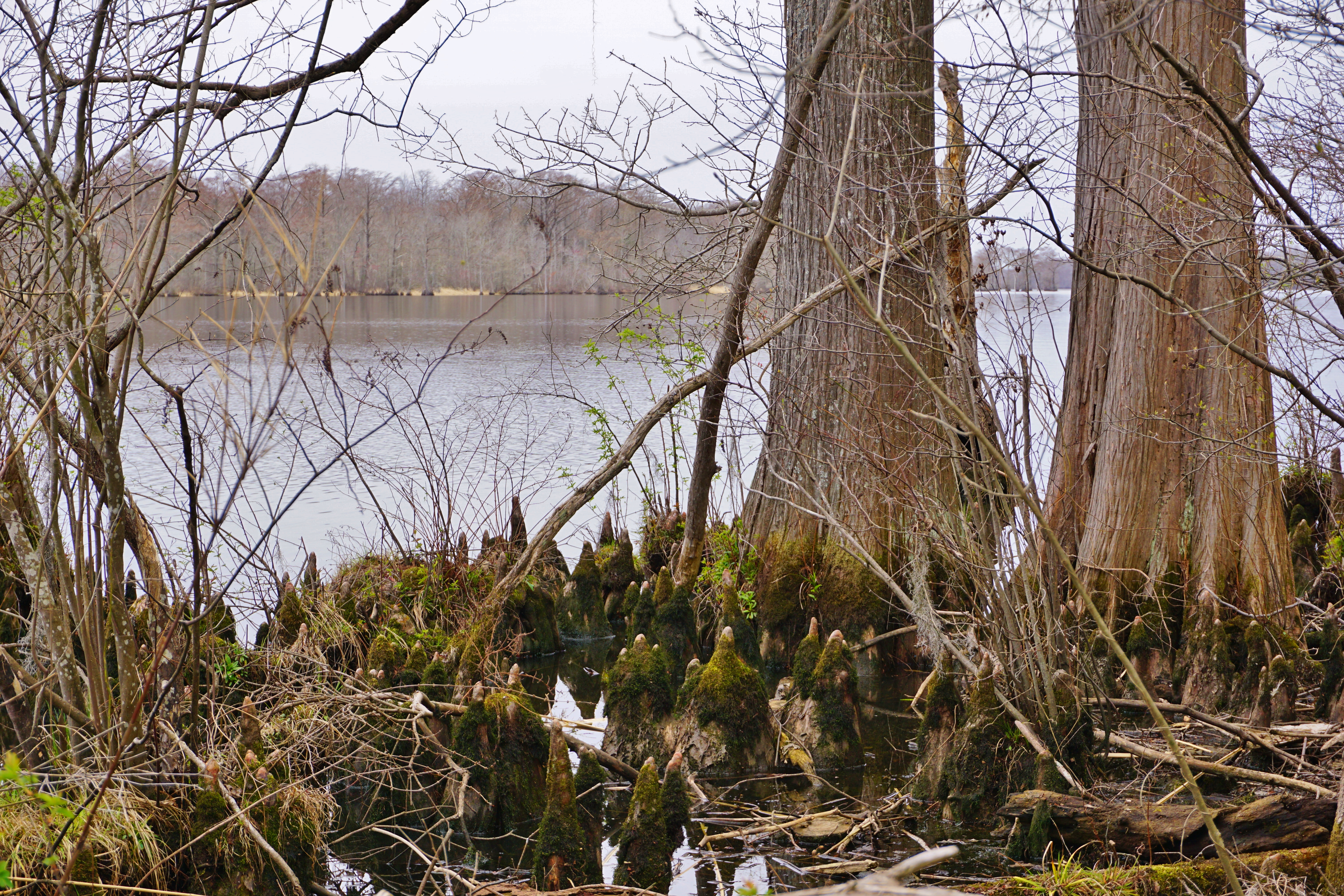
Wetlands along the Chowan swamp

In 1607, an English colonial expedition in the area, on orders from Captain John Smith of Jamestown, found that few Chowanoc people were left along the Chowan River. They had been reduced to one settlement across the river in Gates County on Bennett Creek.

In 1607 an English colonial expedition, in the area on orders from Captain John Smith of Jamestown, found that few Chowanoc people were left along the Chowan River. They had been reduced to one settlement across the river in Gates County on Bennett Creek.

The Chowanoc maintained a large population through 1650. Some time in the 1650s, Englishman Nathaniel Batts brought a large group of Natives (from differing tribes) to Francis and Sarah Yeardley's home at Lynnhaven, Virginia. Likely in the party was Chief Kiscutanewh.

More English colonists settled near the Albemarle Sound and signed a peace treaty with the Chowanoc in 1663. However, the tribe breached the peace by entering the Susquehannah War. Several decades later, in 1644 and the Chowanoc War of 1675 to 1677, the Chowanoc had regained sufficient strength to wage two wars against English settlers. They met defeat each time.

After these wars, in 1677 the settlers forced the Chowanoc to cede most of their territory and move to an Indian reservation on Bennett's Creek. It consisted of 11,360 acres.

Infectious diseases transmitted by contact with European explorers and colonists, such as measles and smallpox, likely caused high fatalities and considerably weakened the Chowanoc, as took place with other coastal Carolina Algonquian peoples. None had natural immunity to such new diseases, which had been endemic among Europeans for centuries.

=== 18th century ===
By 1701, their population had been reduced to a single village, located on the Bennetts Creek.

The Chowanocs fought with the English against the Tuscarora in the Tuscarora War from 1711 to 1713. They were devastated, and English people had encroached upon their lands by 1718. Around 1723, the surviving Chowanoc and Tuscorara shared a 53,000-acre reservation, located on Bennetts and Catherine creeks. Their population declined, and survivors merged into the Tuscarora by 1733. In 1775, James Adair noted ‘Chowan’ as a language still spoken within communities comprising the Catawba Nation in South Carolina.

=== 19th century ===
Historian Joseph Norman Heard wrote, "They were extinct by 1820."

== Heritage group ==
In the early 21st century, people who claimed Chowanoc ancestry in the Bennett's Creek area formed an organization called the Chowanoke Indian Nation. Although they use nation in their name, the group is neither federally recognized nor state-recognized as a Native American tribe. Delois Chavis of Winton has been a leader of this organization, which purchased 146 acres of land in Gates County.
