= Weetock =

Extinct Native American tribe in North Carolina

Total population
- extinct as a tribe adopted into the Tuscaroras

Regions with significant populations
- North Carolina

Languages
- unclassified

Religion
- Native American

Related ethnic groups
- Tuscarora, Cothechney, Pamlico, Coree, and Neusiok

The Weetock were an Algonquin related people, native to what is today, North Carolina. They inhabited the coastal plain of present-day eastern North Carolina during the late 17th Century and early 18th Century.

== History ==
=== Early contact ===
In the late seventeenth century, English colonists established plantations and trading posts along the Neuse River and Pamlico River, this caused Native communities to lose hunting grounds and agricultural land, putting pressure on the Weetock.

=== Tuscarora War ===
The Weetock sided with the southern Tuscarora under Chief Hancock during the Tuscarora War, and lost the war alongside him. The tribe was presumably absorbed by the Tuscarora people.
