= Cothechney =

Extinct Native American tribe in North Carolina

Total population
- extinct as a tribe adopted into the Tuscaroras

Regions with significant populations
- North Carolina

Languages
- unclassified

Religion
- Native American

Related ethnic groups
- Tuscarora, Weetock, Pamlico, Coree, and Neusiok

The Cothechney (also spelled Cotachney, Cotechney, and Cotchney) were an Algonquin related people, native to what is today, North Carolina. They inhabited the coastal plain of present-day eastern North Carolina during the late 17th century and early 18th century.

== History ==
=== Early contact ===
During the late seventeenth century, English colonists established plantations and trading posts along the Neuse River and Pamlico River, this caused Native communities to lose hunting grounds and agricultural land. This encroachment on Native land led to conflicts which eventually culminated with the Tuscarora War.

=== Tuscarora War ===
In 1711, the Tuscarora under Chief Hancock launched coordinated attacks on English holdings throughout North Carolina. Among the participants who aided them were the Cothechney. They lost the war along with the Tuscarora and were presumably absorbed into their population.
