= Coree War =

British colonial conflict in North Carolina

- Part of the American Indian Wars
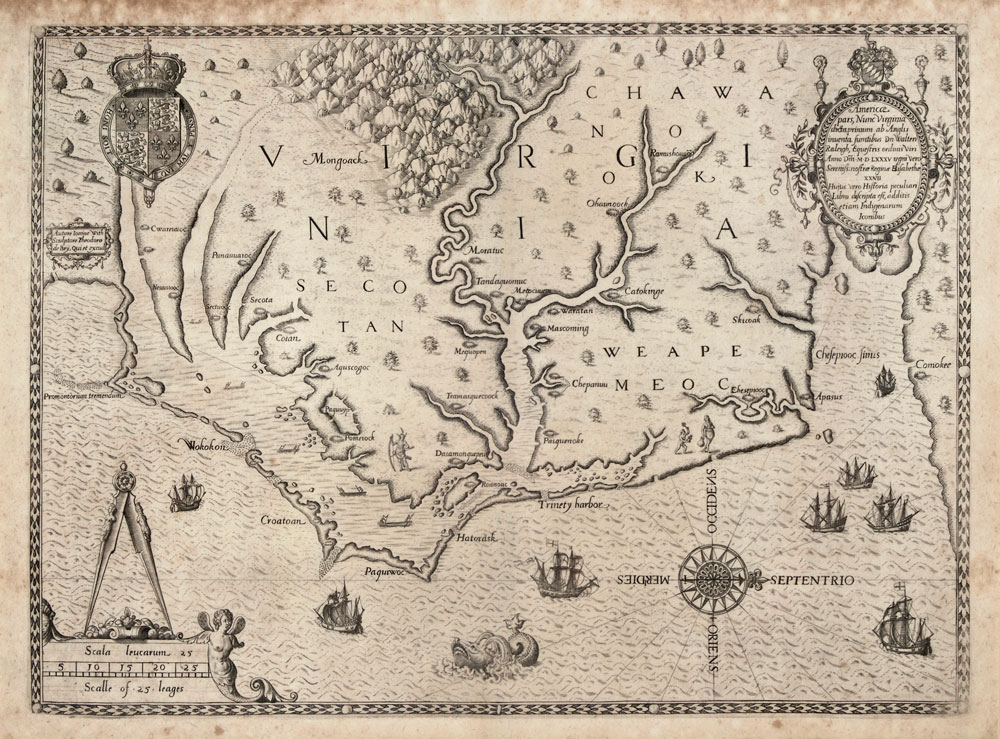
- 1585 map by Theodor de Bry with Cwareuuoc village in top left corner along Neuse River
| Date | 1690s - 1715 |
| Location | Eastern North Carolina |
| Result | Coree population reduced, made to ally with the Tuscarora in the ongoing Tuscarora War |

Belligerents
| North Carolina | Coree; Machapunga; Pamlico |

Commanders and leaders
| Seth Sothel; Philip Ludwell; John Archdale | |

The Coree War was a series of conflicts between the colonists of North Carolina and the natives of the Coree tribe during the late seventeenth century and early eighteenth century.

== Background ==
The Coree inhabited the coastal areas of what is today Eastern North Carolina, mostly what is now Carteret County and Craven County. During the late 1600s, the Coree population had been greatly diminished due to disease, tribal conflict, and pressure from neighboring groups. Further colonial expansion in the Albemarle Sound and Pamlico Sound areas further destabilized the Coree, leading to eventual conflict.

== Conflict ==
By the 1690s, the Coree were fragmented. What we do know of them suggest they had internal divisions and shifting alliances with outside tribes that made a unified force impossible. Because of this there was no organized military campaign, only skirmishes and raids.

By the time of the early 1700s, the remaining Coree were forced to relocate near the lower Neuse River region. During the Tuscarora War, the Coree were described as minor allies who opposed the English settlers. This coalition led to the tribes becoming closer and eventually led to the Coree becoming part of the Tuscarora people.

== Legacy ==
The conflict led to the collapse of the Coree as an independent tribe and forced them to become part of another tribe, a story that played out with many other tribes across North America during the colonial period.
