= Chief Tom Blount =

Tuscarora chief

Tom Blount (c. 1675 – c. 1731) was a Tuscarora chief best known for his role in the Tuscarora War. During the conflict, he allied with the British colonies of North Carolina and South Carolina. He and his allies in the northern band of the Tuscarora fought alongside British colonists against the southern band after Blount was promised full control over the Tuscarora and a permanent alliance with the British if they did so. In 1712, Blount was able to capture southern Tuscarora chief Hancock, who was executed by the colonists. This would ultimately lead to the demise of the southern Tuscarora. In 1713, Blount's band had all but secured victory. Members of the southern band began to move north to New York and joined the Haudenosaunee or Iroquois League. There would still be small skirmishes and raids until 1715.

== Early life ==
Blount was born in 1675 and grew up in the Upper Towns located near the Tar and Roanoke Rivers. His name matches the names of two prominent Englishmen in the area. There are disputes about how Blount got his name. One main theory is that he was adopted by an Englishman and was given the name. Another theory is that he was the illegitimate son of an Englishman and a native woman.

During his childhood, Virginia traders routinely visited the area. Through interaction over the years, Chief Tom Blount developed a speaking knowledge of English. This would help him after his rise to power. Blount lived in a matrilineal society and came to chiefdom through his mother's side of the family. Due to the contact he experienced early in life and his ability to speak the language, Blount allied himself and his people with the English settlers in North Carolina.

== Tuscarora War ==
By 1711, many Tuscarora groups were dealing with increasing encroachment from European settlers. The settlers continually raided Tuscarora villages and kidnapped people to sell as slaves. Additionally, the settlers often took advantage of the tribes in trade and did not honor many treaties that had been signed. The southern band of Tuscarora experienced more of this than the northern band as Chief Tom Blount had a good relationship with the English and lived mostly in peace.

Chief Hancock of the southern band decided to fight back. Although Hancock persuaded the smaller tribes around the region to ally with him, Chief Tom Blount and his people remained neutral in the beginning of the war. On September 22, 1711, Chief Hancock and his smaller tribe allies attacked settlers around the Neuse, Trent and Pamlico Rivers. This began the Tuscarora War. The allied native forces killed hundreds of settlers, including several key political figures. This attack led to Governor Edward Hyde raising a militia of North Carolina and South Carolina settlers.

In 1712, the Colonial Militia of Carolina along with Chief Blount's forces attacked the southern Tuscarora at Fort Narhontes on the banks of the Neuse River. Chief Tom Blount was offered full leadership of the Tuscarora by Governor Hyde if he helped defeat Chief Hancock. During the battle, the southern Tuscarora were massacred. More than 300 were killed with another 100 captured and sold into slavery. Chief Blount also captured Chief Hancock, who was then tried and executed by the English.

In 1713, the southern Tuscarora were defeated again at Fort Neoheroka. In this battle, around 900 were killed or captured and sold as slaves. At this point, Blount and the Carolina militia had all but won the war. However, small skirmishes and raids continued until 1715.

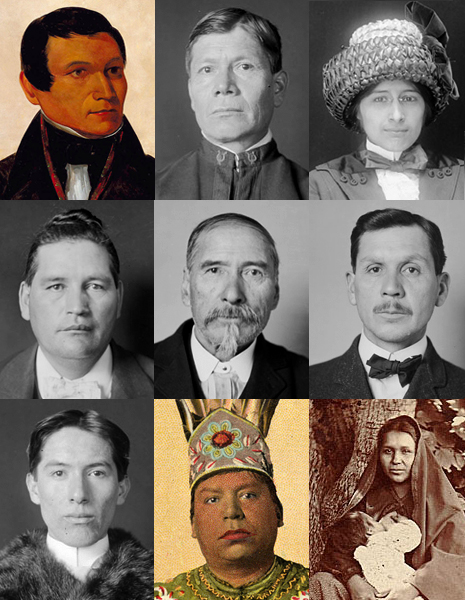
A collage of Tuscarora Native Americans

== After the War/Historical Significance ==
The Tuscarora that survived the war were forced to seek refuge elsewhere. Around 250 moved northward to New York and joined the Haudenosaunee Confederacy. Another 3,500 scattered across North Carolina, seeking refuge. About 1,000 stayed put and submitted to Chief Blount. The ending of the war signaled almost certain demise of the southern Tuscarora. Chief Tom Blount, as promised, took full leadership of the Tuscarora left in the area for his faithfulness and good service. Blount was treated as an absolute monarch by the settlers. With all of the disruption from the war, the Tuscarora were now vulnerable to attack from other tribes. The English agreed to allow the Tuscarora to move back to their old hunting grounds for safety.

== Later life ==
Chief Tom Blount lived the rest of his life as the "King of the Tuscarora". Blount and the English in North Carolina worked together and lived peacefully. The few acts of misconduct by Blount's people were taken directly to him and were taken care of. North Carolina and the Tuscarora allied with each other against each other's enemies. As the years went by, Blount saw his nation grow weaker. Many of his people left to join other tribes or went to work for settlers. By 1731, he ruled around 600 people total. Eventually, the settlers' greedy habits came back. They began to encroach again on native lands. Chief Blount died in 1731, after watching his power slowly dwindle away.

== Bibliography ==
- https://www.ncpedia.org/biography/blunt-tom
- https://tuscaroranationnc.com/tribal-history
- https://www.ncdcr.gov/blog/2013/09/22/culture-clash-led-to-tuscarora-war
- http://northcarolinahistory.org/encyclopedia/tuscarora-war/
