= Samuel Haberstich =

Swiss poet and story writer

Samuel Haberstich (born in Ried, near Schlosswyl, 21 October 1821; died in Bern, 20 February 1872) was a Swiss poet and story writer, known mostly by his pseudonym, Arthur Bitter. He wrote novelettes, stories and poems for many years, all characterized by sympathy of tone and inoffensive realism, Tales, Romances and Poems (German: Erzählungen, Novellen und Gedichte, 4 vols., 1865–66) being the most pleasing.
