= Chowanoc War =

1675–1677 war in British America

- Part of the American Indian Wars
Date	1676–1677
Location	Albemarle County, Province of Carolina, English America
Result	Colonial victory

Belligerents
Chowanoc people Meherrin people Susquehannock people	Albemarle County colony, Province of Carolina Rebel Vigilantes, Bacon's Rebellion

Commanders and leaders
	Peter Jenkins Thomas Miller

The Chowanoc War from 1676 to 1677 was between the Albemarle County colony army (a part of English America's Province of Carolina), and the Chowanoc Native American tribe. For two years, the Chowanoc fought with the forces of Peter Jenkins, commander of the colony's army. In the summer of 1677, acting governor Thomas Miller organized a militia, and the Chowanoc were forcibly moved to modern-day Gates County. This war is seen as an extension of violence from Bacon's Rebellion in Virginia and a catalyst responsible for the opening of Culpepper's Rebellion in North Carolina. Due to multiple native groups involved and fought in the periphery of two major rebellions, the war is also known as the Chowan River War.

== Background ==
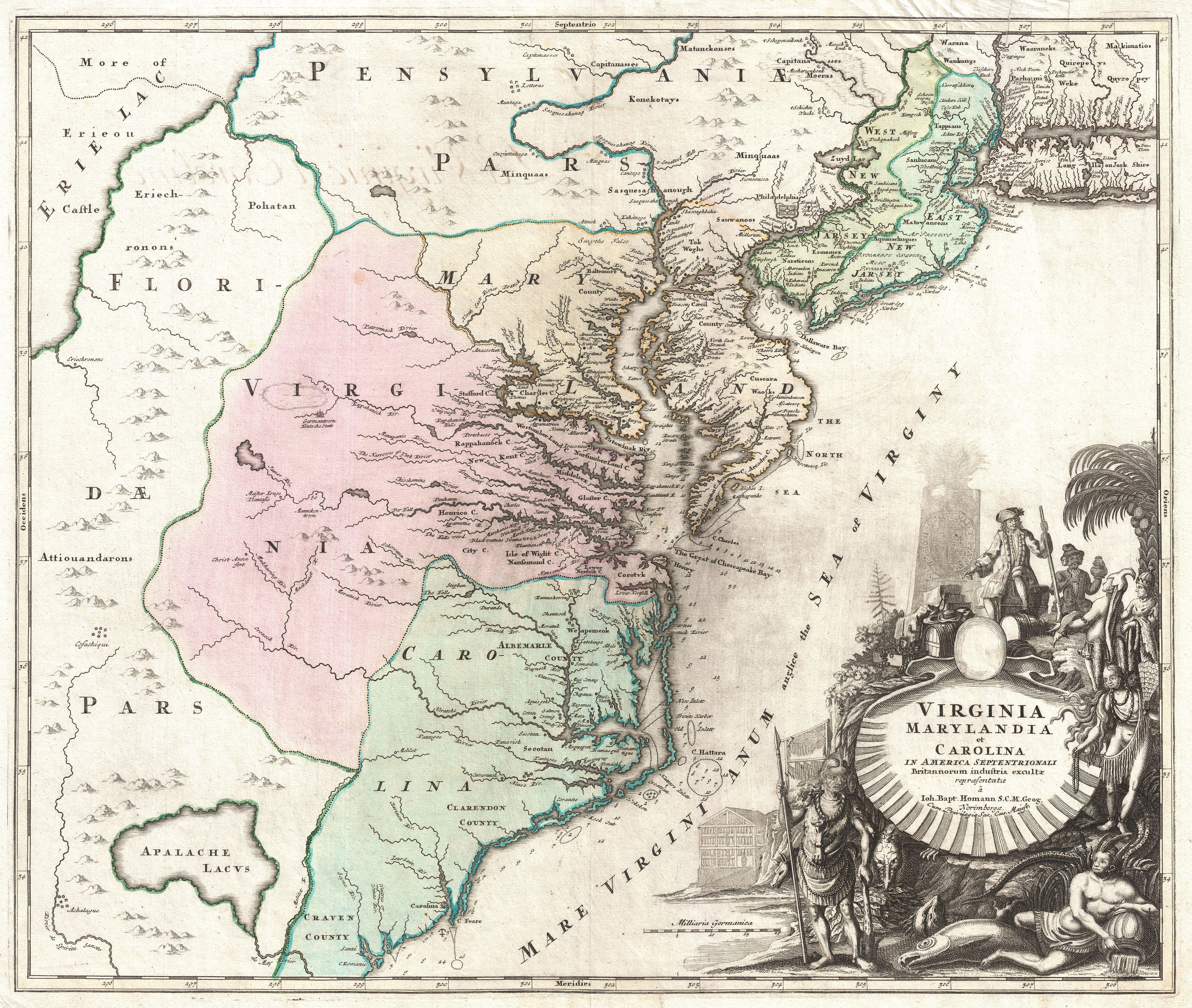
1715 map which depicts Ablemarle County

In 1662, the first permanent English settlers occupied the area north of Albemarle County, which became a part of the Province of Carolina. The Chowanoc Native Americans were living in northern Albemarle County, on their ancestral home on the Meherrin River and Chowan Rivers; in the county, the Chowanoc, Pasquotank, Poteskeet, and Yeopim had a combined population of 200. The population was strong enough to have turned the English settlers away, but the two groups made a peace treaty in 1663. In 1670, Peter Jenkins was promoted lieutenant colonel of the Albemarle colony's army.

By 1676 in Virginia, Bacon's Rebellion had broken out, in which a vigilante militia under the command of Nathaniel Bacon attacked local Native Americans in reprisal for attacks by the northern Susquehannock nation. A refugee group of Susquehannock and Meherrin fled to North Carolina, taking refuge with the Chowanoc at their principal town of Katoking in modern-day Gates County.

Meanwhile, Bacon's Rebellion continued to be fought in Virginia, and counterattacks by government forces caused some of Bacon's rebels to flee down the Chowan River to North Carolina, coming into contact with the Chowanoc, Meherrin and Susquehannock. The English colonists would not "suffer them [the Meherrin] to live there," and hostilities broke out late in 1676. The English in Albemarle County hadn't experienced violence since possibly 1666.

== Course of the war ==
In 1676, the Chowanoc attacked the English, disregarding the 1663 treaty.The English forces were commanded by Peter Jenkins, but a lack of ammunition and organization prevented an effective response. Both sides suffered heavy losses. The settlers lived in their "isolated homesteads" in constant fear of attack, which made settler travel in the area difficult. George Durant, a local settler, began a voyage to New England to purchase firearms "for defense against ye heathen," but would not return until the following year.

In the summer of 1677, the Lord's Proprietors of the colony sent Thomas Eastchurch to Carolina to the colony with a commission appointing him as the new governor, with Thomas Miller as customs collector. Eastchurch was delayed and sent Miller ahead as acting governor in his stead. Miller, though intensely unpopular, organized a militia, possibly with the help of fugitive rebels from Virginia, to march against Katoking. According to one source, "open war was made by Gods assistance though not without the loss of many men," but a conflicting source claimed that the battle was won "without ye least dropp of bloodshed." In either case, the Chowanoc, Meherrin and Susquehannock were "wholly subdued," which was a "crushing defeat" for the Chowanoc. The Meherrin and Susquehannock were driven away, and the Chowanoc were forced to give up the rest of their lands on the Meherrin River and confined to a reservation on Bennett's Creek at the site of their town of Katoking, in modern-day Gates County.

== Aftermath ==
Thomas Durant, who had the year before sailed for New England to procure firearms, returned after Miller's expedition against the Chowanoc with a small arsenal. Local settlers under the leadership of John Culpepper then used these firearms to surprise and arrest Thomas Miller, instigating Culpepper's Rebellion.

The Chowanoc people at Katoking continued on the reservation called Chowan Town, providing assistance to North Carolina in the Tuscarora War and later during the Revolutionary War. In 1790, North Carolina purchased the last 300 acres of the reservation. However, an adjoining tract of land known as Indian Town continued to be privately held in common by tribal members until 1821.

== Works cited ==
- Powell, William S. (1988). Dictionary of North Carolina Biography: H-K Volume 3, University of North Carolina Press. ISBN 978-0-807-81806-0.
- Johnson, Frank Roy (1972). The Algonquians: Indians of that Part of the New World First Visited by the English, University of Wisconsin-Madison. ISBN 978-0-930-23001-2.
- Lee, E. Lawrence (1963). Indian Wars in North Carolina, 1663–1763, North Carolina Office of Archives and History. ISBN 978-0-865-26084-9.
- Ward, H. Trawick; Davis Jr., R. P. Stephen (2018). Time Before History: The Archaeology of North Carolina, University of North Carolina Press. ISBN 978-1-469-64777-7.
- Adams, Lars C. (2013). "Sundry Murders and Depredations": A Closer Look at the Chowan River War, 1676-1677, The North Carolina Historical Review Vol. XC No. 2. ISSN 0029-2494.
