= Worb Castle =

Castle in Worb, Switzerland

- Schloss Worb
- Worb
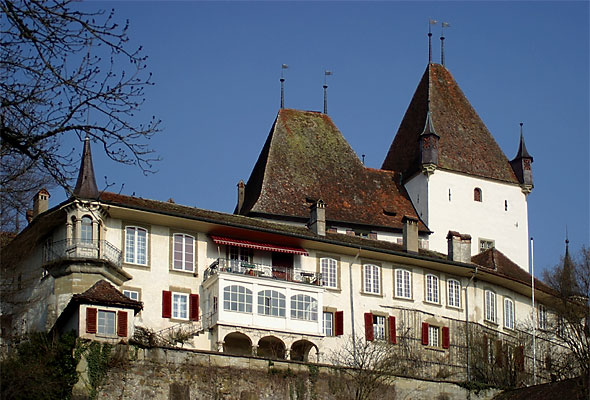
- Worb Castle

Location
- Location within Switzerland
- Coordinates: 46.931363°N 7.567573°E

Site history
- Built: Before 1130
- Built by: The Freiherr de Worvo

Worb Castle is a castle in the municipality of Worb of the Canton of Bern in Switzerland. It is a Swiss heritage site of national significance.

== History ==
The Freiherr de Worvo was first mentioned in 1127, a couple of years before the village appeared in the record. By the second half of the 13th century the Freiherr von Kien had inherited village, lands and Worb Castle. The family ruled over the Worb Herrschaft until 1336 when they became citizens of Bern and the territory came under Bernese authority. Over the following centuries several Bernese noble families ruled over the land and divided and recombined the Herrschaft.

The core of Worb Castle was built before 1130. Initially it had a keep, great hall and a knight's house. In 1469 and again in 1594 it was renovated and repaired. In 1643 a new residential wing was added to the castle. A new ornate manor house was built near the old castle in 1734 by the son of Christoph von Graffenried, Franz Ludwig von Graffenried. This new estate was known as Neuworb but was also called the Neuschloss or New Castle. The two estates were acquired by the Goumoëns-Sinner family in 1846. In 1964 the Seelhofer family bought the old castle while the New Castle was bought in 1985 by the von Graffenried family.

== See also ==
- List of castles in Switzerland
