= Worb =

- Municipality
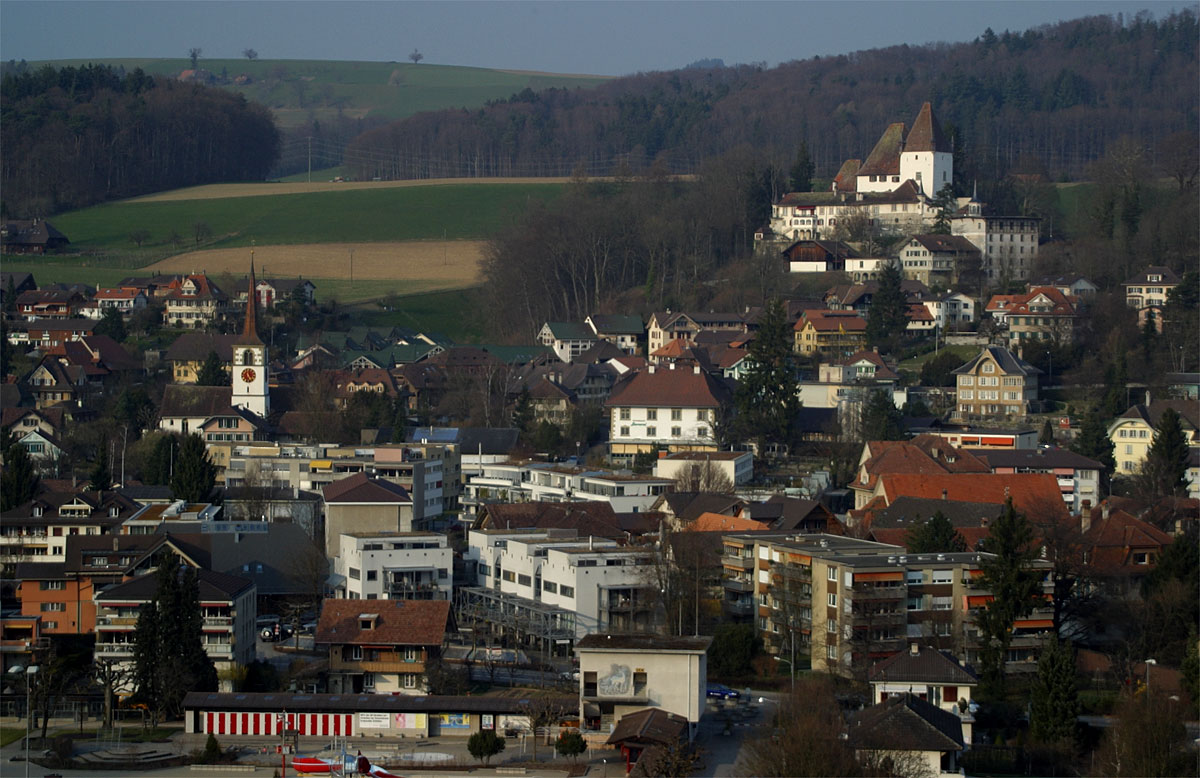

- Flag Coat of arms
- Location of Worb
- Location within Switzerland Location within Canton of Bern
- Coordinates: 46°56′N 7°34′E
- Country: Switzerland
- Canton: Bern
- District: Bern-Mittelland

Government
  - Executive: Gemeinderat with 7 members
  - Mayor: Gemeindepräsident; Niklaus Gfeller
  - Parliament: Grosser Gemeinderat with 40 members

Area
  - Total: 21.084 km^{2} (8.141 sq mi)
- Elevation: 585 m (1,919 ft)

Population (December 2020)
  - Total: 11,621
  - Density: 551.18/km^{2} (1,427.5/sq mi)
- Time zone: UTC+01:00 (CET)
  - Summer (DST): UTC+02:00 (CEST)
- Postal code: 3076
- SFOS number: 627
- ISO 3166 code: CH-BE
- Surrounded by: Allmendingen, Biglen, Muri bei Bern, Rubigen, Schlosswil, Trimstein, Vechigen, Walkringen
- Twin towns: Edelény (Hungary)
- Website: www.worb.ch

Worb is a municipality in the Bern-Mittelland administrative district in the canton of Bern in Switzerland.

== History ==
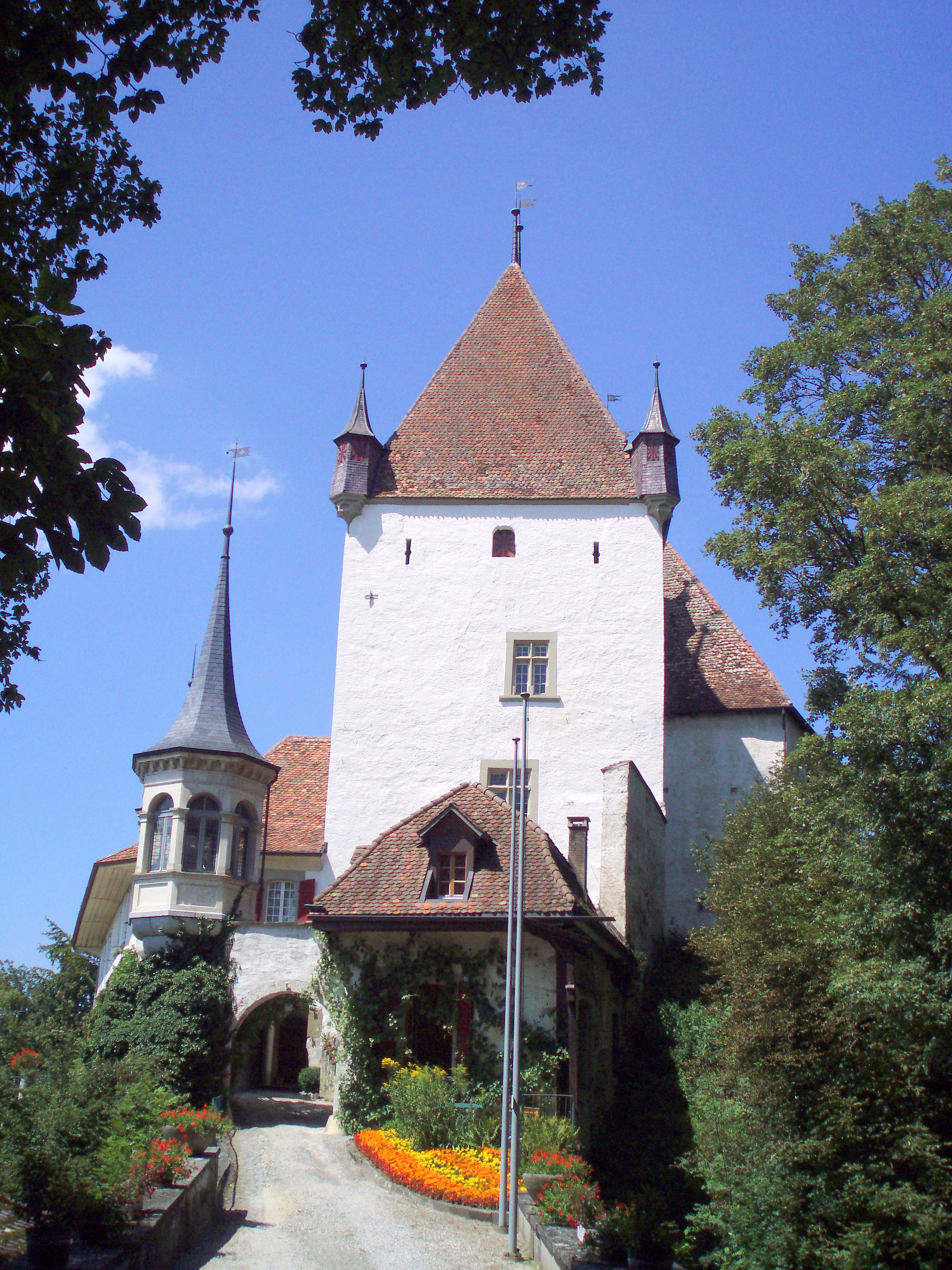
Worb Castle

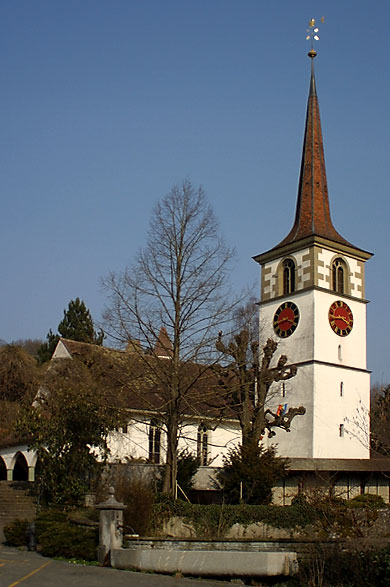
Worb's historic Reformed Church

Aerial view from 500 m by Walter Mittelholzer (1925)

Worb is first mentioned around 1130-46 as Worw.

The oldest traces of settlements in the area include scattered neolithic artifacts, Hallstatt grave mounds in the Buchliwald and a La Tene cemetery at Rohrmoos-Stockeren. Other prehistoric graves have been found in the Gschneitwald. A Roman estate from the 2nd and 3rd centuries and a Roman grave have also been discovered. During the Early Middle Ages there was a small settlement that had a cemetery at Vielbringen.

The Freiherr de Worvo was first mentioned in 1127, a couple of years before the village appeared in the record. By the second half of the 13th century the Freiherr von Kien had inherited village, lands and Worb Castle. The family ruled over the Worb Herrschaft until 1336 when they became citizens of Bern and the territory came under Bernese authority. Over the following centuries several Bernese noble families ruled over the land and divided and recombined the Herrschaft. The lord over the village and Herrschaft held the Zwing und Bann and low court rights. The high court was in Konolfingen. In 1469 a fight broke out between the Bernese appointed court representative and the bailiff of Worb. It took two years for the rights and jurisdiction of both positions to be settled.

The core of Worb Castle was built before 1130. Initially it had a keep, great hall and a knight's house. In 1469 and again in 1594 it was renovated and repaired. In 1643 a new residential wing was added to the castle. A new ornate manor house was built near the old castle in 1734 by the son of Christoph von Graffenried, Franz Ludwig von Graffenried. This new estate was known as Neuworb but was also called the Neuschloss or New Castle. The two estates were acquired by the Goumoëns-Sinner family in 1846. In 1964 the Seelhofer family bought the old castle while the New Castle was bought in 1985 by the von Graffenried family. Another country estate was built in 1730 in the village of Richigen for the Stettler family. Later Richigen Manor passed from the Stettlers to the von Wattenwyl family and then to the Dollfus von Volckersberg family.

The first village church was probably a wooden structure built during the Early Middle Ages. The wooden building was probably replaced with a stone one at a later date. In the 11th century the Church of Saint Maurice was built above the early medieval tombs of the earlier churches. The church bell tower was built some time after 1430. In the third quarter of the 15th century murals were painted on the walls. The current choir and choir windows were added to the building in 1520–21. After Worb adopted the Protestant Reformation in 1528, the church converted to the new faith and the old parish of Worb was divided into four sections. The Reformed church remained the only church in the village until 1953 when the Catholic church of St. Martin was built in Worb. It was rebuilt in 1998 to its current appearance.

While farming was generally important in Worb, in 1380 the Freiherr of Kien diverted the Biglenbach stream from Walkringen to Worb. They built a mill along the stream and over the following centuries forges, sawmills, grain mills, dyers, taverns and inns developed in the village. In 1804 a hammer mill was built along the Biglenbach and industry began to develop in Worb. After 1900 there were numerous factories built along the stream and in the village.

The first railroad station of the Bern-Lucerne railroad opened in 1859 on the outskirts of the municipality. This remained the only railroad station until 1898 then the Bern-Worb railroad entered the center of the village. The Worblentalbahn line was built in 1913 and connected Worb with the neighboring municipalities. The two rail lines merged in 1927 and provided an efficient link between Worb and its neighbors. The rail lines combined with excellent roads have allowed many commuters to settle in Worb. In the later half of the 20th century many of the older factories were replaced with new industries including; industrial electronics, equipment construction, furniture and interior design. In 2012, the main employers in the municipality were various transportation companies, HVAC factories and the timber industry.

The municipality is home to a total of ten schools as of 2012.

== Geography ==
Worb has an area of 21.08 km^{2} (8.14 sq mi). As of 2012, a total of 13.18 km^{2} (5.09 mi^{2}) or 62.5% is used for agricultural purposes, while 4.42 km^{2} (1.71 mi^{2}) or 20.9% is forested. Of the rest of the land, 3.29 km^{2} (1.27 mi^{2}) or 15.6% is settled (buildings or roads), 0.07 km^{2} (17 acres) or 0.3% is either rivers or lakes and 0.04 km^{2} (9.9 acres) or 0.2% is unproductive land.

During the same year, industrial buildings made up 1.2% of the total area while housing and buildings made up 9.3% and transportation infrastructure made up 3.8%. Out of the forested land, all of the forested land area is covered with heavy forests. Of the agricultural land, 46.1% is used for growing crops and 13.8% is pastures, while 2.6% is used for orchards or vine crops. All the water in the municipality is flowing water.

The municipality is located in the upper Worblen valley. It consists of the villages and hamlets of Worb, Rüfenacht, Vielbringen, Enggistein, Richigen, Ried, Wattenwil and Bangerten.

On 31 December 2009 Amtsbezirk Konolfingen, the municipality's former district, was dissolved. On the following day, 1 January 2010, it joined the newly created Verwaltungskreis Bern-Mittelland.

== Coat of arms ==
The blazon of the municipal coat of arms is Or a Chevron reaching the chief Sable.

== Demographics ==
Worb has a population (as of December 2020) of 11,621. As of 2010, 14.0% of the population are resident foreign nationals. Over the last 10 years (2001–2011) the population has changed at a rate of -0.9%. Migration accounted for -1.4%, while births and deaths accounted for 0.1%.

Most of the population (as of 2000) speaks German (9,869 or 90.6%) as their first language, Italian is the second most common (202 or 1.9%) and French is the third (135 or 1.2%). There are 6 people who speak Romansh.

As of 2008, the population was 47.9% male and 52.1% female. The population was made up of 4,622 Swiss men (40.7% of the population) and 824 (7.3%) non-Swiss men. There were 5,150 Swiss women (45.3%) and 768 (6.8%) non-Swiss women. Of the population in the municipality, 2,867 or about 26.3% were born in Worb and lived there in 2000. There were 4,442 or 40.8% who were born in the same canton, while 1,567 or 14.4% were born somewhere else in Switzerland, and 1,441 or 13.2% were born outside of Switzerland.

As of 2011, children and teenagers (0–19 years old) make up 19.3% of the population, while adults (20–64 years old) make up 61.2% and seniors (over 64 years old) make up 19.5%.

As of 2000, there were 4,449 people who were single and never married in the municipality. There were 5,304 married individuals, 568 widows or widowers and 574 individuals who are divorced.

As of 2010, there were 1,694 households that consist of only one person and 253 households with five or more people. In 2000, a total of 4,507 apartments (92.0% of the total) were permanently occupied, while 284 apartments (5.8%) were seasonally occupied and 110 apartments (2.2%) were empty. As of 2010, the construction rate of new housing units was 0.1 new units per 1000 residents. The vacancy rate for the municipality, in 2011, was 0.15%.

The historical population is given in the following chart:

== Heritage sites of national significance ==
Worb Castle also known as the Altes Schloss and the Swiss Reformed church are listed as Swiss heritage site of national significance. The entire hamlet of Wattenwil is part of the Inventory of Swiss Heritage Sites.

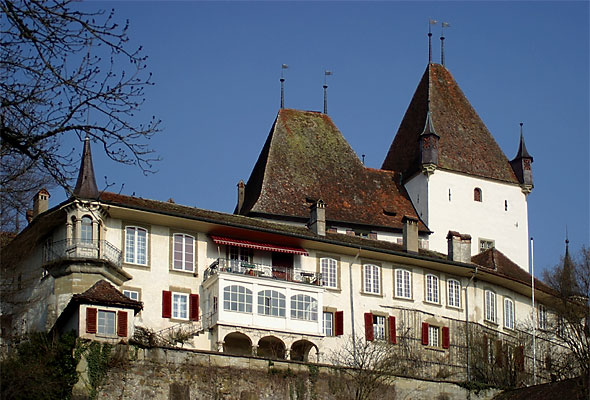
Worb Castle

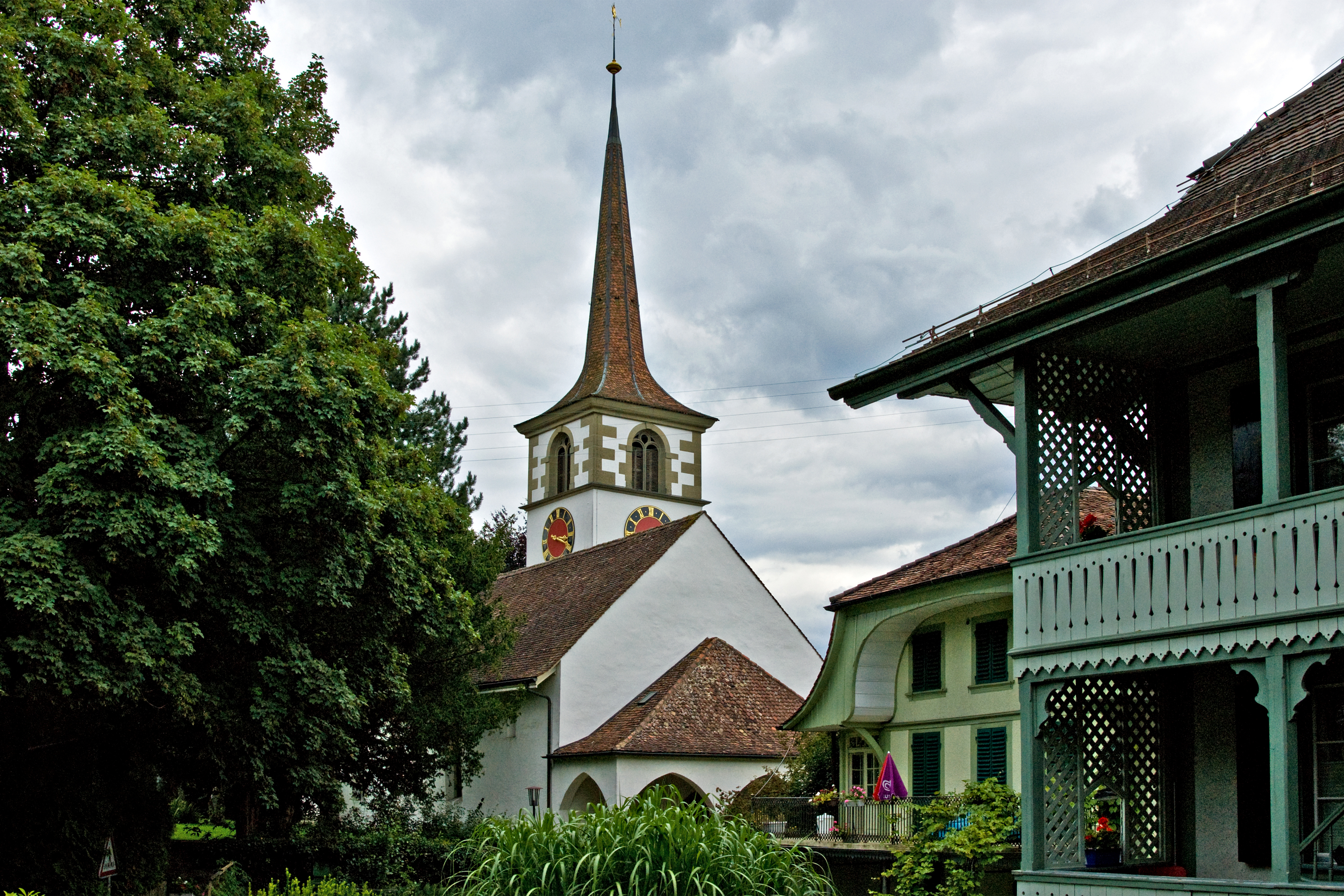
Worb Reformed church

== Politics ==
In the 2011 federal election the most popular party was the Swiss People's Party (SVP) which received 25% of the vote. The next three most popular parties were the Social Democratic Party (SP) (19.4%), the Conservative Democratic Party (BDP) (16.5%) and the FDP.The Liberals (11.3%). In the federal election, a total of 4,286 votes were cast, and the voter turnout was 52.6%.

== Economy ==
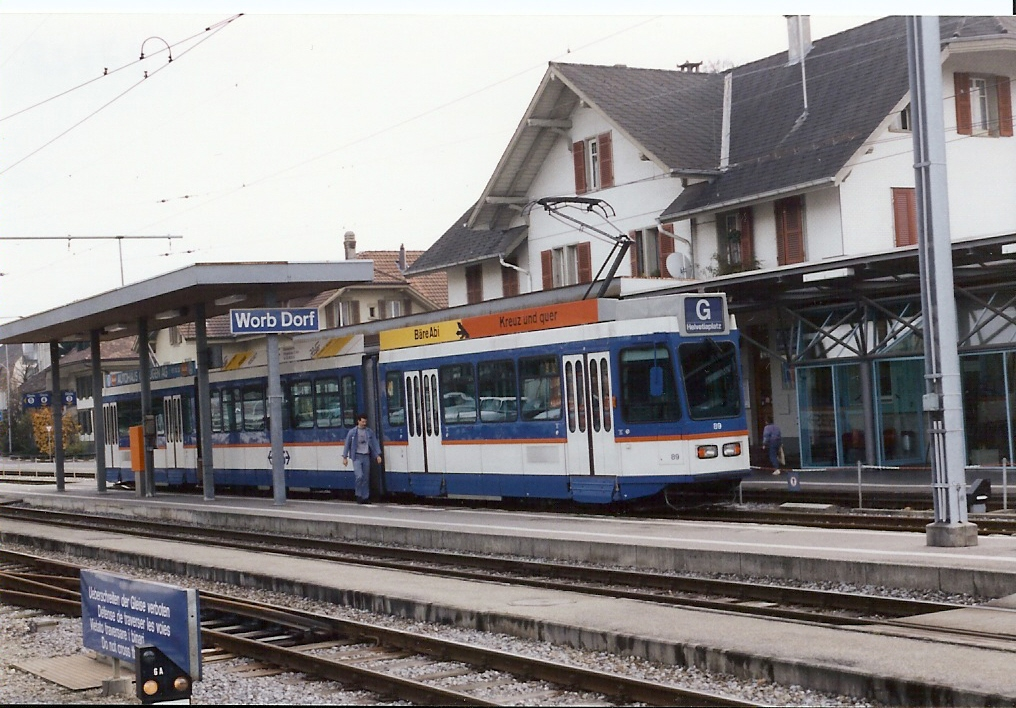
Worb railway station

As of 2011, Worb had an unemployment rate of 2.09%. As of 2008, there were a total of 3,432 people employed in the municipality. Of these, there were 275 people employed in the primary economic sector and about 99 businesses involved in this sector. 933 people were employed in the secondary sector and there were 106 businesses in this sector. 2,224 people were employed in the tertiary sector, with 327 businesses in this sector. There were 6,015 residents of the municipality who were employed in some capacity, of which females made up 44.9% of the workforce.

In 2008 there were a total of 2,714 full-time equivalent jobs. The number of jobs in the primary sector was 187, all of which were in agriculture. The number of jobs in the secondary sector was 853 of which 574 or (67.3%) were in manufacturing and 273 (32.0%) were in construction. The number of jobs in the tertiary sector was 1,674. In the tertiary sector; 586 or 35.0% were in wholesale or retail sales or the repair of motor vehicles, 102 or 6.1% were in the movement and storage of goods, 100 or 6.0% were in a hotel or restaurant, 57 or 3.4% were in the information industry, 62 or 3.7% were the insurance or financial industry, 144 or 8.6% were technical professionals or scientists, 123 or 7.3% were in education and 271 or 16.2% were in health care.

In 2000, there were 1,861 workers who commuted into the municipality and 4,227 workers who commuted away. The municipality is a net exporter of workers, with about 2.3 workers leaving the municipality for every one entering. A total of 1,787 workers (49.0% of the 3,648 total workers in the municipality) both lived and worked in Worb. Of the working population, 30.3% used public transportation to get to work, and 45.7% used a private car.

In 2011 the average local and cantonal tax rate on a married resident of Worb making 150,000 CHF was 12.3%, while an unmarried resident's rate was 18.1%. For comparison, the average rate for the entire canton in 2006 was 13.9% and the nationwide rate was 11.6%. In 2009 there were a total of 5,061 tax payers in the municipality. Of that total, 1,845 made over 75 thousand CHF per year. There were 30 people who made between 15 and 20 thousand per year.

== Religion ==
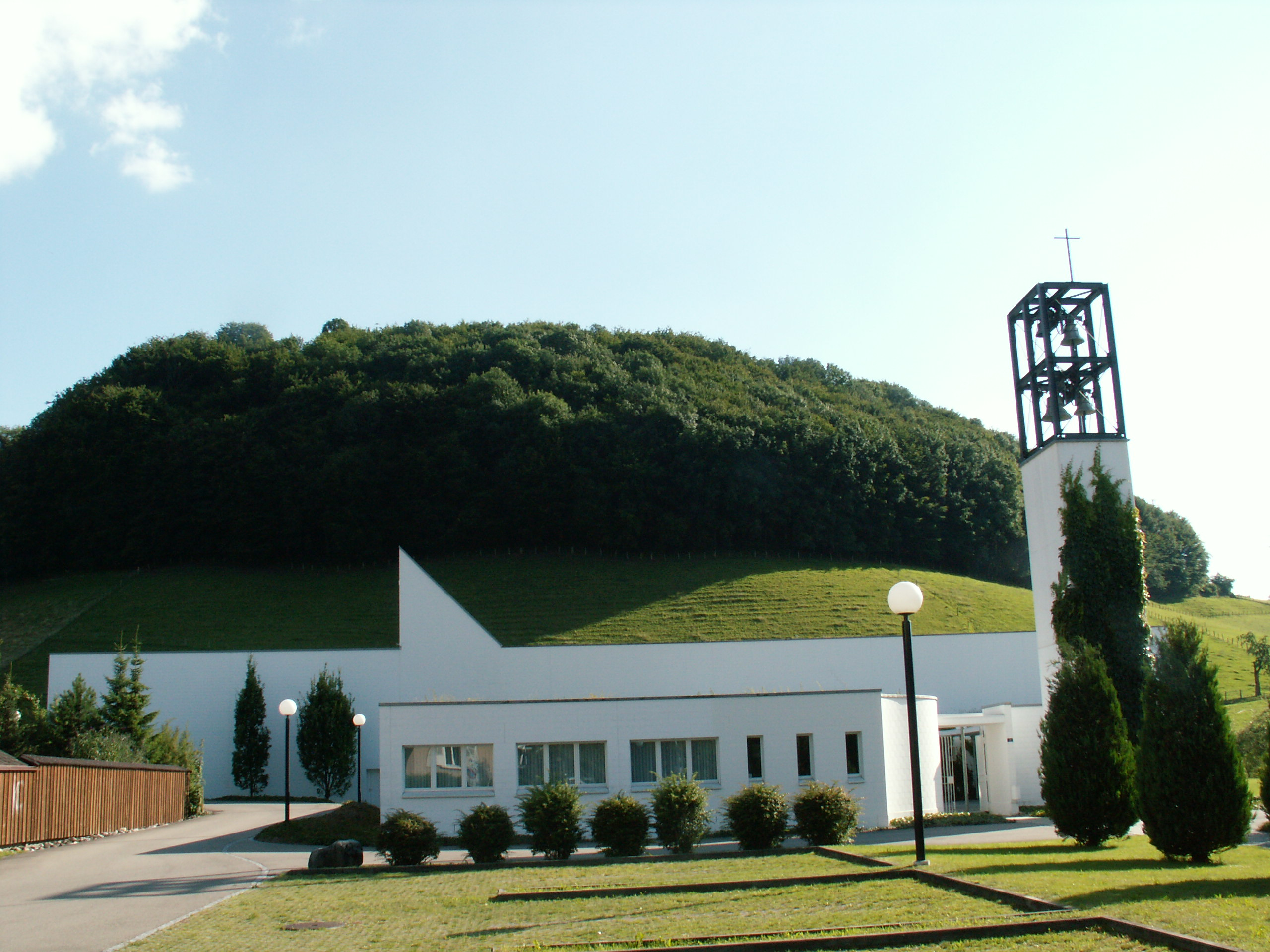
Catholic church of Worb

From the 2000 census, 6,918 or 63.5% belonged to the Swiss Reformed Church, while 1,543 or 14.2% were Roman Catholic. Of the rest of the population, there were 118 members of an Orthodox church (or about 1.08% of the population), there were 13 individuals (or about 0.12% of the population) who belonged to the Christian Catholic Church, and there were 820 individuals (or about 7.53% of the population) who belonged to another Christian church. There were 2 individuals (or about 0.02% of the population) who were Jewish, and 357 (or about 3.28% of the population) who were Islamic. There were 36 individuals who were Buddhist, 92 individuals who were Hindu and 9 individuals who belonged to another church. 700 (or about 6.42% of the population) belonged to no church, are agnostic or atheist, and 679 individuals (or about 6.23% of the population) did not answer the question.

== Education ==
In Worb about 55.5% of the population have completed non-mandatory upper secondary education, and 19.7% have completed additional higher education (either university or a Fachhochschule). Of the 1,424 who had completed some form of tertiary schooling listed in the census, 68.8% were Swiss men, 22.5% were Swiss women, 5.5% were non-Swiss men and 3.2% were non-Swiss women.

The Canton of Bern school system provides one year of non-obligatory Kindergarten, followed by six years of Primary school. This is followed by three years of obligatory lower Secondary school where the students are separated according to ability and aptitude. Following the lower Secondary students may attend additional schooling or they may enter an apprenticeship.

During the 2011–12 school year, there were a total of 1,100 students attending classes in Worb. There were 10 kindergarten classes with a total of 190 students in the municipality. Of the kindergarten students, 23.7% were permanent or temporary residents of Switzerland (not citizens) and 32.1% have a different mother language than the classroom language. The municipality had 32 primary classes and 615 students. Of the primary students, 20.3% were permanent or temporary residents of Switzerland (not citizens) and 30.1% have a different mother language than the classroom language. During the same year, there were 16 lower secondary classes with a total of 261 students. There were 17.2% who were permanent or temporary residents of Switzerland (not citizens) and 29.5% have a different mother language than the classroom language. The remainder of the students attend a private or special school.

As of 2000, there were a total of 1,185 students attending any school in the municipality. Of those, 1,169 both lived and attended school in the municipality while 16 students came from another municipality. During the same year, 387 residents attended schools outside the municipality.

Rüfenacht is home to a private English school which conducts classes in English for students ages 3–12.
