= Fort Neoheroka =

- Neoheroka Fort Site
- U.S. National Register of Historic Places
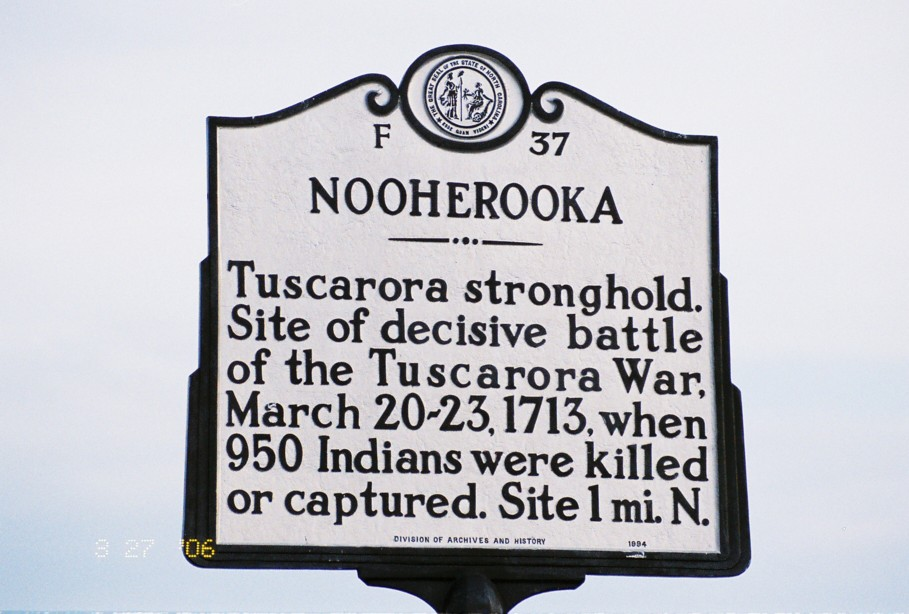
- Fort Neoheroka historical marker near Snow Hill, North Carolina

- Location within North Carolina Location within the United States
- Nearest city: Snow Hill, North Carolina
- Coordinates: 35°28′43″N 77°43′47″W
- Area: 37 acres (15 ha)
- Built: 1713
- NRHP reference No.: 09000529
- Added to NRHP: July 17, 2009

Fort Neoheroka (or just Neoheroka, Tuscarora: Neyuherú·kęˀ), also known as Nooherooka, is the name of a stronghold constructed in what is now Greene County, North Carolina by the Tuscarora tribe during the Tuscarora War of 1711–1715. In March 1713, the fort was besieged and ultimately attacked by a colonial force consisting of an army from the neighboring Province of South Carolina, under the command of Colonel James Moore and made up mainly of Indians including Yamasee, Apalachee, Catawba, and Cherokee. The 1713 siege lasted for more than three weeks, from around March 1 to March 22, 1713. Hundreds of men, women and children were burned to death in a fire that destroyed the fort. Approximately 170 more were killed outside the fort while approximately 400 were taken to South Carolina where they were sold into slavery. The defeat of the Tuscaroras, once the most powerful Indian tribe in the Province of North Carolina, opened up North Carolina's interior to further settlement. The supremacy of the Tuscaroras in the colony was broken forever, and most moved north to live among the Haudenosaunee. On July 17, 2009, the Fort Neoheroka Site was added to the National Register of Historic Places.

== See also ==
- Colonial history of the United States
- History of North Carolina
- National Register of Historic Places listings in North Carolina
