= Christoph von Graffenried, 1st Baron of Bernberg =

Swiss nobleman and explorer (1661–1743)

- Born: 15 November 1661; Worb Castle, Canton of Bern
- Died: 27 October 1743 (aged 81); Worb Castle, Canton of Bern
- Spouse: Regina Tscharner (m. 1684)
- Parents: Anton von Graffenried (father); Catherine von Graffenried (mother)

Christoph von Graffenried, 1st Baron of Bernberg (15 November 1661 – 27 October 1743) was a Swiss nobleman and explorer who was one of the founders of New Bern, North Carolina. Born in Worb Castle in the Canton of Bern, he played a major role in the colonisation of North America by German and Swiss settlers. In c. 1716, von Graffenried published a memoir entitled Relation of My American Project, which recounted his life in both Switzerland and North America.

== Early life ==
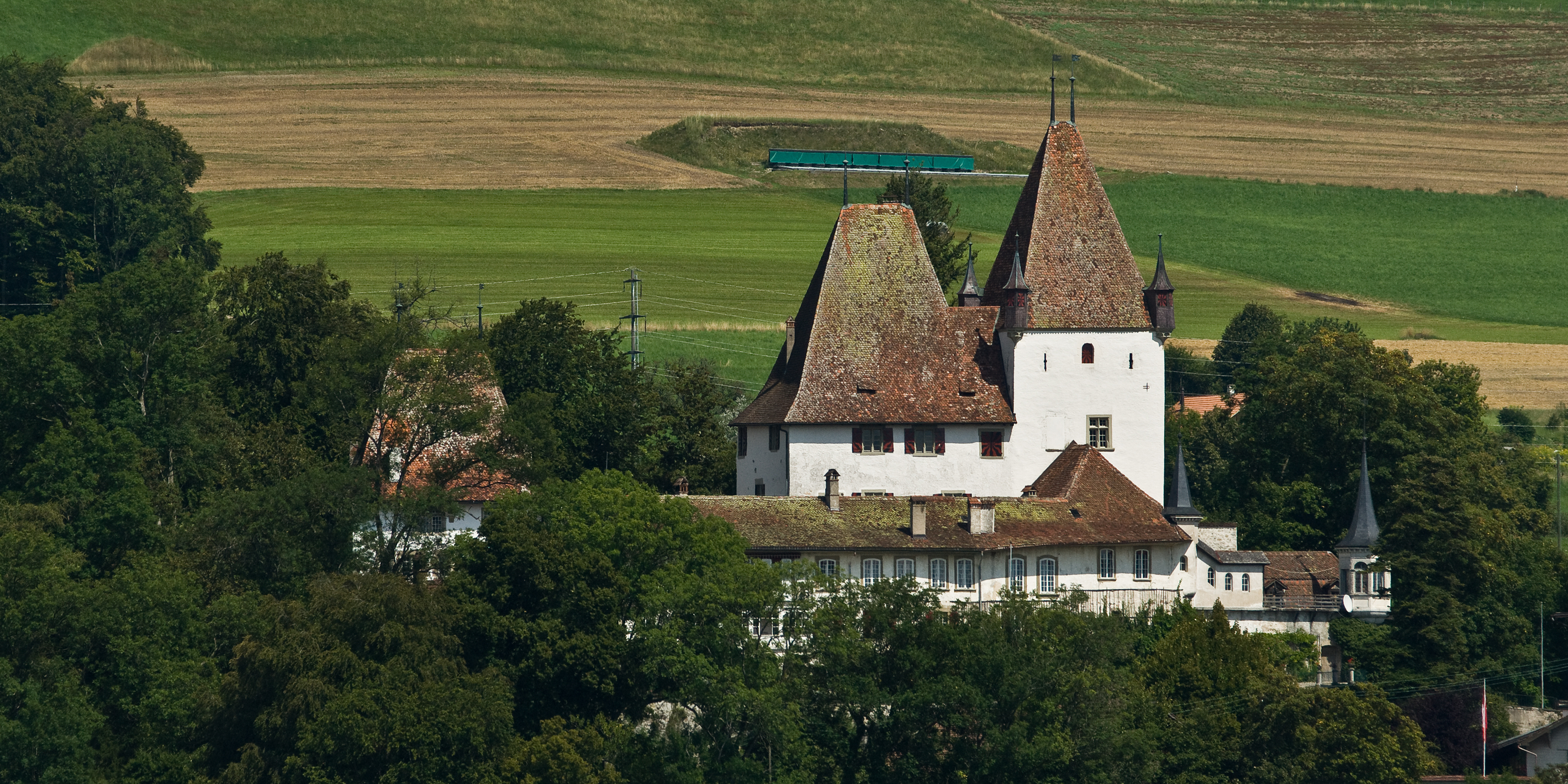
Worb Castle, where von Graffenried was born

Christoph von Graffenried was born on 15 November 1661 in Worb Castle in the Swiss canton of Bern. He was the son of Anton von Graffenried and Catherine Jenner. His father was lord of Worb and a minor government official. Von Graffenried studied at both Heidelberg University and Leiden University before visiting England c. 1680. While in England, he came to know John Colleton and other Lords Proprietors of Carolina. In 1683, he returned home and on 25 April 1684 he married Regina Tscharner, with whom he had thirteen children.

== New Bern colony ==
Von Graffenried's coat of arms

As his family grew, Von Graffenried found that his salary as a local government official and income from his estate were insufficient to cover expenses and growing debts. Around 1708, he became acquainted with the explorer-adventurer Franz Ludwig Michel who persuaded him to join an initiative to mine American silver deposits and establish a colony of Swiss refugees who were either poor or religiously persecuted. In 1709, Von Graffenried met with his former contacts in England and the Lords Proprietors of Carolina granted the Swiss venture 19,000 acres along the Neuse and Trent rivers in Carolina, including 5,000 acres purchased by Von Graffenried himself. As a significant landowner, Von Graffenried was named a "Landgrave of Carolina" and was later granted the provincial title, "Baron of Bernburg." In addition, Queen Anne provided £4,000 to pay for the transportation of 100 German Palatine families that had fled to England to escape the War of the Spanish Succession.

In January 1710, Von Graffenried sent 650 Palatine settlers to Carolina under the leadership of John Lawson, the provincial surveyor general. Lawson had recently returned from Carolina in order to publish his book, A Voyage to Carolina. Lawson was knowledgeable of the country and promised to guide the settlers to the best sites for their communities. Their voyage was hindered by a series of winter storms and it was thirteen weeks before they landed in Virginia and then proceeded overland to Carolina. Hardship and disease took a heavy toll on the group and half of the original 650 colonists died before reaching their destination.

In July, Von Graffenried sailed with a contingent of about 150 Swiss colonists. Their crossing was relatively uneventful and after landing at Hampton, Virginia, in September, he joined Michel and Lawson in the Neuse-Trent area. He quickly laid out a town at the fork of the Trent and Neuse Rivers and christened it New Bern. When a local tribe complained that the land belonged to them, Graffenried negotiated a settlement and purchased the site of the new town from the tribe. The craftsmen in the group were assigned to the town while the farmers were given 250-acre plots in the outlying areas up the Trent River.

Despite a quick start to their settlement, the colonists were in desperate need of food and other supplies. The deputy governor of North Carolina was supposed to provide funds to purchase what was needed but a religious and political dispute between factions in the Carolina government meant that no money was forthcoming. Von Graffenried appealed unsuccessfully to the lords proprietors, other investors, and the colonial legislature for support. In the summer of 1711, an outbreak of yellow fever hit the colony and several settlers died, including two Swiss servants in Von Graffenried's household.

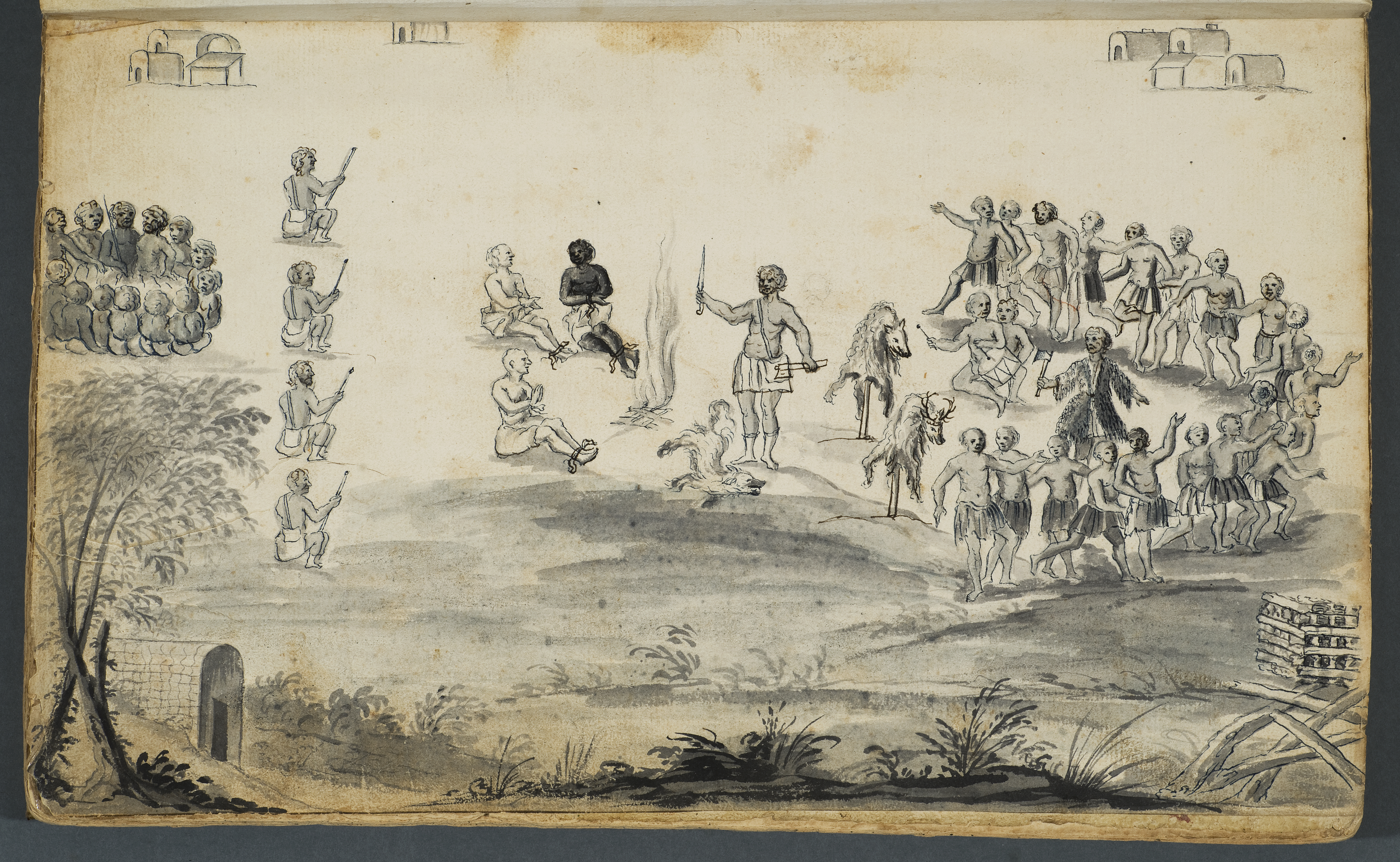
Artist's depiction of the capture and trial of Von Graffenried and John Lawson by Tuscarora Indians in 1711

Meanwhile, relations between colonists and Native Americans in the region continued to deteriorate. The Natives resented the steady encroachment of Europeans on their territory and felt abused in their trading deals with the settlers. Perhaps their greatest grievance was the native slave trade that flourished in the frontier regions—Native children in particular were kidnapped and sold into slavery by white slave traders. Von Graffenried's new colony was not a specific target of this resentment and in later years, Von Graffenried would insist that he treated the Indians justly.

Von Graffenried was apparently unaware of how seriously relations with the Tuscarora had deteriorated. In September 1711, he and John Lawson began an exploratory journey up the Neuse. They hoped the river might provide a route for trade with Virginia. The trip was planned to last about two weeks and they brought along two Black slaves and two Native guides. The route took the group through the heart of Tuscarora territory. The Natives captured Von Graffenried, Lawson, and their Black slaves and subjected Von Graffenried and Lawson to a lengthy series of trials. Eventually, it was decided they were both guilty of crimes against the Tuscarora people and should be killed. Von Graffenried defended himself, saying that he had no part in any quarrels with the Natives and that he was under the protection of the Queen of England who would surely avenge his death. Ultimately, the Tuscarora spared Von Graffenried but killed Lawson. The manner of his death is unknown.

In negotiations with Native tribes on Virginia's border, Lieutenant Governor Alexander Spotswood of Virginia interceded on behalf of Von Graffenried and demanded his release. Von Graffenried was freed after six weeks of captivity. When he finally reached New Bern, he found it abandoned and in flames. On September 22, 1711, while Graffenried was held captive, the Tuscarora and their allies had attacked white settlers in the region. The conflict became known as the Tuscarora War. Sixty Swiss and Palatines in New Bern and the surrounding area were killed and fifteen taken captive. The survivors fled New Bern and sought shelter at a fort built by plantation owner William Brice.

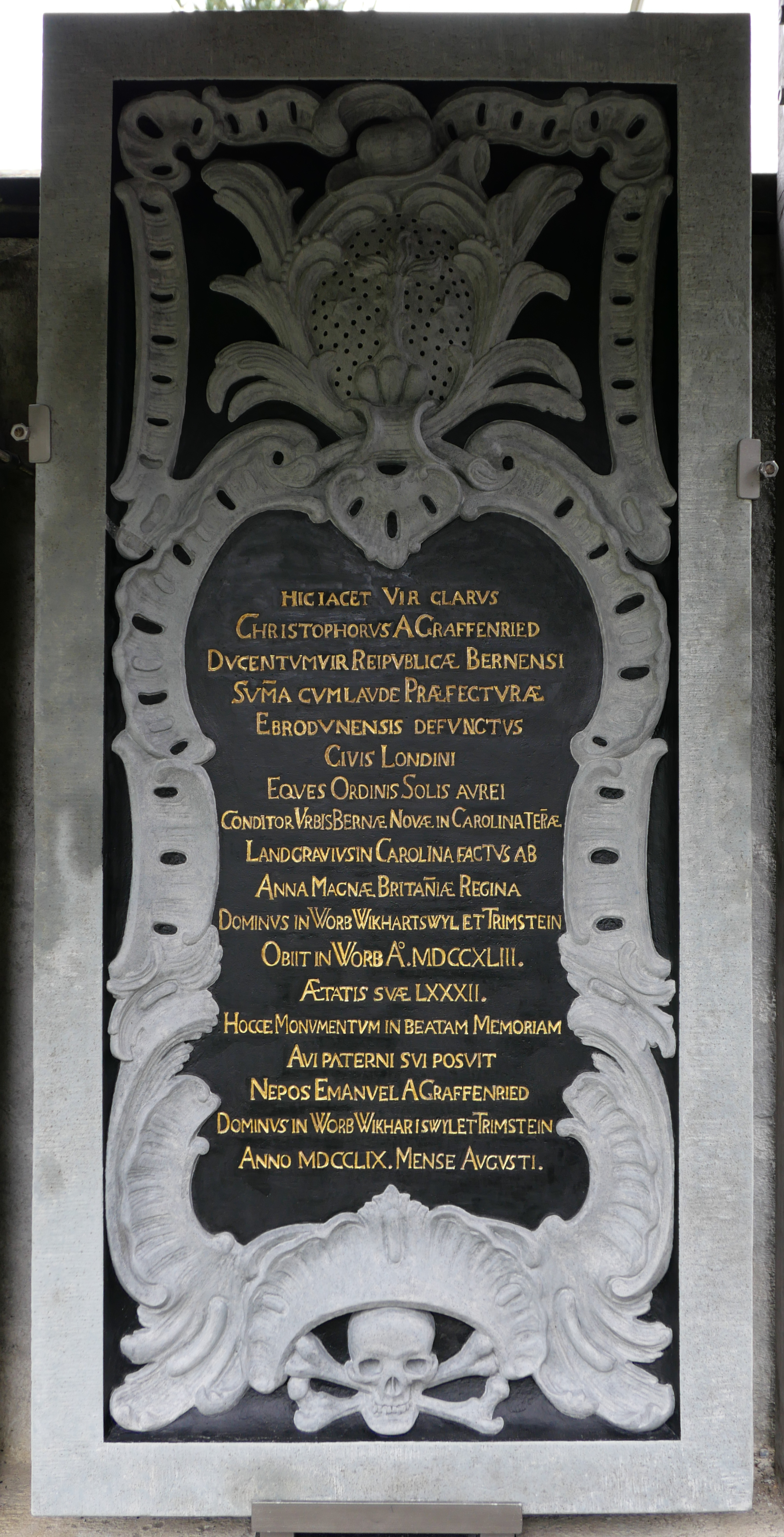
The restored grave slab of von Graffenried, which was discovered in 1983/84 along with 12 other slabs of members of the families von Graffenried and von Diesbach in the nave of the reformed church building of Worb. The former floor slabs have been exhibited on a wall close to the church since then.

The colonists were surprised to see that Graffenried was still alive but they had lost confidence in his leadership and he never regained full authority. His refusal to seek revenge for the Native attacks was met with resentment. Some of the settlers followed him back to New Bern but others remained at the Brice plantation. A dispute over ownership of some blacksmith tools nearly led to open warfare between the factions. The disaffected colonists filed a protest with the colonial government and Graffenried was forced to appear before the assembly to defend his actions.

During the winter of 1711–1712, Graffenried and the remaining loyal settlers barricaded themselves in the town of New Bern and made plans to move their settlement to Virginia. When supplies ran low, Graffenried went to Albemarle County and obtained a shipload of corn, gunpowder and other provisions. Unfortunately, the ship caught fire on the voyage back to New Bern and the supplies were lost. In the spring of 1712, Graffenried traveled to Virginia to scout for a new settlement site around the falls of Potomac. Before leaving, he arranged with Franz Michel to transport any willing colonists to Virginia by ship.

In Virginia, the baron contracted French-Canadian explorer and adventurer, Martin Chartier, to serve as a guide. In addition to locating a suitable site for settlement, Graffenried was anxious to find a source of silver that was rumored to exist in the region. Chartier took him to Sugarloaf Mountain and then to the Shenandoah Valley, where they visited Massanutten Mountain, the supposed site of silver mines which the baron hoped would repair his fortune. However, they found no trace of silver.

When it became apparent that Michel would not be transporting any colonists (he later claimed his ship was not seaworthy), Graffenried decided to return to North Carolina. On his return, he stopped to confer with Governor Edward Hyde just as an epidemic of yellow fever was sweeping the province. The disease hit the governor's household and Graffenried became ill but recovered, while the governor was not so fortunate and died.

Graffenried tried for a while longer to find some way of reviving his colonial venture but his investors had lost faith in him and creditors were threatening to have him arrested and thrown into debtors' prison. On Easter, 1713, he sailed for England, after mortgaging all the company landholdings to Thomas Pollock of Chowan County. He returned to Switzerland in 1714.

== Later life ==
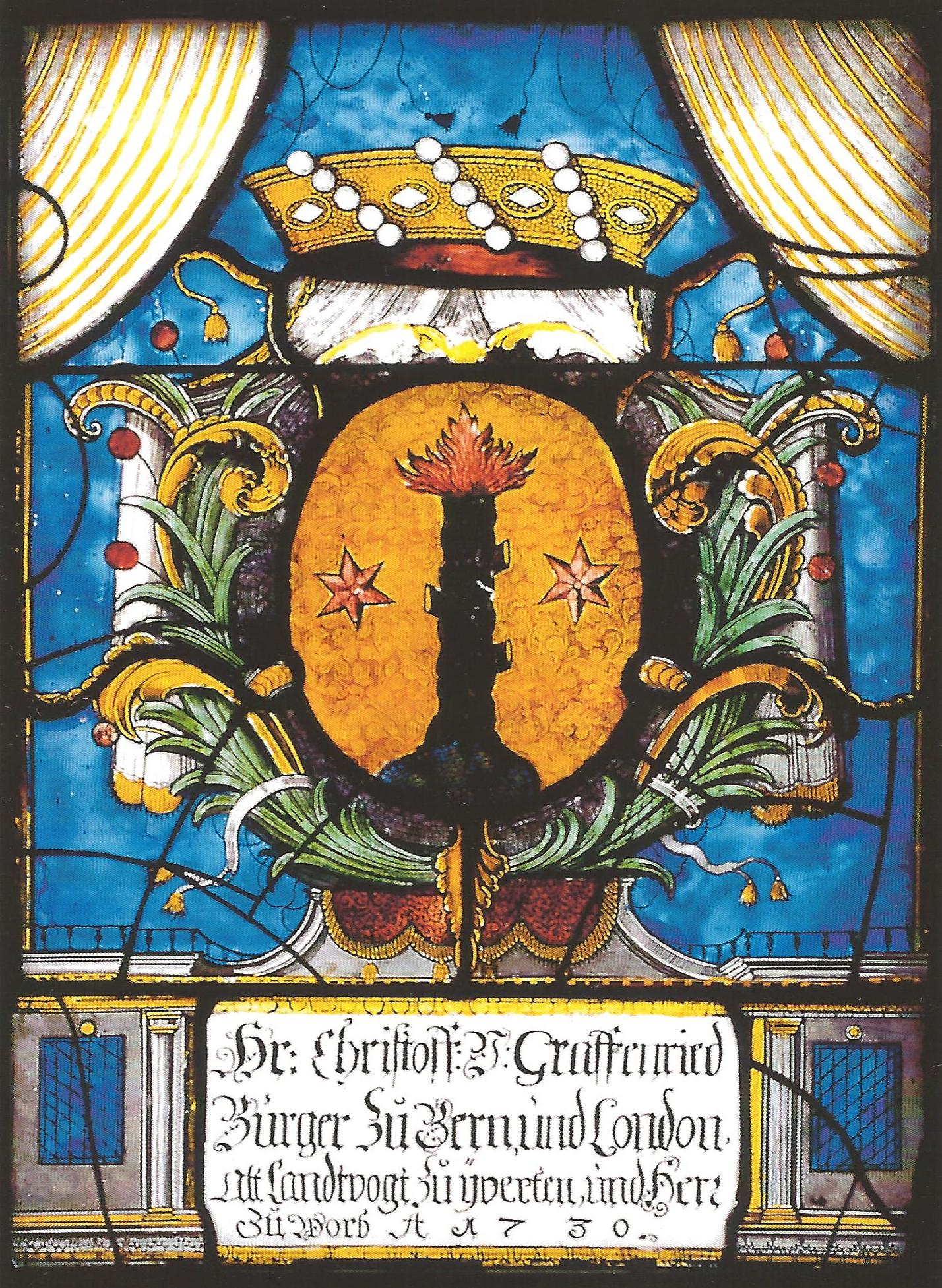
Memorial window in Worb Church

Late in 1714, Graffenried returned to Worb bankrupt and broken in spirit. It was several days before he could bring himself to face his father who had been critical of his efforts from the start. Perhaps in an effort to defend himself from critics, Graffenried soon wrote a manuscript entitled Relation of My American Project, detailing his exploits in America. He wrote at least three versions, one in German and two in French.

In 1731, Anton von Graffenried sold to his son Christoph the management of the estate which went with the office, reserving for himself the revenues of the office. The management of the estate was not very lucrative, but the father thought he had made a rather generous settlement for his spendthrift son. Later, when Anton became Mayor of Murton he wanted a representative in Iverton; and although Christoph did not relish the place, still to please his wife he ran for it and was elected. In 1730 at Anton's death the estate of Worb came to Christoph without encumbrance, and he held it till 1740, when he retired in favor of his sons. Three years later, in 1743, Graffenried died and was buried in the choir of the Church at Worb.

His son, Christoph, emigrated to America and married Barbara Tempest Needham, of Hertfordshire, England. Their offspring founded the American branch of the family, which adopted the French version of the name, De Graffenried. The family became prominent in both Virginia and Tennessee.

== Selected works ==
- Relation of My American Project (c. 1716)

Regnal titles
| New creation | Baron of Bernberg; 1709–1743 | Succeeded by Anton Tscharner de Graffenried |
| New creation | Landgrave of Carolina; 1709–1743 | Succeeded by Anton Tscharner de Graffenried |
| Preceded by Anton von Graffenried | Lord of Worb; 1730–1740 | Succeeded by Franz Ludwig von Graffenried |
