= Chief Hancock =

Tuscarora chief from North Carolina (c. 1670–1712)

Hancock

Tuscarora Chief
- In office c.1700–1712

Personal details
- Born: c.1670
- Died: 1712
- Nickname(s): Chief Hancock, King Hancock

Military service
- Battles/wars: Tuscarora War

Chief Hancock was the leader of the Lower Tuscarora towns during the opening stages of the Tuscarora War in North Carolina. He led a coalition of tribes and villages to resist English settlers and their colonial expansion. He was captured by Chief Tom Blount and executed in 1712 by settlers.

== Leadership and conflict ==
By the early 18th century, the Tuscarora people had become divided along Northern and Southern lines. The Upper Tuscarora towns, under Chief Tom Blount were friendly with the English while the Lower Tuscarora towns had become increasingly hostile. Hancock led this southern group, most likely playing a role in increasing hostilities.

Hancock led attacks and coordinated others along the Neuse River and to the town of Bath, North Carolina, killing around 100 colonists. Hancock captured Christoph von Graffenried, the founder of New Bern, North Carolina, as well as John Lawson (explorer). Lawson was executed while von Graffenried was let go.

== Death ==
The colonial government of North Carolina asked for assistance from the larger colony of South Carolina, which sent troops to aid Chief Tom Blount in subduing the Lower towns. Hancock was captured by this force and executed in 1712.

== Legacy ==
Chief Hancock is one of the more significant Indigenous leaders in early North Carolina history, representing one of the largest Native resistance campaigns to English colonial expansion.
