= Bennett Creek (Nansemond River tributary) =

Stream in Virginia, United States

Coordinates: 36°51′12″N 76°29′0″W

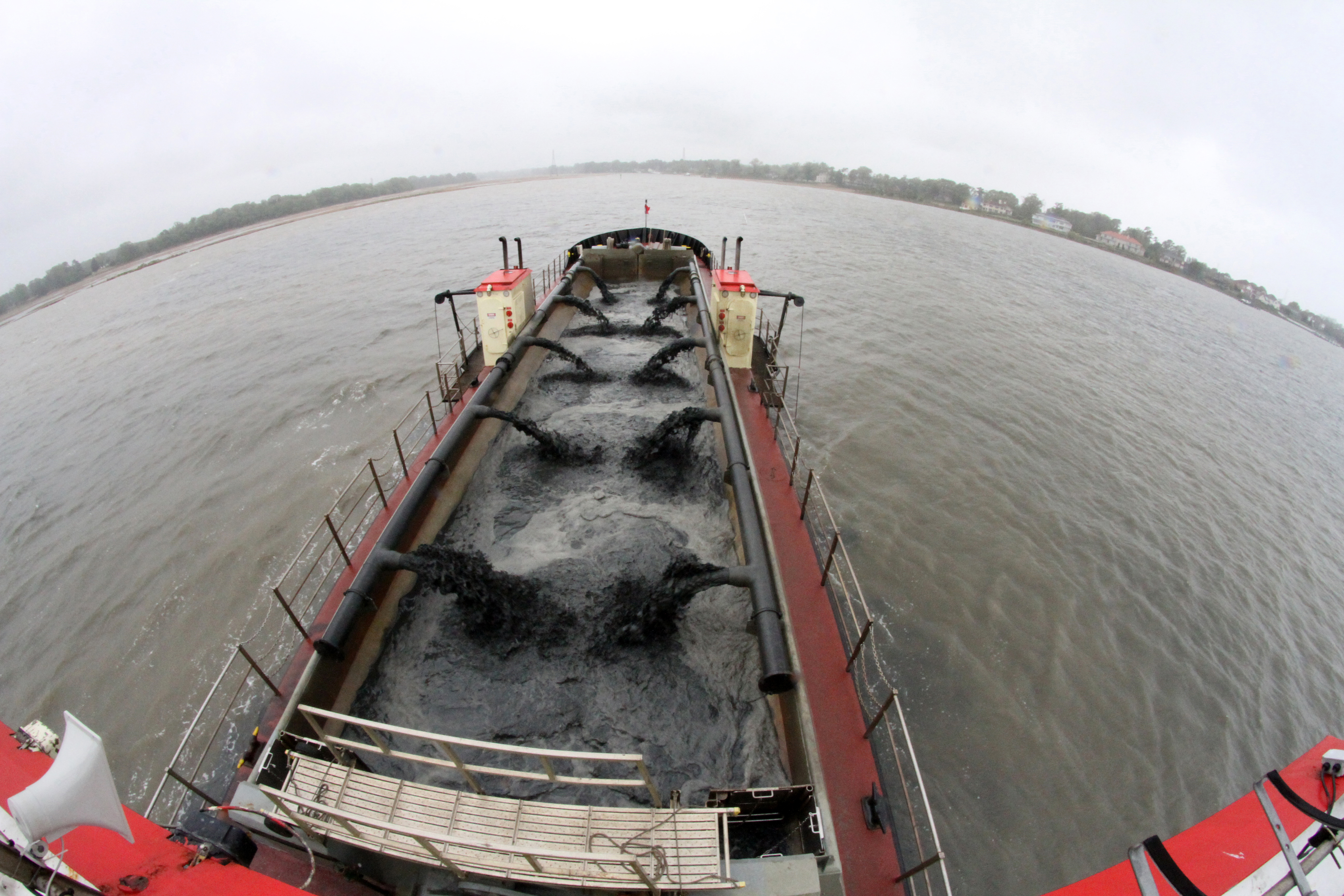
Pumps from the Army Corps of Engineers’ hopper dredge Currituck filters sand from Bennett's Creek to increase the depth from 2 to 6 feet, April 2013

Bennett Creek or Bennett's Creek is a 7.3-mile-long (11.7 km) tributary of the Nansemond River in Suffolk, Virginia.

Bennett’s Creek is a shallow-draft harbor that provides vital access to the Chesapeake Bay and the Atlantic Ocean. It serves a diverse mix of users, including commercial fishing vessels, charter and head boats, as well as a wide range of private recreational craft.

Bennett's Creek Park offers two free boat ramps that access the Nansemond River, a playground, tennis courts, restrooms, three covered shelters that can be reserved for use, a nature trail, open fields, a fishing and crabbing pier with handicap accessible features, and plenty of fresh air and sunshine. A 2.6-mile-long (4.2 km) canoe trail begins at the park boat ramp, passing through a tranquil salt marsh. Otter, raccoon, and nesting osprey are some of the wildlife viewing opportunities. The trail terminates at the confluence of the Nansemond River.

== History ==
Prior to the Jamestown landing, the Bennett Creek area was populated by Nansemond Indians. A series of land grants beginning June 26, 1635, handed the land around Bennett Creek to a group of Puritans led by Richard and Robert Bennett. Richard Bennett later became the first Puritan governor of Virginia after the English Civil War. His home was located on Bennett Creek; today a historical marker indicates the location.

In 1637 Nansemond County was formed including the Bennett Creek area. The county was first called Upper Norfolk County, but in 1646 it was renamed Nansemond for the Indian tribe.

In May 1779 a skirmish between Virginia militia and English troops under Gen. Edward Matthews occurred at Hargrove's Tavern near Bennett Creek. The English moved on to attack and burn Suffolk.

During the American Civil War, the Bennett Creek area was fortified with gun batteries. But the area was captured by Union troops by May 1862 soon after the ironclad CSS Virginia failed to hold off the U.S. Navy at the Battle of Hampton Roads (aka Monitor-Merrimack) within sight of the mouth of Bennett Creek.

Detailed historical records of the area are sparse because Nansemond County court records were destroyed in three separate fires, the earliest of which consumed the house of the court clerk in April 1734 (where the records were kept at that time), and the last on 7 February 1866.

== Restoration and Dredging ==
The most recent dredging of Bennett’s Creek was completed in January 2022, restoring a 3,350-foot channel to a depth of eight feet. The project was finished in just 11 days, during which approximately 14,881 cubic yards of material were removed and transported to Craney Island for placement.

The work was carried out by the U.S. Army Corps of Engineers using the dredge Murden and its crew. The Murden is owned, operated, and maintained by the USACE Wilmington District in North Carolina.

Maintenance dredging of Bennett’s Creek is performed on an as-needed basis under a longstanding partnership between the City of Suffolk and the U.S. Army Corps of Engineers. A portion of the project costs was funded through federal allocations provided by the Energy and Infrastructure Bill.

== See also ==
- List of rivers in Virginia
