= Machapunga =

Extinct Native American tribe of North Carolina

Total population
- extinct as a tribe (18th century)

Regions with significant populations
- Eastern North Carolina

Languages
- Carolina Algonquian language

Religion
- Indigenous religion

Related ethnic groups
- Secotan, other North Carolina Algonquians

The Machapunga were a small Algonquian language–speaking Native American tribe from coastal northeastern North Carolina. They were part of the Secotan people. They were a group from the Powhatan Confederacy who migrated from present-day Virginia.

Machpunga is also the name of an early 16th-century village on the Potomac River and of an 18th-century Powhatan Confederacy village in Northampton County, Virginia.

== Name ==
Anthropologist John Reed Swanton wrote that Machapunga meant "bad dust" or "much dirt" in their Algonquian language.

== Language ==
The Machapunga spoke an Carolina Algonquian language which became extinct.

== Territory ==
The Machapunga lived in what is now Hyde County, North Carolina. Their lands may have extended into present-day Beaufort, North Carolina, as well as Washington, Tyrrell, and Dare counties.

In 1700 and 1701, the Machapunga maintained a village named Mattamuskeet. It held 30 warriors and was likely located on the shore of Mattamuskeet Lake in present-day Hyde County.

== History ==
Early 20th-century ethnographer Frank Speck believed that the historical Machapunga and other Algonquian tribes in North Carolina had probably been earlier connected to the larger population based in coastal Virginia. He believed the tribes in North Carolina were part of an early and large Algonquian migration south after European contact. He noted the presence of Algonquian-speaking tribes on the Northeast coast and in eastern and central Canada.

=== 16th century ===
Swanton wrote that when the British founded the Roanoke Colony that lasted from 1585 to 1586, Secotan people moved in with the Machapunga.

=== 17th century ===
Ethnographer James Mooney estimated in 1600 there were 1,200 Machapunga and related tribes.

=== 18th century ===
By 1701, the Machapunga consolidated into a single village named Mattamuskeet. In 1701, English explorer John Lawson wrote that the tribe had about 100 members who lived on the mainland. In 1713, the Machapunga were described as being excellent watermen, that is, boatsmen.

In 1711 they participated in the Tuscarora War against the colonists. By 1715, the English colonists assigned a tract of land on Mattamuskeet Lake to the surviving Machapunga and Coree, who lived in a single village. The Coree soon left and joined the Tuscaroras.

From 1718 to 1746, John Squires emerged as a leader on the tract, or Mattamuskeet reservation. John Mackey and Long Tom served as his advisors. His son Charles Squires followed him as a leader; however, his influence declined from 1752 to 1760. A deed to the Mattamuskeet reservation was signed by six Machapunga men in 1761. Even before 1727, Machapunga residents began selling their land until 1761, which the land had all been sold.

Scattered Machapunga families still resided in North Carolina in 1761. Then missionary Rev. Alexander Stewart founded a school for eight Native children and two African-American children. Roanoke and Hatteras people moved into the area. Stewart wrote that he had baptized seven "Attamuskeet, Hatteras, and Roanoke" adults and children. In 1763, he baptized 21 more Native people from that region.

The Machapunga ultimately became extinct as a tribe in the 18th century. "After the expulsion of the Tuscarora from North Carolina the coast tribes seem to have faded from history and, so far as I can find, we have no definite mention of them in the nineteenth century," wrote anthropologist Frank Speck. "Sporadic references to Indians persisted in the Hyde County records until the early nineteenth century," wrote archaeologist Patrick H. Garrow in 1975.

== Descendants ==
Frank Speck wrote in 1916 that "a few families of mixed-blood descendants of the local Indian tribes" lived on Roanoke Island, surrounding islands, and in Dare and Hydes counties in North Carolina. Locals told him that "a few individuals who are descended from Indians who came originally from Pungo river near Mattamuskeet lake" lived in the area. They descended from Israel Pierce, "known as a Pungo river Indian"; however, he offered no evidence for his claim. Speck met Mrs. M.H. Pugh, granddaughter of Israel Pierce. He wrote, "Not one of these people knew a single word of the Indian language and not one knew of any definite Indian customs or traditions, not even the name of their tribe." However, he noted that they fished. Patrick Garrow traced the identity of some Mattamuskeet descendents, including Jordan and Price Longtom and Shadrach and Simpson Mackey, and noted that people who shared their surnames were categorized as "free persons of color."

=== Modern organization ===
An unrecognized organization, alternately known as the Machapunga Tribe of North Carolina or the Machapunga-Mattamuskeet Indians of North Carolina, represents individuals who state they are of Machapunga descent. They are not state-recognized or federally recognized as a Native American tribe.
