= Pamlico River =

River in North Carolina, the United States of America

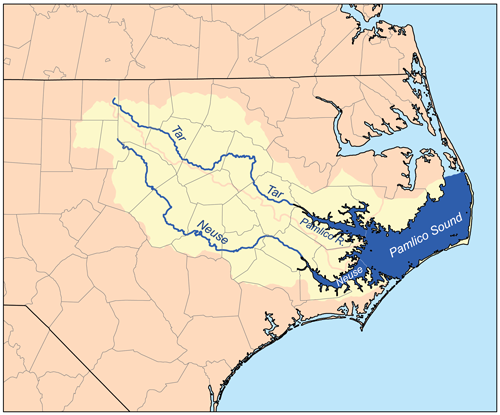
- The Pamlico Sound watershed

- Location of mouth

Location
- Country: United States
- State: North Carolina
- Counties: Pamlico, Hyde, Beaufort

Physical characteristics
- Source
  - coordinates: 35.5523849°N 77.0846757°W
- Mouth
  - coordinates: 35°19′6″N 76°25′58″W

The Pamlico /ˈpæmlɪkoʊ/ River is a tidal river that flows into Pamlico Sound, in North Carolina in the United States. It is formed by the confluence of the Tar River and Tranters Creek.

The historic Tuscarora tribe, an Iroquoian-language group originally from western New York, had been well established in North Carolina, including along the Pamlico River, before European contact. The encroachment of settlers and their selling Tuscarora into slavery increased tensions between the groups. These led to the Tuscarora War (1711-1715), in which the Tuscarora led by Chief Hancock were defeated. Most Tuscarora migrated to New York, where they were sponsored by the Oneida and by 1722 were admitted to the Iroquois Confederacy as the Sixth Nation. Most of the survivors in North Carolina were removed to a reservation in Bertie County, North Carolina, in 1718. Since European contact, they had lost much population due to lack of immunity to new infectious diseases, followed by the casualties of war.

English, Irish, and Scottish settlers moved to the region from Virginia for larger tracts of cheaper land. A cluster of German and Swiss settlers also moved to the region from the southeastern settlement of New Bern, North Carolina. They established such towns as Washington and Bath. The latter was home and operating base for the pirate Blackbeard, who was finally pardoned by Governor Charles Eden. Most settlers engaged in tobacco farming in the Pamlico/Tar River basin, importing numerous enslaved Africans to work on the labor-intensive crop. For years the river corridor remained somewhat of a lawless backwater.

The Pamlico River was a key strategic position during the American Civil War. The river is the site of the sunken Union warship, USS Picket. The U.S. Route 17 Bridge, which connects Washington, North Carolina, with nearby Chocowinity, splits the name of the river. That portion heading westward upstream is called the Tar River.

== Present ==
Though the river no longer has any steamers and cargo ships floating down it, it still carries hundreds of boats per year. It is a popular fishing spot. Tobacco farming continues on agricultural land.

While fishkills were a bigger problem around the year 2000, state authorities still warn against eating the river's shellfish. Though the river still faces some environmental problems, it is a beautiful tidal river that supports a variety of aquatic species. It is linked to the history of thousands of years of human settlement, from the earliest indigenous peoples, through the Tuscarora and later European and American settlers.

== See also ==
- South Atlantic-Gulf Water Resource Region
