= Coree =

Extinct Native American tribe in North Carolina

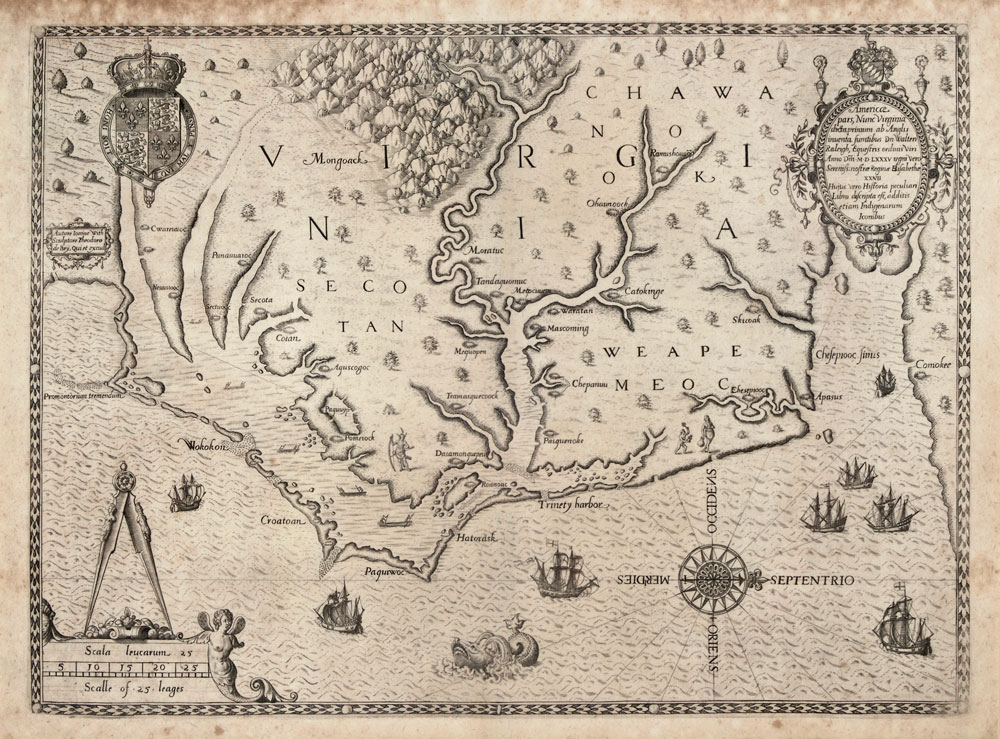
- 1585 map by Theodor de Bry with Cwareuuoc village in top left corner along Neuse River

Total population
- extinct as a tribe adopted into the Tuscaroras

Regions with significant populations
- North Carolina

Languages
- unclassified

Religion
- Native American

Related ethnic groups
- Tuscarora and Neusiok

The Coree were a small Native American tribe, who once occupied a coastal area south of the Neuse River in southeastern North Carolina in the area now covered by Carteret and Craven counties. Scholars are unsure of what language they spoke, but the coastal areas were mostly populated by Iroquoian-speaking and Algonquian-speaking peoples. After the Tuscarora War and the Coree War, the Coree were essentially absorbed into other native populations, primarily into the Tuscarora Tribe.

== History ==
The Coree were not described by English colonists until 1701, by which time their population had already been reduced to as few as 125 members, likely due to epidemics of infectious disease and warfare. In the early 18th century, the Coree and several others were allied with the Tuscaroras against the colonists. In 1711, they participated in the Tuscarora War, as well as the Coree War, trying to drive out the English settlers. The alliance was unsuccessful and suffered many fatalities.

By 1715, surviving Coree were merged into the neighboring Machapunga and settled in their town of Mattamuskeet in present-day Hyde County. This was on the shore of Lake Mattamuskeet.

The Coree soon left the Machapunga and were adopted by the Tuscaroras.

== Language ==
Coree
- Native to: United States
- Region: North Carolina
- Ethnicity: Coree
- Extinct: 18th century
- Language family: unclassified

Language codes
- ISO 639-3: None (mis)
- Linguist List: 075
- Glottolog: None

The ethnographer James Mooney speculated that the Coree were related to the Iroquoian-speaking Cherokee, but he did not have convincing evidence. According to limited colonial reports, they spoke a language that did not appear to be mutually intelligible with any of the three major language stocks (Carolina Algonquian, Iroquoian Tuscarora, and Cawtaban Woccon, possibly Waccamaw, to John Lawson, who described Coree after recording vocabularies of the other three. While living with the Coree for 2 years, John Lawson wrote that he talked to a women from 'beyond the mountains' who spoke a language he considered completely mutually intelligble with Coree outside of a few loan words. Nations that lived beyond the mountains were the Cherokee, Yuchi and Kosati.

On the other hand, the Coree occupied territory that was historically mostly that of Tuscaroras, which suggests they were affiliated with these peoples, whom they ultimately merged into.

== Bibliography ==
- Hodge, Frederick Webb (1912). Handbook of American Indians North of Mexico. Washington, D.C.: U.S. Government Printing Office.
- Ives Goddard. (2005). "The Indigenous Languages of the Southeast", Anthropological Linguistics, 47 (1), 1–60.
- Ruth Y. Wetmore (1975), "First on the Land: The North Carolina Indians" .
