= Tuscarora War =

1711–15 British colonial war in North Carolina

- Part of the American Indian Wars
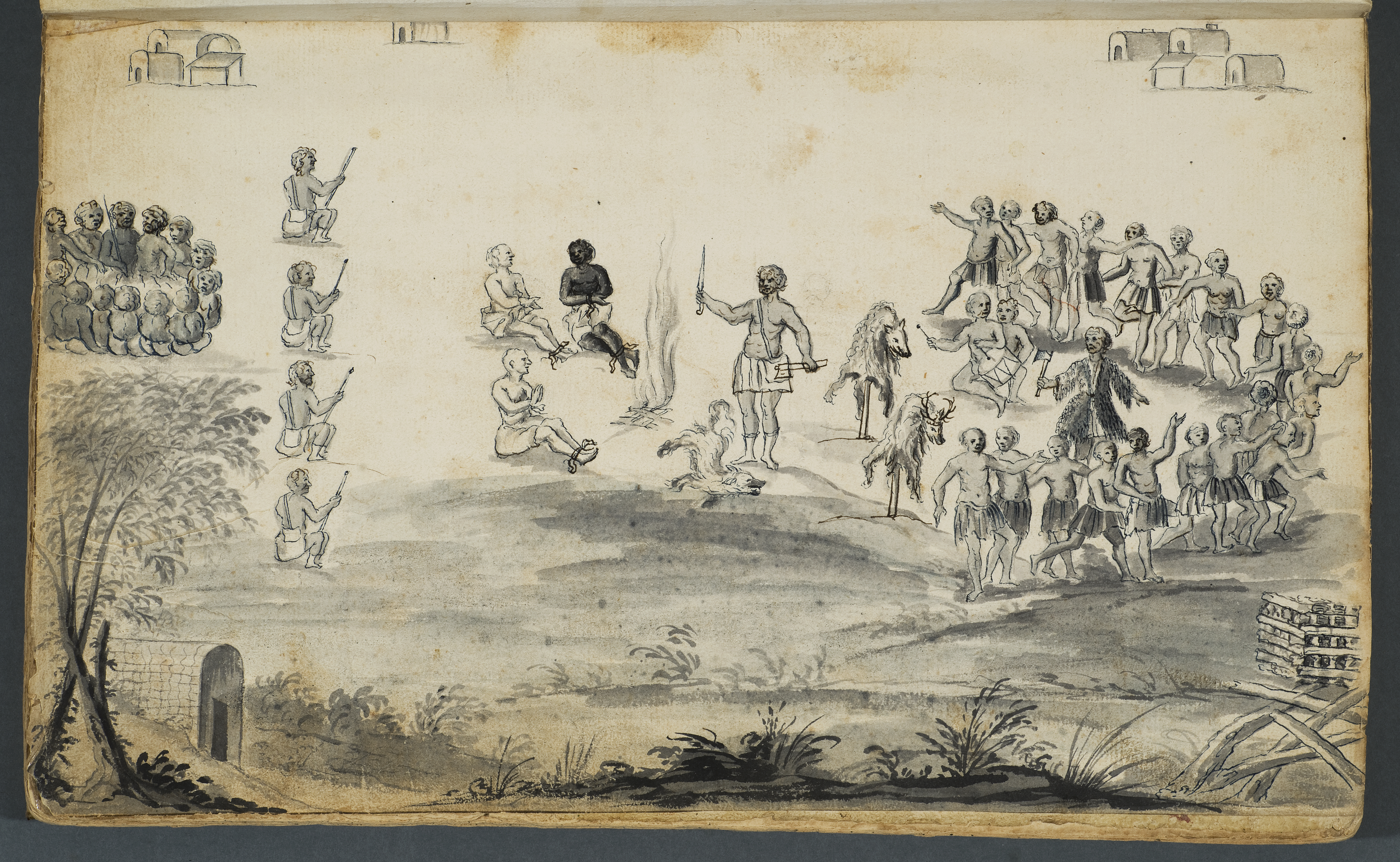
- The execution of John Lawson on September 16, 1711.
Date	September 10, 1711 – February 11, 1715 (3 years and 154 days)
Location	Eastern North Carolina
Result	British colonial victory: Tuscaroras migrate to New York

Belligerents
North Carolina; South Carolina; Northern Tuscarora; Apalachee; Catawba; Cherokee; Yamasee	Southern Tuscarora; Coree; Cothechney; Machapunga; Mattamuskeet; Neusiok; Pamlico; Seneca; Weetock

Commanders and leaders
Edward Hyde; John Barnwell; James Moore; Baron of Bernberg (surrendered); John Lawson (executed); Chief Tom Blount	Chief Hancock (executed)

The Tuscarora War was fought in North Carolina from September 10, 1711, until February 11, 1715, between the Tuscarora people and their allies on one side and European American settlers, the Yamasee, and other allies on the other. This was considered the bloodiest colonial war in North Carolina. The Tuscarora signed a treaty with colonial officials in 1718 and settled on a reserved tract of land in Bertie County, North Carolina. The war incited further conflict on the part of the Tuscarora and led to changes in the slave trade of North and South Carolina.

The first successful English settlement of North Carolina had begun in 1653. The Tuscarora lived in peace with the settlers for more than 50 years, while nearly every other colony in America was involved in some conflict with Native Americans. After the early 18th century war, most of the Tuscarora migrated north to New York. They joined the Five Nations of the Haudenosaunee Confederacy, all Iroquoian-speaking peoples, as the sixth nation.

== History ==
The Tuscarora are an Iroquoian people who are believed to have migrated from the Great Lakes area into the Piedmont centuries before European colonization. The other Iroquoian-speaking peoples were based largely in what became New York and Pennsylvania.

=== Tensions ===
As the English settled Carolina, the Tuscarora benefited from trade with the colonists. By acquiring weapons and metal goods from the English, they were able to develop commercial dominance over other tribes in the region. These benefits were experienced to a greater degree by Northern Tuscarora than their Southern counterparts, who became cut off from the prosperous Northern Tuscarora by increasing numbers of European settlers. Over time colonists continued to push into Tuscarora Country.

As the settlers moved closer to the Tuscarora and the two began interacting more frequently, conflict arose over competition for resources, shared hunting grounds and cultural differences. The Tuscarora held John Lawson accountable for his role in the settlers' expansion into their territory. Lawson's writings emphasized the potential that the lands held for European settlement, and he was resented for his perceived role in the founding of New Bern, a settlement that encroached on Tuscarora territory. Settlers found eastern North Carolina to be swampy and difficult to farm, so they pushed westward, attracted by the more fertile uplands. As settlement expanded, their demand for workers increased demand for the Indian slave trade in the region. These factors all led to tension between the Tuscarora and the growing population of Anglo colonists.

==== Outbreak of War ====
There were two groups of Tuscarora in North Carolina in the early 18th century, a northern group led by Chief Tom Blount and a southern group was led by Chief Hancock. Blount occupied the area around Bertie County on the Roanoke River; Hancock was closer to New Bern, occupying the area south of the Pamlico River. Blount became close friends with the influential Blount family of the Bertie region, but Hancock's people had suffered raids and kidnappings by slave traders.

Hancock's tribe began to attack the settlers, but Blount's tribe did not become involved in the war at this point. Some historians including Richard White and Rebecca Seaman have suggested that the war grew out of misunderstandings between the colonists and the Tuscaroras. The Southern Tuscaroras led by Hancock allied with the Bear River tribe, Coree, Cothechney, Machapunga, Mattamuskeet, Neuse, Pamlico, Senequa, and Weetock to attack the settlers in a wide range within a short time period. They attacked homesteads along the Roanoke, Neuse, and Trent rivers and in the city of Bath beginning on September 22, 1711, and killed hundreds of settlers, including several key colonial political figures, such as John Lawson of Bath, while driving off others. The Baron of Bernberg was a prisoner of the Tuscarora during the raids, and he recounted stories of women impaled on stakes, more than 80 infants slaughtered, and more than 130 settlers killed in the New Bern settlement.

== Barnwell's expedition ==
In 1711, the North Carolina colony had been weakened by Cary's Rebellion, and Governor Edward Hyde asked South Carolina for assistance. South Carolina sent Colonel John Barnwell with a force of 30 white officers and about 500 Native Americans from South Carolina, including Yamasee, Wateree, Congaree, Waxhaw, Pee Dee, and Apalachee. Barnwell's expedition traveled over 300 miles and arrived in January 1712. There the force was supplemented by 50 local militiamen and attacked the Tuscarora, who retreated to Fort Neoheroka in Greene County. The Tuscarora negotiated a truce and released their prisoners.

Barnwell's expedition did not win the war. Barnwell left for South Carolina, displeasing the North Carolina settlers who wished for a total victory over the Tuscarora. The South Carolinians were unhappy that there was no payment for their help. Additionally, some South Carolina officers retained Tuscarora to sell as slaves, which incited the Tuscarora into a new wave of attacks. These attacks came amid a yellow fever outbreak that weakened the North Carolina colony; the combined pressure caused many settlers to flee. Governor Thomas Pollack requested the aid of South Carolina.

== Chief Blount and the Moore Expedition ==
South Carolina dispatched Colonel James Moore with a force of 33 colonists and nearly 1,000 Native Americans, which arrived in December 1712. The settlers offered Blount control of the entire Tuscarora tribe if he assisted them in defeating Hancock. Blount captured Hancock, and the settlers executed him in 1712.

In 1713, the Southern Tuscarora lost their Fort Neoheroka in Greene County. Neoheroka was one of several Tuscarora forts of that time. Others include Torhunta, Innennits, and Catechna. These forts were all destroyed during the Tuscarora War by North Carolina colonists. An archaeological analysis of Fort Neoheroka indicates that the Tuscarora were adapting to modern methods of warfare in North America, specifically the advent of firearms, explosives and artillery. Ultimately, it was not the defensive limitations of the Tuscarora that cost them at Fort Neoheroka, which was in fact "...equal to, if not superior to, comparable Euro-American frontier fortifications of the same era." However, the Tuscarora's arsenal lacked a large supply of the sophisticated artillery and explosives employed by their opponents. About 950 people were killed or captured and sold into slavery in the Caribbean or New England by Colonel Moore and his South Carolina troops.

== Aftermath ==
Following the decisive defeat, many Tuscarora began a migration to New York. There they joined the Five Nations of the Haudenosaunee Confederacy and were accepted as the Sixth Nation in 1722. Some Tuscarora bands remained in North Carolina with Blount for decades, with the last leaving for New York in 1802.

=== Further conflict ===
The Tuscarora War did not ensure lasting peace in the region. On Good Friday, April 15, 1715, a group of Native Americans attacked South Carolina. Among them were Apalachees, Savannahs, Lower Creeks, Cherokees, and Yamasees, as well as others. These were all allies of Colonels Barnwell and Moore during the Tuscarora War. This attack began what is known as the Yamasee War. The Yamasee and other tribes in South Carolina learned from the Tuscarora War that colonial settlers were heavily invested in the slave trade of Native Americans. Furthermore, the Tuscarora War had drastically cut down the number of Native Americans in the area who could be enslaved. With this in mind, the tribes of South Carolina decided on a preemptive attack. As one historian put it, "[b]etter to stand together as Indians, hit the colony now before it became any stronger, kill the traders, destroy the plantations, burn Charles Town, and put an end to the slave buyers." During the Yamasee War, Col. Maurice Moore, the brother of Colonel James Moore, led a regiment in the battle against the Yamasee. Among his regiment were some seventy Tuscarora warriors who were keen to fight against the Yamasee, a tribe who had fought against them during the Tuscarora War. Following the Yamasee War, these Tuscarora were asked by South Carolina officials to remain in South Carolina as their allies and to protect the colony from Spain and its Native American allies. As part of the arrangement, South Carolina would return to the Tuscarora one slave taken during the Tuscarora War for each Tuscarora killed in the line of duty and for each enemy Native American they captured. During this time, the Tuscarora came to be so well respected by the South Carolina government that they were given land in the colony. The Yamasee War and other conflicts between the remaining Tuscarora and other Native American groups in the region are examples of how the Tuscarora War destabilized relationships among southern Native Americans.

=== Effect on slavery ===
The Tuscarora War and the Yamasee War were turning points in the Carolinas' slave trade. By 1717, South Carolina began to regulate its slave trade. Additionally, after two wars between colonists and Native Americans, the number of Native Americans available to be enslaved had fallen considerably. The most valuable role of Native Americans also shifted during this time from slave to ally because of the ongoing power struggle between the French and English to control North America. Because colonists sought to ally themselves with Native Americans, the market for negro slaves began to grow.

=== Legacy ===
Nearly 300 years after the Tuscarora were defeated at Fort Neoheroka, the fort was added to the National Register of Historic Places on July 17, 2009. A monument was constructed and commemorated there in March 2013. The ceremony was attended by Tuscarora descendants, some from New York and others from North Carolina.

== See also ==
- Wars of the indigenous peoples of North America
- List of Indian massacres
- List of conflicts in British America
- Cary's Rebellion
