= Tuscarora people =

Indigenous people of Canada and U.S.

Tuscarora
Skarù·ręˀ
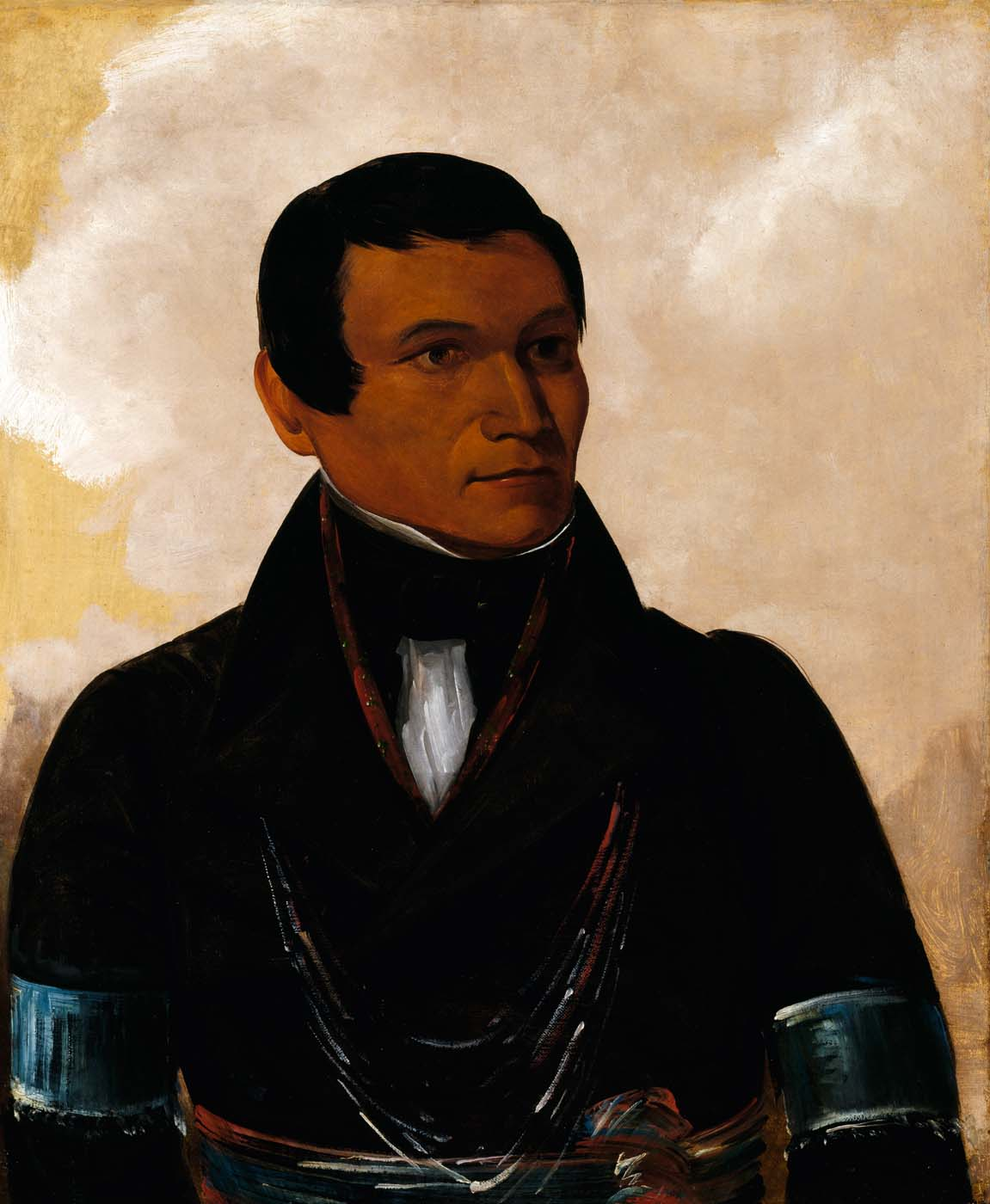
- Cú-sick, member of the Tuscarora tribe of Six Nations.

Total population
- 17,412

Regions with significant populations
- By 17th century in North Carolina; 21st century: New York, United States and Ontario, Canada, North Carolina.

Languages
- English, formerly Tuscarora

Religion
- Christianity, Longhouse, other Indigenous religions

Related ethnic groups
- Other Haudenosaunee, Meherrin, and Nottoway

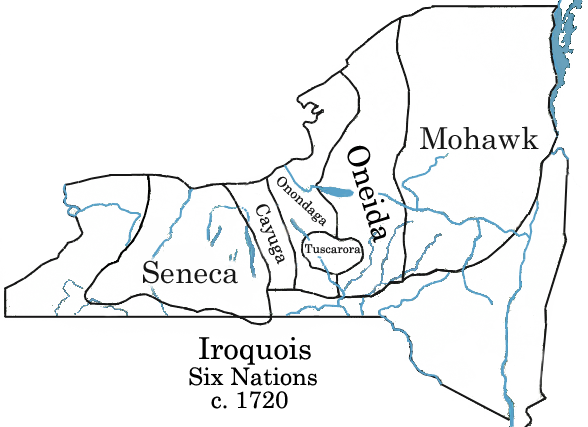
In 1722, the Tuscarora, who had migrated north from the Carolinas to New York, became the sixth nation of the Haudenosaunee Confederacy.

The Tuscarora (Tuscarora: Skarù·ręˀ) are an Indigenous people of the Northeastern Woodlands in Canada and the United States. They are an Iroquoian people, recognized as a Native American tribe in the United States and as a First Nations people in Canada. The Tuscarora Nation, a federally recognized tribe, is based in New York, and Tuscarora First Nation in Canada is part of the Six Nations of the Grand River in Ontario. Prior to European contact, the Tuscarora lived in the Carolinas along the Roanoke, Neuse (Neyuherú·kęˀ Kì·nęˀ), Tar, and Pamlico Rivers. They were forced to migrate from North Carolina following conflicts with British colonists.

Following their defeat in the 1711 to 1713 Tuscarora War at the hands of British colonists and their Indian allies, most surviving Tuscarora left North Carolina and migrated north to Pennsylvania and New York, over a 90-year period. They aligned with the Haudenosaunee (Iroquois) in New York, because of their ancestral linguistic and cultural connections. In 1722, sponsored by the Oneida, the Tuscarora were accepted as the sixth nation of the Haudenosaunee Confederacy.

After the American Revolution, those Tuscarora who allied with the colonists shared reservation land with the Oneida before gaining their own. Today, the Tuscarora Nation of New York is a federally recognized tribe. Tuscarora who allied with the British during the American Revolutionary War resettled with other Haudenosaunee people to Ontario, where they formed the Tuscarora First Nation, part of the Six Nations of the Grand River.

Only the tribes in New York and Ontario have been recognized on a government-to-government basis by the respective national governments. After the migration was completed in the early 19th century, the Tuscarora in New York no longer considered those remaining in North Carolina as members of the tribal nation. Since the late 20th century, some North Carolina individuals claiming Tuscarora ancestry formed organizations self-identifying as tribes.

== Name ==
The Tuscaroras' autonym, Skarù·ręˀ, may translate to "hemp gatherers" or "shirt-wearing people".

== History ==
=== Precontact to 17th century ===
The Tuscarora people were a confederacy of three tribes, when first encountered by Europeans in North Carolina. These were the:

- Katenuaka (people of the submerged pine trees), Kautanohakau
- Akawenteaka (people of the water), Kawenteaka, Agwantega, Kauwetsaka, Kauwetseka
- Skaruren (hemp gatherers), Skarū're^{n}, Skuarureaka

The members of these three tribes belonged to about seven matrilineal clans: Bear (Uhčíhręˀ), Beaver (Rakinęhá·ka·ˀ), Deer, Eel (Akunęhukwatíha·ˀ), Snipe (Tawístawis), Turtle (Ráˀkwihs), and Wolf (Θkwarì·nę); however, clans may have had different subclans throughout time.

These affiliations continued to be active as independent groups after the tribe migrated to New York, and later Ontario. F. W. Hodge, an early 19th-century historian, wrote that the Tuscarora in North Carolina traditionally were said to occupy the "country lying between the sea shores and the mountains, which divide the Atlantic states," in which they had 24 large towns and could muster about 6,000 warriors, probably meaning persons.

=== 18th century ===
In early 18th-century North Carolina, British colonists reported two primary branches of the Tuscarora: A northern group led by Chief Tom Blunt, and a southern group led by Chief Hancock. Varying accounts around 1708–1710 estimated the number of Tuscarora warriors as from 1200 to 2000. Historians estimate their total population may have been three to four times that number. Chief Blunt occupied the area around what is present-day Bertie County, North Carolina, on the Roanoke River. Chief Hancock lived closer to present-day New Bern, occupying the area south of the Pamlico River. Chief Blunt became close friends with the colonial Blount family of the Bertie region and lived peacefully.

By contrast, Chief Hancock had to deal with far more colonists encroaching on his community. They raided his villages and kidnapped people to sell into slavery. Colonists transported some Tuscarora to Pennsylvania to sell into slavery. Both groups of Tuscarora suffered substantial population losses after exposure to Eurasian infectious diseases endemic to Europeans. Both also suffered territorial encroachment. By 1711, Chief Hancock believed he had to fight against the colonists to fight back. Chief Tom Blunt did not join him in the war.

The southern Tuscarora collaborated with the Pamlico, Cothechney, Coree, Mattamuskeet, and Matchepungoe nations to attack nearby British colonists in a wide range of locations within a short time. Their principal targets were against the colonists on the Roanoke, Neuse, and Trent Rivers, as well as the city of Bath. They attacked on September 22, 1711, beginning the Tuscarora War. The allied Indian tribes killed hundreds of settlers, including several key political figures among the colonists.

Governor Edward Hyde called out the North Carolina Militia and secured the assistance of Province of South Carolina, which provided 600 militiamen and 360 British-allied Indians commanded by Colonel John Barnwell. In 1712, this force attacked the southern Tuscarora and other nations in Craven County at Fort Narhontes, on the banks of the Neuse River. The Tuscarora were forced to retreat to a fort in Greene County, where they surrendered.

The governor offered Chief Blunt leadership of the entire Tuscarora Nation if he would assist in defeating Chief Hancock. Blunt succeeded in capturing Hancock, who was tried and executed by North Carolina officials. In 1713, the southern Tuscarora were defeated at Neyuherú·kęˀ (Fort Neoheroka, formerly spelled Neherooka), with 900 killed or captured in the battle.

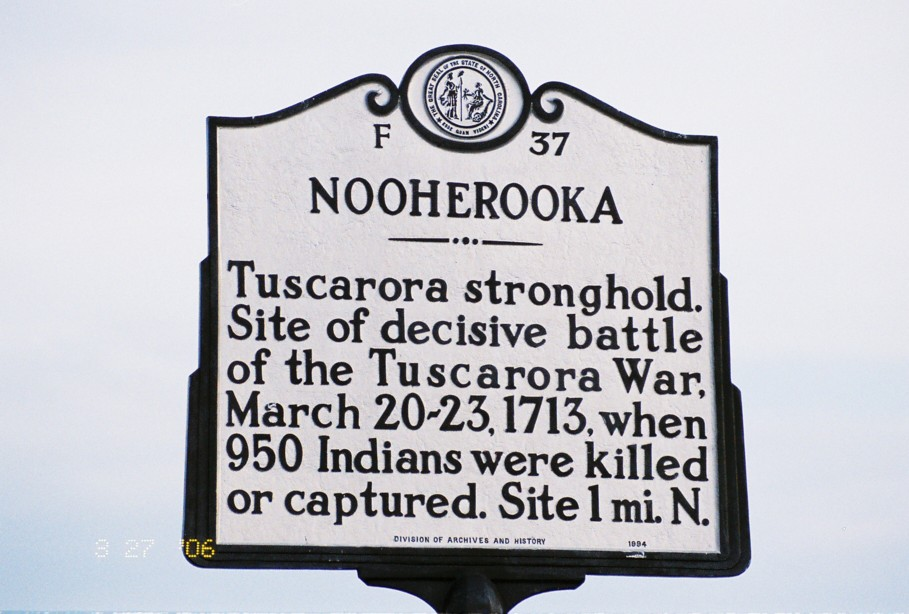
Fort Neoheroka Historical Marker

Following their defeat in the conflict in 1713, about 1,500 Tuscarora fled north to New York to join the Haudenosaunee Confederacy, while as many as 1500 additional Tuscarora sought refuge in the British colony of Virginia. Although some accepted tributary status in Virginia, most of the surviving Tuscarora are believed to have returned to North Carolina. In 1715, about 70 warriors of the southern Tuscarora went to South Carolina to assist colonists against the Yamasee. Those 70 warriors later asked permission to have their wives and children join them, and settled near Port Royal, South Carolina.

Under the leadership of Tom Blunt, the Tuscarora who remained in North Carolina signed a treaty with the colony in June 1718. It granted them a 56,000-acre (23,000 ha) tract of land on the Roanoke River in what is now Bertie County. This was the area occupied by Chief Blunt and his people. The colonial governments of Virginia and North Carolina both recognized Tom Blunt, who had taken the last name Blount, as "King Tom Blount" of the Tuscarora. Both colonies agreed to consider as friendly only those Tuscarora who accepted Blount's leadership. The remaining southern Tuscarora were forced to remove from their villages on the Pamlico River and relocate to the villages of Ooneroy and Resootskeh (Tuscarora: Rahsutáˀkye) in Bertie County. In 1722, the Bertie County Reservation, which would officially become known as Indian Woods, was chartered by the colony.

As colonial settlement surrounded Indian Woods, the Tuscarora suffered discrimination and other acts; they were overcharged or denied use of ferries, restricted in hunting, and cheated in trade; their timber was illegally logged, and their lands were continuously encroached upon by herders and squatters. Over the next several decades, the colonial government continually reduced the Tuscarora tract, forcing cessions of land to the encroaching settlers. They sold off portions of the land in deals often designed to take advantage of the Tuscarora.

Many Tuscarora were not satisfied with the leadership of Tom Blount, and decided to leave the reservation. In 1722, about 300 fighting men, along with their wives, children, and the elderly, resided at Indian Woods. By 1731, the population fell to 200 warriors, and by 1755, only 100 warriors remained, with a total population at Indian Woods of 301. When Moravian missionaries visited the reservation in 1752, they had noted "many had gone north to live on the Susquehanna" and that "others are scattered as the wind scatters smoke." This refers to the Tuscarora migrating to central-western New York to live with the Oneida and other Haudenosaunee nations.

In 1763 and 1766, additional Tuscarora migrated north to settle with other Iroquoian peoples in northern and western Pennsylvania and in New York. By 1767, only 104 persons were residing on the reservation in Bertie County. In 1804, the last band to leave North Carolina went to New York. By then, only "10 to 20 old families" remained at Indian Woods.

=== 19th century ===
In 1802, the last Indian Woods Tuscarora negotiated a treaty with the United States, by which land would be held for them that they could lease. As the government never ratified the treaty, the North Carolina Tuscarora viewed the treaty as null and void. In 1831, the Indian Woods Tuscarora sold the remaining rights to their lands. By this point, their 56,000-acre (23,000 ha) area had been reduced to 2,000 acres (810 ha).

Although without a reservation, some Tuscarora descendants remained in the southern regions of the state, intermarrying with European settlers. In 1971, the Tuscarora in Robeson County sought to get an accounting of their lands and rents due them under the unratified treaty of 1803. At least three bands who self-identify as Tuscarora have organized in Robeson County. In 2010, they united as one group.

== Migration north ==
The Haudenosaunee (Five Nations) of New York had penetrated as far as the Tuscarora homeland in North Carolina by 1701, and nominally controlled the entire frontier territory lying in between. Following their discovery of a linguistically related people living beyond Virginia, they were more than happy to accommodate their distant cousins within the Haudenosaunee Constitution as the "Sixth Nation", and to resettle them in safer grounds to the north (The Haudenosaunee had driven the rival Erie people out of western New York to South Carolina during the Beaver Wars several decades earlier, not far from where the Tuscarora resided).

Beginning about 1713 after the war, contingents of Tuscarora began leaving North Carolina for the north. They established a main village at present-day Martinsburg, West Virginia, on what is still known as Tuscarora Creek. After European settlers began to pour into the area from around 1730, the Tuscarora continued northward to join those in western New York. Another group stopped in 1719–1721 in present-day Maryland along the Monocacy River, on the way to join the Oneida nation in western New York. Other Tuscarora bands sojourned in the Juniata River valley of Pennsylvania, before reaching New York.

The present area from Martinsburg, West Virginia, west to Berkeley Springs, has roads, creeks, and land still named after the Tuscarora people, including The Woods, a development in Hedgesville where the street names contain reference to the Tuscarora people, and which contains a burial mound adopted by the West Virginia Division of Culture as an archaeological site in 1998. A record circa 1763 indicates that some Tuscarora had not migrated to the Haudenosaunee, and remained in the Panhandle, instead, and stayed and fought under Shawnee Chief Cornstalk.

During the American Revolutionary War, part of the Tuscarora and Oneida nations in New York allied with the rebel colonists. Most of the warriors of the other four Haudenosaunee nations supported Great Britain, and many participated in battles throughout New York. They were the main forces that attacked frontier settlements of the central Mohawk and Cherry Valleys. Late in the war, the pro-British Tuscarora followed Joseph Brant of the Mohawk, other British-allied tribes, and Loyalists north to Ontario, then called Upper Canada by the British. They took part in establishing the reserve of the Six Nations of the Grand River First Nation in what became Ontario, Canada.

In 1803, a final contingent of southern Tuscarora migrated to New York to join the reservation of their tribe in Niagara County. After that, the Tuscarora in New York no longer considered southern remnants as part of their nation. Some descendants of the southern remnants have continued to identify as Tuscarora and have organized some bands. Through the generations they had intermarried with neighbors, but identify culturally as Tuscarora.

During the War of 1812, British forces attacked Lewiston, New York on December 19, 1813. A band of Tuscarora living in a village on an escarpment just above the town assisted the town's residents as they fled the attacking force. The British force was accompanied by Mohawk warriors and some colonists disguised as Mohawks. The American militia fled, leaving only the Tuscarora—outnumbered 30 to one—to fight a delaying action that allowed some townspeople to escape. The Tuscarora sent a party of warriors to blow horns along the escarpment and suggest a larger force, while another party attacked downhill with war whoops, to give an exaggerated impression of their numbers. The attacking force burned Lewiston, as well as the Tuscarora village, both of which undefended.

The Tuscarora Nation has continued to struggle to protect its land in New York. In the mid-20th century, New York City commissioner Robert Moses generated controversy by negotiating with the Tuscarora Sachem council and purchasing 550 acres (220 ha) of the Tuscarora reservation for the reservoir of the new hydroelectric project along the Niagara River, downriver from Niagara Falls. (At the time of first power generation in February 1962, it was the largest project in the world.) The plant continues to generate electricity for households located from the Niagara area to as far away as New York City.

== Language ==
Skarure, the Tuscarora language, belongs to the northern branch of the Iroquoian languages. Linguists and historians have both tried to determine when the Iroquoian-speaking Meherrin and Nottoway tribes separated from the Tuscarora. Before initial contact (1650), English colonists, based on reports from Tsenacommacan natives, thought the three tribes were one people, as the Algonquian speakers referred to them by the exonym Mangoag. Following encounters between the English with the Tuscarora and other tribes, the former noted they used the same interpreters to translate with each of the peoples, which meant their languages were closely related.

Although the Nottoway language went extinct in the early 1900s, linguists have been able to determine that it was distinct, although closely related to Tuscarora. In addition, the Cheroenhaka (Nottoway) Tribe has been working to revitalize the Nottoway Language in recent times. In historic times, the three tribes always identified as distinct and independent peoples.

== Tuscarora today ==
=== Recognized Tuscarora nations ===
- Tuscarora Nation at Lewiston, New York
- Tuscarora First Nation at Six Nations of the Grand River, Ontario

=== Tuscarora descendants in Oklahoma ===
Some Tuscarora descendants are part of the Seneca–Cayuga Nation headquartered in Oklahoma. They are primarily descendants of Tuscarora groups absorbed in the early decades of the 19th century in Ohio by Senecas and Cayugas who also lived in the region. They became known to Europeans as Mingos, while in the Midwest, coalescing as a single group in Ohio after isolation from the League due to Sullivan's Expedition. They were later forced in Indian removals to Indian Territory in present-day Kansas, and lastly, in Oklahoma. In 1937, descendants reorganized and were federally recognized as the Seneca-Cayuga Tribe of Oklahoma. The nation occupies territory in the northeast corner of the former Indian Territory.

=== Unrecognized groups in North Carolina ===
Numerous unrecognized tribes in North Carolina claim Tuscarora descent. Beginning in the late 20th century, they have organized and reformed in various configurations. None have state recognition or federal recognition.

Tuscarora Nation officials in New York dispute claims that anyone in North Carolina has continuity as a tribe with the Tuscarora. In the spring of 1973 students from NC State University and members of the local Tuscarora people staged a protest seeking "federal and state recognition of the autonomous bands of the Tuscarora Nation of North Carolina, the right to run their own school systems, and better job opportunities for Native American communities." The protest involved a 100-mile (160 km) walk from Pembroke, North Carolina to the State Capitol in Raleigh.

The Tuscarora Nation of New York says that the great majority of the tribe moved north to New York. New York leaders consider any individuals remaining in North Carolina as no longer having tribal status, although they might have some Tuscarora ancestry. Researcher Andre Kearns states some descendants of the early free African-American Cumbo family later adopted Native American identity, self-identifying as Tuscarora.

== Notable historical Tuscarora ==
- Wallace "Mad Bear" Anderson (Tuscarora Nation, 1927–1985), Native activist
- David Cusick (Tuscarora Nation, circa 1780–1840), artist and author
- Dennis Cusick (Tuscarora Nation, circa 1800–1824), painter
- John Napoleon Brinton Hewitt (1859–1937), linguist and ethnographer
- Chief Hancock (c. 1670–1712), chief of the Lower Tuscarora Towns during the Tuscarora War
- Frank Mount Pleasant (Tuscarora Nation, 1884–1937), athlete
- Clinton Rickard (Tuscarora Nation, 1882–1971), Native activist
- Alicia Elliott (Six Nations Tuscarora, born 1987 or 1988), author

== See also ==
- Federal Power Commission v. Tuscarora Indian Nation
- Christoph von Graffenried
- Tuscarora First Nation
- Tuscarora Nation
