= Shakori people =

Extinct Indigenous people of North Carolina

Shakori
Shoccoree
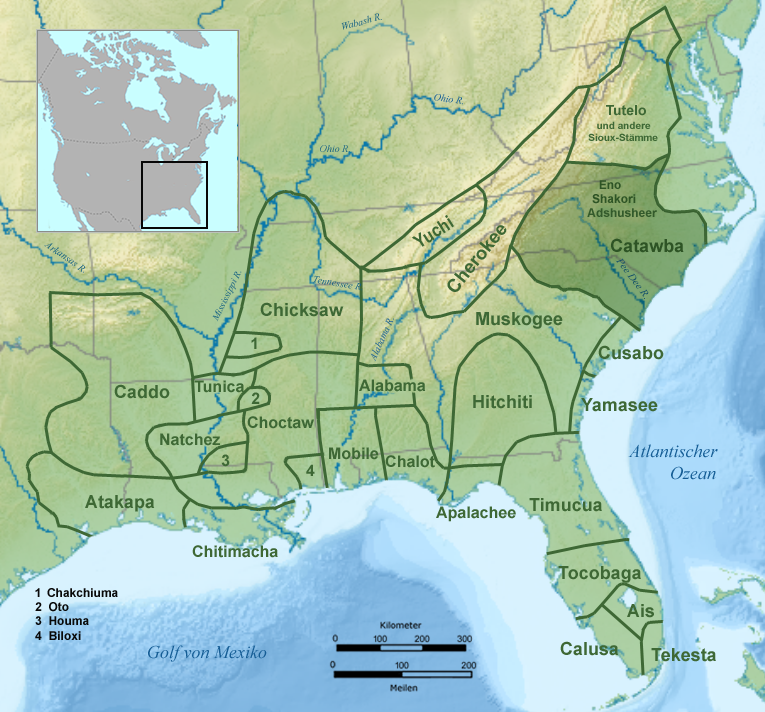
- Tribal territory of Eno-Shakori-Adshusheer during the late 17th century.

Total population
- Extinct; Assimilated into Catawba and Saponi.

Regions with significant populations
- Virginia, later Eno River and possibly Flat River in North Carolina Possibly Enoree River in South Carolina.

Languages
- Unclassified, thought to have spoken a distinct Shoccoree-Eno language.

Religion
- Native American religion

Related ethnic groups
- Eno, Catawba, Saponi

The Shakori people, also known as the Shoccoree, were an Indigenous people of the Southeastern Woodlands in the Piedmont region of present-day North Carolina. Originally a distinct tribal nation, by 1701 the Shakori, Eno, and Adshusheer confederated as the Shakori-Eno or Eno-Shakori and lived together in a single village along the Eno River, about fourteen miles east of the Occaneechi, near Hillsborough, North Carolina.

Modern academics consider the Shakori and Eno as a linguistically distinct group from nearby Siouan-Catawban speakers, citing their distinct customs, the absence of convincing Siouan-Catawban etymologies for their tribal names, and limited evidence that they spoke the unclassified Shoccoree-Eno language. They may instead have belonged to an otherwise unidentified ethnic and linguistic group, that predated the arrival of Siouans in the Piedmont.

== Name and synonymy ==
The name "Shoccoree" was adapted from plural forms "Shoccories" and "Schoccories" as recorded by John Lawson within A New Voyage to Carolina (1709). Based on analysis of their earliest recorded variants, linguist Blair A. Rudes concluded that these tribal names are probably not Catawban in origin. Variants include "Schockoores" (1651), "Cacores" (1654), and "Shackory-Indians" beside "Shakor" as a town name (1672). Shorter forms appear as "Shacioes" (1712), given as a synonym of Saxapahaws, and "Shacco", in the personal name of "Shacco-Will" (1733). The name was standardized as "Shakori" in the early 20th century by editor Frederick Webb Hodge, in an attempt to normalize John Lederer's historic rendering "Shackory-Indians".

Rudes has questioned proposed Catawban etymologies for Shoccoree and its later standardized form Shakori. Based on analysis of the earliest renderings of the name, he concluded that it probably does not originate from a Siouan or Catawban language.

== History ==
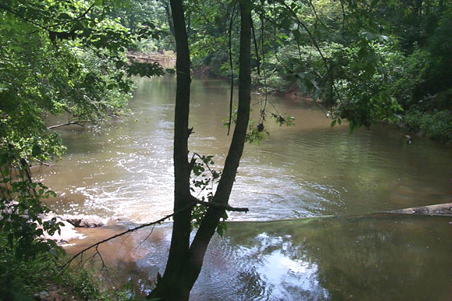
The Shakori, and the related Eno, lived along the banks of the Eno River in the vicinity of modern-day Hillsborough, North Carolina

Although their origins are uncertain, the Shakori were among the Catawban-speaking nations found in the Piedmont area of numerous southern states. They are believed to have joined against the English colonists in the Yamasee War. It is likely that by this time, they were already confederated or merged with remnants of other tribes, especially the Catawba. On February 27, 1714, the Virginia colony reached an agreement. Descendants with partial Shakori ancestry are likely among the Catawba and other regional groups, but the Shakori are extinct as a tribe.

== Culture ==
Little is known about the Shakori, at the time of contact. They made their wigwams and other structures out of interwoven saplings and sticks; these were covered in mud as opposed to the bark typically used by other nearby tribes. They were described as being similar to traditional dwellings of the Quapaw from Arkansas. In the center of the village, men often played a slinging stone game, probably similar to the chunkey played by tribes further south and west.

== Language ==
Shoccoree–Eno
- Native to: United States
- Region: Virginia, later Eno River and possibly Flat River in North Carolina
- Ethnicity: Shakori, Eno
- Extinct: after 1743
- Language family: unclassified

Language codes
- ISO 639-3: None (mis)
- Linguist List: 07s
- Glottolog: None
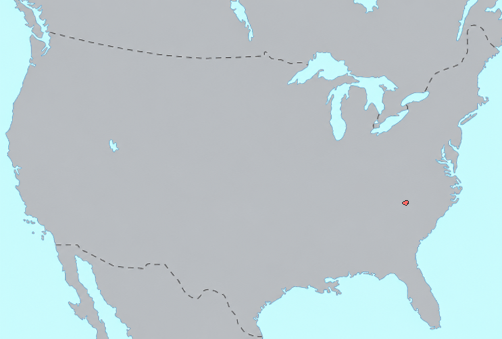
- Early 18th century distribution of Shoccoree-Eno near Eno River in North Carolina.

The Shoccoree-Eno language, also known as Shoccoree, is an extinct and unclassified indigenous language believed to have been spoken by the Shakori and Eno people in North Carolina. The language is attested by only a single word recorded by John Lawson in A New Voyage to Carolina. The Shakori, Eno, and Adshusheer were often mentioned together in early records and regarded as a single confederated group. As their populations declined they merged into larger Indigenous populations, including the Catawba and the Saponi in Virginia. Although their remnants merged into other tribes, a distinct Eno "dialect" survived as late as 1743 within the Catawba Indian Nation.

James Mooney considered the Shakori, Eno, and Adshusheer unlikely to have been Eastern Siouan speakers, noting that they differed culturally from neighboring Siouan peoples. However, because little to nothing of their languages survived and their known alliances were with Eastern Siouans, he grouped them amongst them within his 1894 work Siouan Tribes of the East. More recent anthropologists, including Charles M. Hudson, have noted that there is often no direct linguistic evidence for many of the historic groups surveyed by Mooney, highlighting that political alliances among Native peoples of the Southeast during the European colonization of the Americas, are poor indicators of their original linguistic affinities.

=== Vocabulary ===
There is only one attested word of the Shoccoree-Eno language, being Chenco (cf. Chunkey), a sport which the Shakori and Eno played. The term is the source of the word Chunkey in English. It has been suggested that Chenco may have originally been a loanword into Shoccoree, as the game was the most popular among Indigenous peoples of the Southeastern Woodlands, and similar terms are recorded across several Indigenous language families of the Americas.
