= Chunkey =

Native American game

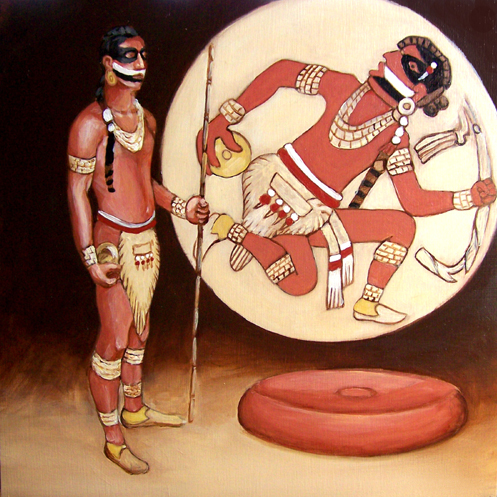
Illustration of a chunkey player (left) based on an ancient Mississippian gorget design (upper-right). The disk (lower-right) which could be carried in hand is not to scale. (Artist Herb Roe)

Chunkey (also known as chunky, chenco, tchung-kee, chunkee or the hoop and stick game) is a game of Native American origin. It was played by rolling disc-shaped stones across the ground and throwing spears at them in an attempt to land the spear as close to the stopped stone as possible. It originated around 600 CE in the Cahokia region of what is now the United States (near modern St. Louis, Missouri). Chunkey was played in huge arenas as large as 47 acres (19 ha) that housed great audiences designed to bring people of the region together (i.e. Cahokians, farmers, immigrants, and even visitors). Cahokians spread chunkey and other aspects of their culture into the South and Great Plains. They likely used this sport and the threat of force to enforce a region-wide peace, termed the "Pax Cahokiana". It continued to be played after the fall of the Mississippian culture around 1500 CE. Variations were played throughout North America. Early ethnographer James Adair translated the name to mean "running hard labor". Gambling was frequently connected with the game, with some players wagering everything they owned on the outcome of the game. Losers were even known to commit suicide.

== Name ==
The English word chunkey originates from chenco, a word from the extinct and unclassified Shoccoree-Eno language. It is the only attested word of this language, having been recorded by John Lawson within A New Voyage to Carolina. Lawson witnessed the game being played by the Shakori and Eno people in North Carolina, writing they were "much addicted to a Sport they call Chenco, which is carry'd on with a Staff and a Bowl made of Stone, which they trundle upon a smooth Place, like a Bowling-Green, made for that Purpose." Considering the game's continent-wide popularity, chenco may have been a loanword into Shoccoree-Eno from earlier Indigenous languages.

== Graphic representation ==
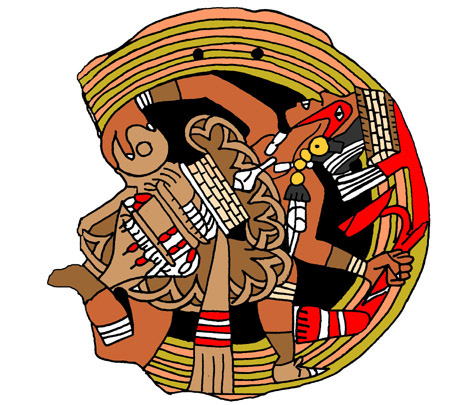
Chunkey player design taken from an engraved shell gorget, showing motifs

The falcon dancer/warrior/chunkey player was an important mythological figure from the Southeastern Ceremonial Complex. Many different representations of the theme have been found all over the American Southeast and Midwest. Throughout the many different centuries of its portrayal, certain distinct motifs are repeated:

- stance – Many graphic representations of the chunkey player show the participant in the act of tossing the stone roller.
- broken stick – The chunkey stick is usually shown as a stripped stick, almost always broken. In the mythological cycle, this may signify that the game is over, if not defeat itself. Chunkey sticks are usually not found in archaeological excavations, although a copper sheath found next to chunkey stones at Cahokias Mound 72 may be an exception.
- pillbox hat – A cylindral shaped hat composed of unknown materials, only seen on chunkey players.
- heart/bellows shaped apron – Archaeologists theorize that this may be the graphic representation of a human scalp attached to the belt of the figure. This motif seems to echo the beaded forelock, hair style (head shaved except for top-knot) and other attachments (shell, stone and copper ornaments) usually worn by mythological figures on their heads.
- Mangum Flounce – An oddly shaped motif consisting of looping lines hanging above and below the belt of the chunkey player. Named for a Mississippian copper plate found at the Mangum Mound Site in Claiborne County, Mississippi which includes the motif.

Although the figure described as the falcon dancer/warrior/chunkey player is not always shown in the act of playing chunkey, the placing of many of the motifs helps identify them as the same figure. Some motifs usually associated with the figure, such as the scalp, severed heads, broken chunkey sticks, and the ethnohistoric record associating it with gambling, seem to indicate the seriousness of the game. The price of defeat in the mythological record may have been the forfeiture of one's life and head.

== Post-European contact ==
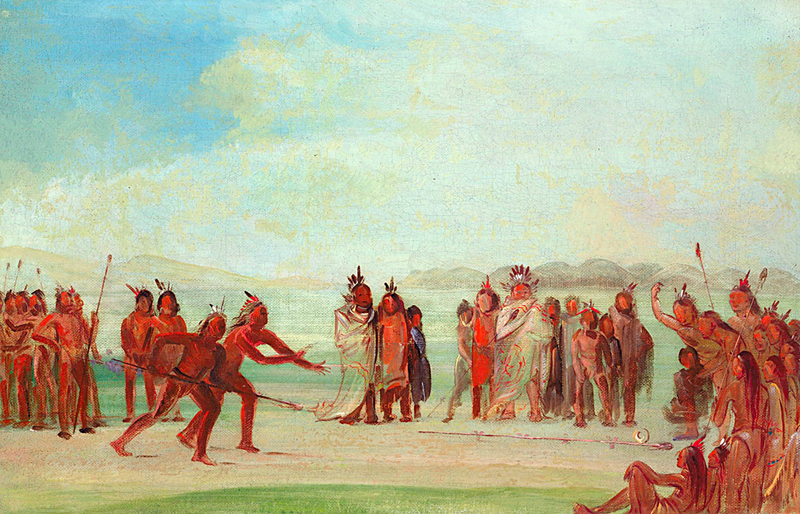
"Tchung-kee, a Mandan Game Played with a Ring and Pole" by artist George Catlin

Many Native Americans continued playing the chunkey game long after European contact, including the Muscogee (Creeks), Chickasaw, Choctaw, and the Mandans, as witnessed by the artist George Catlin in 1832,

The game of Tchung-kee [is] a beautiful athletic exercise, which the Mandan seem to be almost unceasingly practicing whilst the weather is fair, and they have nothing else of moment to demand their attention. This game is decidedly their favourite amusement, and is played near to the village on a pavement of clay, which has been used for that purpose until it has become as smooth and hard as a floor. ... The play commences with two (one from each party), who start off upon a trot, abreast of each other, and one of them rolls in advance of them, on the pavement, a little ring of two or three inches in diameter, cut out of a stone; and each one follows it up with his 'tchung-kee' (a stick of six feet in length, with little bits of leather projecting from its sides of an inch or more in length), which he throws before him as he runs, sliding it along upon the ground after the ring, endeavouring to place it in such a position when it stops, that the ring may fall upon it, and receive one of the little projections of leather through it.

— George Catlin, 1832

In the early colonial era, it was still the most popular game among American Indians of the Southeast. Muscogee chunkey yards were a large carefully cleared and leveled area, surrounded by embankments on either side, with a pole in the center, and possibly two more at either end. The poles were used for playing another indigenous game – stickball. The stones, valuable objects in themselves, were owned by the town or clans, not by individuals, and would be carefully preserved.

- Cherokees scored their game in terms of how close the stone was to certain marks on the chunkey stick.
- Chickasaws scored their game with a point for the person nearest the disc, two if it was touching the disc.
- Choctaws played their game on a yard 12 feet (3.7 m) wide by 100 feet (30 m) in length. Poles were made of hickory wood, with four notches on the front end, one in the middle, and two at the other end. The score depended on which set of notches was closest to the disc. The game ended when a player had reached twelve points.

== Revival ==
The Cherokee revived the game of chunkey in the 2010s, and play a small season which ends with a championship at the annual Cherokee Holiday games.

== Gallery ==
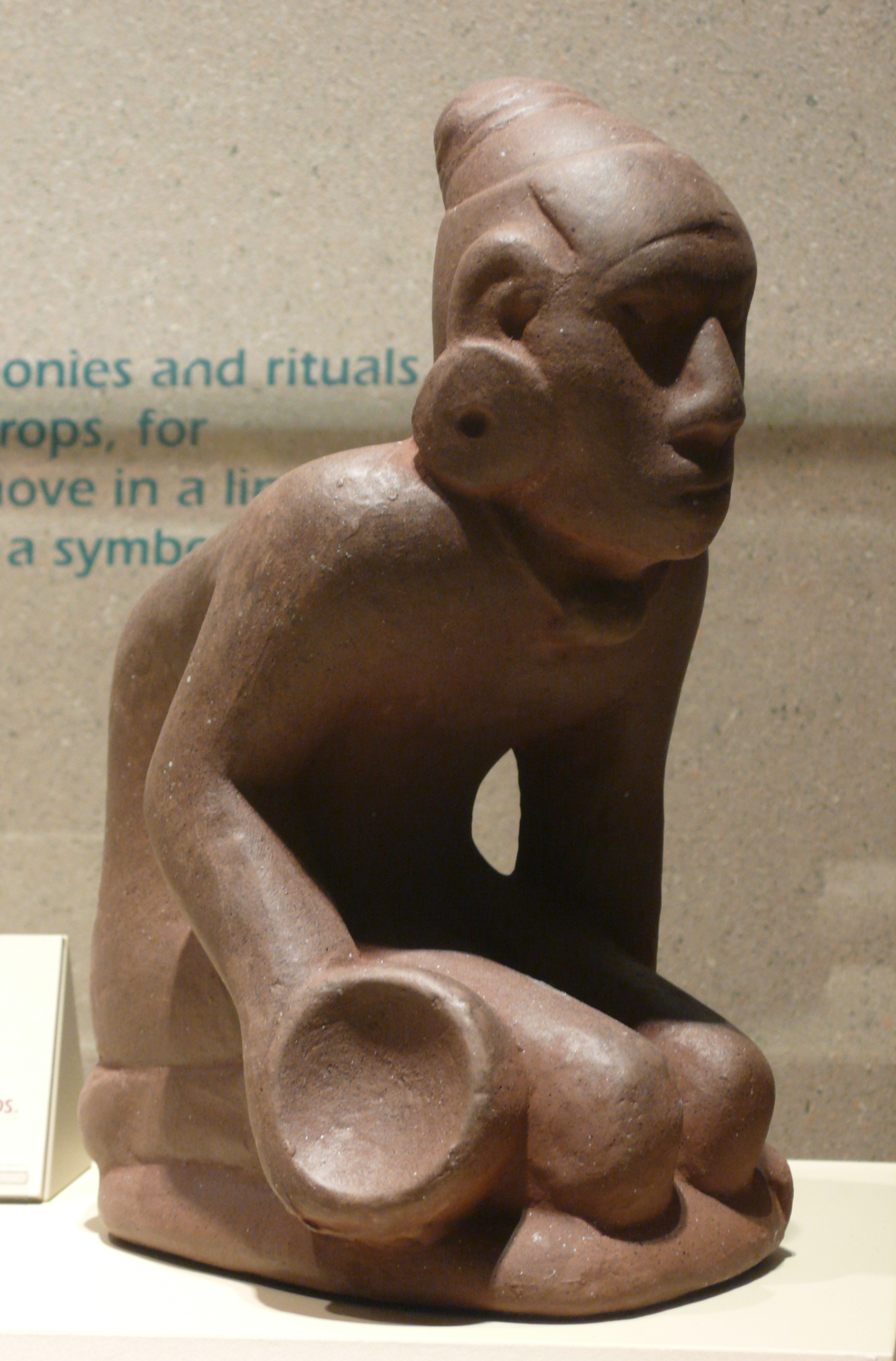
Chunkey player flint clay figurine from Cahokia

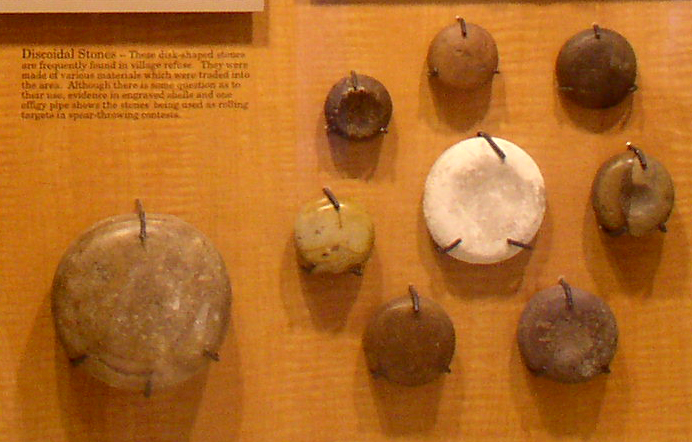
Stone discoidals found at the Plaquemine Mississippian Winterville site

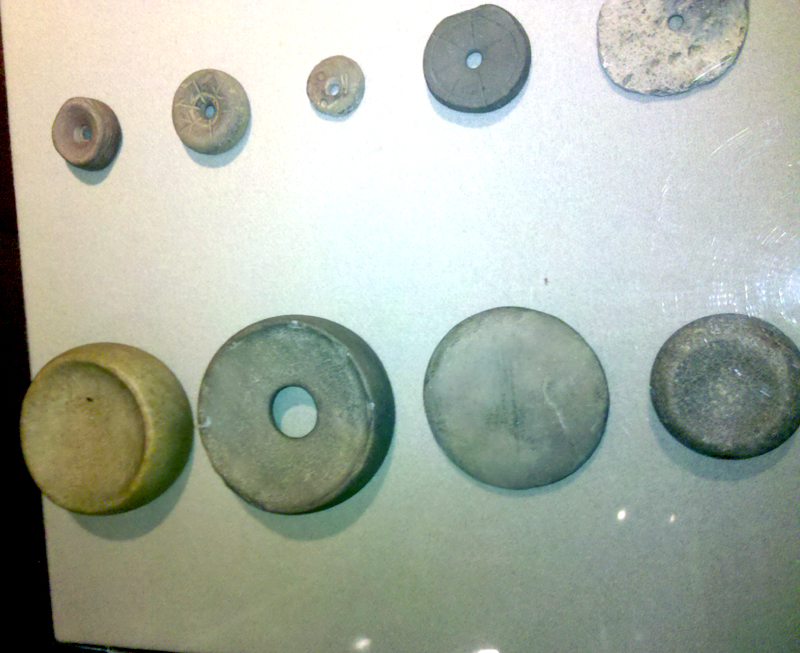
Discoidals found at Fort Ancient sites on display at the Southern Ohio Museum and Cultural Center in Portsmouth, Ohio

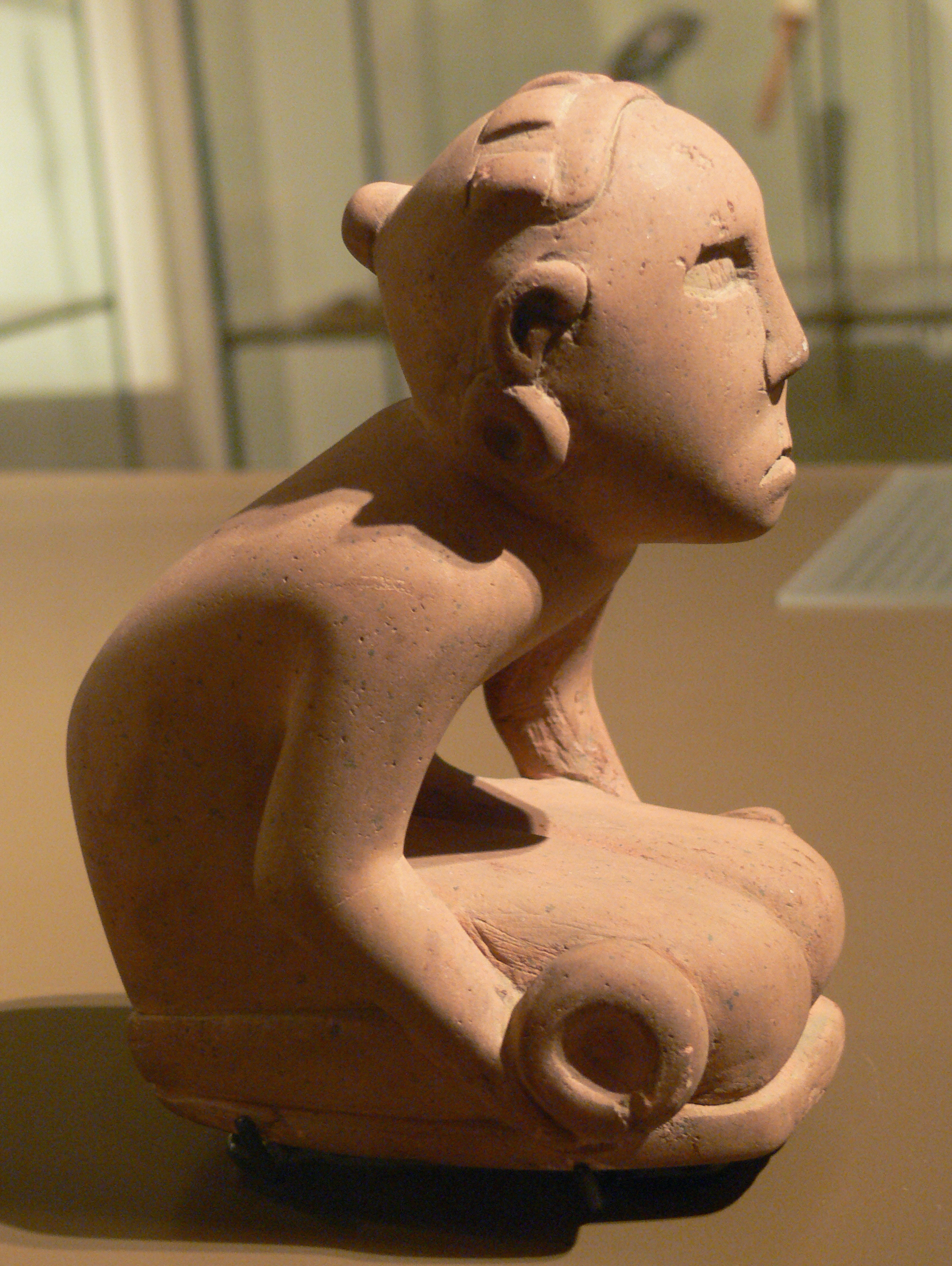
Effigy pipe from Fulton County, Georgia

== See also ==
- Hoop rolling
