= Kullihoma Grounds =

- Location within Oklahoma
- Location: 13078 CR 3680, Allen, OK, 74825
- Coordinates: 34°42′39.983″N 96°24′21.461″W
- Established: 1936

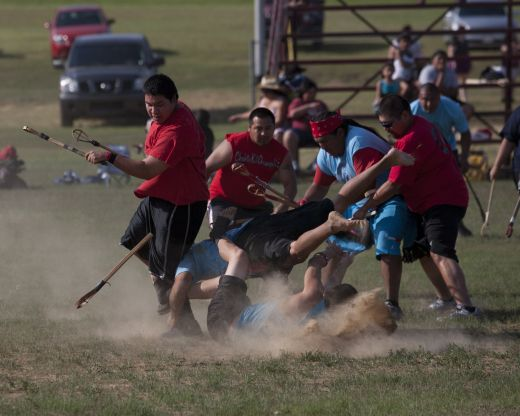
Stickball tournament at Kullihoma Grounds

Kullihoma Grounds consists of 1,500 acres (6,100,000 m^{2}) owned by the Chickasaw Nation, located 10 miles (16 km) east of Ada, Oklahoma. The land was purchased in 1936, and the Chickasaw built replicas of historic tribal dwellings on the site and uses it as a stomp ground. Historically, Chickasaw housing consisted of summer and winter houses and corn cribs. The tribe also built a council house on the site.

From Indian Removal to 1936, Chickasaw people held an annual Green Corn Ceremony on this land.

Choctaw and Chickasaw people use the ground for cultural celebrations, such as stomp dances, stickball tournaments, and the annual Chikasha Ittafama, or Chickasaw Reunion. (Note: The reunion is also open to the public and features cornstalk shoot competitions, horseshoes, chunkey, art and cultural demonstrations. It is scheduled in early May.) The game of chunkey, which had been played by Eastern Woodlands tribes and Plains tribes long before European and African contract, was reintroduced at the Chickasaw Reunion.

== See also ==
- Chunkey
- Indigenous North American stickball
- Stomp dance
