= Choctaw stickball =

- Highest governing body: Mississippi Band of Choctaw Indians; Choctaw Nation of Oklahoma
- Nicknames: Kabotcha Toli, Ishtaboli, "Little Brother of War"
- First played: at least the 17th century, Southeastern United States

Characteristics
- Contact: Full contact
- Team members: Variable; modern tournaments use 10-30 players per side
- Type: Indigenous stickball
- Equipment: Hand-stitched leather towa
- Venue: Open field with a single goalpost at each end

Choctaw stickball, known in the Choctaw language as kapucha toli or ishtaboli ("little brother of war"), is a traditional Native American field game played by the Choctaw people of the Southeastern United States. It is one of the oldest organized team sports in North America. Players use a pair of handcrafted wooden sticks to pick up, carry and shoot a small leather ball at a single tall goalpost at each end of the field. Hands may not touch the ball at any point in play.

The earliest written record dates from 1729, when a Jesuit missionary in the southeastern homelands described a Choctaw match. Older Choctaw tradition treated the game as a way of settling disputes between rival towns. Some matches were played between rival nations. Hundreds of players took the field on each side, and play could go on for whole days.

Today the game runs as a regulated tournament sport under the Mississippi Band of Choctaw Indians (MBCI) and the Choctaw Nation of Oklahoma. The flagship event is the World Series of Stickball, played every July at the Choctaw Indian Fair in Pearl River, Mississippi. It has run every summer since 1975 and draws around 50 teams.

== Names ==
The game has several Choctaw names. Kapucha toli literally combines kapucha ("stick") with toli (the verb "to play"). The phrase ishtaboli is the older ceremonial term, sometimes translated as "little brother of war". European observers in the 18th and 19th centuries used the descriptive English label "ball play".

== History ==
Choctaw oral tradition treats stickball as as old as the Choctaw people themselves. The first European-language description appeared in 1729, when a Jesuit missionary watched and wrote about a match in what is today Mississippi or Alabama. Eighteenth- and nineteenth-century observers reported that town-versus-town matches could run sunrise to sunset. Player numbers ran into the hundreds. The boundaries of the field were loosely set. Choctaw chiefs, along with the chiefs of neighbouring Muscogee and Chickasaw towns, also used the game to decide territorial and political disputes that might otherwise have gone to open warfare. That diplomatic role is the source of the older Choctaw nickname for the game.

George Catlin sat in on a major Choctaw stickball match in Indian Territory in 1834 and made an oil sketch on the spot. He later reworked the scene as Ball-play of the Choctaw - Ball Up between 1846 and 1850. That second canvas, now in the Smithsonian American Art Museum, is the most reproduced visual record of the pre-reservation game.

Half a century later, the Bureau of American Ethnology ethnographer James Mooney published a detailed account of the related Cherokee form of the game in The American Anthropologist in April 1890. Mooney's line that "almost everything short of murder is allowable in the game" has shaped its reputation in mainstream sports writing ever since.

American Indian boarding schools discouraged or outright banned traditional games in the late 19th and early 20th centuries. Removing native sports was part of the wider cultural assimilation policy of the era. Stickball survived in private community matches but largely disappeared from public Choctaw life until after the Indian Reorganization Act of 1934. The first organized stickball tournaments at the Choctaw Indian Fair were exhibitions, beginning with the inaugural fair in 1949. A competitive bracketed format, the World Series of Stickball, was added in 1975 and has run every year since. The Choctaw Nation of Oklahoma reformed its own official team in 2009 and now sends multiple sides to the Mississippi World Series every summer.

== Rules and equipment ==
A modern Choctaw stickball field is roughly the size of an American football field, with a single goalpost at each end. The goalpost (fabvssa) is a four-inch-square wooden pole standing 12 to 14 feet high. A team scores by striking the pole with the ball, which has to be carried or thrown by the sticks at all times.

Each player carries two sticks (kapucha), traditionally cut from a single piece of hickory sapling. The ends are thinned, steamed and bent over to form a small cup, and a webbing of leather lacing or deer hide holds the ball in place. The Encyclopedia of Alabama notes that Choctaw sticks stand out from those of other tribes by having handles with a square or rectangular cross section, and cups that flare outward toward the front. The ball (towa) is hand-stitched from small pieces of leather around a tightly bound core. Modern tournament balls are roughly the size of a small fist.

Hands must never touch the ball during play. Players may scoop, carry, pass and shoot using only the cupped ends of the two sticks held in opposite hands. Body contact is permitted, and matches are notoriously physical. The 19th-century characterization of the game as the "little brother of war" reflects its full-contact character as much as its diplomatic role.

== Cultural significance ==
Stickball has been described by Choctaw cultural leaders as a ceremonial activity as much as a sport, with pre-game prayers, songs and ritual treatments of the ball and sticks. In traditional matches the spectators bet personal property on the outcome. Women had a recognized organizational role in match-day ceremonies that included songs and dance around the goalposts.

The Mississippi Free Press has described the World Series of Stickball as "the most visible expression of living Choctaw culture in the United States today", staged alongside the crowning of the Choctaw Indian Princess at the Choctaw Indian Fair. Mississippi Today has likewise called the game "the granddaddy of all American sports" in its coverage of the World Series.

== Modern game ==
The annual World Series of Stickball, hosted by the Mississippi Band of Choctaw Indians at Pearl River since 1975, is the central event in the modern calendar. The tournament uses single-elimination brackets across five divisions: Pushmataha (boys 10-13), Tulli Okchi Ishko (boys 14-17), women, open men, and men 35 and over. About 50 teams enter each year.

The Choctaw Nation of Oklahoma has fielded official teams in the World Series since 2009. Stickball is also played by other Five Civilized Tribes including the Cherokee, the Chickasaw and the Muscogee, who maintain related but distinct forms of the game. A 2026 RTÉ News feature ahead of the Choctaw Nation's diplomatic visit to Ireland described the World Series as "once suppressed, now celebrated", noting that the game's revival has paralleled the wider resurgence of Choctaw language and ceremonial life since the 1970s.

== See also ==
- Stickball
- Lacrosse
- Choctaw
- Choctaw Indian Fair
- Mississippi Band of Choctaw Indians
- Choctaw Nation of Oklahoma
- American Indian boarding schools
