= Indigenous North American stickball =

Team sport in North America

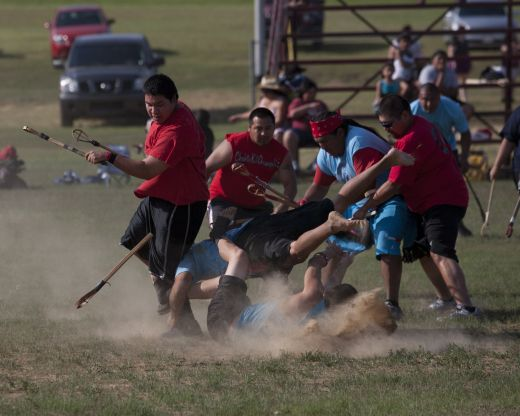
- Stickball tournament on the Kullihoma Grounds
- First played: Before 18th century

Characteristics
- Type: Team sports, stick sport, ball sport

Presence
- Country or region: North America
- World Championships: Choctaw Indian Fair World Series

Indigenous North American stickball is a team sport typically played on an open field where teams of players with two sticks each attempt to control and shoot a ball at the opposing team's goal. It shares similarities to the game of lacrosse. In Choctaw Stickball, "Opposing teams use handcrafted sticks, or kabocha, and a woven leather ball, or towa. Each team tries to advance the ball down the field to the other team's goalpost using only their sticks, never touching or throwing the ball with their hands. Points are scored when a player hits the opposing team's goalpost with the ball."

Several Native American tribes such as the Cherokee, Chickasaw, Choctaw, Muscogee, Seminole and Yuchi play the sport. Tribe elders organized games of stickball to settle disputes nonviolently.

The game of lacrosse is a tradition belonging to tribes of the Northern United States and Canada; stickball, on the other hand, continues in Oklahoma and parts of the Southeastern U.S. where the game originated. Although the first recorded writing on the topic of stickball was not until the mid-18th century, there is evidence that the game had been developed and played hundreds of years before that.

== History ==
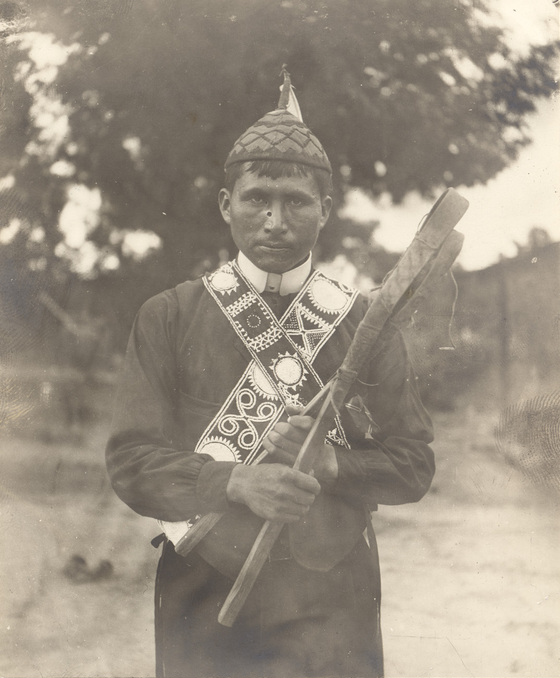
Jim Tubby, Mississippi Choctaw, preparing for a stickball game in 1908.

Traditional stickball games were sometimes major events that could last several days. As many as 100 to 1,000 men from opposing villages or tribes would participate. The games were played in open plains located between the two villages, and the goals could range from 500 yards (460 m) to several miles apart. Rules for these games were decided on the day before. Generally, there was no out-of-bounds, and the ball could not be touched with the hands. The goals would be selected as large rocks or trees; in later years wooden posts were used. Playing time was often from sun up until sundown.

The game began with the ball being tossed into the air and the two sides rushing to catch it. Because of the large number of players involved, these games generally tended to involve a huge mob of players swarming the ball and slowly moving across the field. Passing the ball was thought of as a trick, and it was seen as cowardly to dodge an opponent. Medicine men acted as coaches, and the women of the tribe were usually limited to serving refreshments to the players and betting on the sidelines.

The historical game played a huge role in the peace kept between tribes who played it. The game was not only used as a way to settle disputes and grievances among the many tribes but was also played to toughen young warriors for combat, for recreation, as part of festivals, and for the bets involved. Often before the game was even played terms would be set and agreed upon and the losing team would have no choice but to accept the outcome. If a tribe did not accept the terms of the game, the dispute often would end in battle.

Although the entire historical timeline of the game is only fragmentary, there have been several documented games throughout history that have not only impacted the tribes but the nation as a whole. In the mid-17th century, a Jesuit missionary named Jean de Brébeuf was the first to write about the Native American game after witnessing Wendat people play. Even though he condemned the game due to its violence, many English colonists were captivated by it and began playing the game themselves.

In 1763, the Ottawa tribe used a game of stickball to gain entrance into Fort Michilimackinac. Under the direction of the chief of the Ottawas, Chief Pontiac, war chief Minweweh invited soldiers from the fort to watch a game in honor of the king's birthday. While the soldiers enjoyed the festivities and entertainment, the Ottawa players moved close enough to rush the fort and massacre them.

In 1834, after the Caughnawaga Indians demonstrated a game of stickball in Montreal, Canada, many Canadians took interest in the game. In 1856, William George Beers codified the aboriginal game into modern lacrosse.

It was not until around the mid- to late-20th century that stickball began to see a revival across the southern region of North America. Meanwhile, the game became a street game in the Northeastern United States.

=== Tribal teams ===
Though the size of the game may have dwindled over the years, "the game played today is not that different from the historical version."

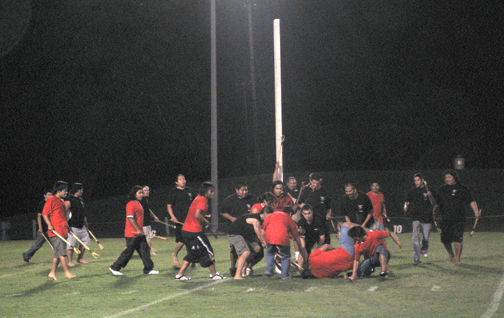
Stickball match at Cherokee National Holiday, Tahlequah, Oklahoma, 2007

Much like the game of the tribal ancestors, today stickball is bringing tribal people and communities together in schoolyards and college campuses across the southern states. Many of the southeastern tribes in the U.S. are beginning to see more games being played at tribal festivals and tournaments. The modern game of stickball is, in fact, experiencing such a resurgence that several tribal tournaments are being held annually across the nation, such as the Jim Thorpe Games and the Choctaw Labor Day Festival. The World Series, hosted by the Mississippi band of Choctaws in Philadelphia, Mississippi, is "arguably the biggest, most hotly contested Indigenous ballgame in the country."

The game today is played on a field roughly about one hundred yards with a tall cylindrical pole or set of poles at each end of the field for goals. Points are scored by hitting the pole with the ball or game sticks while holding the ball or running through the set of poles with the ball. In recreational games, scoring is loosely kept, most times by the audience or a few players.

Historically and presently every game begins with a jump ball thrown into the middle of the field, groups of players from each team scramble and fight to get the ball and launch it towards their goal with their sticks. The beginning of the game has been described as "rolling and tumbling over each other in the dust, straining and tugging for possession of the ball."

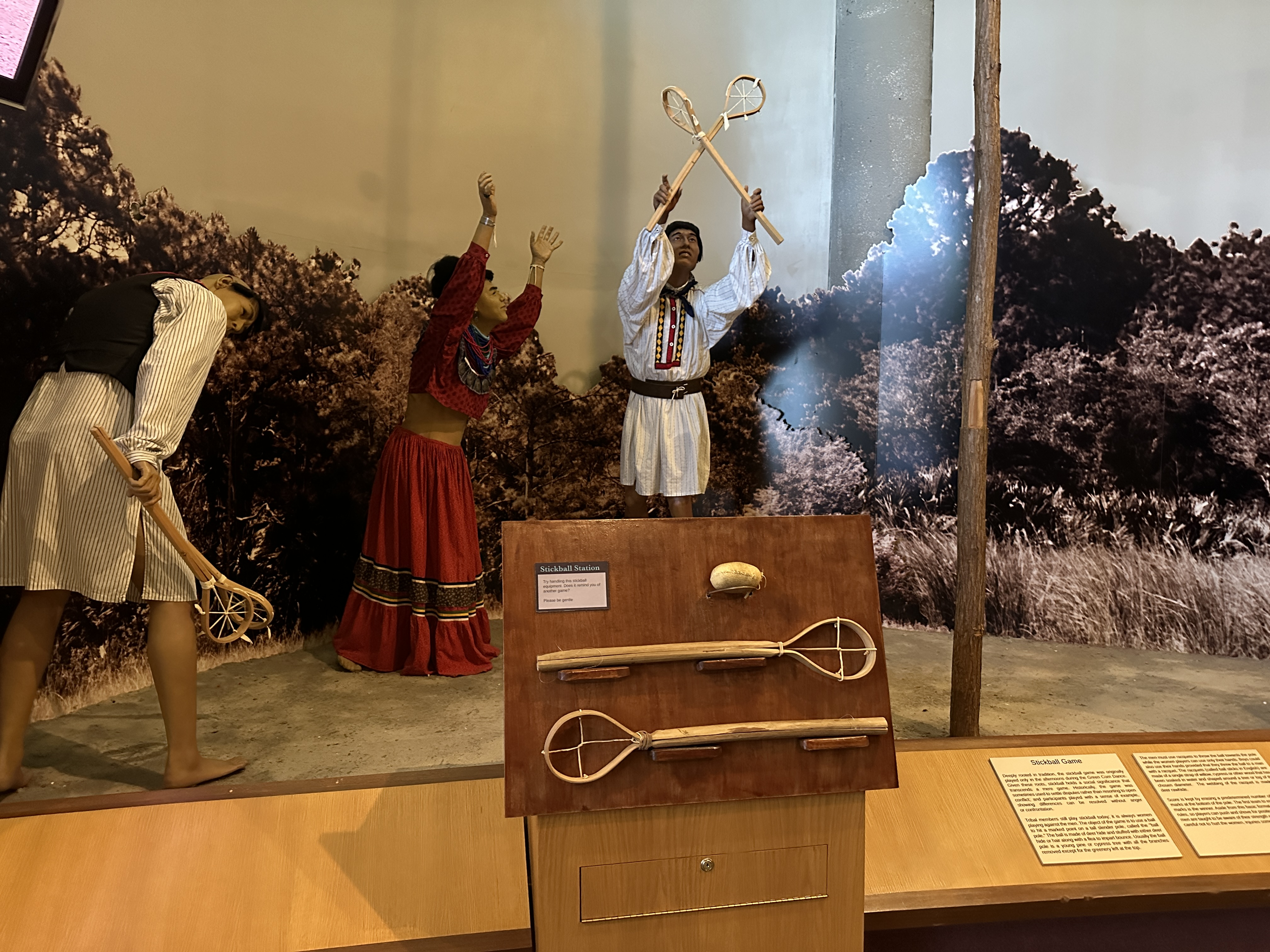
Exhibit at the Ah-Tah-Thi-Ki Museum on the Big Cypress Reservation in Florida

Although the number of players participating in the game is somewhat unimportant, the number of players from each team on the field must be equal and is normally about thirty from each team. In many games the players are split into three groups on the field. One group or the "pole men" guard their own goal to prevent the other team from scoring. The second group is placed in the middle of the field and is responsible for moving the ball down the field towards the goal to score points, and the third group or "returners" are gathered around the opponent's pole to help their team score points on the opposing team's pole. Due to the nature of the game and the number of players trying to retrieve one ball, injuries are unavoidable.

Stickball is and always has been a full-contact sport played without protective padding, helmets, and in most cases without shoes. The earlier game had very few rules and because the game was often used as an alternative to war, fatalities did occur. Today stickball injuries are common, however, there are rules in place to prevent players from being seriously injured. A few of the most common rules include no touching the ball, no swinging sticks at other players, no hitting below the knees, and the only player that can be tackled is the one in possession of the ball and the player doing the tackling must drop his sticks first.

In contemporary stickball games, it is not unusual to see women playing. Female stickball players are the only players on the field who are not required to use sticks and are allowed to pick up the ball with their hands, while men are always required to play with a pair of stickball sticks. Teams are usually split into men vs. women for social games. The men will suffer some sort of penalty or disqualification for being too aggressive towards female players, but the women have no such restrictions on their methods of playing.

== Pre-game rituals ==
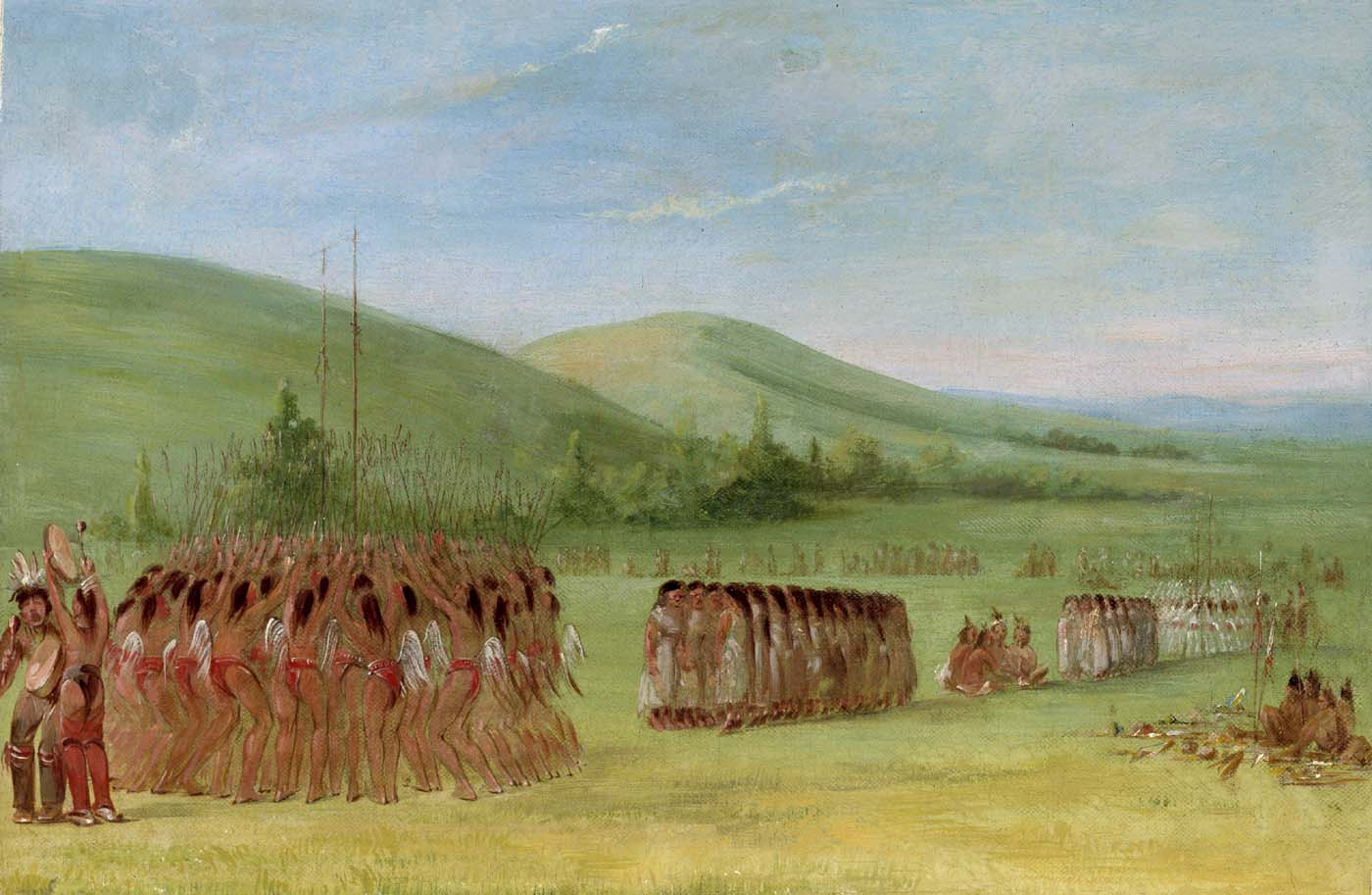
"Ball-play Dance" by George Catlin, 1834. Before the match, players and their supporters passed the night in singing, dancing, and soliciting divine support.

Pre-game rituals were very similar to rituals associated with war. The night before the game was to be played a tribal ball dance was held in which most of the community would take part. The dances consisted of conjuring ceremonies and spiritual songs and practices that were believed to bring good luck to the team. The players wore ceremonial regalia, sacrifices were held, and sacred expressions were yelled to intimidate opponents.

The medicine man performed rituals to prepare players and their sticks. One by one the shaman would take each player away from the dance to perform the "mystic rite known as going to the water" at which time the shaman blesses the game and each player receives ritualistic scratches that were said to "cause the blood to flow more freely" during the game, assuring a win for the team. In many instances, winning the game meant winning a dispute with another tribe or community.

Players decorated their bodies with paint and charcoal and their sticks or stick racks with objects representing qualities desired in the game. In addition to athletic training, strict taboos were held on what players could eat before a game. Players would fast and be banned from eating certain foods in hopes that the absence of this food would mentally, spiritually, and physically enhance the player's capability to move the team towards a win in the game.

On the day of the game, teams walked to the field and were slowed by constant rituals. Before the game, every player was required to place a wager. Items such as handkerchiefs, knives, trinkets, horses, and even wives and children would be at stake. The bets would be displayed on a rack near the spectators, and items would be awarded proportionally to the winner of each quarter. When the game was over another ceremonial dance took place, along with a large feast for the hungry players.

In the summer of 1892, we were near Keokuk Falls on North Canadian River and we learned that a ball game was to be staged between the Tulsa and the Theowalthioa Indians so we waited and watched their preparations. The two tribes moved in three days before the game (which was nothing more nor less than a battle) was to take place.

One tribe camped directly south of the other with a strip of land between them, This strip of land was strictly guarded by Indian Braves on horseback. These were from both tribes. There was no passing between the two tribes but they would howl and bark at one another day and night.

The braves who were to take part in the game made themselves ready by taking medicine, which they called Spanish Tea. This was made of the bark of red-oak trees. They did not eat and slept little, doing everything in their power to work themselves into a fury of hate and rage - to make themselves fierce and mean was their object.

When the time came for the game, the squaws brought out to the grounds ponies loaded with everything that an Indian at that time could get. There were blankets, moccasins, food, beads. These ponies, blankets, moccasins, food, beads and other things were all to be put up as bets on the game. Many white men and negroes would also bet on the game. A big crowd was present. When the game started, it was wonderful to see — how the braves could handle the ball with their handmade clubs, but when the first fellow got the ball some player hit him over the head with a club, peeling the skin until it hung over his ear. As Soon as a player was knocked out, the squaws would carry him off the field, to a pool of water nearby where they would wash his wounds and restore him to consciousness, if possible.

The battle was so fierce, that when the game was ended and one side had been chased from the ground, the pool was perfectly bloody.

This was the last Indian ball game played in such a brutal manner for the Government took notice of such brutality and sent deputy marshals to the games to prevent such cruelty.

At this game I saw players bite one another.

— Frank Grall, Eyewitness account of Frank Grall from WPA interview of 1937, interviewed by Ethel B. Tackitt; Wewoka, Oklahoma, August 10, 1937

== Equipment ==
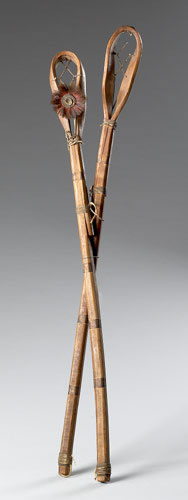
Choctaw Stickball Sticks

Depending on the tribe playing the game, stickball can be played with one or two wooden sticks made from tree trunks or saplings of hardwood such as hickory. The wood is thinned at one end and bent around and attached to the handle to form a loop that is bound with leather or electrical tape. Leather strips are stretched across the back of the loops on the sticks to form netting so the ball can be caught and held in the cup of the stick.

Some versions of stickball used unusual stick designs, for instance, in the St. Lawrence Valley a version was played in which the head took up two-thirds of the stick. In the Southwestern United States a double-stick version was played with sticks about two and a half feet long.

Many early stickball sticks were essentially giant wooden spoons with no netting. A more advanced type had one end bent into a 4- to 5-inch-diameter (130 mm) circle, which was filled with netting. This netting was made of wattup or deer sinew.

Many players decorate their playing sticks with hair from animals such as horses or raccoons hoping to match desirable qualities of that specific animal, such as speed or agility. Some sticks often had elaborate carvings on them intended to help players in the game. Sticks were so treasured that many players requested to be buried with their stick beside them.

Much like the sticks used in the game, the game ball is handmade from "tightly wadded cloth" and wrapped in a weaving of leather strips. Some early stickball balls were made out of wood. Others were made of deerskin stuffed with hair. They were typically three inches in diameter.

== See also ==
- Culture of the Choctaw
- First Nations Lacrosse Association
- Cork ball
- Gillidanda
- Half-rubber
- Vitilla
- Street cricket
- Apalachee § Ball game
