= Choctaw culture =

Culture of a Native American people originally from the Southeastern United States

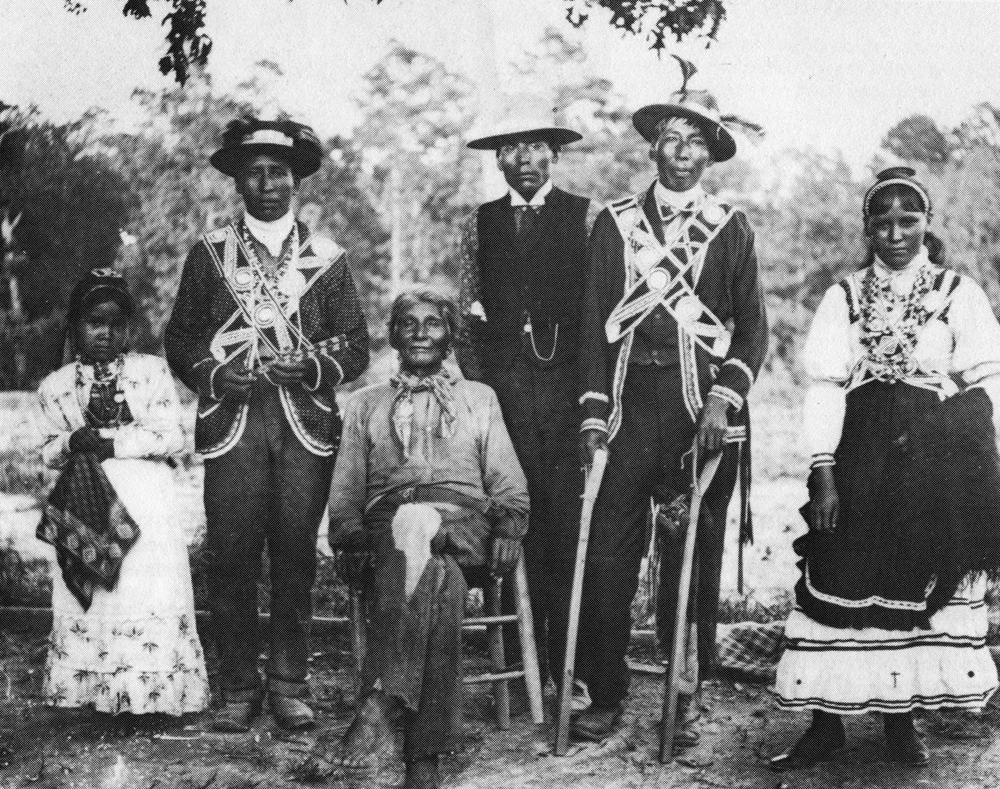
Mississippi Choctaws in traditional clothing, ca. 1908

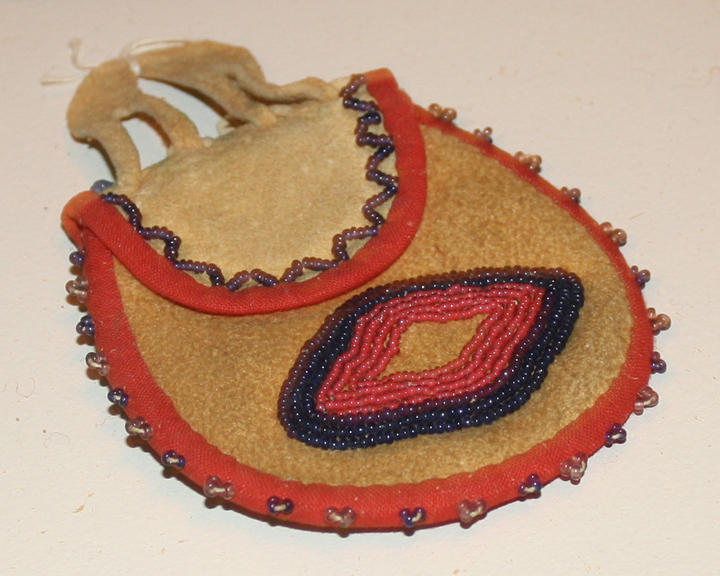
Choctaw beaded pouch, ca. 1900, Oklahoma, Oklahoma History Center

The culture of the Choctaw has greatly evolved over the centuries combining mostly European-American influences; however, interaction with Spain, France, and England greatly shaped it as well. The Choctaws, or Chahtas, are a Native American people originally from the Southeastern United States. They were known for their rapid incorporation of modernity, developing a written language, transitioning to yeoman farming methods, and having European-American and African Americans lifestyles enforced in their society. The Choctaw culture has its roots in the Mississippian culture era of the mound builders.

== Clans ==
Within the Choctaws were two distinct moieties: Imoklashas (elders) and Inhulalatas (youth). Each moiety had several clans or Iksas, it is estimated there were about 12 Iksas altogether. Identity was established first by Moiety and Iksa, so a Choctaw identified himself first as his Iksa, for example Imoklasha or Inhulata, and second as Choctaw. Children belonged to the Iksa of their mother meaning they are matrilineal. The following were some major districts:

- Okla Hannalli (people of six towns)
- Okla Tannap (people from the other side)
- Okla Fayala (people who are widely dispersed)

John Swanton writes "there are only the faintest traces of groups with truly totemic designations, the animal and plant names which occur seeming not to have had a totemic connotation." Swanton also adds 'Adam Hodgson ... who "spoke English very well," told ... "that there were tribes or families among the Indians, somewhat similar to the Scottish clans; such as, the Panther family, the Bird family, Raccoon Family, the Wolf family."' The following are possible totemic clan designations:

- Wind
- Bear
- Deer
- Wolf
- Panther
- Holly Leaf
- Bird
- Raccoon
- Crawfish

== Criminal justice ==
Murder was usually dealt with by revenge. Swanton writes, "Murder, i.e., intratribal man-killing, could be atoned for ordinarily only by the death of the murderer himself or some substitute acceptable to the injured family… they cherish a desire for revenge for a generation…"

Stolen property was usually punishable by returning the stolen goods or other compensation. Swanton says, "thieves apprehended with the stolen property in their possession were forced to return it. If they could not produce the property, either they or their families were compelled to return goods of equal value." Theft was later punishable by a whip. Swanton states of Cushman, "for minor offenses, whipping was the punishment; fifty lashes for the first offense, one hundred for the second, and death by the rifle for the third offense ... (1899)."

Incest was considered a crime. Swanton states, "incest ... was anciently a major crime, but we have no record of the punishments inflicted on account of it."

== Early religion ==
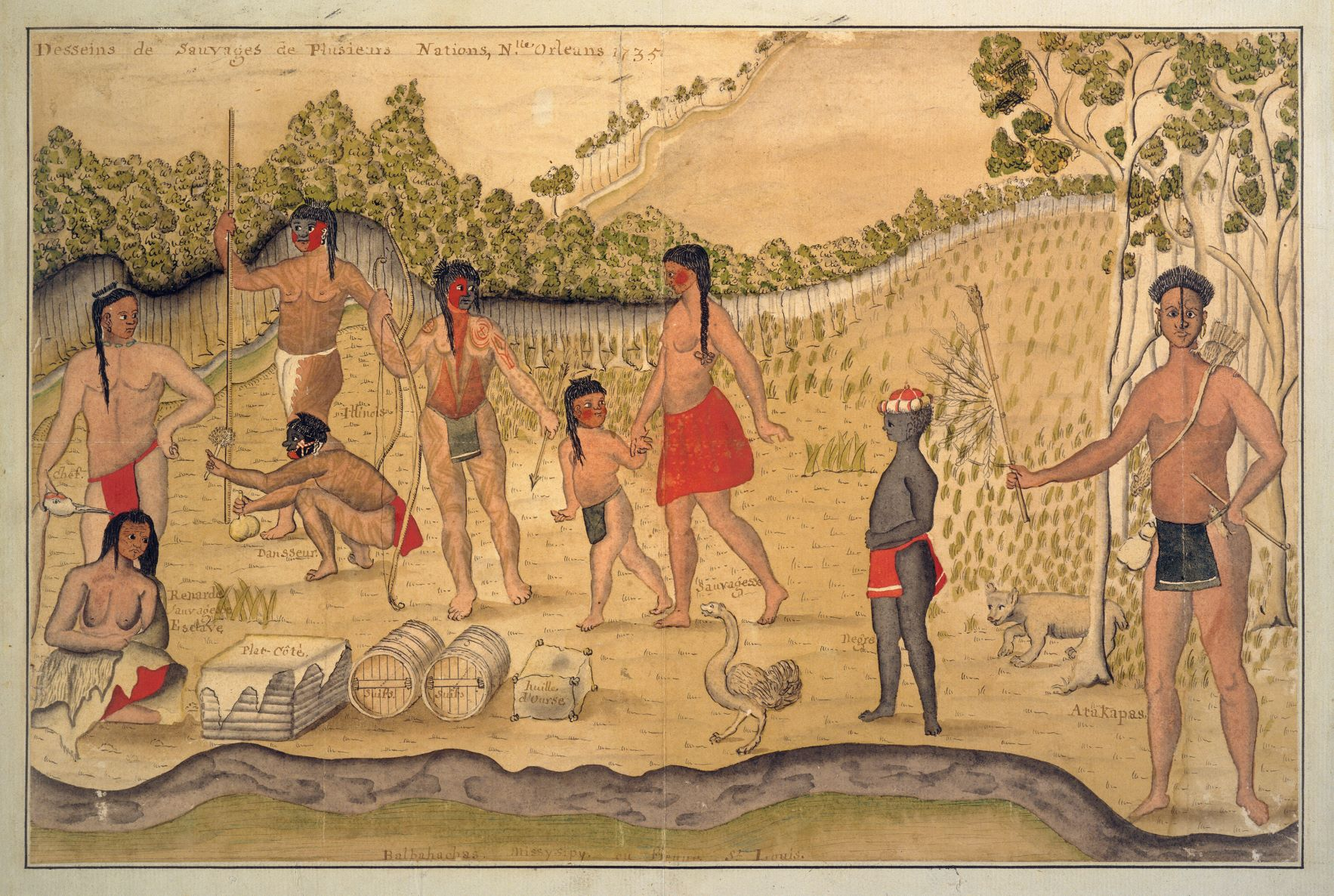
De Batz, 1735, watercolor paintings of southeastern and northern Indians and an African descendant child.

The Choctaws believed in a good spirit and an evil spirit, and they may have been sun, or Hushtahli, worshipers. Swanton writes, "the Choctaws anciently regarded the sun as a deity ... the sun was ascribed the power of life and death. He was represented as looking down upon the earth, and as long as he kept his flaming eye fixed on any one, the person was safe ... fire, as the most striking representation of the sun, was considered as possessing intelligence, and as acting in concert with the sun ... [having] constant intercourse with the sun ..." The word nanpisa (the one who sees) expresses the reverence the Choctaw had for the sun.

Anthropologists theorize that the Mississippian ancestors of the Choctaw placed the Sun at the center of their cosmological system. Mid-eighteenth-century Choctaws did view the sun as a being endowed with life. Choctaw diplomats, for example, spoke only on sunny days. If the day of a conference were cloudy or rainy, Choctaws delayed the meeting, usually on the pretext that they needed more time to discuss particulars, until the sun returned. The Sun made sure that all talks were honest. The Sun as a symbol of great power and reverence is a major component of southeastern Indian cultures.

— Greg O'Brien, Choctaws in a Revolutionary Age, 1750–1830

The evil spirit, or Na-lusa-chi-to ("black being" or "big black one") or Impashilup ("soul eater" or "ghost eater"), sought to harm people. It may appear, as told in stories, in the form of a shadow person.

Prayers may have been introduced by missionaries; however, Choctaw prophets were known to address the Sun. Swanton writes, "an old Choctaw informed Wright that, before the arrival of the missionaries, they had no conception of prayer. However, he adds, 'I have indeed heard it asserted by some, that anciently their hopaii, or prophets, on some occasions were accustomed to address the sun ...'"

== Mythology ==
The Choctaw have many stories about little people. Swanton states of Halbert, "the Choctaws in Mississippi say that there is a little man, about two feet high, that dwells in the thick woods and is solitary in his habits ... he often playfully throws sticks and stones at the people ... the Indian's doctors say that Bohpoli [thrower] assists them in the manufacture of their medicines ..." The little people are said to take young children to the forest to teach them how to be medicine men.

The will-o'-the-wisp was called "night-mare" by the Indians and was believed to plait up the tails of horses during the night and to ride them about until they could hardly be used next day and many died from the effects.

== Stories ==
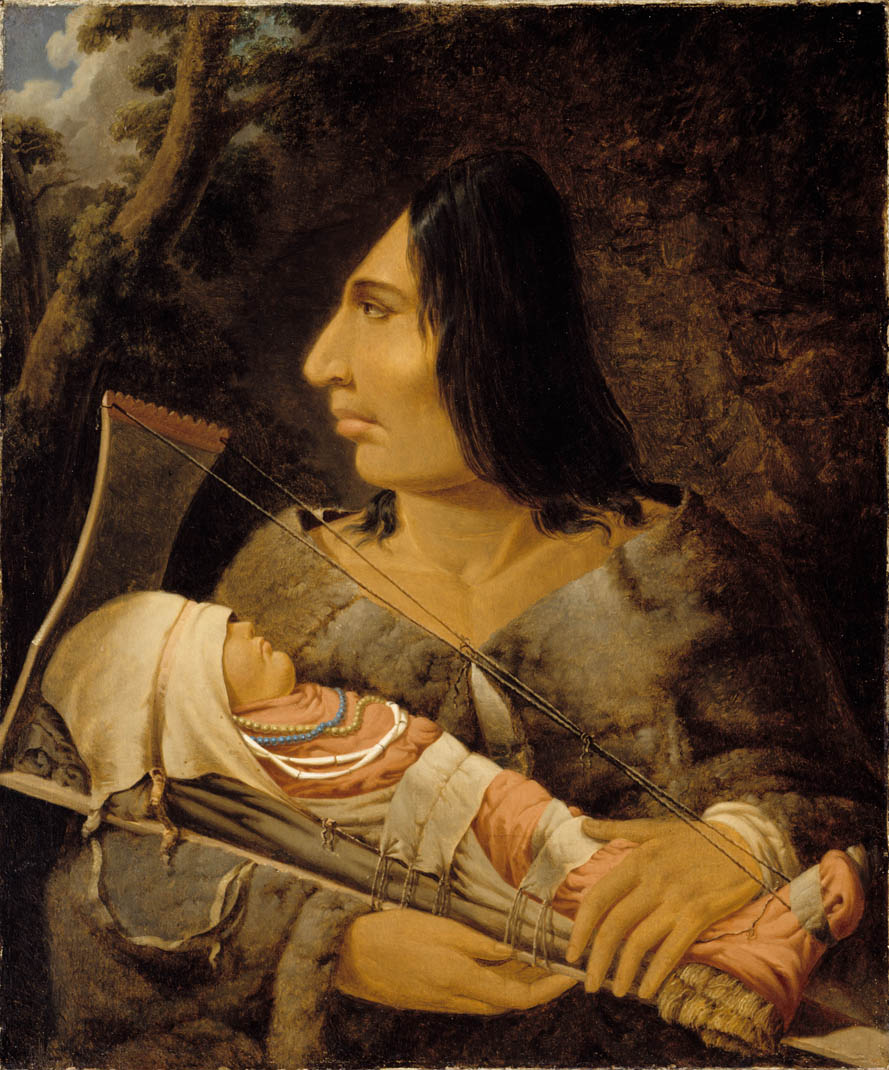
The Choctaw practiced Head Flattening, but it fell out of favor. This 1840s painting presents Chinookans, a Native American Northwestern tribe.

Storytelling is a popular part of entertainment and history in many Native American societies. In addition, many stories were used to convey important morals and values. This stood also true for the Choctaws. Stories would recount their origins and would retell the deeds of heroes long gone. There are also stories about possums, raccoons, turtles, birds, chipmunks, and wolves. Randy Jimmie and Leonard Jimmie state,

The Choctaw believed that their people came forth from the sacred mound of Nanih Waiya. In relation to this creation myth is the legend of the Choctaw tribe's migration under the leadership of Chata. Several versions of their creation and migration legends have been perpetuated by the Native Americans and remain very popular among contemporary Choctaws, especially the elderly. The young, however, have a more active interest in the mischievous deed of various forest animals or in stories about the creation of the wild forests.

— Randy and Leonard Jimmie

One such story of forest animals is about a possum and raccoon. Randy Jimmie and Leonard Jimmie tells,

A long time ago, when the animals of the woods could talk, there lived two brothers, Possum and Raccoon. One day these two animals were walking in the forest. Raccoon was jealous of Possum's long beautiful tail with its many colors. Raccoon had often thought of various ways to destroy his brother's tail, and on that particular day he told Possum that he knew a way to make his tail even more beautiful and longer. Possum asked Raccoon how he could do such a thing. Raccoon told Possum to go home and return in a few moons, and they would meet at that particular spot and discuss it further.

When a few moons elapsed, Possum returned to the designated place. After friendly greetings, the subject of the beautiful tail was brought to the attention of Raccoon. Of course, Raccoon remembered it. He told Possum to go with him into the woods, and they set out. They traveled a long trail before they came to a large hickory tree, whose top had been knocked off. There was a hole on one side of the old battered tree. Raccoon told Possum that this was the place where latter's tail would be made longer and more beautiful. He told Possum to stick his tail into the hole in the hickory tree. The Possum did as instructed, and soon Possum found himself being tied to the tree. He became angry and attempted to get away, but Raccoon convinced Possum that this was necessary to make his tail outstanding.

Once Raccoon had tied Possum to the tree, he went on the other side of it. Within a few minutes Possum began feeling pain and heat in his tail. After a while the pain and heat disappeared, and Raccoon returned and told Possum to wait a while longer. He would cut him loose upon his return. Possum waited and waited, but Raccoon did not return. Possum called for help and Squirrel showed up to set him free. When he pulled his tail out of the tree, Possum discovered it had been burned to a crisp. To this day the Choctaws believe that Raccoon burned Possum's tail because of envy and jealousy.

— Randy and Leonard Jimmie

== Ethnobotany ==
Pseudognaphalium obtusifolium ssp. obtusifolium is made into a decoction of leaves and blossoms and taken for lung pain and colds.

== Warfare ==
Choctaw warfare had many customs associated with it. Before war was declared a council was held to discuss the matter which would last about eight days. Swanton writes on Bossu's account, "The Chactas love war and have some good methods of making it. They never fight standing fixedly in one place; they flit about; they heap contempt upon their enemies without at the same time being braggarts, for when they come to grips they fight with much coolness ..." Superstition was a part of Choctaw warfare. Swanton says, "The Chactas are extremely superstitious. When they are about to go to war they consult their Manitou, which is carried by the chief. They always exhibit it on that side where they are going to march toward the enemy, the warriors standing guard about ..."

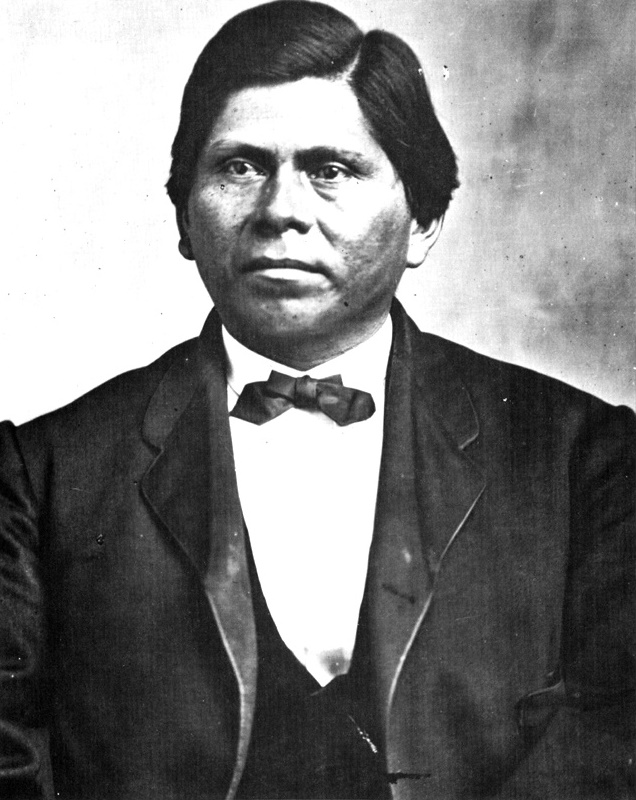
Allen Wright, a scholar who compiled a Choctaw dictionary, is credited with creating the state name Red People or Oklahoma. Wright attended Union Theological Seminary in New York City and obtained a Master of Arts in 1855, the first Native American in Indian Territory to do so.

When the Choctaw capture an enemy, he or she was displayed as a war trophy. Swanton writes of what Roman wrote, "they never exercised so much cruelty upon their captive enemies as the other savages; they almost always brought them home to shew them, and then dispatched them with a bullet or hatchet; after which, the body being cut into many parts, and all the hairy pieces of skin converted into scalps, the remainder is buried and the above trophies carried home, where the women dance with them till tired; then they are exposed on the tops of the hot houses till they are annihilated ..."

For some societies, the practice of decapitation was considered an honor. This practice seems to be true for the Choctaw of Oskelagna. A fallen Choctaw warrior's head was brought back after a battle. Swanton says of De Lusser (1730), "there was one who brought the head of one of their people who had been killed. He threw it at my feet telling me that he was a warrior who had lost his life for the French and that it was well to weep for his death ..."

== Language ==
The Choctaw language is a member of the Muskogean family. The language was well known among the frontiersmen, such as future U.S. President Andrew Jackson and William Henry Harrison, of the early 19th century. Others in this language family include: Creek, Seminole, Chickasaw, Koasati, Alabama, and Mikasuki. Language lost its retention with the Choctaws over time as more and more young Choctaws had to go through boarding schools. In the boarding schools Choctaws were forced to speak the English language making retention of their natural language extremely difficult. Even though there were boarding schools such as these that many Native Americans had to go through there were still Choctaw schools run by the Choctaw's themselves. With schools ran solely by the Choctaws some still retained the language though many of those schools became bilingual.

=== The alphabet ===
The written Choctaw language is based upon English characters and was developed in conjunction with the civilization program of the United States in the early 19th century. Although there are other variation of the Choctaw alphabet, the three most commonly seen are the Byington (Original), Byington/Swanton (Linguistic), and Modern.

=== Byington (Original) ===
The Choctaw Speller alphabet as found in the Chahta Holisso Ai Isht Ia Vmmona; this alphabet is the one maintained in usage by language educators from the Choctaw Nation of Oklahoma, created c. ~1800s.

=== Byington/Swanton (Linguistic) ===
The Choctaw linguistic alphabet as found in the Choctaw Language Dictionary by Cyrus Byington (Edited by John Swanton, 1909.

=== Modern ===
The Modern Choctaw alphabet as used by the Mississippi Band of Choctaw Indians, Present.

== Stickball ==
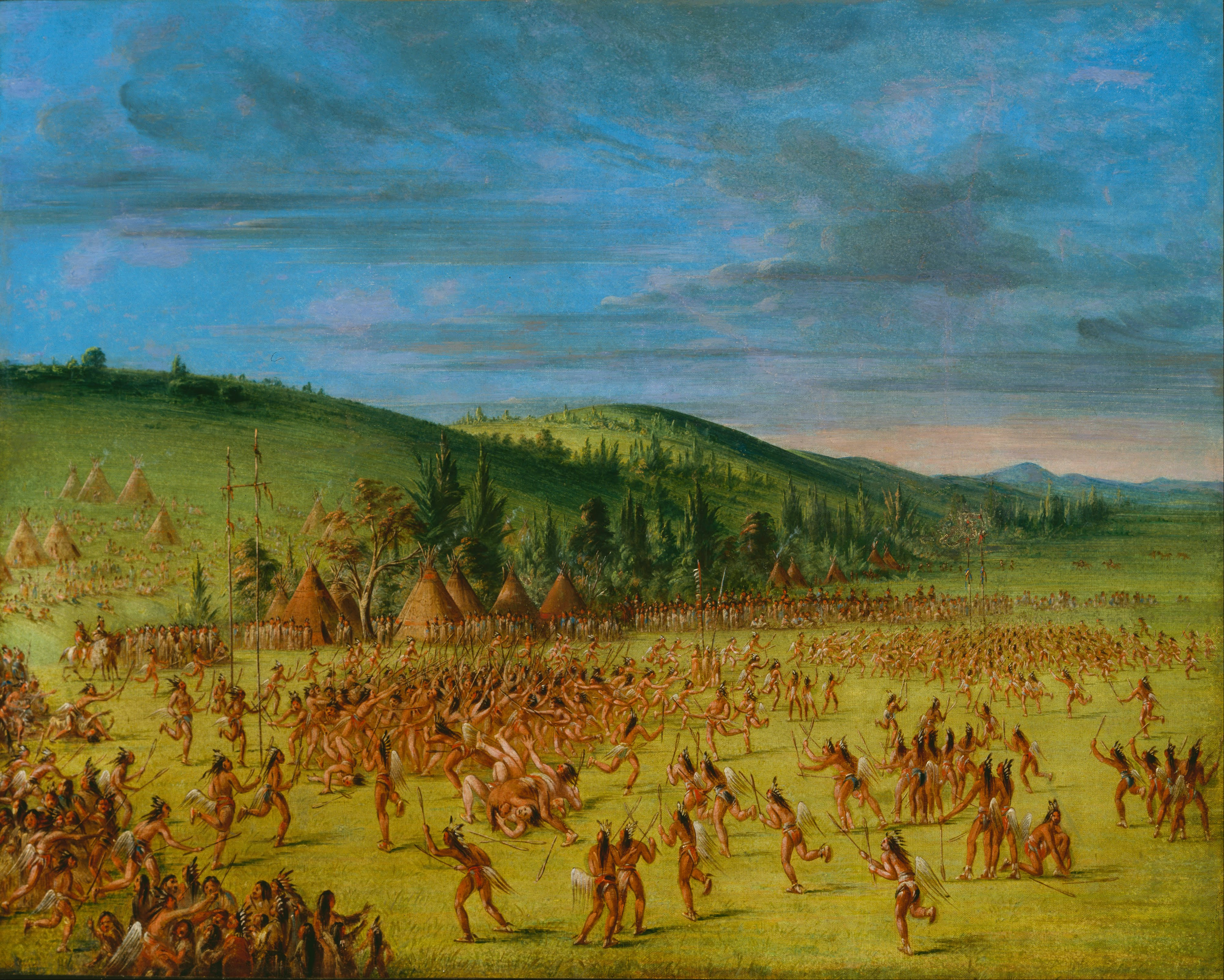
Choctaw Stickball 1830s painted by George Catlin.

Native American stickball, one of the oldest field sports in the Americas, was also known as the "little brother of war" because of its roughness and substitution for war. When disputes arose between Choctaw communities, stickball provided a "civilized" way to settle the issue. The earliest reference to stickball was in 1729 by a Jesuit priest. The stickball games would involve as few as twenty or as many as 300 players. John R. Swanton states of George Catlin's remarks on the game,

It is no uncommon occurrence for six or eight hundred or a thousand [!] of these young men to engage in a game of ball, with five or six times that number of spectators, of men, women, and children, surrounding the ground, and looking on...

The goal posts could be from a few hundred feet apart to a few miles. Goal posts were sometimes located within each opposing team's village.

The nature of the playing field was never strictly defined. The only boundaries were the two goalposts at either end of the playing area and these could be anywhere from 100 feet (30 m) to five miles (8 km) apart, as was the case in one game in the 19th century.

— Kendall Blanchard, The Mississippi Choctaws at Play: The Serious Side of Leisure

The Mississippi Band of Choctaw Indians play stickball today in the 21st century. Every year at the Choctaw Indian Fair near Philadelphia, Mississippi, as well as at the Choctaw Labor Day festival in Tuskahoma, Oklahoma, stickball can be seen played on a modern-day football field.

== Traditional arts ==
The Choctaws are basket weavers and bead workers, dancers and musicians, and cuisine specialists, all of which are part of the collective Choctaw culture that defines them as a distinct cultural group.

Choctaw traditional arts also includes textiles in bison fur and plant fibers by nan tʋnna (textile artisans) and beadwork, including isht ʋskufʋchi beaded sashes.

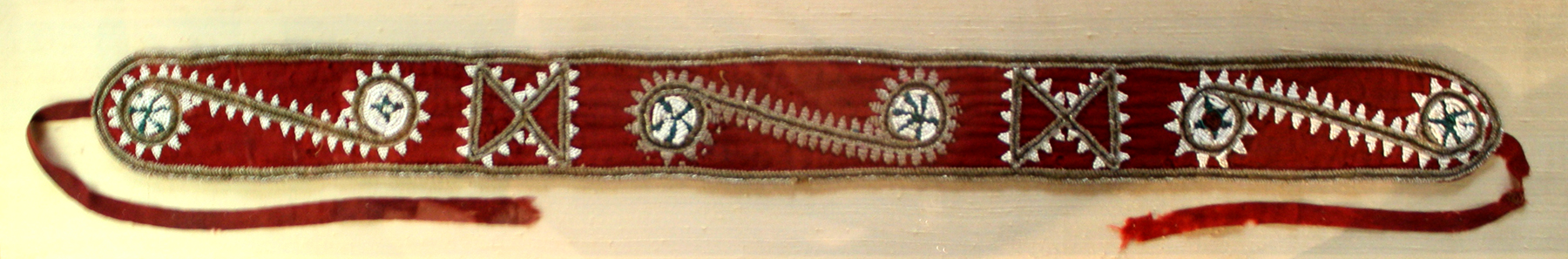
Choctaw beaded baldric sash, ca. 1830s, OHS

== See also ==
- Choctaw Indian Fair
- Native American art
- Wild onion festival
