= Hoop rolling =

Sport and a child's game

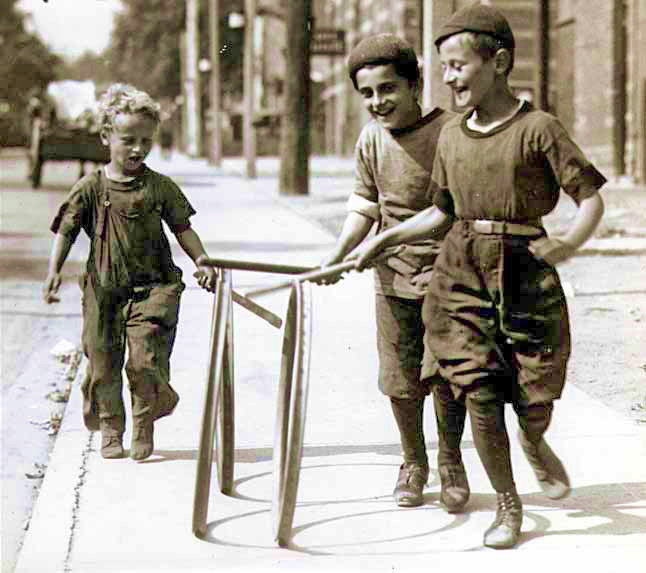
Canadian boys rolling bicycle rim hoops in Toronto, 1922

Hoop rolling, also called hoop trundling, is both a sport and a child's game in which a large hoop is rolled along the ground, generally by means of an object wielded by the player. The aim of the game is to keep the hoop upright for long periods of time, or to do various tricks.

Hoop rolling has been documented since antiquity in Africa, Asia and Europe. A variant of hoop rolling that doubles as a target game is an ancient tradition widely dispersed among different societies. In Asia, the earliest records date from Ancient China, and in Europe from Ancient Greece.

In the West, the most common materials for the equipment have been wood and metal. Wooden hoops, driven with a stick about one foot long, are struck with the centre of the stick in order to ensure good progress. Metal hoops, instead of being struck, can be guided by a metal hook.

== History ==
A version of hoop rolling played as a target game is encountered as an ancient tradition among aboriginal peoples in many parts of the world. The game, known as hoop-and-pole, is ubiquitous throughout most of Africa.

In the Americas, it has been played by a great number of unrelated Native American tribes. The game has exhibited many variations of materials and size of implements and rules of play. It is postulated that its wide distribution is a factor of the rich symbolic possibilities of the game, rather than indicating radial diffusion from a single center of invention.

=== Ancient Greece ===
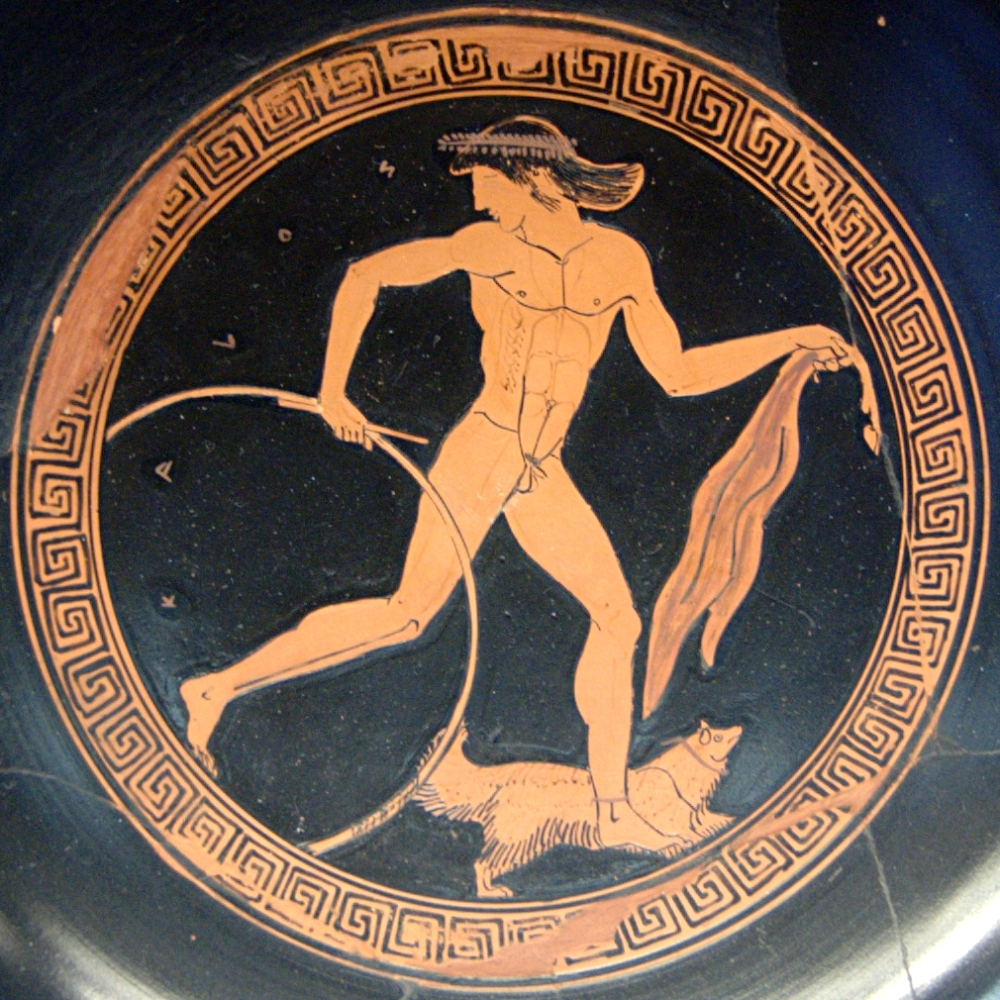
A Greek youth depicted playing with a hoop

Ancient Greeks referred to the hoop as the "trochus". Hoop rolling was practiced in the gymnasium, and the prop was also used for tumbling and dance with different techniques. Although a popular form of recreation, hoop rolling was not featured in competition at the major sports festivals.

Hoops, also called krikoi, were probably made of bronze, iron, or copper, and were driven with a stick called the "elater". The hoop was sized according to the player, as it had to come up to the level of the chest. Greek vases generally show the elater as a short, straight stick. The sport was regarded as healthful, and was recommended by Hippocrates for strengthening weak constitutions. Even very young children would play with hoops.

The hoop held symbolic meanings in Greek myth and culture. Hoop driving is an attribute of Ganymede, often depicted on Greek vase paintings from the 5th century BCE. Images of the hoop are sometimes presented in the context of ancient Greek pederastic tradition.

=== Ancient Rome and Byzantium ===
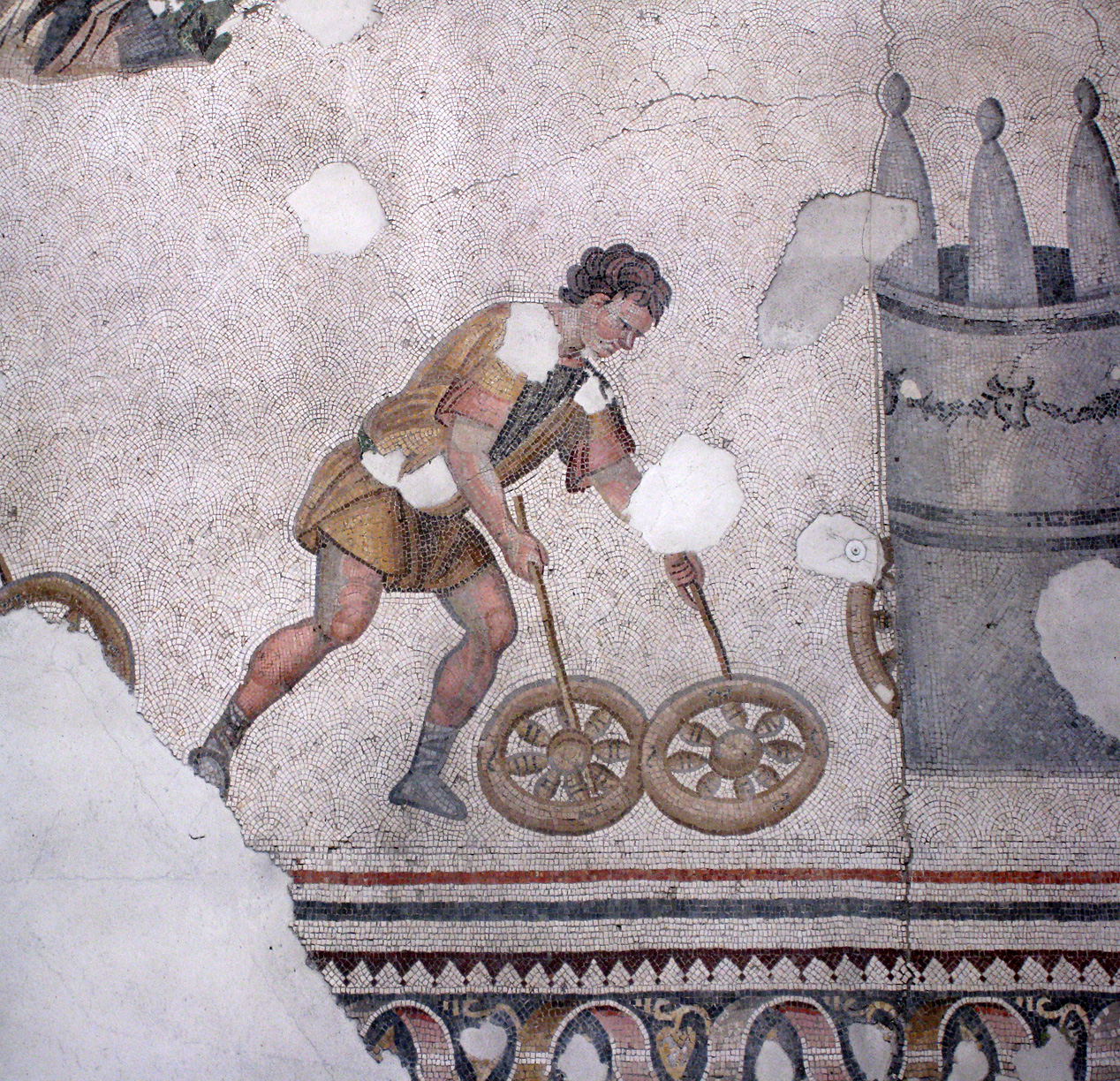
A boy playing with hoops, depicted in the 6th-century mosaics of the Great Palace of Constantinople

During the Roman Empire, circa 100–300 AD, the Romans learned hoop driving from the Greeks and generally held the sport in high regard. The Latin term for hoop is also "trochus", at times referred to as the "Greek hoop". The stick was known as a "clavis" or "radius", had the shape of a key, and was made of metal with a wooden handle. Roman hoops were fitted with metal rings that slid freely along the rim. According to Martial, this was done so that the tinkling of the rings would warn passers by of the hoop's approach: "Why do these jingling rings move about upon the rolling wheel? In order that the passers-by may get out of the way of the hoop."(14. CLXIX) He also indicates that the metal tires of wooden cart wheels could be used as hoops: "A wheel must be protected. You make me a useful present. It will be a hoop to children, but to me a tyre for my wheel."(14. CLXVIII) Martial also mentions the sport was practised by Sarmatian boys, who rolled their hoops on the frozen Danube river. According to Strabo, one of the popular Roman venues for practising the sport was the Campus Martius, which was large enough to accommodate a wide variety of activities.

The Roman game was to roll the hoop while throwing a spear or stick through it. For Romans, this was more an entertainment and military development, not a philosophical activity. Several ancient sources praise the sport. According to Horace, hoop driving was one of the manly sports. Ovid in his Tristia is more specific, putting the sport in the same category with horsemanship, javelin throwing and weapon practice: "Usus equi nunc est, levibus nunc luditur armis, Nunc pila, nunc celeri volvitur orbe trochus." It was also presented as a virtue in the Distichs of Cato, which enjoin youth to "Trocho lude; aleam fuge" ("Play with the hoop, flee the dice"). A 2nd-century medical text by Antyllus, preserved in an anthology of Oribasius, Emperor Julian's physician, describes hoop rolling as a form of physical and mental therapy. Antyllus indicates that at first the player should roll the hoop maintaining an upright posture, but after warming up he can begin to jump and run through the hoop. Such exercises, he holds, are best done before a meal or a bath, as with any physical exercise.

=== East Asia ===
In China, the game is believed to date to 1000 BC or earlier.

== Modern usage ==
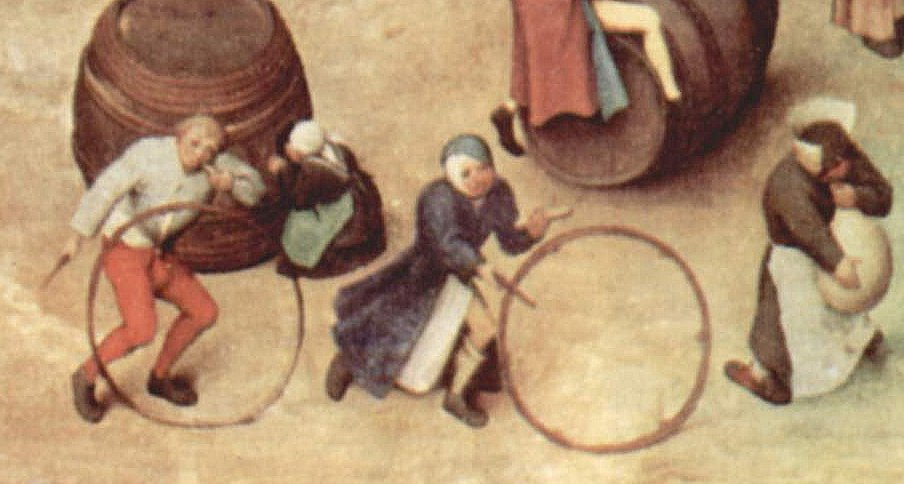
Dutch children rolling hoops, depicted in Pieter Bruegel's 1560 painting Children's Games

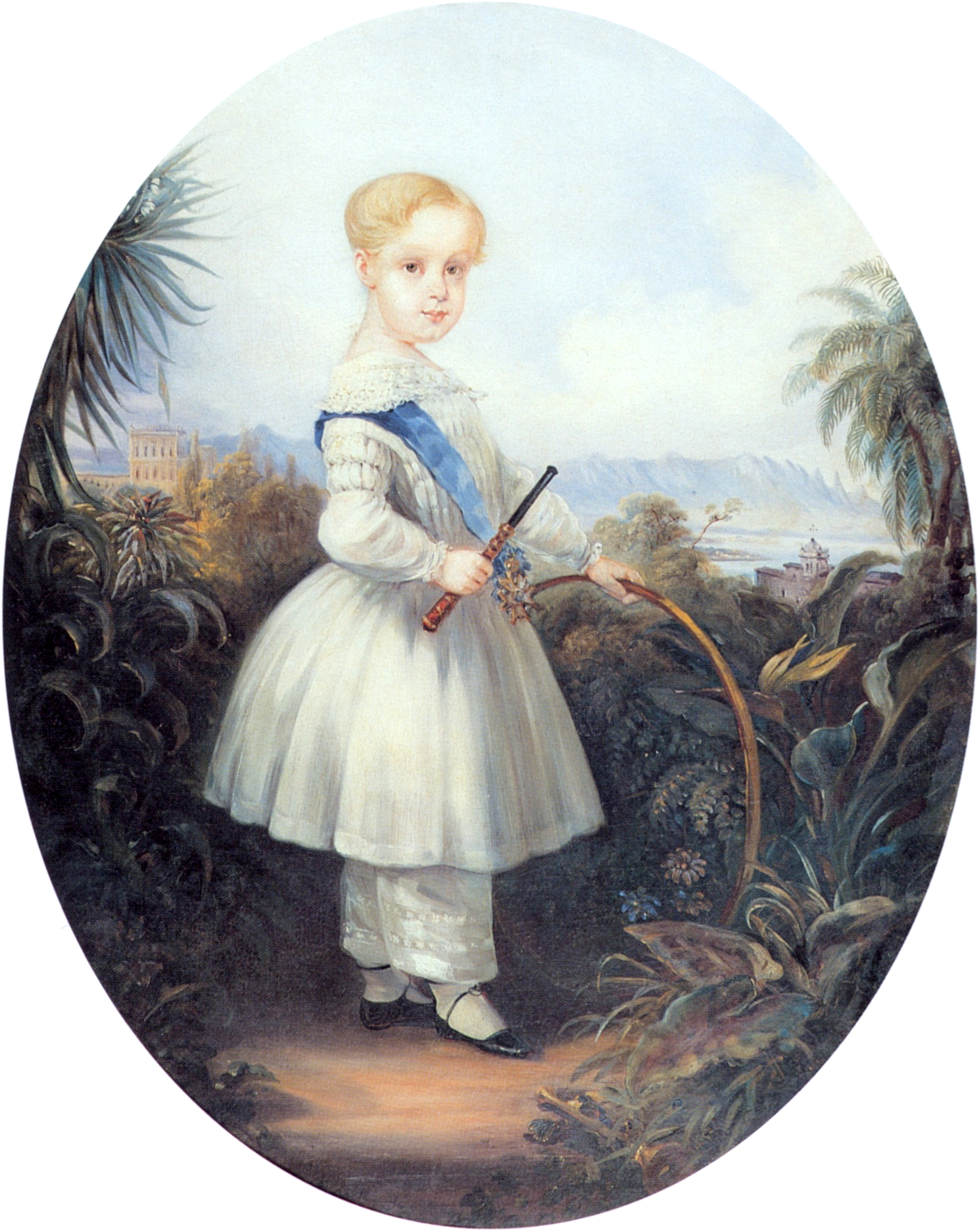
Afonso, Prince Imperial of Brazil holding a stick and hoop, 1846

Early 19th-century travellers saw children playing with hoops over much of Europe and beyond.

The game was a common pastime of Tanzanian village children of the African Tanganyika plateau circa the 1910s. Not long after, it is recorded in the Freetown settler community. Christian missionaries encountered it there in the 19th century. Children in late Edo period Japan also were known to play the game.

In English the sport is known by several names, "hoop and stick", "bowling hoops", or "gird and cleek" in Scotland, where the gird is the hoop and the cleek, the stick.

In the west, around the end of the 19th century, the game was played by boys up to about twelve years of age. Hoops would at times have pairs of tin squares nailed to the inside of the circle, to jingle as the hoop was rolled. Up to a dozen such pairs of rattles might be placed around the rim of the hoop. Some preferred the ashen hoops, round on the outside and flat on the inside, to the ones made of iron, as the latter could break windows and hurt the legs of passersby and horses.

=== Games ===
Among the games played with the hoops—besides simply trundling them, which is a matter of driving them forward while keeping them upright—are hoop races, as well as games of dexterity. Among these are "toll", in which the player must drive their hoop between two stones placed two to three inches apart without touching either one. Another such game is "turnpike", in which one player drives the hoop between pairs of objects, such as bricks, at first placed so that the opening is about a foot wide, with each gate kept by a different player. After running all the gates, the openings are made smaller by one inch, and the player trundling the hoop runs the course again. The process repeats until the hoop strikes the side of a gate, then the player and turnpike keeper switch places.

Conflict games such as "hoop battle" or "tournament" can also be played. For this game, players organise into opposing teams that drive their hoops against each other with the aim of knocking down as many of the opponents' hoops as possible. Only those hoops which fall as a result of a strike by another hoop are counted out. In some parts of Victorian England, boys played a similar game called "encounters", where two boys would drive their hoops against each other, with the one whose hoop was left standing being declared the winner.

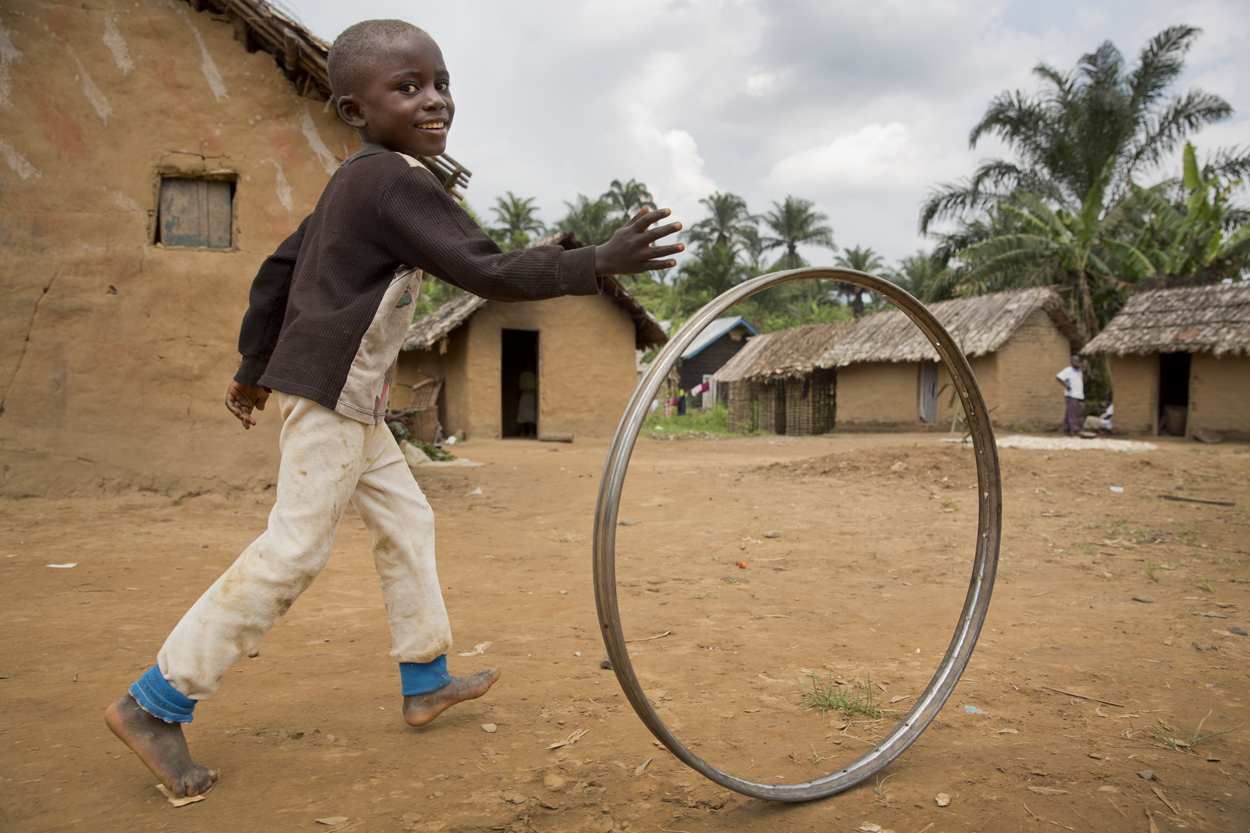
Boy playing hoop rolling in DRC

The "hoop hunt" is yet another game, in which one or more hoops are allowed to roll down a hill, with the double aim of rolling as far as possible and then of locating the hoop wherever it may have ended up.

=== British Empire ===
In England, children are known to have played the game as early as the 15th century. By the late 18th century, boys driving hoops in the London streets had become a nuisance, according to Joseph Strutt. Throughout the 1840s, a barrage of denunciations appeared in the papers against "The Hoop Nuisance", in which their iron hoops were blamed for inflicting severe injuries to pedestrians' shins. The London police attempted to eradicate the practice, confiscating the iron hoops of boys and girls trundling them through the streets and parks. That campaign, however, seems to have failed, as it was accompanied by renewed complaints about the increase of the nuisance.

Other writers mocked the complainers as grumblers depriving the "juvenile community" of a healthy and harmless pastime that had been practised for hundreds of years "without any apparent inconvenience to the public at large". The passion for passing laws was ridiculed: "Enact, say our modern philosophers, enact. Pass statute after statute. Regulate with exquisite minuteness the cries of the baby in the cradle, the laughter of the hoop-trundling boy, the murmurrings of the toothless old man." In the 1860s, the anti-trundling campaign was taken up by Charles Babbage, who blamed the boys for driving iron hoops under horses' legs, with the result that the rider is thrown and very often the horse breaks a leg. Babbage achieved a certain notoriety in this matter, being denounced in debate in Commons in 1864 for "commencing a crusade against the popular game of tip-cat and the trundling of hoops".

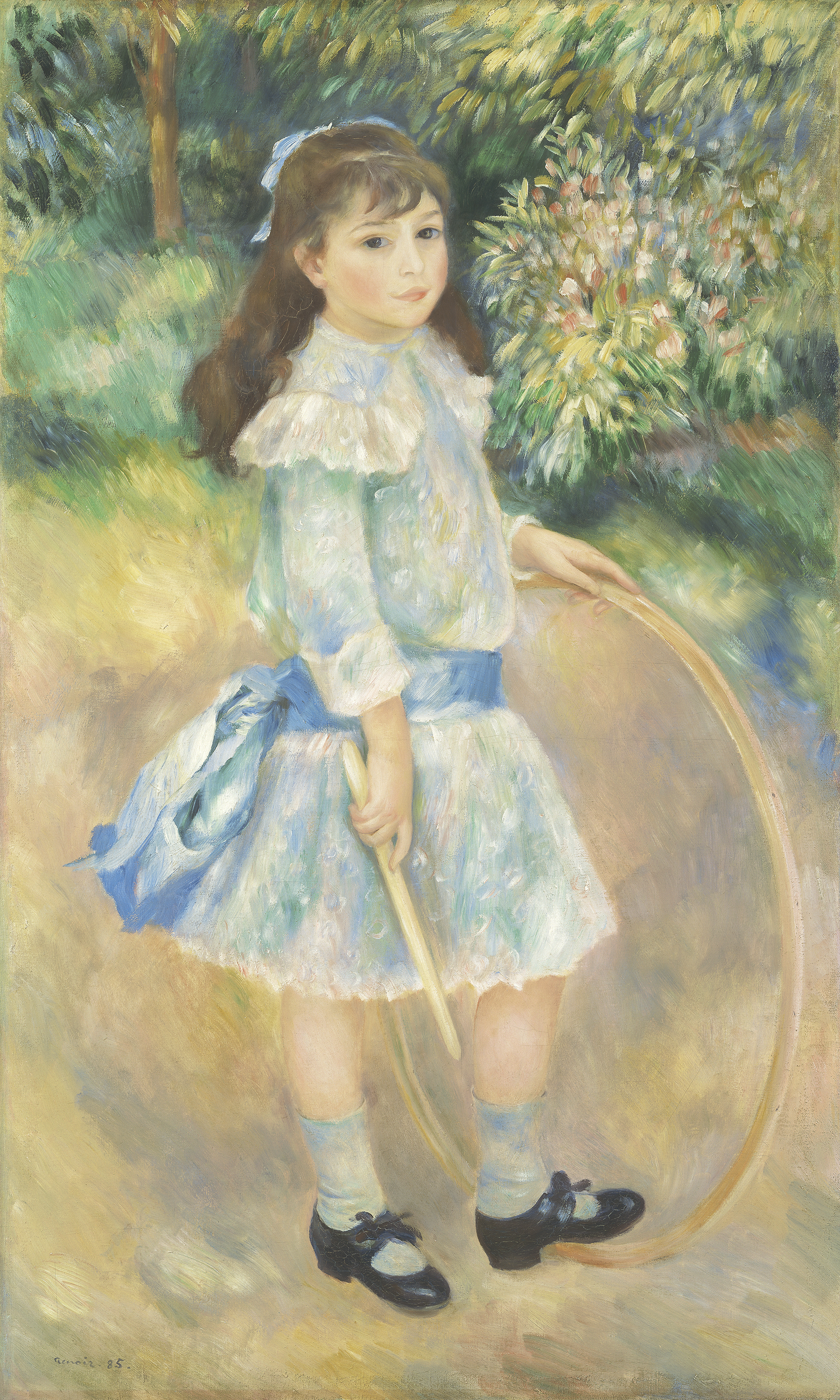
Girl with a Hoop (1885) by Pierre-Auguste Renoir

The fuss over boys playing with hoops reached around the globe—in the Colony of Tasmania, boys trundling hoops were blamed for endangering men riding horses and women's silk dresses, and the Hobart newspaper called for their banishment to the suburbs by law and police attention.

Not only schoolboys, but even graduate students at Cambridge enjoyed trundling hoops after their lectures. The practice, however, was brought to an end sometime before 1816, by means of a statute that forbade Masters of Arts to roll hoops or play marbles.

By the early 19th century, the game was already part of the standard physical education of girls, together with jumping rope and dumbbells. Girls from four to fourteen could be seen by the hundreds, trundling their hoops across the grass in the London parks. Though held to be common in the early years of the 19th century, the simplicity and innocence of those years was alleged to have been replaced by the 1850s with a precocious maturity, where "Instead of trundling hoops, urchins smoke cigars."

In the mid-19th century, bent ash was favoured as material for making wooden hoops. In early 20th-century England, girls played with a wooden hoop driven with a wooden stick, while boys' hoops were made of metal and the sticks were key-shaped and also made of metal. In some locations, hoops with spokes and bells were available in stores, but they were often disdained by boys.

Another alternate name for hoop rolling is Gird 'N Cleek. The World Gird 'N Cleek championships are held annually in New Galloway, Scotland. Winners include Andrew Firth (1983), Alexander McKenna (2009, 2018), Arthur Harfield (2019)..

=== Americas ===
A great number of widely separated Native American peoples play or played an ancient target-shooting version of hoop rolling currently known as Chunkey. Though the forms of the game exhibited great variation, generally certain elements were present, namely a prepared terrain over which a disc or hoop was rolled at high speed, at which implements similar to spears were thrown. The game, when played by adults, was often associated with gambling; and quite often, very valuable prizes, such as horses, exchanged hands. The game has been played by tribes such as the Arapaho, the Omaha, the Pawnee and many others.

Since hoop and stick involves spear throwing, it is thought to predate the introduction of the bow and arrow that took place around 500 AD. In the California region in the 18th century, it was widespread and known as "takersia". Canadian Inuit players divide into two groups. While the first group rolls the hoops—a large and a small one—the players in the other group attempt to throw spears through the hoops. The Cheyenne named two months of the year after the game: January is known as Ok sey' e shi his, "Hoop-and-stick game moon", and February as Mak ok sey' i shi, "Big hoop-and-stick game moon". Among the Blackfeet, children would play the game by throwing a feathered stick through the rolling hoop. Salish and Pend d'Oreilles youth played hoop and arrow games "to become skillful at bringing down small game for the village" in early spring, when the men were gone in search of large game.

Among European settlers, hoop-rolling was a seasonal sport, seeing the greatest activity in the winter. Children, besides rolling the hoops, also tossed them back and forth, catching them on their sticks. In the 1830s, hoop trundling was seen as an activity so characteristic of the young that it was adopted by a fanatic sect in Kentucky whose members mimicked children's activities in order to gain access to heaven. Hoop driving was also seen as a remedy for the sedentary and overprotected lives led by many American girls of the mid-19th century. The game was popular with both girls and boys: in an 1898 survey of 1000 boys and 1000 girls in Massachusetts, both the girls and the boys named hoop and stick their favorite toy. In Ohio, the wood of the American elm (Ulmus americana) was particularly valued for making hoop-poles.

At Bryn Mawr College, Wellesley College, and Wheaton College, the Hoop Rolling Contest is an annual spring tradition that dates back to 1895, and is only open to graduating seniors on that college's May Day celebration.

== See also ==
- Chunkey
- Hooping
- Hula hoop

== Sources ==
- Harold Arthur Harris (January 1972). Sport in Greece and Rome. Cornell University Press. ISBN 0-8014-0718-4.
