= A New Voyage to Carolina =

1709 book by John Lawson

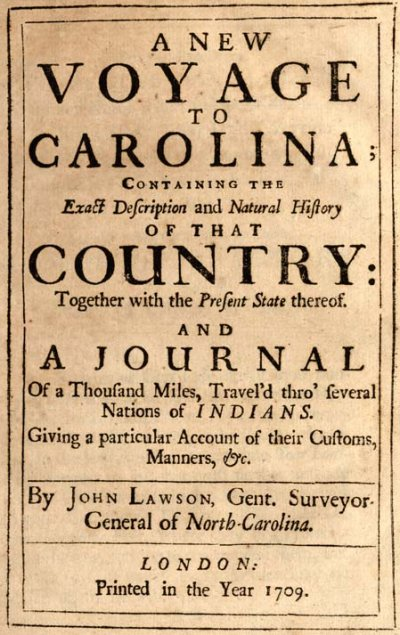
- Title page of 1first edition
- Author: John Lawson
- Language: English
- Subject: Colonial history of America
- Publication date: 1709

A New Voyage to Carolina (Note: Full title, A New Voyage to Carolina, containing the exact Description and Natural History of that Country, together with the present state thereof, and a journal of a Thousand Miles Travel'd through several Nations of Indians, giving a particular Account of their Customs, Manners, etc..) is a 1709 book by the English explorer and naturalist John Lawson. It is considered one of colonial America's most comprehensive accounts of Native American civilization. Lawson arrived in Charleston, and proceeded to trek through the back country and Upstate South Carolina, and on to New Bern and Virginia. The expedition lasted from 1700 to 1701, but the book was published only after Lawson served as the king's surveyor for the region.

The book was reprinted in the next decade as The History of Carolina (Note: Full title, The history of Carolina; containing the exact description and natural history of that country; together with the present state thereof. And a journal of a thousand miles, travel'd thro' several nations of Indians, giving a particular account of their customs, manners, &c.) . Lawson was subsequently captured, tortured, and executed by the Tuscarora people (a tribe documented in the book) during a period of resistance to colonial depredation.

== See also ==
- Tuscarora War
- Province of North Carolina
