= John Lawson (explorer) =

English explorer, naturalist and writer (1674–1711)

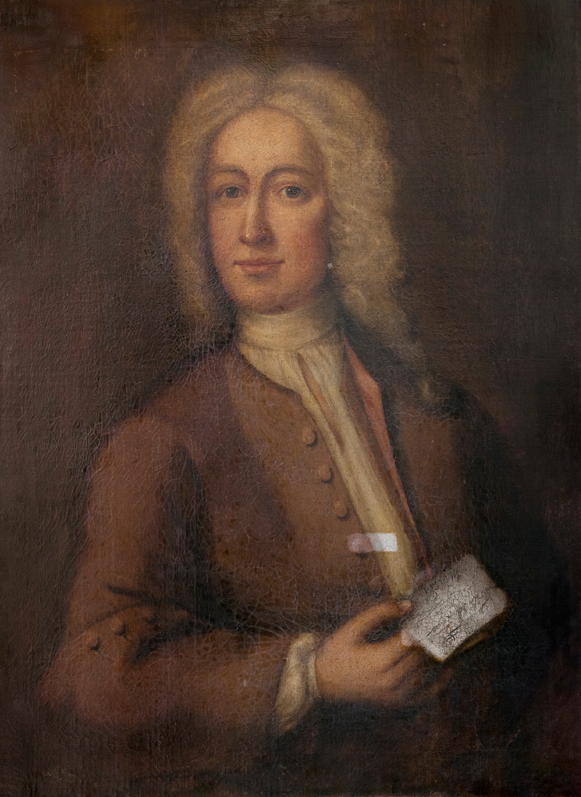
- Possible portrait of Lawson by Godfrey Kneller
- Born: 27 December 1674; England
- Died: 16 September 1711 (aged 36); Near Neuse River, Province of Carolina
- Cause of death: Ritual torture
- Known for: Exploration of the Carolinas
- Notable work: A New Voyage to Carolina

John Lawson (27 December 1674 – 16 September 1711) was an English explorer, naturalist, and writer. He played an important role in exploring the frontier regions of the Carolinas, publicising his expeditions in a book. He founded two settlements in North Carolina, Bath and New Bern, both located on rivers in the coastal plain. He was killed by the Tuscarora people which led to the outbreak of the Tuscarora War.

== Early life and education ==
John Lawson was born in England. Little is known definitively about his early life. He appears to have been the only son of Dr. John Lawson (1632–c. 1690) and Isabella Love (c. 1643–c. 1680). Both were from London. The family owned land near Kingston upon Hull, where Lawson may have been educated in his youth. He attended lectures at Gresham College, where the Royal Society often met. His education seems evidenced by his book. His freedom to explore and take charge suggest he was well placed in society. After an acquaintance in London assured him that "Carolina was the best country", Lawson as a young man sailed for England's North American colonies, arriving in Charleston, South Carolina on 15 August 1700.

== Exploration ==
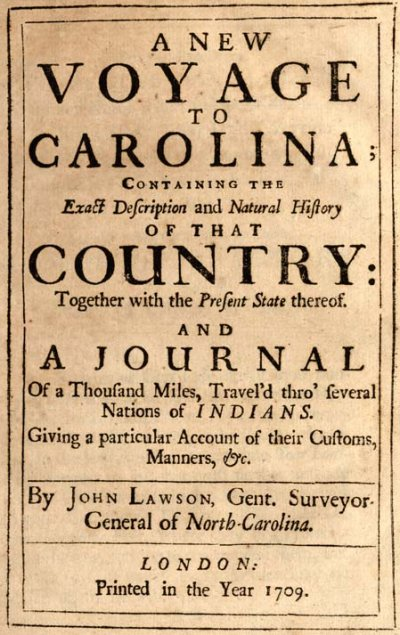
Title page of 1709 first edition of John Lawson's A New Voyage to Carolina

Beginning 28 December 1700, Lawson participated in a small expedition out of Charleston in the Carolina Colony to the interior. They traveled up the Santee River by canoe, and then on foot, to explore the Carolina backcountry. Along the way he was guided by American Indians; he took careful note of the vegetation, wildlife and, in particular, the many Native tribes he encountered. He traveled nearly 600 miles (970 km) through the wilderness, ending his journey near the mouth of the Pamlico River in what was later designated as North Carolina.

After his expedition, Lawson settled near the Pamlico River, where he earned a living as a private land surveyor. In 1705, he was appointed deputy surveyor for the Lords Proprietor of Carolina. In 1708, he succeeded Edward Moseley to become surveyor-general of the colony, a lucrative position.

Lawson played a major role in the founding of two of North Carolina's earliest permanent European settlements: Bath and New Bern. On 8 March 1705, Bath was the first town incorporated in what was to become North Carolina. Part of the incorporated land was owned by Lawson. He became one of the first town commissioners. Later he became clerk of the court and public register for Bath County.

In 1709, Lawson returned to London to oversee the publication of his book, A New Voyage to Carolina, in which he described the native inhabitants and the natural environment of the region. The book was an instant success. Several editions were published, including translations into German and French. The resulting publicity attracted many immigrant settlers to the colony of North Carolina.

While in London, Lawson represented the colony before the government in a boundary dispute with Virginia. He also organized a group of Germans from the Electorate of the Palatinate to settle in Carolina, returning with them in 1710 to found New Bern on the Neuse River. The government of Queen Anne had invited the Protestant refugees to England for passage to the colonies. They were fleeing extended hardship in their homeland, due to a record cold, and French invasions. Nearly 3000 Palatine Germans were settled in the New York Colony in 1710 as well, and worked in naval stores camps on the Hudson River to pay off their transportation.

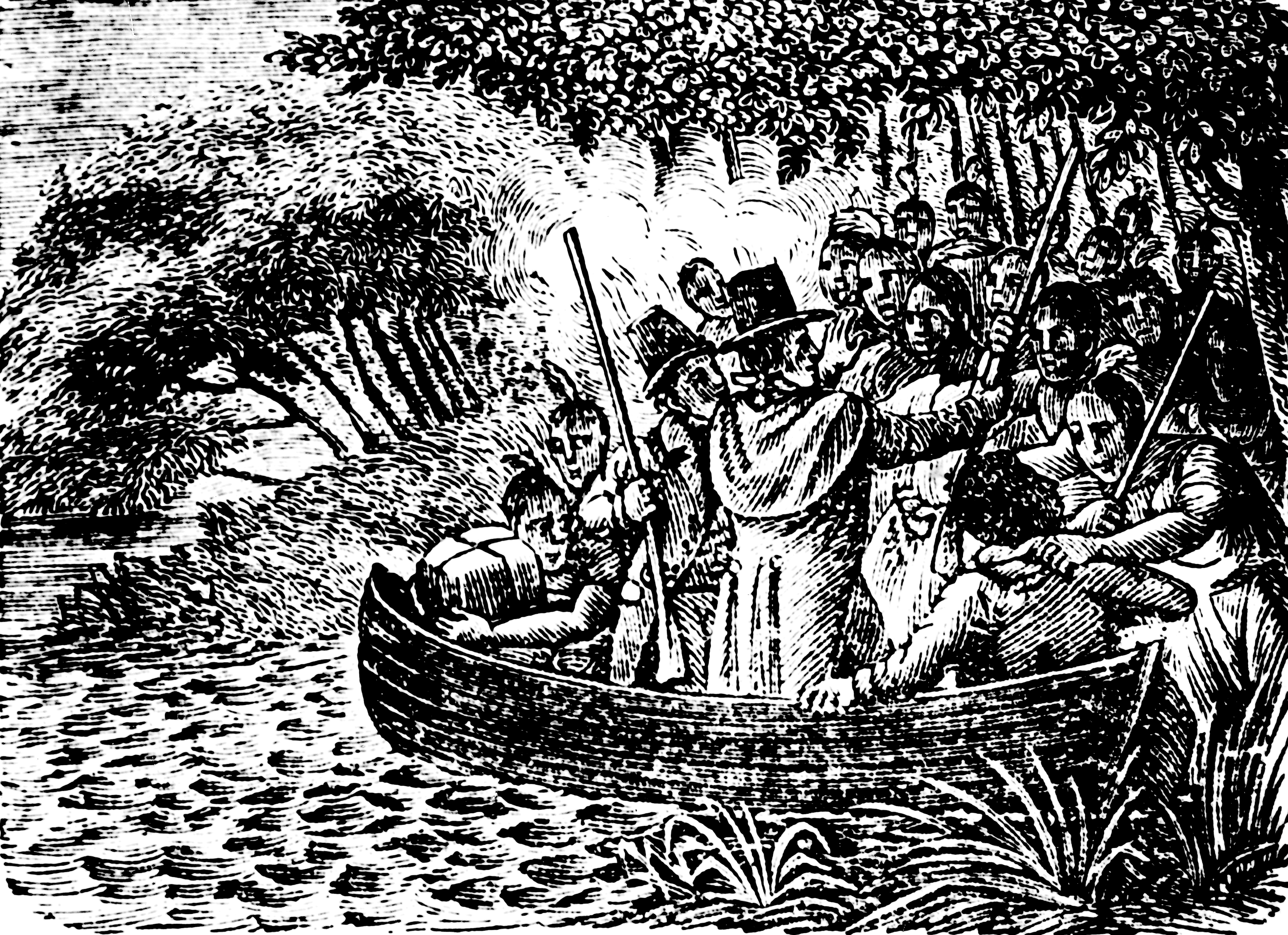
Depiction of the capture of John Lawson by the Tuscarora people

In September 1711, Lawson and his associate Christoph von Graffenried, 1st Baron of Bernberg were captured by Tuscarora natives while ascending the Neuse River. The Tuscarora released von Graffenried, but they subjected Lawson to ritual torture, typical of warriors, and killed him. Shortly thereafter, tensions between the Tuscarora and their allies and settlers erupted into a bloody conflict known as the Tuscarora War, lasting until the defeat of the Tuscarora in 1715. The colonists gathered their own American Indian allies, especially from among the Yamasee and Cherokee, traditional enemies and competitors of the Tuscarora.

== Selected works ==
- A New Voyage to Carolina (London, 1709). Other editions of this work appeared under the titles, The History of Carolina or Lawson's History of Carolina.

Online versions of this work:

- John Lawson, A New Voyage to Carolina, at Project Gutenberg
- John Lawson, A New Voyage to Carolina, at Documenting the South, University of North Carolina
