= Choctaw Indian Fair =

The Choctaw Indian Fair is an annual festival celebrating traditional Choctaw heritage. While held in Choctaw, Mississippi.

Choctaw Indian Fair displays traditional Handmade jewelry and clothing. The fair also displays the traditional game of "Kabotcha Toli" "Stickball".

== History ==
For centuries the Mississippi Choctaws have gathered at the ripening of the first corn. This gathering was called "The New Corn Ceremony" or "Green Corn Festival." The present day "Choctaw Indian Fair" has roots in this ancient celebration.

The Fair has long been a time for Choctaws to gather and pay homage to their traditions and heritage but it has also emerged as an opportunity for the Tribe to welcome visitors to the reservation and share their way of life.

Even though the Fair has been around for many years, the Mississippi Choctaw say that the fair began to evolve into the Annual Fair it has become in 1949. The Choctaw Princess Pageant was not added to the fair until 1955 when Patsy Sam (Buffington) was crowned as the first Choctaw Princess.

Nashville-style country music became part of the Choctaw Indian Fair in the 1960s when Nashville stars such as Chet Atkins, Connie Smith, Lester Flatt, Mac Wiseman, Jerry Reed, Johnny Gimble, Pig Robbins, and Merle Travis noticed what the Choctaws were doing with their Annual Fair. Each of these performers performed for free at the fair as a tribute to the Choctaw Nation and in support of the fair. In the 1970s, paid performers were added to the Fair and now the last three nights of the Fair include paid country music performers.

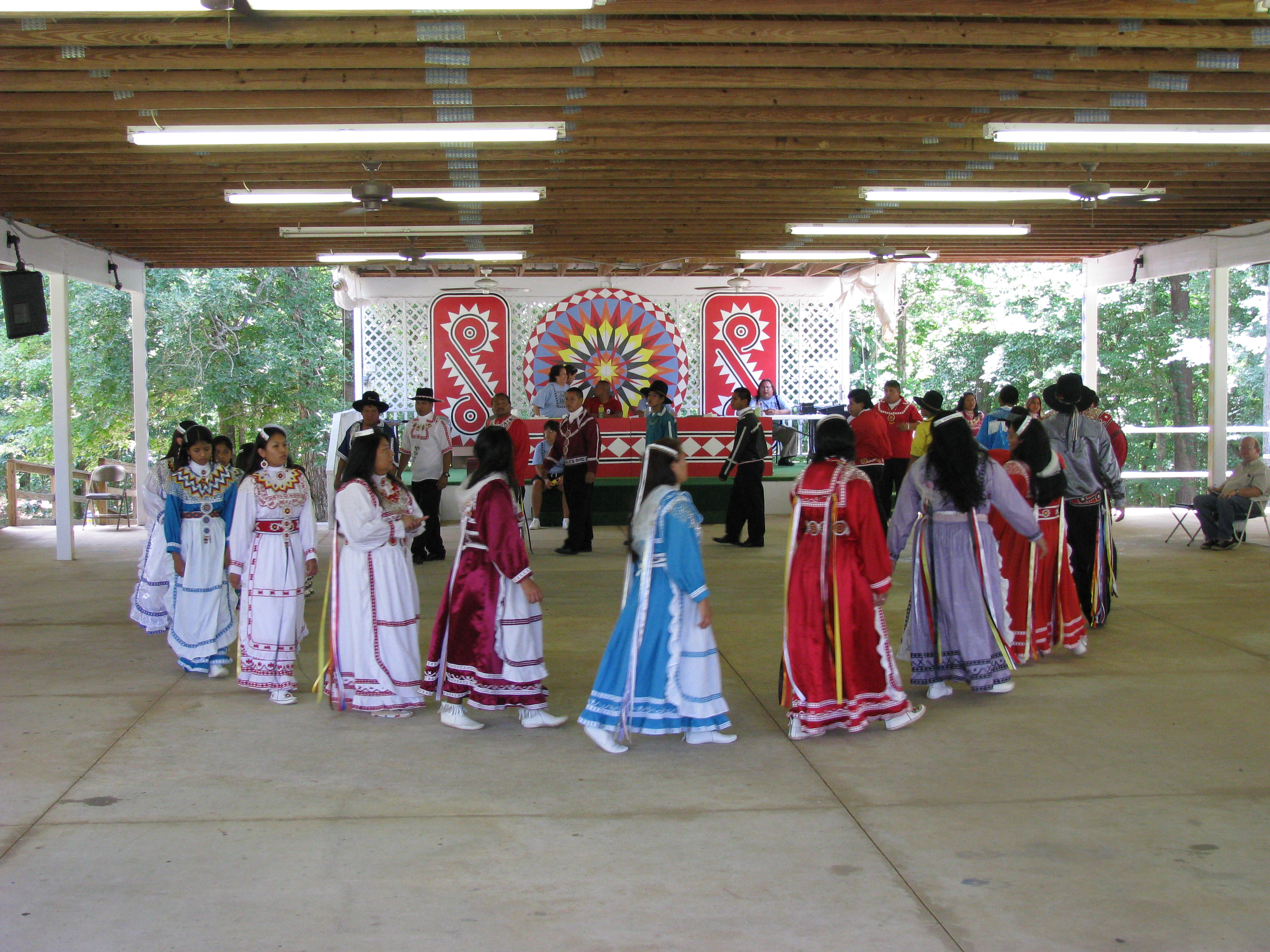
Dancers at Choctaw Indian Fair, in Neshoba County, Mississippi

Another important element of the annual fair has been a reemergence of the traditional dances of the Choctaw. In the 1970s, an effort began to revive many of the traditional dances of the Choctaw that were no longer being danced. Because of the renewed interest in traditional dance brought about by the Annual Fair, each morning and afternoon dance groups from different communities perform for fairgoers. Many of the dance groups now make paid appearances outside the reservation. The Choctaw dance performed at the Annual Fair is seen as an authentic expression of the ancient Choctaw traditional culture and gives people who attend the fair a glimpse into that culture.

Along with music and dance, many Choctaw artists display their bead work, baskets, drums, and other art during the Fair. At many of the artists' tables, fairgoers will see the skills of the artist being passed down traditionally as there will be two or three generations of the same family working on projects.

The 2021 Choctaw Indian Fair took place 14–17 July, as the COVID-19 pandemic caused 2020's cancellation.
