= National Register of Historic Places listings in Greene County, North Carolina =

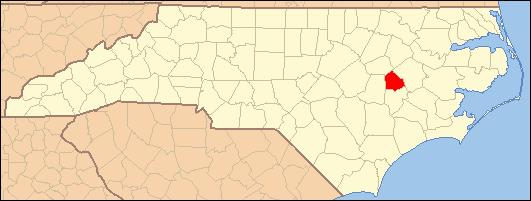

This list includes properties and districts listed on the National Register of Historic Places in Greene County, North Carolina. Click the "Map of all coordinates" link to the right to view a Google map of all properties and districts with latitude and longitude coordinates in the table below.

== Current listings ==
This National Park Service list is complete through NPS recent listings posted March 14, 2025.

	Name on the Register	Image	Date listed	Location	City or town	Description
1	Benjamin W. Best House		February 3, 2006 (#05000349)	2193 Mewborn Church Rd. 35°24′42″N 77°45′43″W	Jason	
2	Titus W. Carr House		November 25, 1987 (#87002013)	SR 1244; 35°32′14″N 77°40′46″W	Walstonburg	
3	Edward R. and Sallie Ann Coward House		March 6, 2002 (#02000131)	NC 1405, 0.2 miles E of jct. with NC 1400; 35°26′59″N 77°32′49″W	Ormondsville	
4	Greene County Courthouse		May 10, 1979 (#79001712)	Greene and 2nd Sts. 35°27′20″N 77°40′13″W	Snow Hill	
5	Hardee House		September 22, 2014 (#14000703)	515 L.A. Moye Rd. 35°29′13″N 77°31′30″W	Ormondsville	
6	Neoheroka Fort Site	Neoheroka Fort Site	July 17, 2009 (#09000529)	Address Restricted; 35°28′43″N 77°43′47″W	Snow Hill	
7	St. Barnabas Episcopal Church		October 10, 1979 (#79003337)	SE 4th St. and St. Barnabas Rd. 35°27′05″N 77°40′15″W	Snow Hill	
8	Snow Hill Colored High School		August 28, 2003 (#03000853)	602A W. Harper St. 35°26′57″N 77°41′01″W	Snow Hill	
9	Snow Hill Historic District		September 14, 2000 (#00001122)	Greene, Harper, 1st, 2nd, 3rd, and 4th Sts.; also W. Harper St. between W. 6th St. and W. 4th St. 35°27′08″N 77°40′15″W	Snow Hill	Second set of boundaries represents a boundary increase of August 27, 2009
10	Speight-Bynum House		March 12, 1992 (#92000148)	NC 1231 W side, 0.4 miles N of jct. with NC 1232; 35°35′05″N 77°45′53″W	Walstonburg	
11	Zachariah School		May 4, 2005 (#05000377)	NC 1239, 0.6 miles S o NC 1244; 35°31′28″N 77°41′53″W	Wooten's Crossroads	

== See also ==
- National Register of Historic Places listings in North Carolina
- List of National Historic Landmarks in North Carolina
