= Snow Hill school bus collision =

1985 multi-vehicle collision in North Carolina

Details
- Date: May 31, 1985
- Location: Snow Hill, North Carolina
- Coordinates: 35.459°N 77.703°W

Statistics
- Bus: School bus
- Vehicles: tractor-trailer (2), automobile
- Passengers: 31
- Deaths: 7
- Injured: 24

The Snow Hill school bus collision was a vehicle accident that occurred on May 31, 1985, on US 13 near Snow Hill, North Carolina, United States. Four vehicles were involved, including a school bus operated by the Greene County Schools. Six students and Carson Lee Conger, 27, of Norfolk, Virginia, were killed. The remaining 24 persons in the accident suffered injuries ranging from minor to critical.

The U.S. National Transportation Safety Board (NTSB) determined that the probable cause of the crash was the failure of one of the drivers to keep his vehicle right of the center line. Contributing to that failure was the likelihood of a momentary lapse of attention caused by fatigue or an epileptic seizure.

== Crash ==
At the time of the crash, the school bus was travelling southbound on the two-lane road, carrying twenty-six students aged 9–13 from Snow Hill Primary School and West Greene Middle School. A Military Distributors of Virginia, Inc., tractor-trailer carrying pickles was traveling north. The second tractor-trailer, carrying grain (shelled corns), was directly behind the school bus and the passenger vehicle, a Dodge Challenger driven by was behind the grain truck.

The incident occurred on a curve in US 13, 2.3 miles south of Snow Hill. At approximately 3:20 pm, Conger, driving his tractor-trailer northbound, crossed the center line and struck the school bus. Dawn, the driver of the bus tried to avoid the truck but a collision was inevitable, and the left side of the school bus was torn off. The tractor-trailer then collided with the southbound tractor-trailer and the passenger vehicle struck the rear of the southbound tractor-trailer. The impact of the pickle and grain trucks hitting each other caused a fire in both cabs, killing Conger. The second driver, however, was able to escape the blaze.

During the second collision, the tractor and trailer of the Military Distributors truck separated and the tractor turned over on its right side into the northbound lane. The cab burst into flames and the driver of the tractor was killed. The front of the grain trailer also caught fire but the driver of that vehicle was able to escape. The driver of the second truck and the passenger in the automobile sustained minor injuries.

== Victims ==
Reportedly, Conger was alive at during the time of the initial impact, but died due to multiple chest injuries, combined with the fire that broke out in his cab.

Of the twenty-six students on the school bus, five were killed instantly: Mittie Mumford (9), Ricky Corbitt (11), James Arthur Lee (12), and Robert Warren (12) and Shawanna Albritton(13). Corbitt and Warren were cousins. Robbie Bass, 10 years old, died the evening of June 2 at Duke University Hospital, bringing the death toll to a total of seven. The remaining students, along with the bus driver, were injured, many critically. Three students were air-lifted to Duke University Medical Center in Durham, North Carolina, and the remainder were transported to Wayne County Memorial Hospital in Goldsboro, North Carolina.

== Investigation ==
The U.S. National Transportation Safety Board sent a five-member team to the site of the crash. The team found that the driver of the Military Distributors tractor-trailer had, during a momentary lapse in alertness, crossed the center line into the path of the school bus. The driver was also found to have suffered from epilepsy. The Board was unable to determine whether the lapse in alertness was due to an epileptic seizure, fatigue or another factor.

As a result of its investigation, the NTSB recommended that states end the "issuance of licenses for the operation of large commercial trucks and vehicles capable of transporting more than 10 passengers to persons with diagnosed seizure disorders." It also recommended that physicians be required to report information about the identity of those with seizure disorders to the driver's license agency, and be granted legal immunity for making such reports.

In addition, the NTSB recommended strengthening and increased testing of the body panel and floor joists for school buses.
