= Hookerton, North Carolina =

- Town
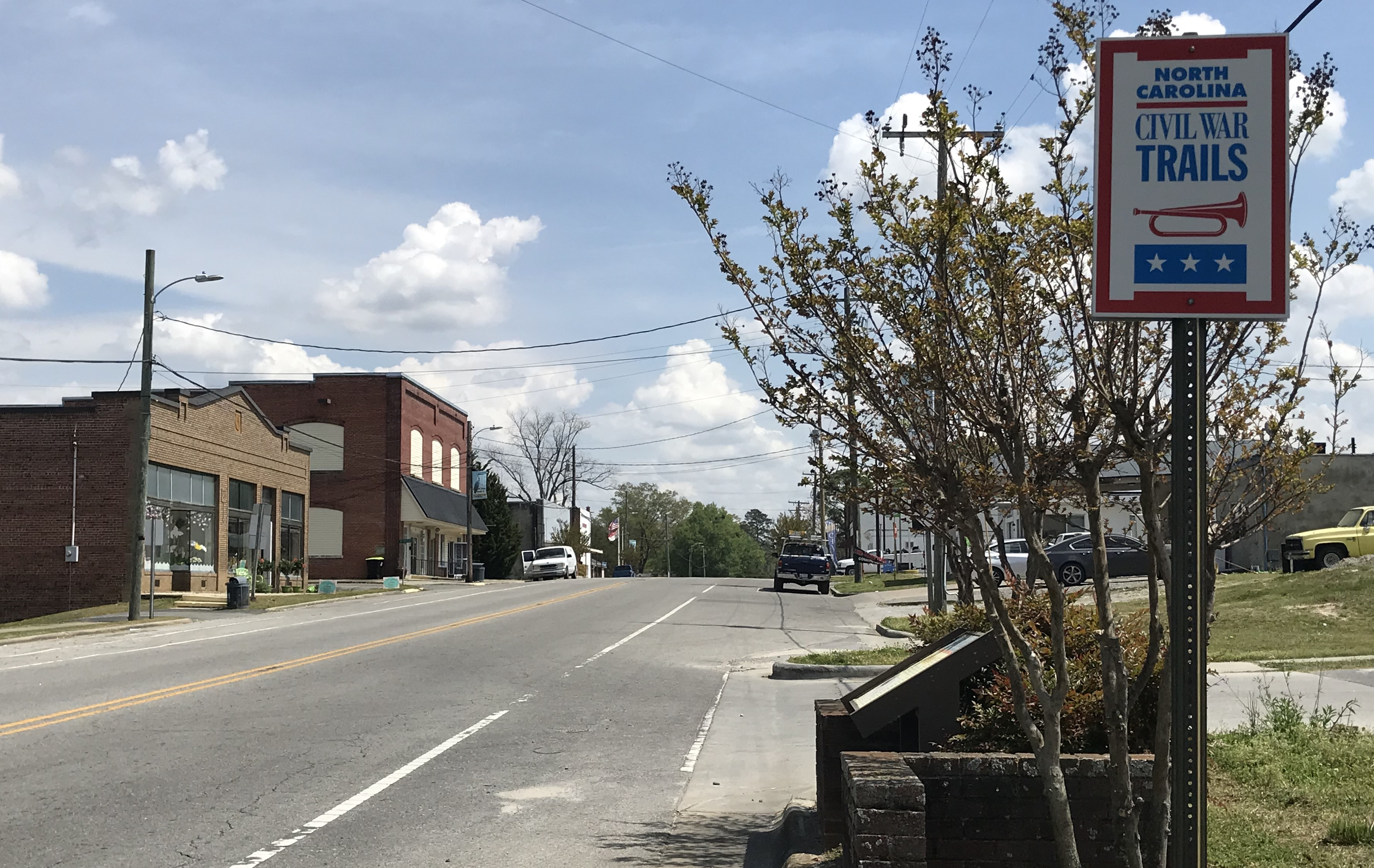

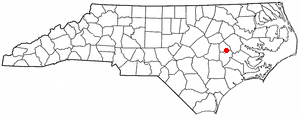
- Location of Hookerton, North Carolina
- Coordinates: 35°25′23″N 77°35′22″W
- Country: United States
- State: North Carolina
- County: Greene
- Incorporated: 1817
- Named for: William Hooker

Area
  - Total: 0.32 sq mi (0.83 km^{2})
  - Land: 0.32 sq mi (0.83 km^{2})
  - Water: 0 sq mi (0.00 km^{2})
- Elevation: 66 ft (20 m)

Population (2020)
  - Total: 413
  - Density: 1,296.1/sq mi (500.43/km^{2})
- Time zone: UTC-5 (Eastern (EST))
  - Summer (DST): UTC-4 (EDT)
- ZIP code: 28538
- Area code: 252
- FIPS code: 37-32540
- GNIS feature ID: 2405860
- Website: www.hookertonnc.com

Hookerton is a town in Greene County, North Carolina, United States. The population was 413 at the 2020 census. It is geographically located southeast of Snow Hill on North Carolina Highway 123. The town is part of the Greenville Metropolitan Area.

== Geography ==
According to the United States Census Bureau, the town has a total area of 0.3 square miles (0.78 km^{2}), all land.

== Demographics ==
Historical population
Census	Pop.	Note	%±
1870	163		—
1880	179		9.8%
1890	173		−3.4%
1900	139		−19.7%
1910	204		46.8%
1920	294		44.1%
1930	307		4.4%
1940	319		3.9%
1950	253		−20.7%
1960	358		41.5%
1970	441		23.2%
1980	460		4.3%
1990	422		−8.3%
2000	467		10.7%
2010	409		−12.4%
2020	413		1.0%
U.S. Decennial Census

As of the census of 2000, 467 people, 200 households, and 123 families residing in the town. The population density was 1,446.1 inhabitants per square mile (558.3/km^{2}). There were 219 housing units at an average density of 678.1 per square mile (261.8/km^{2}). The racial makeup of the town was 52.89% White, 40.26% African American, 6.64% from other races, and 0.21% from two or more races. Hispanic or Latino of any race were 8.14% of the population.

There were 200 households, out of which 27.0% had children under the age of 18 living with them, 42.0% were married couples living together, 14.5% had a female householder with no husband present, and 38.5% were non-families. 37.0% of all households were made up of individuals, and 18.0% had someone living alone who was 65 years of age or older. The average household size was 2.34 and the average family size was 3.07.

In the town, the population was spread out, with 24.0% under the age of 18, 9.6% from 18 to 24, 23.1% from 25 to 44, 26.3% from 45 to 64, and 16.9% who were 65 years of age or older. The median age was 40 years. For every 100 females, there were 78.2 males. For every 100 females age 18 and over, there were 78.4 males.

The median income for a household in the town was $31,563, and the median income for a family was $45,625. Males had a median income of $29,231 versus $26,667 for females. The per capita income for the town was $14,371. About 7.4% of families and 16.7% of the population were below the poverty line, including 22.8% of those under age 18 and 24.6% of those age 65 or over.

== Education ==
The town is served by the Greene County Schools system, with five schools located in nearby Snow Hill. In addition to these schools, there is one private school, Mt. Calvary Christian Academy. Early in the 20th century, Hookerton Collegiate Institute was located in the center of town and R.J. Matlock was the principal of the school. It did not survive the availability of public education. (His daughter, Sara Stocks of Hookerton, served on and as chair of the Greene County School Board for a number of years in mid-century, continuing the family's interest in local education.)

== Transportation ==
The closest airport to Hookerton is Pitt-Greenville Airport (IATA: PGV, ICAO: KPGV, FAA LID: PGV) with service to Charlotte Douglas International Airport.

The only highway that runs through Hookerton is NC 123. The closest interstate is I-95, located 40 miles (64 km) away, in Wilson.

East Carolina Railroad, intended to serve a route from Tarboro to Kinston, terminated in Hookerton instead, coming from Tarboro but ending just over the Contentnea Creek bridge and never reaching Kinston. The railroad provided passenger and freight service during the early 20th century, but has long since ceased operation.

== Notable people ==
- Jim Ray Hart, baseball player.
- Douglas A. Shackelford, American accounting academic, Dean, Kenan-Flagler Business School.
