= Tick Bite, North Carolina =

Unincorporated community in North Carolina, US

Coordinates: 35°20′54″N 77°25′51″W

Tick Bite is an unincorporated community on the Contentnea Creek near Grifton in Lenoir County, North Carolina, United States. The only business in the community was a quarry.

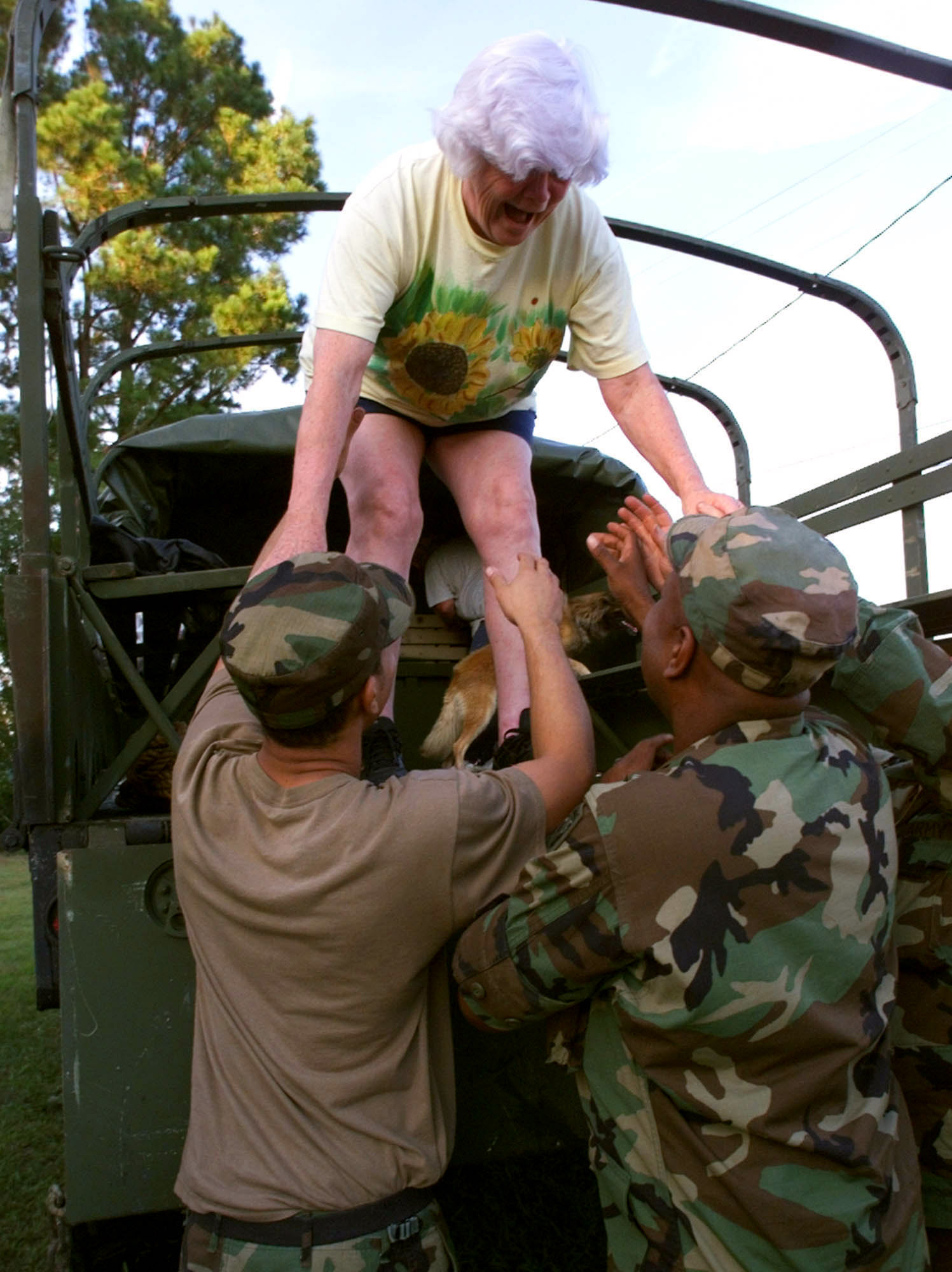
N.C. National Guard members help a woman near Tick Bite who was rescued by members from flood waters caused by Hurricane Floyd.

Tick Bite was decimated by Hurricane Floyd in 1999. Contentnea Creek, which runs parallel to much of the town, before emptying into the Neuse River, surged to levels that had not been seen (as estimated by county and state officials) in 500 years. The flooding set a new "500 year flood plain" for the area. Eagle Swamp, a tributary of Contentnea Creek, joins here.

Tick Bite was part of the homelands of the Tuscarora Indians and the location of Cowards Bridge, a major bridge on the road from Kinston to New Bern. During the Civil War, troops were located at the bridge with earthen breastworks to protect the bridge from attack.
