= Snow Hill Historic District =

Historic district in North Carolina, United States

- U.S. National Register of Historic Places
- U.S. Historic district
- Location within North Carolina Location within the United States
- Location: Greene, Harper, 1st, 2nd, 3rd, and 4th Sts.; also W. Harper St. between W. 6th St. and W. 4th St., Snow Hill, North Carolina
- Coordinates: 35°27′08″N 77°40′15″W
- Area: 165 acres (67 ha)
- Built: 1908
- Built by: Herman, Thomas B.; Loving, T.A., Company
- Architect: Boney, Leslie
- Architectural style: Greek Revival, Gothic Revival, Colonial Revival, Bungalow/craftsman, Minimal Traditional et al.
- NRHP reference No.: 00001122, 09000658 (Boundary Increase)
- Added to NRHP: September 14, 2000, August 27, 2009 (Boundary Increase)

Snow Hill Historic District is a national historic district located at Snow Hill, Greene County, North Carolina. The district encompasses 229 contributing buildings, a contributing site (St. Barnabas Church Cemetery), two contributing structures, and a contributing object (Clara Ernart gravestone) in the central business district and surrounding residential sections of Snow Hill. The buildings are in a variety of popular 19th and early-20th century architectural styles including Greek Revival, Gothic Revival, Colonial Revival, and, Bungalow / American Craftsman. Located in the district are the separately listed Greene County Courthouse and St. Barnabas Episcopal Church. Other notable buildings include J. Exum & Co. Grocery building, Harper Drugstore, Sugg-Harper House, Williams-Exum Housem, Murphrey-Morrill House (1885), Josiah Exum House (1887-1888), Alfred Warren House (1912-1915), Calvary Memorial Methodist Church (1928), Snow Hill Presbyterian Church (1935), and former First Baptist Church (1850, 1940).

It was listed on the National Register of Historic Places in 2000, with a boundary increase in 2009.
