= Greene Central High School =

American public school in North Carolina

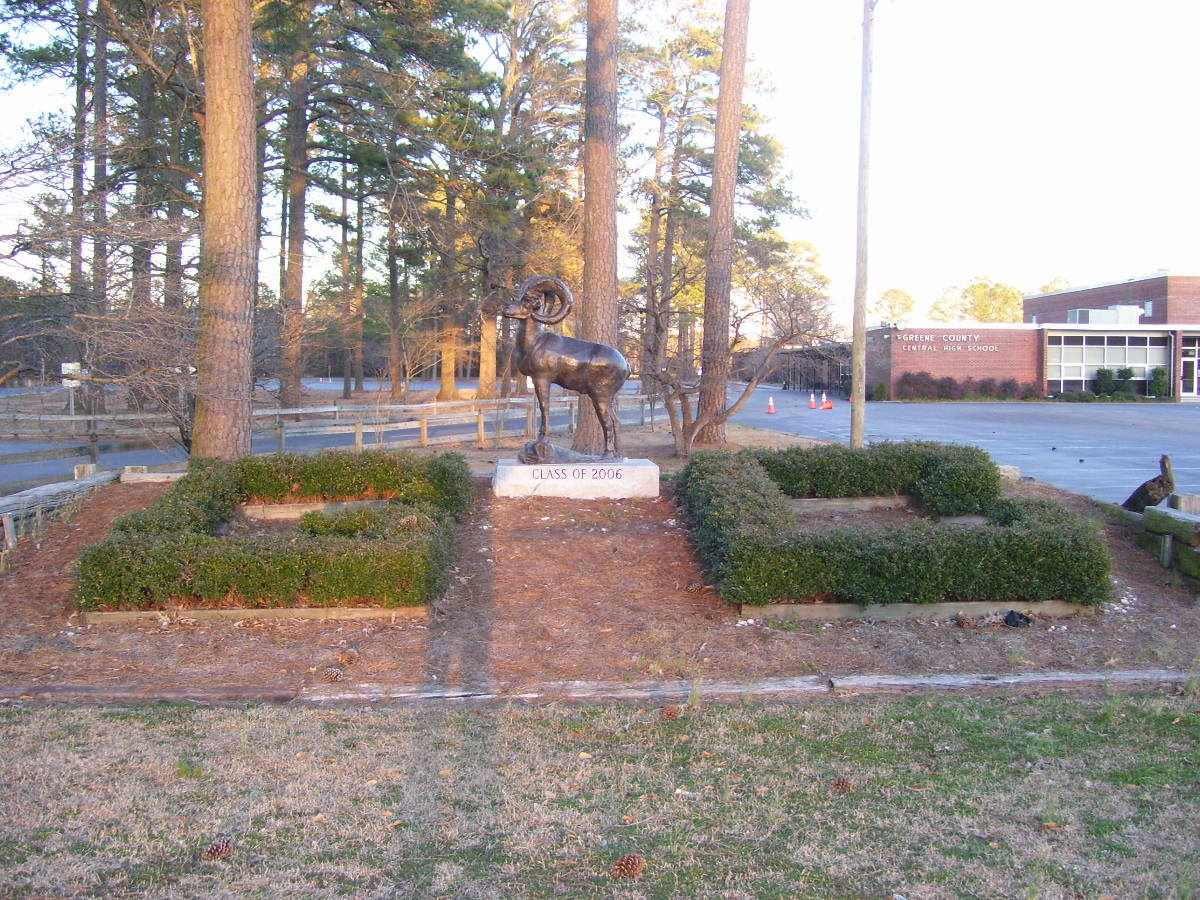
- Statue in front of Greene Central

Location
- 140 School Drive; Snow Hill, North Carolina 28580; United States
- Coordinates: 35°28′48″N 77°40′12″W

Information
- Type: Public
- Established: 1962 (64 years ago)
- School district: Greene County Schools
- CEEB code: 343665
- Principal: Patrick Greene
- Staff: 53.64 (FTE)
- Grades: 9–12
- Enrollment: 773 (2023-2024)
- Student to teacher ratio: 14.41
- Campus type: Rural
- Colors: Blue and white
- Mascot: Ram
- Newspaper: The Ram
- Yearbook: The Centralis
- Website: gchs.gcsedu.org

Greene Central Rams
- School: Greene Central High School
- NCHSAA: Division 2-A
- Conference: Eastern Carolina Conference
- Location: Snow Hill, NC
- Varsity teams: 15 varsity teams
- Nickname: Rams
- Colors: Blue and White

Greene Central High School is a public high school located in Greene County, North Carolina. The middle school feeding upcoming students into Greene Central is Greene County Middle School. The school mascot is the Ram. It is one of five schools of the Greene County School System.

== Notable alumni ==
- Blue Edwards, former NBA player
- Cliff Godwin, college baseball head coach
- Rapsody, hip hop artist
