= James Ray Hart =

James Ray Hart may refer to:

- Jim Ray Hart (1941–2016), American baseball player
- Jimmy Hart (born 1944), American professional wrestling manager and musician
