= Blue Edwards =

American basketball player (born 1965)

Personal information
- Born: October 31, 1965 (age 61) Washington, D.C., U.S.
- Listed height: 6 ft 4 in (1.93 m)
- Listed weight: 200 lb (91 kg)

Career information
- High school: Greene Central (Snow Hill, North Carolina)
- College: Louisburg College (1984–1986); East Carolina (1986–1989)
- NBA draft: 1989: 1st round, 21st overall pick
- Drafted by: Utah Jazz
- Playing career: 1989–2001
- Position: Shooting guard / small forward
- Number: 30, 32

Career history
- 1989–1992: Utah Jazz
- 1992–1994: Milwaukee Bucks
- 1994–1995: Boston Celtics
- 1995: Utah Jazz
- 1995–1998: Vancouver Grizzlies
- 1999: Miami Heat
- 1999–2000: Olympiacos
- 2000–2001: Dafni

Career highlights
- NBA All-Rookie Second Team (1990); CAA Player of the Year (1989); First-team All-CAA (1989)

Career NBA statistics
- Points: 7,585 (10.8 ppg)
- Rebounds: 2,376 (3.4 rpg)
- Assists: 1,409 (3.0 apg)
- Stats at NBA.com
- Stats at Basketball Reference

Theodore "Blue" Edwards (born October 31, 1965) is an American former professional basketball player who played ten seasons in the National Basketball Association (NBA). Edwards now coaches at his alma mater, Greene Central High School in Snow Hill, North Carolina.

== Early life ==
Edwards' hometown was Walstonburg, North Carolina. He attended Greene Central High School, in Snow Hill, North Carolina where he played on the basketball team.

== College basketball career ==
From 1984 to 1986, Edwards played basketball at Louisburg College in Louisburg, North Carolina.

In the late 1980s, he played for East Carolina University. In 1988–89, Edwards scored 773 points, the most points in a single season for ECU. He also finished sixth in the nation in scoring.

In 1987, Edwards was suspended from the season after being found guilty of breaking and entering. In 1994, Edwards became a member of the East Carolina University Athletics Hall of Fame.

== NBA career ==
He was selected by the Utah Jazz with the 21st overall pick of the 1989 NBA draft out of East Carolina University and was a member of the 1990 NBA All-Rookie 2nd team. He was traded to the Milwaukee Bucks in 1992 and tied for scoring with Frank Brickowski for the Milwaukee Bucks during the 1992–93 season with 16.9 points per game (although at 16.85, Edwards' average was slightly lower than Brickowski's 16.89).

Edwards was selected by the Vancouver Grizzlies with the 26th selection in the 1995 NBA expansion draft, having been left unprotected by the Utah Jazz. He recorded the first triple-double in the history of the Vancouver Grizzlies (also his first) on March 1, 1996, against the Dallas Mavericks with 15 points, 13 rebounds and 11 assists. In the Grizzlies' first season, he ranked fourth overall in points per game (12.7).

Edwards won several games with last-second shots, including a game winning bucket against the Minnesota Timberwolves that ended the Grizzlies' 23-game losing streak. The shot prevented the Grizzlies from tying the National Basketball Association record for most consecutive losses. He also hit a last-second game winning shot against the Philadelphia 76ers. He was also the only Grizzly to play and start all 82 games.

Due to Edwards' dunking ability, he was invited to the 1990 NBA Slam Dunk Contest in which he did not take part due to injury, and was replaced by David Benoit. However, he did take part in the 1991 event, placing 6th. Edwards wore number 30 throughout his career until he moved to the Miami Heat where he wore 32 as 30 was in use by Terry Porter.

After his NBA career, Edwards played overseas.

== NBA career statistics ==
Legend
GP	Games played	GS	Games started	MPG	Minutes per game
FG%	Field goal percentage	3P%	3-point field goal percentage	FT%	Free throw percentage
RPG	Rebounds per game	APG	Assists per game	SPG	Steals per game
BPG	Blocks per game	PPG	Points per game	**Bold**	Career high
*	Led the league

=== Regular season ===
Year	Team	GP	GS	MPG	FG%	3P%	FT%	RPG	APG	SPG	BPG	PPG
1989–90	Utah	**82**	49	23.0	.507	.300	.719	3.1	1.8	0.9	0.4	8.9
1990–91	Utah	62	56	26.0	**.526**	.250	.701	3.2	1.7	0.9	0.5	9.3
1991–92	Utah	81	81	28.2	.522	.379	.774	3.7	1.7	1.0	**0.6**	12.6
1992–93	Milwaukee	**82**	81	33.3	.512	.349	.790	**4.7**	**2.6**	**1.6**	0.5	**16.9**
1993–94	Milwaukee	**82**	64	28.3	.478	.358	.799	4.0	2.1	1.0	0.3	11.6
1994–95	Boston	31	7	16.4	.426	.256	**.896**	2.1	1.5	0.6	0.3	7.1
1994–95	Utah	36	0	16.8	.495	.344	.762	1.8	0.8	0.7	0.2	6.6
1995–96	Vancouver	**82**	**82***	**33.8**	.419	.343	.755	4.2	**2.6**	1.4	**0.6**	12.7
1996–97	Vancouver	61	12	23.6	.397	.281	.817	3.1	1.9	0.6	0.3	7.8
1997–98	Vancouver	81	20	24.3	.439	.333	.837	2.7	2.5	1.1	0.3	10.8
1998–99	Miami	24	0	11.8	.444	**.400**	.692	1.4	1.3	0.7	0.2	3.2
Career		704	452	26.1	.475	.335	.779	3.4	2.0	1.0	0.4	10.8

=== Playoffs ===
Year	Team	GP	GS	MPG	FG%	3P%	FT%	RPG	APG	SPG	BPG	PPG
1989–90	Utah	5	0	18.8	**.538**	.333	**.875**	**3.6**	1.6	**1.4**	**0.4**	7.2
1990–91	Utah	9	**9**	**26.8**	.481	.500	.800	3.1	**1.8**	0.9	0.1	**10.1**
1991–92	Utah	**16**	7	22.1	.468	.200	.719	3.2	1.1	**1.4**	0.2	8.1
1994-95	Utah	4	0	8.3	.333	**1.000**	.000	1.5	0.8	0.5	0.0	2.3
Career		34	16	21.2	.473	.313	.767	3.0	1.3	1.2	0.2	7.8

== Child custody issue ==
At the end of 2001, Edwards was involved in a highly publicized child custody case in Canada. While playing for the Vancouver Grizzlies in the spring of 1996, Edwards, who was married, started an affair with Canadian citizen Kimberly Van de Perre. He had at least two other affairs. During the affair with Kimberly, she became pregnant and gave birth to a baby boy named Elijah, in June 1997. When Elijah was three months old, Ms. Van de Perre began proceedings for custody and child support, naming Edwards as the father of the child. Edwards responded initially by seeking joint custody and liberal access, but later changed his response to seek sole custody.

After a lengthy trial that ran from the fall of 1998 to early 1999, the trial judge released his decision and awarded sole custody to the mother. Edwards was given considerable access — four one-week periods quarterly throughout the year, shared time at Christmas and on Elijah's birthday and additional access upon short notice when he was in Vancouver. Edwards appealed this decision.

During the hearing at the British Columbia Court of Appeal, the Court invited Mrs. Edwards to apply to be admitted as a party and to request joint custody of Elijah with her husband. Mrs. Edwards is also an African American. This new, joint application for custody was successful, and Elijah was placed in the custody of Edwards and his wife.

The Court of Appeal's decision was stayed to allow the mother the opportunity to seek leave to appeal to the Supreme Court of Canada, with the result that Elijah remained primarily in his mother's care throughout these proceedings. In 2001 the Supreme Court of Canada restored the trial decision and awarded custody to Elijah's mother; the Court concluded that in this case there was no evidence introduced that race should be "an important consideration". After the Supreme Court affirmed that the mother should have sole custody, the father ceased visiting and paying child support.

In 2009, the Canadian Television Network produced and aired a made-for-TV movie based on the custody battle story entitled "Playing for Keeps", which is released in the US under the title "What Color Is Love?".
