= Little Contentnea Creek =

Stream in North Carolina, USA

Little Contentnea Creek Tributary to Contentnea Creek
- Location of Little Contentnea Creek mouth Little Contentnea Creek (the United States)

Location
- Country: United States
- State: North Carolina
- County: Pitt; Greene; Wilson
- City: Farmville

Physical characteristics
- Source: Whiteoak Swamp divide
  - location: about 1 mile northeast of Saratoga, North Carolina
  - coordinates: 35°38′51″N 077°44′01″W
  - elevation: 36 ft (11 m)
- Mouth: Contentnea Creek
  - location: about 1.5 miles northeast of Fountain Hill, North Carolina
  - coordinates: 35°25′37″N 077°28′42″W
  - elevation: 5 ft (1.5 m)
- Length: 33.65 mi (54.15 km)
- Basin size: 182.62 square miles (473.0 km^{2})
- Discharge
  - location: Contentnea Creek
  - average: 199.87 cu ft/s (5.660 m^{3}/s) at mouth with Contentnea Creek

Basin features
- Progression: Contentnea Creek → Neuse River → Pamlico Sound → Atlantic Ocean
- River system: Neuse River
- Tributaries
  - left: Jacob Run; Oldwoman Branch
  - right: Thompson Swamp; Sandy Run
- Bridges: NC 222, Galloway Road, Eagles Cross Road, Moseley Road, Bell Road, US 264, Lewis Store Road, Edward May Road, US 258, NC 121, Wesley Church Road, Chinquapin Road, US 13, Waterside Church Road, NC 903

Little Contentnea Creek is a 33.65 mi (54.15 km) long 4th order tributary to Contentnea Creek in Pitt County, North Carolina.

== Course ==
Little Contentnea Creek rises about 1 mile northeast of Saratoga, North Carolina and then flows south-southeast to join Contentnea Creek about 1.5 miles northeast of Fountain Hill.

== Watershed ==
Little Contentnea Creek drains 182.62 square miles (473.0 km^{2}) of area, receives about 48.9 in/year of precipitation, has a wetness index of 592.44, and is about 17% forested.
