= Wheat Swamp (Contentnea Creek tributary) =

Stream in North Carolina, USA

Wheat Swamp Tributary to Contentnea Creek
- Location of Wheat Swamp mouth Wheat Swamp (Contentnea Creek tributary) (the United States)

Location
- Country: United States
- State: North Carolina
- County: Lenoir; Greene

Physical characteristics
- Source: Tyson Marsh divide
  - location: about 2 miles northeast of Institute, North Carolina
  - coordinates: 35°22′28″N 077°41′49″W
  - elevation: 33 ft (10 m)
- Mouth: Contentnea Creek
  - location: about 0.5 miles E of Hookerton, North Carolina
  - coordinates: 35°25′09″N 077°33′11″W
  - elevation: 7 ft (2.1 m)
- Length: 13.97 mi (22.48 km)
- Basin size: 29.61 square miles (76.7 km^{2})
- Discharge
  - location: Contentnea Creek
  - average: 34.21 cu ft/s (0.969 m^{3}/s) at mouth with Contentnea Creek

Basin features
- Progression: Contentnea Creek → Neuse River → Pamlico Sound → Atlantic Ocean
- River system: Neuse River
- Tributaries
  - left: unnamed tributaries
  - right: unnamed tributaries
- Waterbodies: Pulley Pond
- Bridges: John Harrison Road, Gregory Road, US 258, NC 58, Mike Stocks Road, Oakes Road, Hugo Road

Wheat Swamp is a 13.97 mi (22.48 km) long 3rd order tributary to Contentnea Creek in Lenoir and Greene Counties, North Carolina. This stream forms the boundary of Lenoir and Greene Counties, in part.

== Variant names ==
According to the Geographic Names Information System, it has also been known historically as:

- Wheat Swamp Creek

== Course ==
Wheat Swamp rises about 2 miles northeast of Institute, North Carolina and then flows southeast and curves northeast to join Contentnea Creek about 0.5 miles northeast of Hookerton.

== Watershed ==
Wheat Swamp drains 29.61 square miles (76.7 km^{2}) of area, receives about 49.8 in/year of precipitation, has a wetness index of 584.92, and is about 13% forested.
