= Edward R. and Sallie Ann Coward House =

Historic house in North Carolina, United States

- U.S. National Register of Historic Places
- Location within North Carolina Location within the United States
- Location: NC 1405, 0.2 miles E of jct. with NC 1400, near Ormondsville, North Carolina
- Coordinates: 35°26′59″N 77°32′49″W
- Area: 1.7 acres (0.69 ha)
- Built by: William Pittman
- Architectural style: Greek Revival
- NRHP reference No.: 02000131
- Added to NRHP: March 6, 2002

Edward R. and Sallie Ann Coward House is a historic home located 0.2 miles east of the junction of NC 1400 near Ormondsville, Greene County, North Carolina. It was designed by William S. Pittman and built in about 1850, and is a two-story, single pile, three bay, Greek Revival style heavy timber frame dwelling. It has a one-story rear ell and low hip roof.

It was listed on the National Register of Historic Places in 2002.
