= Zachariah School =

Historic school building in North Carolina, United States

- U.S. National Register of Historic Places
- Location within North Carolina Location within the United States
- Location: NC 1239, 0.6 miles S o NC 1244, near Wooten's Crossroads, North Carolina
- Coordinates: 35°31′28″N 77°41′53″W
- Area: 1 acre (0.40 ha)
- Built: 1920-1921
- Architectural style: Rosenwald School
- NRHP reference No.: 05000377
- Added to NRHP: May 4, 2005

Zachariah School is a historic Rosenwald School building near Wooten's Crossroads, Greene County, North Carolina. It was built in 1920 and is a one-story, frame building sheathed in weatherboard and containing three classrooms. An auditorium was added in 1921 but removed about 1967–1969. Zachariah School closed in 1956. The Zachariah School is one of five schools constructed using Rosenwald funds in Greene County, including the Snow Hill Colored High School.

It was listed on the National Register of Historic Places in 2005.
