= Buckhorn Reservoir =

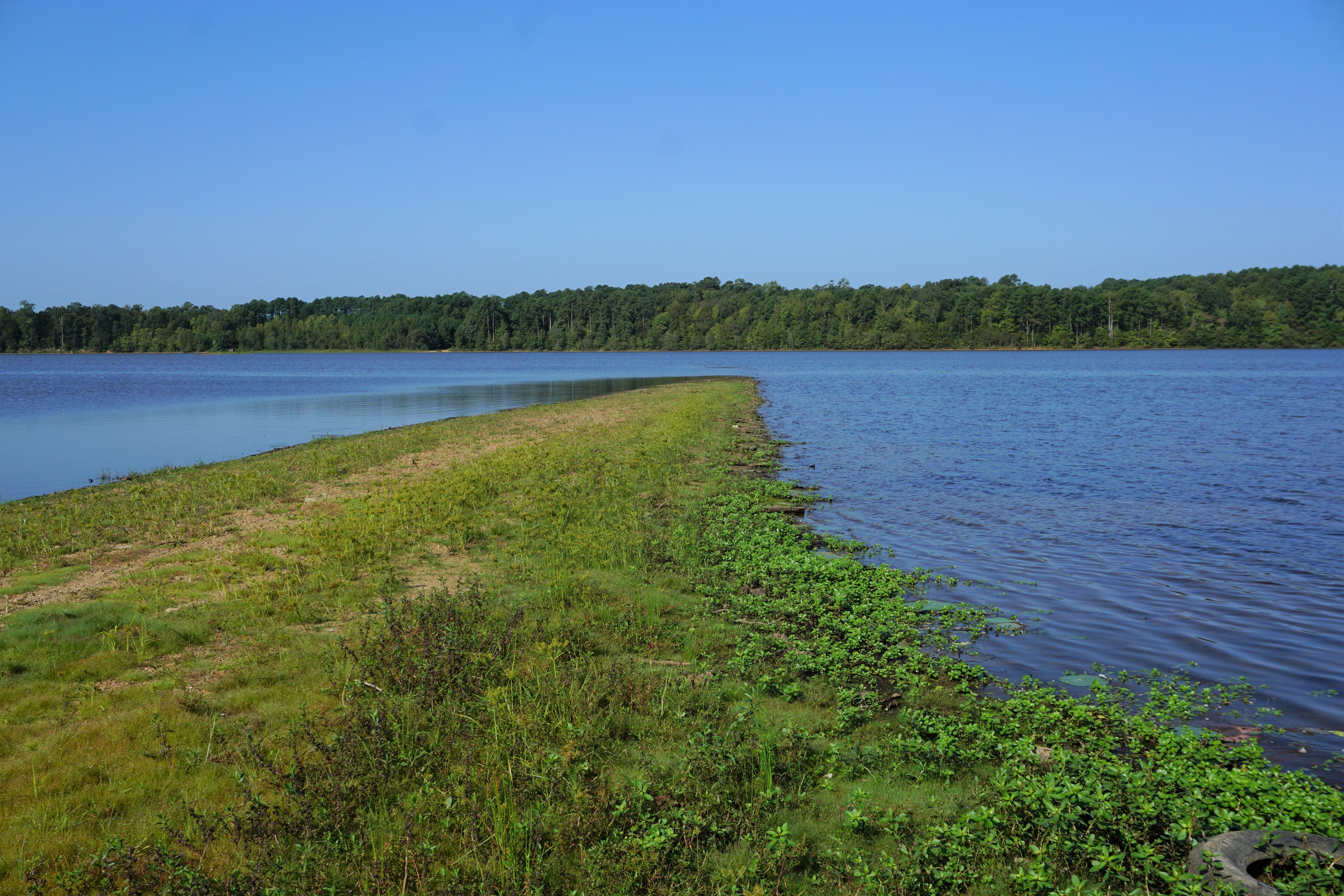
- Wetlands in the reservoir

- Location within North Carolina Location within the United States
- Location: Wilson County, North Carolina
- Coordinates: 35°41′29″N 078°07′12″W
- Type: reservoir
- Primary inflows: Turkey Creek and Moccasin Creek
- Primary outflows: Contentnea Creek
- Basin countries: United States
- Surface area: 2,300 acres (9.3 km^{2})
- Surface elevation: 146 ft (45 m)

Buckhorn Reservoir is a reservoir in Wilson County, North Carolina, USA, created by the Buckhorn Dam. The reservoir is the primary water supply for the city of Wilson. The original Buckhorn Dam was built in 1974, 1,000 feet (300 m) upstream from the current dam. The reservoir at that time had the ability to contain 800 million US gallons (3,000,000 m^{3}) of water. In 1999, a new dam was constructed downstream from the older dam creating the new Buckhorn Reservoir which covers an area of 2,300 acres (9.3 km^{2}) and has a capacity of 7 billion US gallons (26,000,000 m^{3}) when fully filled.

The dam is one-half mile long and was built with expansion in mind. The top of the dam was built to an elevation of 159 feet (48 m) above sea level, and the lake is filled to the 148-foot (45 m) elevation.

The reservoir is primarily fed by two streams, Turkey Creek and Moccasin Creek, and to a lesser extent by Bull Branch, Little Creek, and Moccasin Creek. Water to be treated is not drawn from the reservoir itself. The outflow travels down Contentnea Creek to the Wiggins Mill reservoir, where the water is treated at the Wiggins Mill Water Treatment Plant.
