= Benjamin W. Best House =

Historic house in North Carolina, United States

- U.S. National Register of Historic Places
- Location within North Carolina Location within the United States
- Location: 2193 Mewborn Church Road (SR 1146), near Jason, North Carolina
- Coordinates: 35°24′42″N 77°45′43″W
- Area: 3 acres (1.2 ha)
- Built: c. 1850
- Architectural style: Greek Revival
- NRHP reference No.: 05000349
- Added to NRHP: February 3, 2006

Benjamin W. Best House is a historic house located near Jason, Greene County, North Carolina.

== Description and history ==
It was built about 1850, and is a two-story, three-bay, Greek Revival style heavy timber frame dwelling. It has a two-story rear ell and low hip roof. When threatened with demolition, it was moved to its present location in 1998.

It was listed on the National Register of Historic Places on February 3, 2006.
