= Jason, North Carolina =

Unincorporated community in North Carolina, US

Coordinates: 35°22′53″N 77°46′27″W

Jason is a small unincorporated community in eastern North Carolina, United States, in Greene County. Incorporated in 1885, Jason is an agricultural based community with town water system and volunteer fire service. Jason is located roughly halfway between Snow Hill and LaGrange on Highway 903. First named Aloc, meaning "leave alone" by the Tuscarora Indian tribe, Jason was settled by the Hardy, Mewborn, Aldridge and Kearney families. There was also a cotton mill on the northern side of town, which was one of the first in Greene County.

The Benjamin W. Best House was listed on the National Register of Historic Places in 2006.
