= Greene County Schools (North Carolina) =

School district in North Carolina, United States

Green County Schools

Location
- Greene County, North Carolina United States

District information
- Type: Public
- Grades: PK–12
- Superintendent: Patrick C. Miller
- Asst. superintendent(s): Pat MacNeill
- Schools: 6
- Budget: $ 35,153,000
- NCES District ID: 3701830

Students and staff
- Students: 3,348
- Teachers: 231.29 (on FTE basis)
- Staff: 249.45 (on FTE basis)
- Student–teacher ratio: 14.48:1

Other information
- Website: www.gcsedu.org

Green County Schools is a PK–12 graded school district serving Greene County, North Carolina. Its six schools serve 3,348 students as of the 2010–11 school year.

== History ==
African Americans often made up the majority of the student population in the county schools. In 1959, Black students accounted for 54% of the system's enrollment. That year, after a bond referendum was passed the previous year to build a new White-only school in the county, a boycott was begun of the school system on February 10. The next day, 34 of the bus drivers refused to run their routes. The strike lasted four days and affected approximately 2800 black students in the county. It was resolved after parents were able to meet with school board members and work to move up the date for voting on a bond referendum for improvements to the county's Black high school.

In 2005, former Senator John Edwards established a model scholarship program in the Green County Schools system that he touted during his 2008 US presidential campaign. The College for Everyone program was administered by Edwards' Center for Promise and Opportunity Foundation. After Edwards lost his bid for the Democratic Party nomination, he ended the program in 2008.

== Student demographics ==
For the 2010–11 school year, Green County Schools had a total population of 3,348 students and 249.45 teachers on a (FTE) basis. This produced a student-teacher ratio of 14.48:1. That same year, out of the student total, the gender ratio was 51% male to 49% female. The demographic group makeup was: Black, 41%; White, 32%; Hispanic, 25%; American Indian, 0%; and Asian/Pacific Islander, 0% (two or more races: 1%). For the same school year, 77.91% of the students received free and reduced-cost lunches.

== Governance ==
The primary governing body of Green County Schools follows a council–manager government format with a five-member Board of Education appointing a Superintendent to run the day-to-day operations of the system. The school system currently resides in the North Carolina State Board of Education's Second District.

=== Board of education ===
The five members of the Board of Education generally meet on the second and fourth Mondays of each month. The board members are elected to four-year staggered terms and are partisan offices. The current members of the board are: Pat Adams, Jasper Barfield, Jr., Leisa Batts, Joe Smith, and Tina West Murphy. All are Democratic Party members.

=== Superintendent ===
The superintendent of the system is Patrick C. Miller. He was hired to the position in 2008 after former superintendent Stephen Mazingo left to become headmaster of Arendell Parrott Academy in Kinston, North Carolina. Miller had previously worked for the Green County Schools system at both the elementary and high schools. Pat MacNeill is the assistant superintendent.

== Member schools ==
Green County Schools has six schools ranging from pre-kindergarten to twelfth grade. Those nine schools are separated into two high schools (Greene Central High School and Greene County Early College High School) and one each of a middle school (Green County Middle School; grades 6–8), intermediate school (Green County Intermediate School; grades 4–5), elementary school (West Green Elementary School; grades 2–3), and primary school (Snow Hill Primary School; grades PK–1). All schools are located in Snow Hill.

Among the newest schools built are the early college, opened in 2006 through a partnership with Lenoir Community College, and the intermediate school, which opened in 2012.

In April, 2011, tornadoes in the area completely demolished the middle school. The students finished the year at the county's high school. Modular units were erected for the next school year. Reconstruction of the building should be completed by May, 2013.

=== Former schools ===
Former schools in the district include the Snow Hill Colored High School, a Rosenwald School built in the 1920s, which served African American students in Green County. It ceased operations as a school after desegregation. The property is now owned by Lenoir Community College and was listed on the National Register of Historic Places on August 28, 2003 (NRHP Reference#:03000853).

== Awards ==
The Greene County Schools system has had one school recognized as a Blue Ribbon School: Snow Hill Primary School (1998–99). Greene County Intermediate School won an award for their Leadership in Energy and Environmental Design (LEED) blueprint. They took the first place award in Excellence in Architectural Design category by the North Carolina School Boards Association.

== See also ==
- List of school districts in North Carolina
