= Hardee House =

Historic house in North Carolina, United States

- U.S. National Register of Historic Places
- Location within North Carolina Location within the United States
- Location: 515 L.A. Moye Rd., near Ormondsville, North Carolina
- Coordinates: 35°29′13″N 77°31′30″W
- Area: 3 acres (1.2 ha)
- Built: c. 1842-1844
- Architectural style: Greek Revival, Queen Anne
- NRHP reference No.: 14000703
- Added to NRHP: September 22, 2014

Hardee House is a historic home located near Ormondsville, Greene County, North Carolina. It was built between about 1842 and 1844, and is a two-story, single pile, three bay, Greek Revival style I-house dwelling. It has an early-20th century Queen Anne style front porch with turned posts and decorative sawnwork brackets. Also on the property is a contributing 2 1/2-story gable-roof tobacco pack house.

It was listed on the National Register of Historic Places in 2014.
