= St. Barnabas Episcopal Church (Snow Hill, North Carolina) =

- U.S. National Register of Historic Places
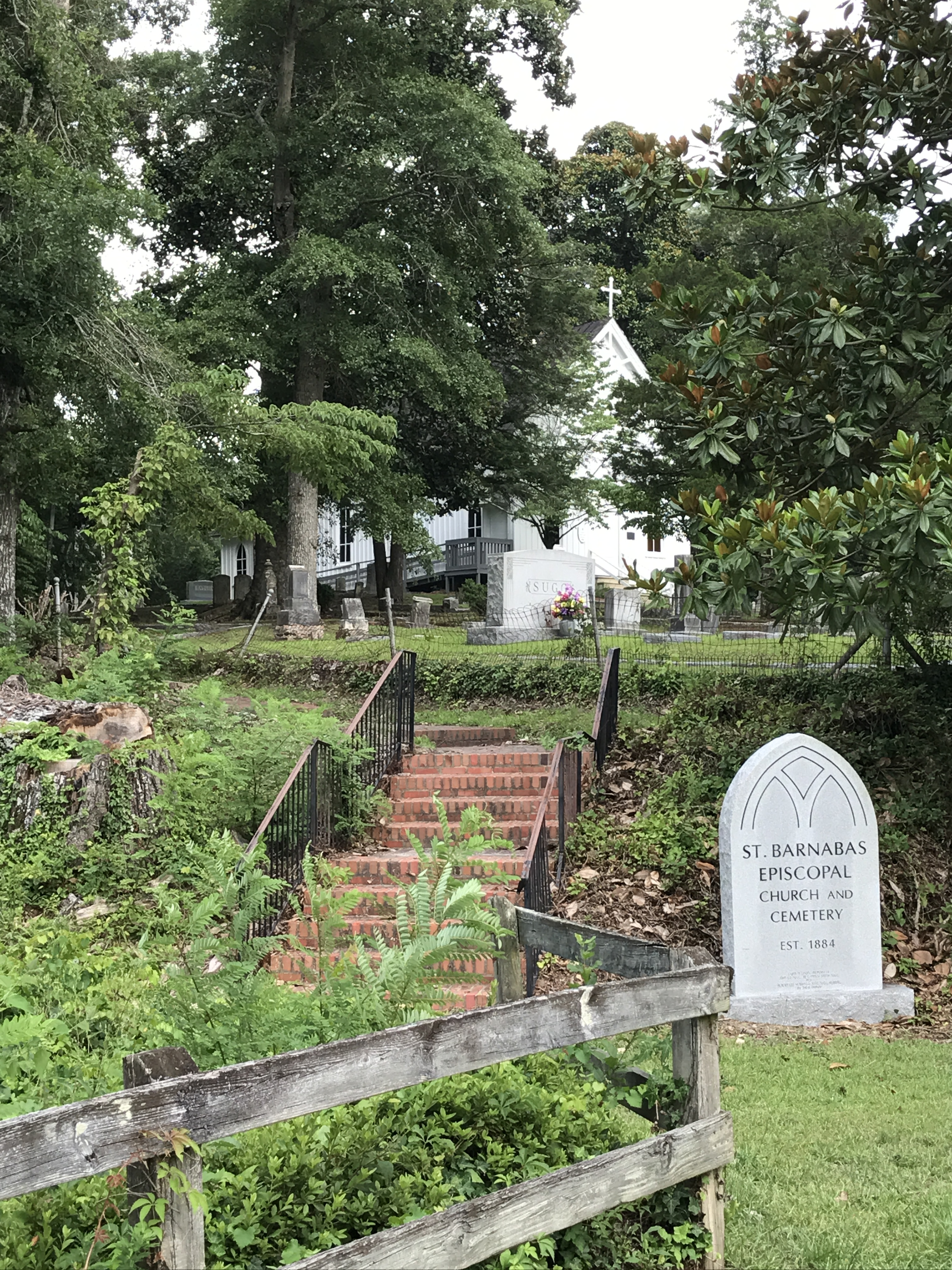
- Front yard of the church

- Location within North Carolina Location within the United States
- Location: SE 4th St. and St. Barnabas Rd., Snow Hill, North Carolina
- Coordinates: 35°27′5″N 77°40′15″W
- Area: 2.5 acres (1.0 ha)
- Built: 1887
- Architect: Faircloth, W.T.; Porter & Godwin
- Architectural style: Gothic Revival
- NRHP reference No.: 79003337
- Added to NRHP: October 10, 1979

St. Barnabas Episcopal Church is a historic Episcopal church located at SE 4th Street and St. Barnabas Road in Snow Hill, Greene County, North Carolina. It was built in 1887, and is a small, rectangular, Carpenter Gothic style frame building. It sits on a low brick foundation and has a steep gable roof. Though the sixteenth church built in Greene County, it was the only Episcopal church in Greene County for seventy-five years.

== History ==
The Episcopal Diocese of East Carolina was formed by the General Convention of the Episcopal Church on October 22, 1883. In the following December, John D. Grimsley represented the congregation of St. Barnabas at a convention held at Christ Church in New Bern, North Carolina, to organize the newly formed diocese. A new congregation formed in Snow Hill was assigned to the Rev. Israel Harding as part of his circuit of churches. By May 1884, Harding officiated four services in Snow Hill, despite the lack of a church building. At that time, the earliest services were held in the Green County Courthouse, but later the Baptist Church allowed the congregation to use its facilities. There was always the intention to build a house of worship. Bishop Alfred Watson, after delivering a sermon in the courthouse on October 24, 1884, spoke with members of the congregation regarding the erection of a church. Two and one-half acres owned by Aquilla Sugg were acquired by the Diocese in 1883, but no funds were available for construction. Using funds raised locally, John D. Grimsley, William E. Best, John Harvey, and Theophilus Edwards brokered a deal with W. T. Faircloth and the firm of Porter and Godwin to construct the building, which was completed in 1887. The new church was named St. Barnabas, which had been the name of the congregation.

The Rev. Israel Harding remained the priest in charge of St. Barnabas until his death in 1891. The church was not consecrated during Harding's lifetime because a canon of the Episcopal Church withheld the consecration of a parish until it had paid off its debt. The final loan payment was made in early 1893, and on April 23 of that year, Bishop Alfred Watson consecrated St. Barnabas in honor of Israel Harding.

In 1952, sparks from the wood stove ignited the shingle roofing underneath the tin covering. The tin prevented the fire from destroying the church. G. Frank Warren, the treasurer of St. Barnabas from 1938 to 1962, had the damaged roof replaced with timber cut to resemble the original woodwork.

Over time, the older members of the church passed away and, the Diocese became increasingly reluctant to assign a regular minister to the congregation. The number of communicants dwindled, until in 1962, the Diocese could no longer justify keeping the church active.

In 1971, five teenage boys entered the abandoned church and wrecked the interior. The stained glass window over the altar was broken; hymn books were torn and used as projectiles to destroy the glass light fixtures; a hole was knocked in the ceiling; swinging doors to the vestibule were ripped to shreds; roofing cement was poured on the floor, carpet, and pews; the baptismal font was chipped and broken; covers for the kneelers were split open; the pump organ (which had been converted to electricity) was damaged beyond estimation; and the church and grounds were littered with beer cans and other debris.

Today, St. Barnabas is no longer a parish and currently meets only twice a year, on a Saturday near the feast day of St. Barnabas and another Saturday in October, celebrating the Holy Eucharist from the 1928 American Book of Common Prayer. Its last service as a parish was held in 1962.

St. Barnabas is under the pastoral care of St. Mary's Episcopal Church in Kinston, North Carolina.

It was listed on the National Register of Historic Places in 1979.
