= Eagle Swamp =

Stream in North Carolina, USA

Eagle Swamp Tributary to Contentnea Creek
- Location of Eagle Swamp mouth Eagle Swamp (the United States)

Location
- Country: United States
- State: North Carolina
- County: Lenoir

Physical characteristics
- Source: Wheat Swamp divide
  - location: pond at Hugo, North Carolina
  - coordinates: 35°23′26″N 077°31′52″W
  - elevation: 22 ft (6.7 m)
- Mouth: Contentnea Creek
  - location: Tick Bite, North Carolina
  - coordinates: 35°21′05″N 077°25′37″W
  - elevation: 1 ft (0.30 m)
- Length: 7.38 mi (11.88 km)
- Basin size: 10.07 square miles (26.1 km^{2})
- Discharge
  - location: Contentnea Creek
  - average: 12.07 cu ft/s (0.342 m^{3}/s) at mouth with Contentnea Creek

Basin features
- Progression: Contentnea Creek → Neuse River → Pamlico Sound → Atlantic Ocean
- River system: Neuse River
- Tributaries
  - left: unnamed tributaries
  - right: unnamed tributaries
- Bridges: Sharon Church Road, Skeeter Pond Road, NC 11, S Highland Avenue, Tick Bite Road

Eagle Swamp is a 7.38 mi (11.88 km) long 3rd order tributary to Contentnea Creek in Lenoir County, North Carolina.

== Course ==
Eagle Swamp rises in Hugo, North Carolina and then flows southeast to join Contentnea Creek at Tick Bite.

== Watershed ==
Eagle Swamp drains 10.07 square miles (26.1 km^{2}) of area, receives about 49.9 in/year of precipitation, has a wetness index of 595.43, and is about 15% forested.
