= VMSB-343 =

Marine Scout Bombing Squadron 342
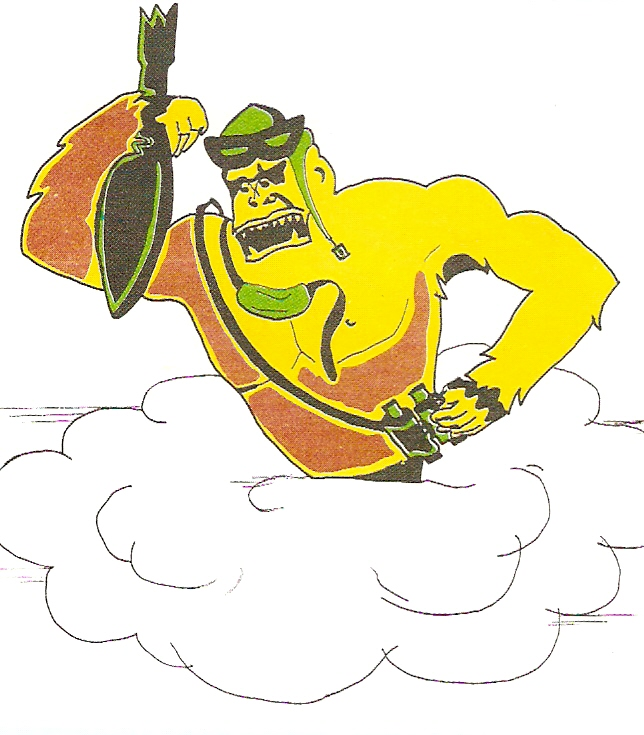
- VMSB-343 Insignia
- Active: August 1, 1943 – June 10, 1946
- Country: United States
- Branch: USMC
- Type: Dive Bomber squadron
- Role: Reconnaissance; Air Interdiction; Close air support
- Part of: Inactive
- Nickname(s): Gregory's Gorillas

Aircraft flown
- Bomber: SBD Dauntless; SB2C Helldiver

Marine Scout Bombing Squadron 343 (VMSB-343) was a dive bomber squadron of the United States Marine Corps. Nicknamed "Gregory's Gorillas", it saw limited action during World War II due to being assigned to fly anti-submarine patrols from Midway Atoll during its only deployed tour. After the war, the squadron later took part in the occupation of Northern China then returned to the United States to be decommissioned on June 10, 1946. To date, no other Marine Corps squadron has carried the lineage and honors of VMSB-343.

== History ==
=== Formation & training ===
Marine Scout Bombing Squadron 343 was commissioned at Marine Corps Auxiliary Airfield Atlantic, North Carolina on August 1, 1943. The squadron transferred to Marine Corps Outlying Field Greenville on December 1, 1943 and trained there until July 15, 1944, when the squadron boarded trains bound for the West Coast. The squadron departed Marine Corps Air Station Miramar on August 31, 1944 onboard the USS Altamaha (CVE-18) bound for Marine Corps Air Station Ewa, Hawaii.

=== Midway ===
On October 27 the squadron's Curtiss SB2C Helldivers began the 1,100-mile (1,800 km) flight to Midway Atoll stopping to refuel at French Frigate Shoals en route. The flight crews flew via Curtiss R5Cs. The squadron operated off of Eastern Island providing anti-submarine patrols as part of the Hawaiian Sea Frontier. In April 1945, the squadron transferred to Sand Island where they would remain until the end of the war. On August 11, 1945, the squadron boarded the USS Colusa (APA-74) to return to MCAS Ewa.

=== Northern China ===
After returning to Hawaii many of the original members of VMSB-343 rotated home. The squadron was reformed with the addition of numerous personnel from VMSB-241 that were also rotating back through Hawaii. In September 1945, the squadron set sail for China onboard the USS Arneb. During the voyage the ship endured Typhoon Louise off the coast of Okinawa. The Arneb arrived at Jiaozhou Bay, Tsingtao, where the squadron unloaded and began operations at Tsang Kou Airfield, a former Japanese Airfield. The squadron began flying show-of-strength patrols on November 1, 1945. On December 8, Marine Aircraft Group 32 was tasked to fly an aerial show of strength over the Shantung Peninsula on the anniversary of the attack on Pearl Harbor. Six of the squadron's twelve aircraft got caught in a blinding snowstorm flying beneath the clouds on the return to Tsingtao and crashed near Pingdu. Only two of the twelve squadron personnel involved in this flight survived, and two of the bodies were never recovered.

On May 16, 1946, 78 marines from the squadron were transferred to other MAG-32 units while the remaining 128 marines embarked on the USS General J. C. Breckinridge (AP-176) to return to the United States. The ship arrived at San Francisco on June 2, 1946. The squadron was decommissioned on June 10, 1946.

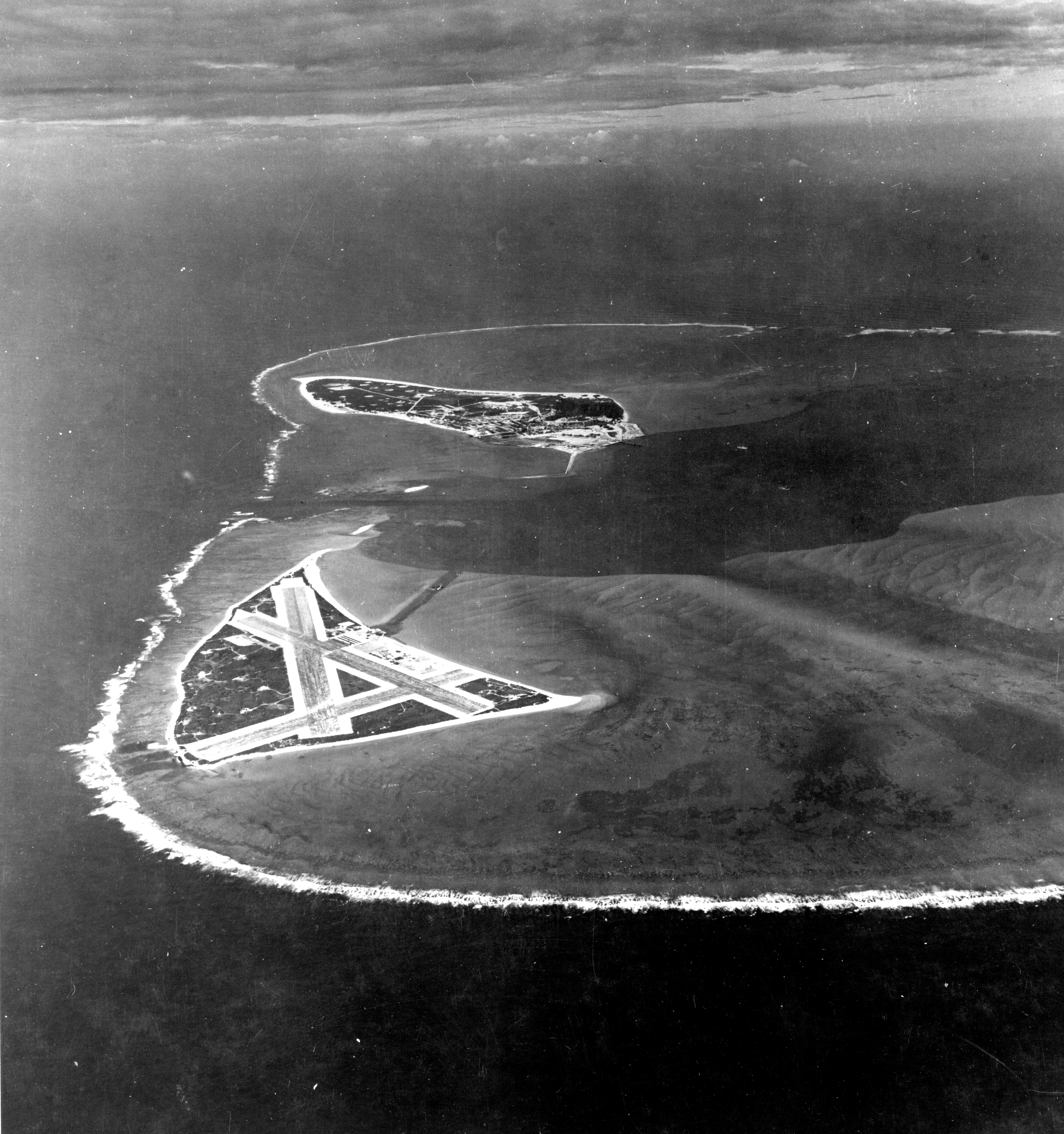
Overhead shot of Eastern Island on Midway Atoll

== Commanding Officers ==
The following officers commanded VMSB-343:

- Major Walter E. Gregory - August 1, 1943 - August 2, 1945
- Major Harold G. Schlendering - August 3, 1945 - August 17, 1945
- Major Perry H. Aliff - August 18, 1945 - August 30 - 1945
- Major Jack Cosley - August 31, 1945 - January 10, 1946
- Major Louis R. Buff - January 11, 1946 - May 16, 1946
- Major W. F. Cornell - May 18, 1946 - June 10, 1946

== Unit awards ==
Since the beginning of World War II, the United States military has honored various units for extraordinary heroism or outstanding non-combat service. The following are the known awards that VMSB-343 earned during their time in active service.

Streamer	Award	Year(s)	Additional Info
	World War II Victory Streamer	1942–1945	Pacific War
	Navy Occupation Service Streamer with "ASIA"		
	China Service Streamer	Sept 1946 - May 1947	North China

== See also ==
- United States Marine Corps Aviation
- List of active United States Marine Corps aircraft squadrons
- List of decommissioned United States Marine Corps aircraft squadrons
