= Contentnea Creek =

Stream in North Carolina, USA

Contentnea Creek Tributary to Neuse River
- Location of Contentnea Creek mouth

Location
- Country: United States
- State: North Carolina
- Counties: Pitt; Lenoir; Greene; Wilson
- Cities: Hookerton; Snow Hill; Stantonsburg; Wilson

Physical characteristics
- Source: Confluence of Moccasin and Turkey Creeks
  - location: about 1 miles east of Stilleys Crossroads
  - coordinates: 35°41′29″N 078°07′12″W
  - elevation: 136 ft (41 m)
- Mouth: Neuse River
  - location: Grifton, North Carolina
  - coordinates: 35°20′26″N 077°23′20″W
  - elevation: 3 ft (0.91 m)
- Length: 91.0 mi (146.5 km)
- Basin size: 1,017.58 square miles (2,635.5 km^{2})
- Discharge
  - location: Grifton, North Carolina
  - average: 1,094.14 cu ft/s (30.983 m^{3}/s) at mouth with Neuse River

Basin features
- Progression: Neuse River → Pamlico Sound → Atlantic Ocean
- River system: Neuse River
- Tributaries
  - left: Turkey Branch; Mill Branch; Marsh Swamp; Little Swamp; Mill Branch; Shepard Branch; Bloomery Swamp; Toisnot Swamp; Water Branch; Beaman Run; Mill Run; Panther Swamp; Beaverdam Run; Mullet Run; Polecat Run; Little Contentnea Creek; Grinnot Slough
  - right: Moccssin Branch; Little Creek; Buckhorn Branch; Marsh Swamp; Little Swamp; Black Creek; Nahunta Swamp; Fort Branch; Tyson Marsh; Shepherd Run; Rainbow Creek; Wheat Swamp; Eagle Swamp
- Waterbodies: Buckhorn Reservoir; Wiggins Mill Reservoir

Contentnea Creek is a major tributary of the Neuse River in North Carolina, USA. It is part of the Neuse River Basin, and flows for 91 miles between the Buckhorn Reservoir (confluence of Moccasin and Turkey Creeks), where it begins, and Grifton, North Carolina, where it flows into the Neuse River.

Contentnea Creek begins as the outflow of Buckhorn Reservoir 12 miles west of Wilson, North Carolina. From there it flows through the Wiggins Mill Reservoir on the southwest side of Wilson, past the towns of Stantonsburg and Snow Hill, and finally emptying into the Neuse River 3 miles southeast of Grifton.
