= Jim Ray Hart =

American baseball player (1941–2016)

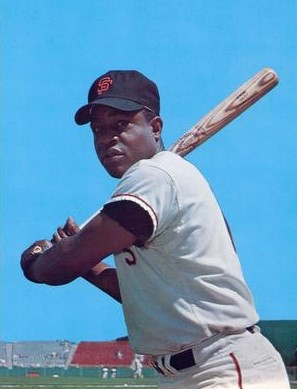
- Third baseman / Left fielder
- Born: October 30, 1941; Hookerton, North Carolina, U.S.
- Died: May 19, 2016 (aged 74); Acampo, California, U.S.
- Batted: Right Threw: Right

MLB debut
- July 7, 1963, for the San Francisco Giants

Last MLB appearance
- May 27, 1974, for the New York Yankees

MLB statistics
- Batting average: .278
- Home runs: 170
- Runs batted in: 578
- Stats at Baseball Reference

Teams
- San Francisco Giants (1963–1973); New York Yankees (1973–1974)

Career highlights and awards
- All-Star (1966); San Francisco Giants Wall of Fame

James Ray Hart (October 30, 1941 – May 19, 2016) was an American baseball player who was a third baseman in Major League Baseball. He played for the National League's San Francisco Giants from 1963 to 1973 and the American League's New York Yankees in 1973 and 1974. Hart batted and threw right-handed. In a 12-season career, Hart posted a .278 batting average, with 170 home runs and 578 runs batted in (RBI) in 1,125 major league games played.

== Early life ==
Hart was born on October 30, 1941, in Lenoir County, North Carolina to Amos and Essie Lee (Jones) Hart, who soon after moved to Hookerton where Amos worked as a sharecropper. He attended Snow Hill High School, and played semi-pro baseball.

== Career ==
Hart was signed as an amateur free agent in 1960 by the Giants for $1,000. He played in the Giants minor league system from 1960 to 1963. In 1962, with the Single-A Springfield Giants of the Eastern League, Hart had a .337 batting average with 18 home runs and 107 RBIs. He was named the Eastern League Most Valuable Player. In 1963, he hit .312 for the Triple-A Tacoma Giants of the Pacific Coast League in 83 games.

Hart was called up to the Giants in 1963. In one of his earliest games, on July 7, 1963, St. Louis Cardinal pitcher Bob Gibson hit Hart with a pitch, breaking Hart's left shoulder, causing him to miss five weeks. Teammate Willie Mays had tried to warn him about "digging in" against Gibson, to no avail. Four days after returning to play in 1963, Cardinals pitcher Curt Simmons hit Hart again, giving him a concussion, resulting in ongoing headaches that finished Hart's season. The following spring training, Giants manager Alvin Dark worked with Hart on how to avoid being hit by pitches.

In 1964, his first full year with the Giants, Hart hit .286, with 31 home runs, and 81 RBIs. He came in second in rookie of the year voting (behind future hall of fame player Dick Allen and tied with Rico Carty), and 18th in voting for most valuable player.

In 1965, Hart was fined and suspended by Giants' manager Herman Franks after breaking curfew. Some of his teammates feared he was becoming an alcoholic, and Giants' captain Willie Mays had a talk with him. Mays told him, "If you play for me for six days, I'll give you one day," meaning if Hart was ready to play during the week, Mays would give him a bottle of Old Crow each Monday. "He was ready to play every day," Mays reported, and he gave Hart five hundred dollars out of his own pocket after the season for always being ready. Hart hit .299, with 23 home runs and 96 RBIs in 1965, and was 15th in MVP voting.

In 1966, Hart hit .285 with 33 home runs and 93 RBIs. He was also selected to the National League All-Star Team.

He was named NL Player of the Month in July 1967(.355, 13 HR, 30 RBIs). While Hart played primarily at third base in 1964 (149 games, with 28 errors), 1965 (144 games, with a league leading 32 errors) and 1966 (139 games with 24 errors), in 1967 he played only 89 games at third base and 73 games in left field; still committing 16 errors at third base, but only two in the outfield. He hit .289, with 29 home runs and 99 RBIs, and was 17th in MVP voting.

Hart had a reputation as a poor defensive player at third base. He finished second, first and second among National League third basemen in errors in his first three full seasons in the majors (1964–66), never playing as many as 90 games at third in a season after that. In The New Bill James Historical Baseball Abstract, Bill James ranks Hart as the 74th-best third baseman of all time, writing about him, "A better hitter than 59 of the 73 men listed ahead of him at third base. This should tell you all you need to know about his defense."

Hart's batting average fell to .258 in 1968, splitting time between third base and left field. He only played in 136 games, the first time he had played less than 153 games in a full season for the Giants. From 1969 to 1972, he continued to play in fewer games (95, 76, 31, 24) for the Giants. In December 1970, Hart had surgery on his right shoulder, for a chronic degenerative condition. In October 1972, he had surgery on a cartilage tear in his left knee. Alcohol and weight control may also have played a part in his declining performance.

Hart hit for the cycle on July 8, 1970. That same day, he also became one of a select few players to have six RBIs in one inning. He did this by hitting a three-run triple and a three-run home run in the fifth inning of a game against the Atlanta Braves.

Hart's rights were sold to the Yankees on April 17, 1973. He hit .254, with 13 home runs and 52 RBIs in 114 games for the Yankees in 1973, but was released after playing in only 10 games in June 1974.

Following his release from the major leagues in 1974, Hart played in the Mexican League for part of 1974, as well as in 1975-1976 before retiring from baseball in 1976.

== Later life ==
Hart joined the Teamsters as a warehouseman for Safeway supermarkets in Richmond, California, and later in Tracy, California, when operations moved there in 1992; he retired from Safeway in 2006.

Hart died on May 19, 2016.

== See also ==
- List of Major League Baseball players to hit for the cycle

Awards and achievements
Preceded by Hank Aaron	Major League Player of the Month; July 1967	Succeeded by Orlando Cepeda
Preceded by Tommie Agee	Hitting for the cycle July 8, 1970	Succeeded by Freddie Patek
