= Snow Hill Colored High School =

Historic school building in North Carolina, United States

- U.S. National Register of Historic Places
- Location within North Carolina Location within the United States
- Location: 602A W. Harper St., Snow Hill, North Carolina
- Coordinates: 35°26′58″N 77°40′22″W
- Area: 5.6 acres (2.3 ha)
- Built: 1925, c. 1935
- Architectural style: Rosenwald School
- NRHP reference No.: 03000853
- Added to NRHP: August 28, 2003

Snow Hill Colored High School, also known as Greene County Colored Training School and Rosenwald Center for Cultural Enrichment, is a historic Rosenwald School building located at Snow Hill, Greene County, North Carolina. It was built in 1925, and is a one-story, seven-bay, H-shaped brick building. A six classroom addition was built about 1935. Also on the property are the contributing Mary M. Battle Monument (c. 1925) and baseball field (c. 1935, c. 1950). The Snow Hill Colored High School is one of five schools that were constructed using Rosenwald funds in Greene County, including the Zachariah School.

It was listed on the National Register of Historic Places in 2003.
