= Greene County Courthouse (North Carolina) =

Historic courthouse in North Carolina

- U.S. National Register of Historic Places
- U.S. Historic district – Contributing property
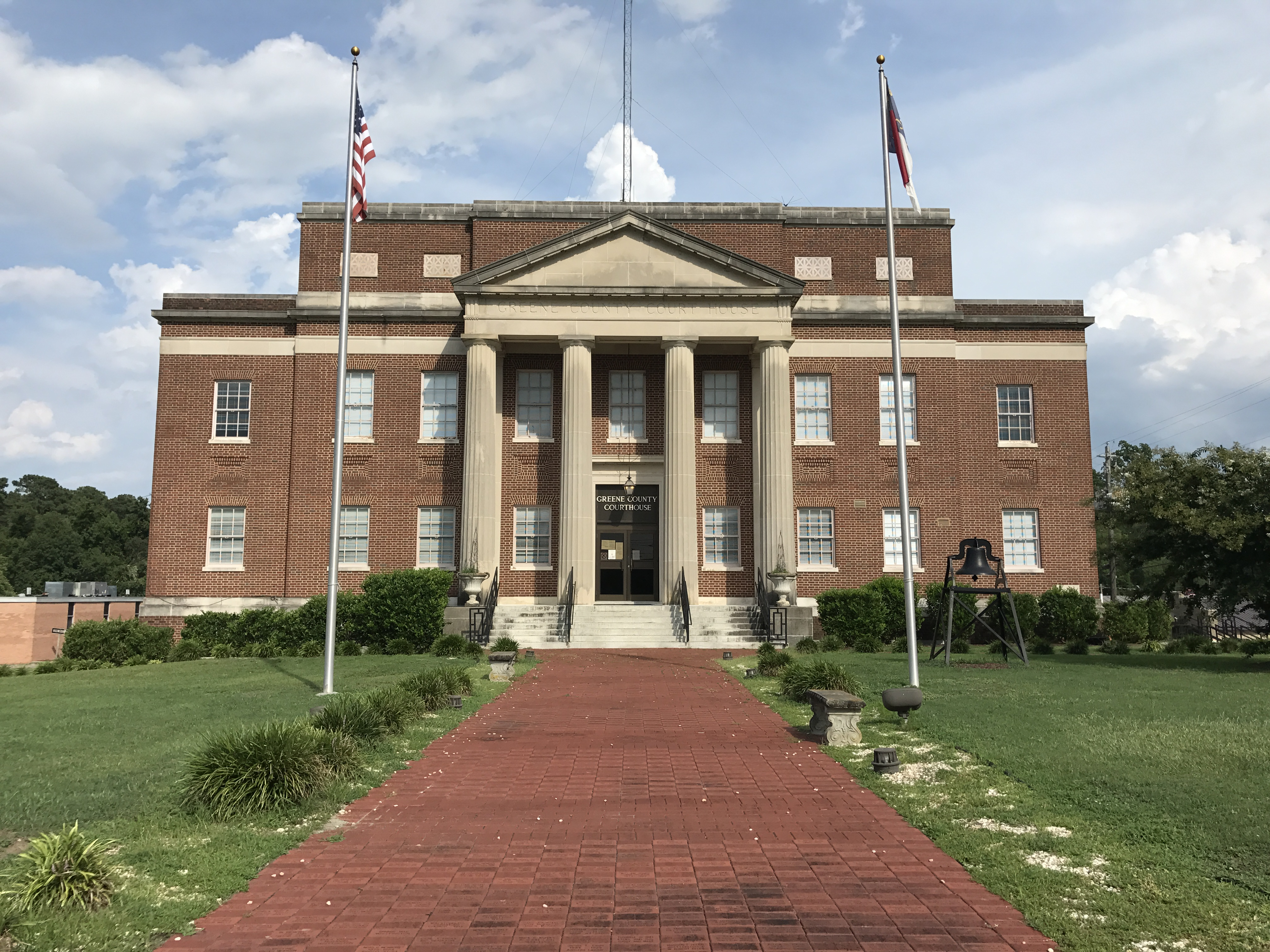
- Front of the courthouse

- Location within North Carolina Location within the United States
- Location: Greene and 2nd Sts., Snow Hill, North Carolina
- Coordinates: 35°27′20″N 77°40′13″W
- Area: less than one acre
- Built: 1935
- Built by: Loving, T.A.
- Architect: Herman, Thomas B.
- Architectural style: Classical Revival
- MPS: North Carolina County Courthouses TR
- NRHP reference No.: 79001712
- Added to NRHP: May 10, 1979

Greene County Courthouse is a historic courthouse building located at Snow Hill, Greene County, North Carolina. It was built in 1935, and is a two-story, conservative Classical Revival-style brick building. The front facade features a Doric order pedimented portico. The building was constructed under the Works Project Administration.

It was listed on the National Register of Historic Places in 1979. It is located in the Snow Hill Historic District.
