= Pitt–Greenville Airport =

- IATA: PGV; ICAO: KPGV; FAA LID: PGV

Summary
- Airport type: Public
- Owner: Pitt–Greenville Airport Authority
- Operator: Pitt County & Greenville
- Serves: Greenville, North Carolina
- Elevation AMSL: 27 ft (8.2 m)
- Coordinates: 35°38′07″N 77°23′07″W
- Website: flypgv.com

Maps
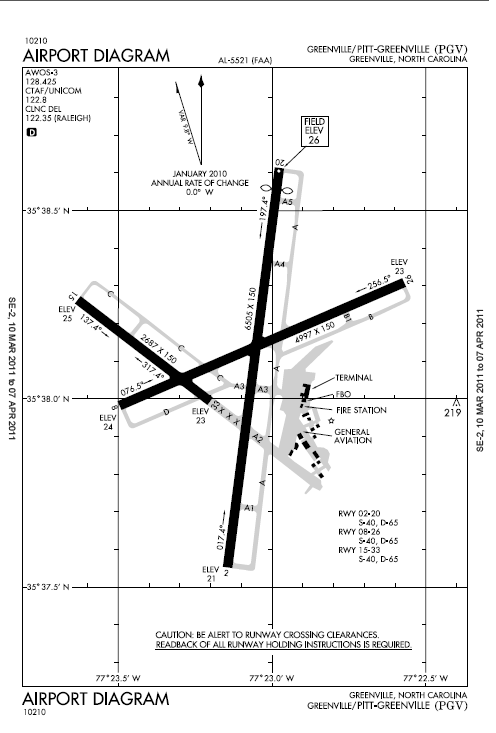
- Airport diagram showing the three runways (2011)

- Location within North Carolina Location within the United States

Runways
| Direction | Length | | Surface |
| Direction | ft | m | Surface |
|---|---|---|---|
| 2/20 | 7,175 | 2,187 | Asphalt |
| 8/26 | 4,997 | 1,523 | Asphalt |
- Source: Federal Aviation Administration

Pitt–Greenville Airport (IATA: PGV, ICAO: KPGV, FAA LID: PGV) is a public airport located two miles (3 km) north of the central business district of Greenville, North Carolina, and East Carolina University. The airport covers 872 acres (353 ha) and has two runways. It is mostly used for general aviation but is also served by American Airlines, which operates commuter service to Charlotte. The airport manager is Kim W. Hopper.

== History ==
The Works Progress Administration constructed the Greenville Airport in 1940 on land that was jointly owned by the city of Greenville and Pitt County. A Civil Pilot Training Program operated from the airport until it was leased by the United States Navy on May 1, 1942, to be an outlying field of Marine Corps Air Station Cherry Point. The field was underutilized until November 30, 1942, when it was announced that it would be upgraded by the Civil Aeronautics Administration.

The first Marine Corps flying squadrons to arrive were scout bombing squadrons VMSB-343 and VMSB-344 in January 1944. July saw the arrival of fighter squadrons VMF-913 and VMF-914 and October brought the photo reconnaissance squadrons VMD-354 and VMD-954. During the war, Outlying Field Greenville was the busiest of MCAS Cherry Point's outlying fields. PGV used to service Delta Air Lines to Atlanta

=== 2011 Expansion ===
The airport officially opened the renovated air terminal on February 24, 2011. The $7.9 million expansion was funded by the federal stimulus. It took two years of planning and 18 months of construction.

=== Runway expansion and safety improvements ===
The Airport Authority decided to extend Runway 2/20 by 670 feet. It will receive $2.5 million from the FAA to help buy out the affected houses. The groundbreaking occurred in August 2013, and was completed in 2014. The lengthening will allow the current critical aircraft to operate at full payload service capabilities, including during hot weather. For years, Pitt-Greenville had been hampered by its short runways. Teams playing games against East Carolina University had to fly into nearby Kinston because the runways were not long enough to handle modern charter jets.

This expansion will also bring this runway up to current runway safety area standards. Also included will be the clearing of tree obstacles and the installation of a new GPS RNAV vertically guided approach for Runway 2.

=== 2026 Midterm Rally ===
President Donald Trump held a rally for North Carolina Republicans including former RNC chair Michael Whatley who was running for senator and trailing behind former governor and Democrat senate candidate Roy Cooper in the polls on October 20th, 2026. Multiple hecklers were removed from the event.

== Airline and destination ==
=== Passenger ===
| Airlines | Destinations |
|---|---|
| American Eagle | Charlotte |

=== Top destinations ===
Busiest domestic routes from PGV (September 2025 - August 2026)
| Rank | City | Passengers |
|---|---|---|
| 1 | Charlotte, North Carolina | 35,470 |

== See also ==
- List of airports in North Carolina
