= Snow Hill, North Carolina =

- Town
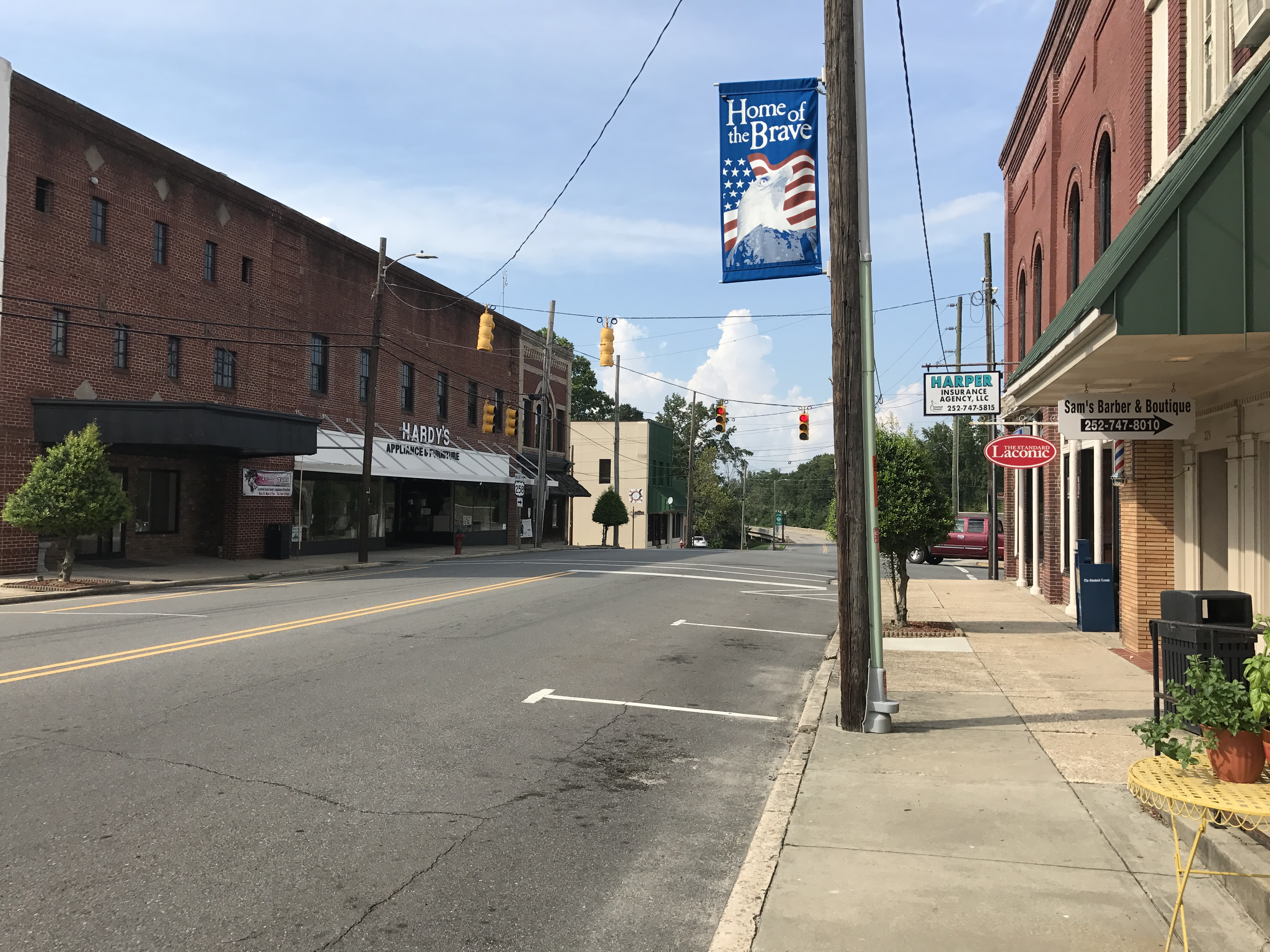

- Seal
- Motto: "A Nice Place to Live"
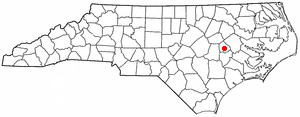
- Location of Snow Hill, North Carolina
- Coordinates: 35°27′02″N 77°40′36″W
- Country: United States
- State: North Carolina
- County: Greene
- Founded: 1811
- Incorporated: 1828
- Named for: Contentnea Creek

Government
  - Mayor: Dianne Andrews

Area
  - Total: 1.54 sq mi (3.99 km^{2})
  - Land: 1.54 sq mi (3.99 km^{2})
  - Water: 0 sq mi (0.00 km^{2})
- Elevation: 72 ft (22 m)

Population (2020)
  - Total: 1,481
  - Density: 962.5/sq mi (371.64/km^{2})
- Time zone: UTC-5 (Eastern (EST))
  - Summer (DST): UTC-4 (EDT)
- ZIP code: 28580
- Area code: 252
- FIPS code: 37-62760
- GNIS feature ID: 2407362
- Website: www.snowhillnc.com

Snow Hill is a town in Greene County, North Carolina, United States. The population was 1,481 at the 2020 census. It is the county seat of Greene County and is part of the Greenville Metropolitan Area. Snow Hill hosts numerous tennis tournaments during the year. Snow Hill is home to the Green Ridge Racquet Club. Many junior players and adults travel to Snow Hill in order to play in the USTA (United States Tennis Association) Sanctioned tournaments.

== History ==
In its early history, Snow Hill was near the location of the final major battle of the Tuscarora War at Fort Neoheroka in 1713. There are several theories for the derivation of the town's name. One theory is that the town derived its name from the Contentnea Creek on whose banks Native Americans camped and called them "snowy white," which was translated into "snowy hills." It snows rarely, however, so the snowy white is more likely a reference to the white sands along the creek. Another theory was described by McLoud in the Goldsboro newspaper as being "loblolly pine is in water," and the most recent translation from the Tuscarora language offered was "as fish go by."

Originally a community in central Greene County, the town of Snow Hill was chartered in 1828. The town almost became the capital of North Carolina and was originally a major trading depot on Contentnea Creek. At the time, Contentnea Creek was a main Wilson-to-New Bern trading artery. Contentnea Creek connects with the Neuse River at Kinston.

It is believed Snow Hill is the smallest town in the United States to ever field a professional baseball team. From 1937-40, the Snow Hill Billies played in the Class D Coastal Plain League and won the league pennant in 1937. Future New York Yankees Aaron Robinson and Al Gettel began their careers with the Billies, as did Walter Rabb, who would serve as head baseball coach at the University of North Carolina at Chapel Hill for nearly thirty years.

In April 2011, a tornado struck the town and caused massive damage.

The Greene County Courthouse, Neoheroka Fort Site, Snow Hill Colored High School, Snow Hill Historic District, and St. Barnabas Episcopal Church are listed on the National Register of Historic Places.

== Geography ==
Snow Hill is located south of the center of Greene County on a low bluff on the south side of Contentnea Creek. U.S. Route 13 passes through the north side of town, leading northeast 23 miles (37 km) to Greenville and southwest 21 miles (34 km) to Goldsboro. U.S. Route 258 passes through the center of town, leading north 11 miles (18 km) to Farmville and south 16 miles (26 km) to Kinston.

According to the United States Census Bureau, Snow Hill has a total area of 1.5 square miles (4.0 km^{2}), all land.

== Demographics ==
Historical population
Census	Pop.	Note	%±
1870	320		—
1880	332		3.8%
1890	283		−14.8%
1900	405		43.1%
1910	450		11.1%
1920	700		55.6%
1930	826		18.0%
1940	928		12.3%
1950	946		1.9%
1960	1,043		10.3%
1970	1,359		30.3%
1980	1,374		1.1%
1990	1,378		0.3%
2000	1,514		9.9%
2010	1,595		5.4%
2020	1,481		−7.1%
U.S. Decennial Census

=== 2020 census ===
Snow Hill racial composition
Race	Number	Percentage
White (non-Hispanic)	584	39.43%
Black or African American (non-Hispanic)	679	45.85%
Native American	4	0.27%
Asian	16	1.08%
Other/Mixed	45	3.04%
Hispanic or Latino	153	10.33%

As of the 2020 United States census, there were 1,481 people, 760 households, and 480 families residing in the town.

=== 2010 census ===
As of the 2010 United States census, there were 1,595 people living in the town. The racial makeup of the town was 52.6% Black, 36.3% White, 0.2% Native American, 1.1% Asian, 0.1% from some other race and 1.1% from two or more races. 8.7% were Hispanic or Latino of any race.

=== 2000 census ===
As of the census of 2000, there were 1,514 people, 627 households, and 381 families living in the town. The population density was 1,286.8 inhabitants per square mile (496.8/km^{2}). There were 683 housing units at an average density of 580.5 per square mile (224.1/km^{2}). The racial makeup of the town was 48.81% African American, 47.03% White, 0.40% Native American, 0.07% Asian, 2.97% from other races, and 0.73% from two or more races. Hispanic or Latino of any race were 3.30% of the population.

There were 627 households, out of which 23.9% had children under the age of 18 living with them, 38.0% were married couples living together, 18.7% had a female householder with no husband present, and 39.2% were non-families. 36.5% of all households were made up of individuals, and 17.4% had someone living alone, who was 65 years of age or older. The average household size was 2.20 and the average family size was 2.85.

In the town, the population was spread out, with 18.9% under the age of 18, 8.7% from 18 to 24, 23.3% from 25 to 44, 24.4% from 45 to 64, and 24.6% who were 65 years of age or older. The median age was 44 years. For every 100 females, there were 81.1 males. For every 100 females age 18 and over, there were 74.9 males.

The median income for a household in the town was $25,795, and the median income for a family was $29,213. Males had a median income of $25,625 versus $20,556 for females. The per capita income for the town was $15,904. About 15.3% of families and 20.5% of the population were below the poverty line, including 24.1% of those under age 18 and 26.5% of those age 65 or over.

== Education ==
Schools in Snow Hill are administered by the Greene County Schools system. The six schools include Greene Central High School, Greene Early College High School, Greene County Middle School, Greene County Intermediate School, Snow Hill Primary School and West Greene Elementary School. Higher education is provided through nearby East Carolina University or community colleges located in Goldsboro, Greenville and Kinston.

== Transportation ==
The closest airport to Snow Hill is Pitt-Greenville Airport (IATA: PGV, ICAO: KPGV, FAA LID: PGV) with service to Charlotte Douglas International Airport, although most residents use Raleigh-Durham International Airport for domestic and international travel.

Highways that run through the city include US 13, US 258, NC 903, NC 58 and NC 91. The closest Interstate Highway is I-795, located 21 miles (34 km) to the west in Fremont.

== Notable people ==
- Don Davis, current member of the United States House of Representatives representing North Carolina's 1st congressional district and former member of the North Carolina Senate and Mayor of Snow Hill
- Ray E. Eubanks, US Army paratrooper and Medal of Honor recipient in World War II
- Cliff Godwin, former American baseball player and current head coach at East Carolina University
- Petey Pablo, rapper
- Rapsody, rapper
- Mule Shirley, Major League Baseball first baseman
