= Greene County, North Carolina =

County in North Carolina, United States

- County
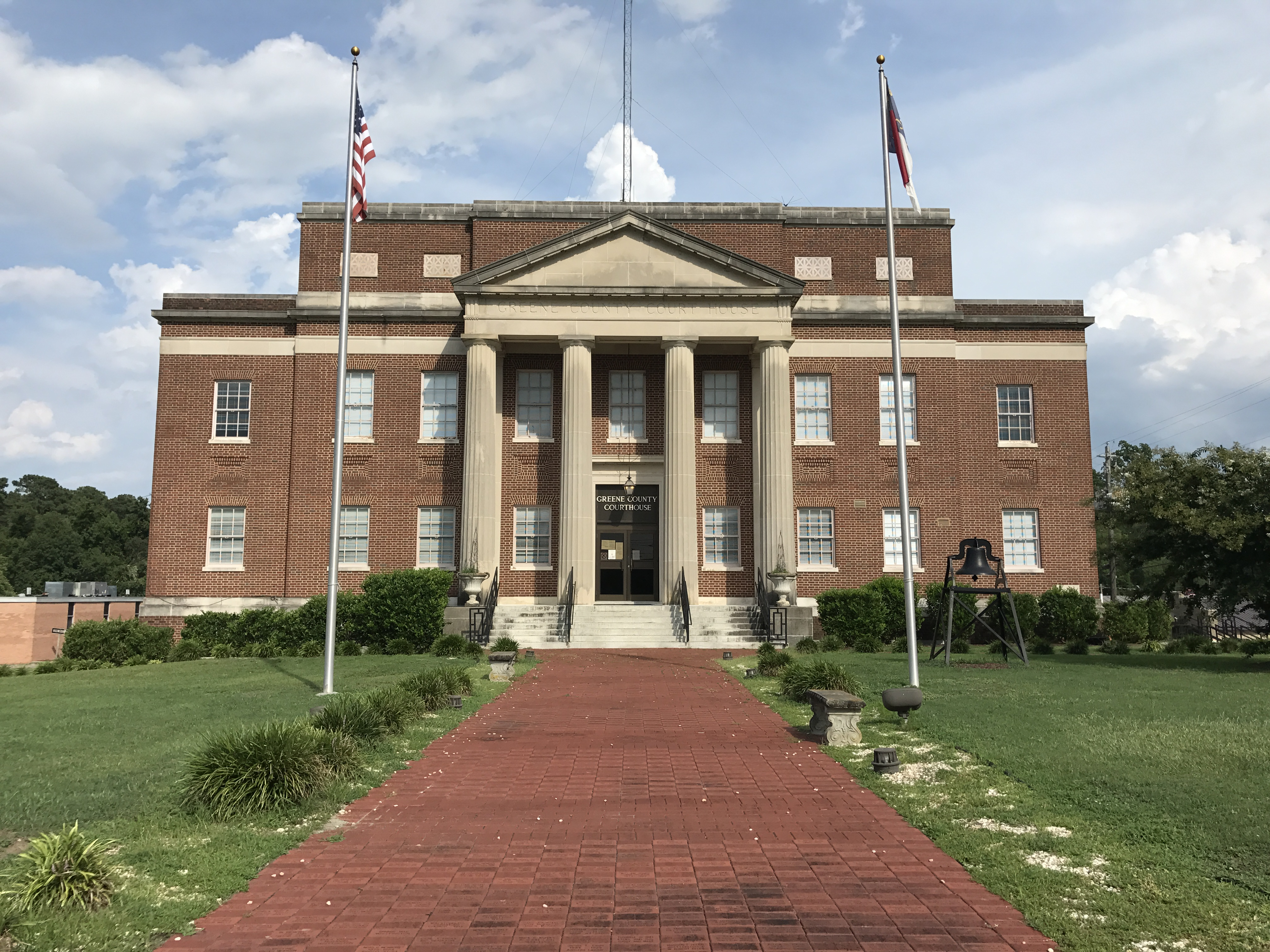
- Greene County Courthouse in Snow Hill

- Flag Seal Logo
- Motto: "A place to grow. The way to live."
- Location within the U.S. state of North Carolina
- Interactive map of Greene County, North Carolina
- Coordinates: 35.48°N 77.68°W
- Country: United States
- State: North Carolina
- Founded: 1799
- Named for: Nathanael Greene
- Seat: Snow Hill
- Largest community: Snow Hill

Area
  - Total: 267.21 sq mi (692.1 km^{2})
  - Land: 266.73 sq mi (690.8 km^{2})
  - Water: 0.48 sq mi (1.2 km^{2}) 0.18%

Population (2020)
  - Total: 20,451
  - Estimate (2025): 20,700 ▲
  - Density: 76.67/sq mi (29.60/km^{2})
- Time zone: UTC−5 (Eastern)
  - Summer (DST): UTC−4 (EDT)
- Congressional district: 1st
- Website: greenecountync.gov

Greene County is a county located in the U.S. state of North Carolina. As of the 2020 census, the population was 20,451. Its county seat is Snow Hill.

== History ==
Greene County, being a part of land grant by King Charles II of England in 1663, was first settled around 1710 by immigrants from Maryland, Virginia, and parts of North Carolina. The original inhabitants of the area, the Tuscarora Indians, fought with these immigrants and on March 20–23, 1713, a fighting force of South Carolinians and Yamasee Indians, under Colonel Murice Moore, defeated the Tuscarora, under the leadership of Chief Hancock. This was the final major battle of the Tuscarora War at Fort Neoheroka near current day Snow Hill.

In 1758, the area now recognized as Greene and Lenoir Counties was separated from Johnston and named Dobbs for the Royal Governor. The county was formed in 1791 from the northern part of Dobbs County. It was originally named Glasgow County, for James Glasgow, North Carolina Secretary of State from 1777 to 1798. In 1799, Glasgow's involvement in military land grant frauds forced him to resign and leave the state. Glasgow County was then renamed Greene County in honor of Nathanael Greene, one of General Washington's right-hand men.

The county seat, Snow Hill, is the largest town and major commercial center in the county. The town draws its name from the historic white sandy banks of nearby Contentnea Creek.

=== Former Greene County ===
Present-day Greene County is the second county of that name in North Carolina. The first (also named for Nathanael Greene) is now Greene County, Tennessee. It was established in 1783, in what was then the western part of the state. That area was ceded to the federal government and became part of the Southwest Territory (1790–1796) and the State of Tennessee (after 1796).

== Geography ==
According to the U.S. Census Bureau, the county has a total area of 267.21 square miles (692.1 km^{2}), of which 266.73 square miles (690.8 km^{2}) is land and 0.48 square miles (1.2 km^{2}) (0.2%) is water.

=== State and local protected areas ===
- Contentnea Creek Hunting Preserve
- Oak Hill Preserve

=== Major water bodies ===
- Contentnea Creek
- Middle Swamp
- Nahunta Swamp
- Reedy Branch
- Sandy Run
- Turnage Millpond
- Wheat Swamp

=== Adjacent counties ===
- Pitt County – east-northeast
- Wilson County – northwest
- Lenoir County – south
- Wayne County – west

=== Major highways ===
- I-587
- US 13
- US 258
- US 264
- US 264 Alt.
- NC 58
- NC 91
- NC 121
- NC 123
- NC 903

== Demographics ==
Historical population
Census	Pop.	Note	%±
1800	4,218		—
1810	4,867		15.4%
1820	4,533		−6.9%
1830	6,413		41.5%
1840	6,595		2.8%
1850	6,619		0.4%
1860	7,925		19.7%
1870	8,687		9.6%
1880	10,037		15.5%
1890	10,039		0.0%
1900	12,038		19.9%
1910	13,083		8.7%
1920	16,212		23.9%
1930	18,656		15.1%
1940	18,548		−0.6%
1950	18,024		−2.8%
1960	16,741		−7.1%
1970	14,967		−10.6%
1980	16,117		7.7%
1990	15,384		−4.5%
2000	18,974		23.3%
2010	21,362		12.6%
2020	20,451		−4.3%
2025 (est.)	20,700	▲	1.2%
U.S. Decennial Census; 1790–1960 1900–1990; 1990–2000 2010 2020

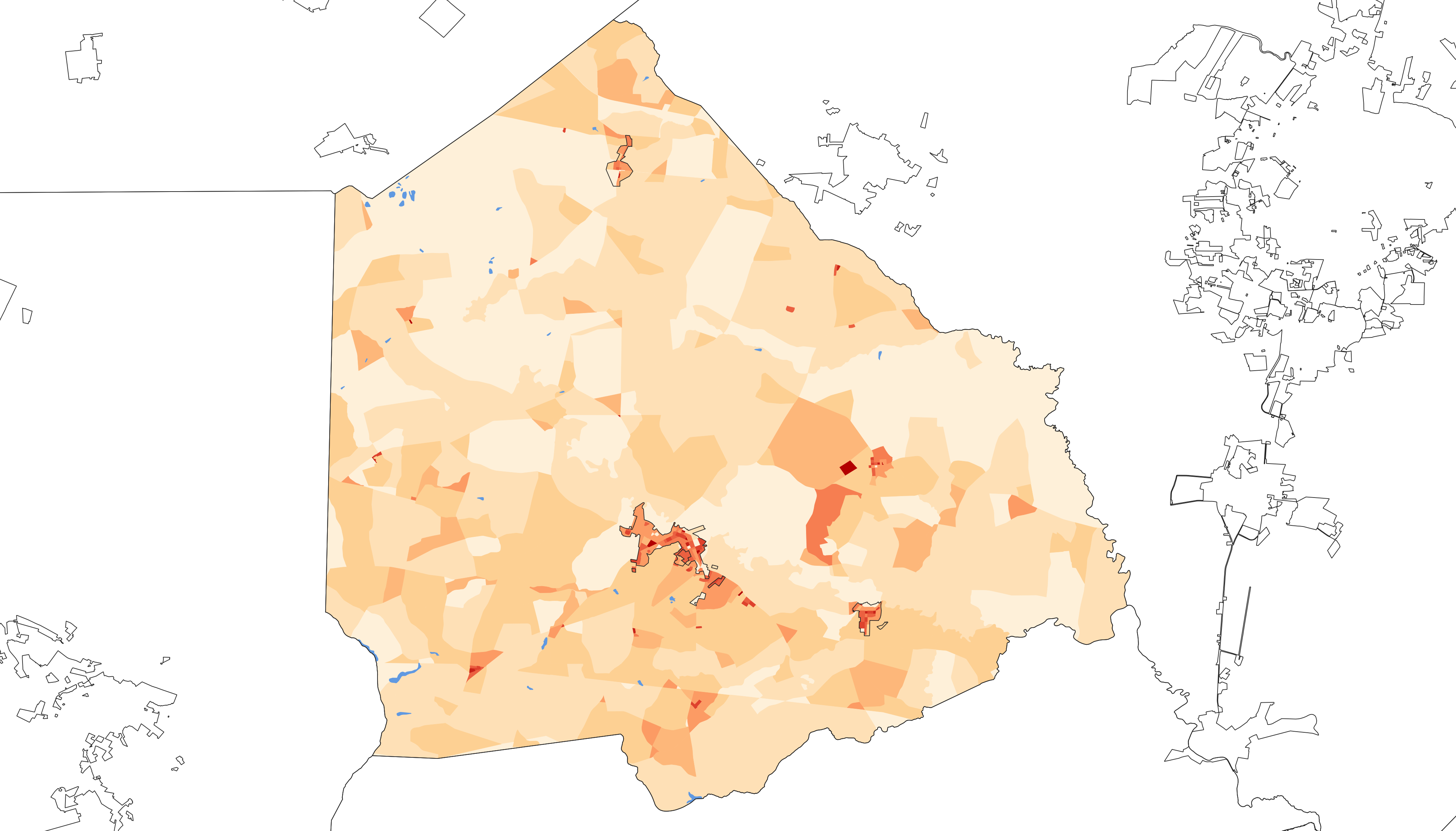
2020 population density of Greene County NC by census block

=== Racial and ethnic composition ===
Greene County, North Carolina – Racial and ethnic composition Note: the US Census treats Hispanic/Latino as an ethnic category. This table excludes Latinos from the racial categories and assigns them to a separate category. Hispanics/Latinos may be of any race.
Race / Ethnicity (NH = Non-Hispanic)	Pop 1980	Pop 1990	Pop 2000	Pop 2010	Pop 2020	% 1980	% 1990	% 2000	% 2010	% 2020
White alone (NH)	8,750	8,690	9,508	10,038	9,644	54.29%	56.49%	50.11%	46.99%	47.16%
Black or African American alone (NH)	7,218	6,505	7,792	7,902	7,206	44.79%	42.28%	41.07%	36.99%	35.24%
Native American or Alaska Native alone (NH)	2	16	40	98	95	0.01%	0.10%	0.21%	0.46%	0.46%
Asian alone (NH)	9	3	17	67	37	0.06%	0.02%	0.09%	0.31%	0.18%
Native Hawaiian or Pacific Islander alone (NH)	x	x	1	2	0	x	x	0.01%	0.01%	0.00%
Other race alone (NH)	1	1	7	11	78	0.01%	0.01%	0.04%	0.05%	0.38%
Mixed race or Multiracial (NH)	x	x	98	190	455	x	x	0.52%	0.89%	2.22%
Hispanic or Latino (any race)	137	169	1,511	3,054	2,936	0.85%	1.10%	7.96%	14.30%	14.36%
Total	16,117	15,384	18,974	21,362	20,451	100.00%	100.00%	100.00%	100.00%	100.00%

=== 2020 census ===
As of the 2020 census, there were 20,451 people, 6,984 households, and 4,750 families residing in the county. The median age was 41.5 years; 19.0% of residents were under the age of 18 and 17.7% were 65 years of age or older. For every 100 females there were 133.5 males, and for every 100 females age 18 and over there were 139.9 males age 18 and over.

The racial makeup of the county was 48.9% White, 35.5% Black or African American, 0.9% American Indian and Alaska Native, 0.2% Asian, 0.1% Native Hawaiian and Pacific Islander, 10.2% from some other race, and 4.3% from two or more races. Hispanic or Latino residents of any race comprised 14.4% of the population.

Fewer than 0.1% of residents lived in urban areas, while 100.0% lived in rural areas.

Of the 6,984 households, 30.3% had children under the age of 18 living in them. Of all households, 44.0% were married-couple households, 19.7% were households with a male householder and no spouse or partner present, and 31.0% were households with a female householder and no spouse or partner present. About 29.3% of all households were made up of individuals and 13.9% had someone living alone who was 65 years of age or older.

There were 7,846 housing units, of which 11.0% were vacant. Among occupied housing units, 69.7% were owner-occupied and 30.3% were renter-occupied. The homeowner vacancy rate was 0.8% and the rental vacancy rate was 5.9%.

=== 2000 census ===
At the 2000 census, there were 18,975 people, 6,696 households, and 4,955 families residing in the county. The population density was 72 people per square mile (28 people/km^{2}). There were 7,368 housing units at an average density of 28 units per square mile (11 units/km^{2}). The racial makeup of the county was 51.83% White, 41.21% Black or African American, 0.30% Native American, 0.09% Asian, 0.01% Pacific Islander, 5.75% from other races, and 0.80% from two or more races. 7.96% of the population were Hispanic or Latino of any race.

There were 6,696 households, out of which 34.30% had children under the age of 18 living with them, 52.10% were married couples living together, 17.30% had a female householder with no husband present, and 26.00% were non-families. 22.60% of all households were made up of individuals, and 10.00% had someone living alone who was 65 years of age or older. The average household size was 2.65 and the average family size was 3.09.

In the county, the population was spread out, with 25.30% under the age of 18, 9.40% from 18 to 24, 30.90% from 25 to 44, 22.30% from 45 to 64, and 12.10% who were 65 years of age or older. The median age was 36 years. For every 100 females there were 105.70 males. For every 100 females age 18 and over, there were 103.90 males.

The median income for a household in the county was $32,074, and the median income for a family was $36,419. Males had a median income of $27,048 versus $21,351 for females. The per capita income for the county was $15,452. About 16.00% of families and 20.20% of the population were below the poverty line, including 28.30% of those under age 18 and 20.50% of those age 65 or over.

== Government and politics ==
Prior to the 1965 Voting Rights Act, Greene County was an overwhelmingly Democratic “Solid South” bastion. Between 1932 and 1956, every Democratic nominee reached 93.5 percent of the county's vote, and up to 1960 Herbert Hoover in the religiously polarized 1928 election had been the only post-disfranchisement Republican to pass 22 percent of the county's vote. Unlike the Black Belts of the Deep South, Greene County completely resisted the Dixiecrat movement of 1948 to be only 0.07 percent shy of Texas’ Duval County as Harry Truman’s strongest in the country, and in 1952 it was indeed Adlai Stevenson II’s strongest county in his landslide loss to Dwight D. Eisenhower, besides being his strongest behind Georgia's Baker County in 1956. However, opposition to the voting and civil rights legislation of the Lyndon Johnson administration turned the county over to George Wallace in the 1968 presidential election, and Richard Nixon became the first Republican winner since Benjamin Harrison in 1888 with 75 percent of the vote in 1972. Since then, Greene County has gradually become Republican-leaning: the last Democratic presidential candidate to carry the county was Bill Clinton in 1992, although no Democrat except McGovern and Humphrey has fallen under 40 percent.

United States presidential election results for Greene County, North Carolina
Year	Republican		Democratic		Third party(ies)	
Year	No.	%	No.	%	No.	%
1912	124	10.60%	894	76.41%	152	12.99%
1916	294	21.62%	1,066	78.38%	0	0.00%
1920	439	21.02%	1,649	78.98%	0	0.00%
1924	182	13.91%	1,119	85.55%	7	0.54%
1928	542	31.46%	1,181	68.54%	0	0.00%
1932	94	3.61%	2,510	96.28%	3	0.12%
1936	116	3.61%	3,097	96.39%	0	0.00%
1940	104	3.36%	2,990	96.64%	0	0.00%
1944	113	4.28%	2,528	95.72%	0	0.00%
1948	65	2.33%	2,687	96.45%	34	1.22%
1952	186	5.88%	2,976	94.12%	0	0.00%
1956	222	6.33%	3,285	93.67%	0	0.00%
1960	451	12.73%	3,092	87.27%	0	0.00%
1964	901	24.94%	2,712	75.06%	0	0.00%
1968	650	12.71%	1,560	30.49%	2,906	56.80%
1972	2,788	75.68%	847	22.99%	49	1.33%
1976	1,356	32.88%	2,740	66.44%	28	0.68%
1980	2,221	43.44%	2,835	55.45%	57	1.11%
1984	3,195	53.47%	2,772	46.39%	8	0.13%
1988	2,498	47.69%	2,729	52.10%	11	0.21%
1992	2,180	38.03%	2,768	48.29%	784	13.68%
1996	2,689	51.73%	2,224	42.79%	285	5.48%
2000	3,353	57.12%	2,478	42.21%	39	0.66%
2004	3,800	58.71%	2,665	41.18%	7	0.11%
2008	4,272	52.72%	3,796	46.85%	35	0.43%
2012	4,411	53.56%	3,778	45.87%	47	0.57%
2016	4,374	54.03%	3,605	44.53%	116	1.43%
2020	4,874	55.68%	3,832	43.78%	47	0.54%
2024	4,965	58.76%	3,437	40.67%	48	0.57%

Greene County is represented by Republican Senator Buck Newton in North Carolina's 4th Senate district.

Greene County is a member of the regional Eastern Carolina Council of Governments.

== Economy ==
Greene County is classified by the state of North Carolina as economically distressed. The average income of a resident is approximately $36,700 per year.

== Education ==
Schools is Greene County are administered by the Greene County Schools system. The five schools include Greene Central High School, Greene Early College High School, Greene County Middle School, Greene County Intermediate, Snow Hill Primary School and West Greene Elementary School. Higher education is provided through nearby East Carolina University or community colleges located in Goldsboro, Greenville and Kinston. One private school, Mt. Calvary Christian Academy, is also located in the county.

== Communities ==
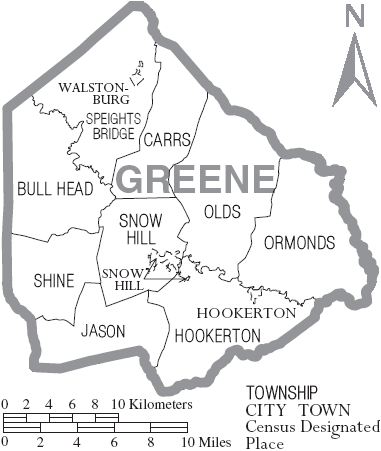
Map of Greene County with municipal and township labels

=== Towns ===
- Hookerton
- Snow Hill (county seat and largest community)
- Walstonburg

=== Townships ===
- Bull Head
- Carrs
- Hookerton
- Jason
- Olds
- Ormondsville
- Shine
- Snow Hill
- Speights Bridge

=== Census-designated place ===
- Maury

=== Unincorporated community ===
- Jason

== See also ==
- List of counties in North Carolina
- National Register of Historic Places listings in Greene County, North Carolina
- List of Highway Historical Markers in Greene County, North Carolina
- Pitt–Greenville Airport, closest airport to the county
