= Portsmouth, North Carolina =

- Portsmouth Village
- U.S. National Register of Historic Places
- U.S. Historic district
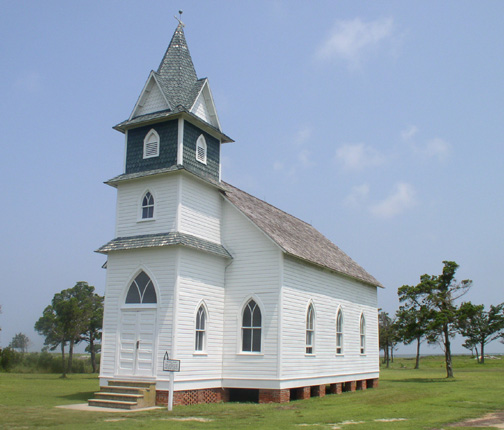
- Portsmouth Church

- Location within North Carolina Location within the United States
- Location: North end of Portsmouth Island, Portsmouth, North Carolina
- Coordinates: 35°4′11″N 76°3′49.64″W
- Area: 250 acres (100 ha)
- Architectural style: Bungalow/craftsman, Stick/eastlake
- NRHP reference No.: 78000267
- Added to NRHP: November 29, 1978

Portsmouth was a fishing and shipping village located on Portsmouth Island on the Core Banks in North Carolina, United States. Portsmouth Island is a tidal island connected, under most conditions, to the northern end of the North Core Banks, across Ocracoke Inlet from the village of Ocracoke. The town lies in Carteret County, was established in 1753 by the North Carolina Colonial Assembly, and abandoned in 1971. Its remains are now part of the Cape Lookout National Seashore.

== History ==
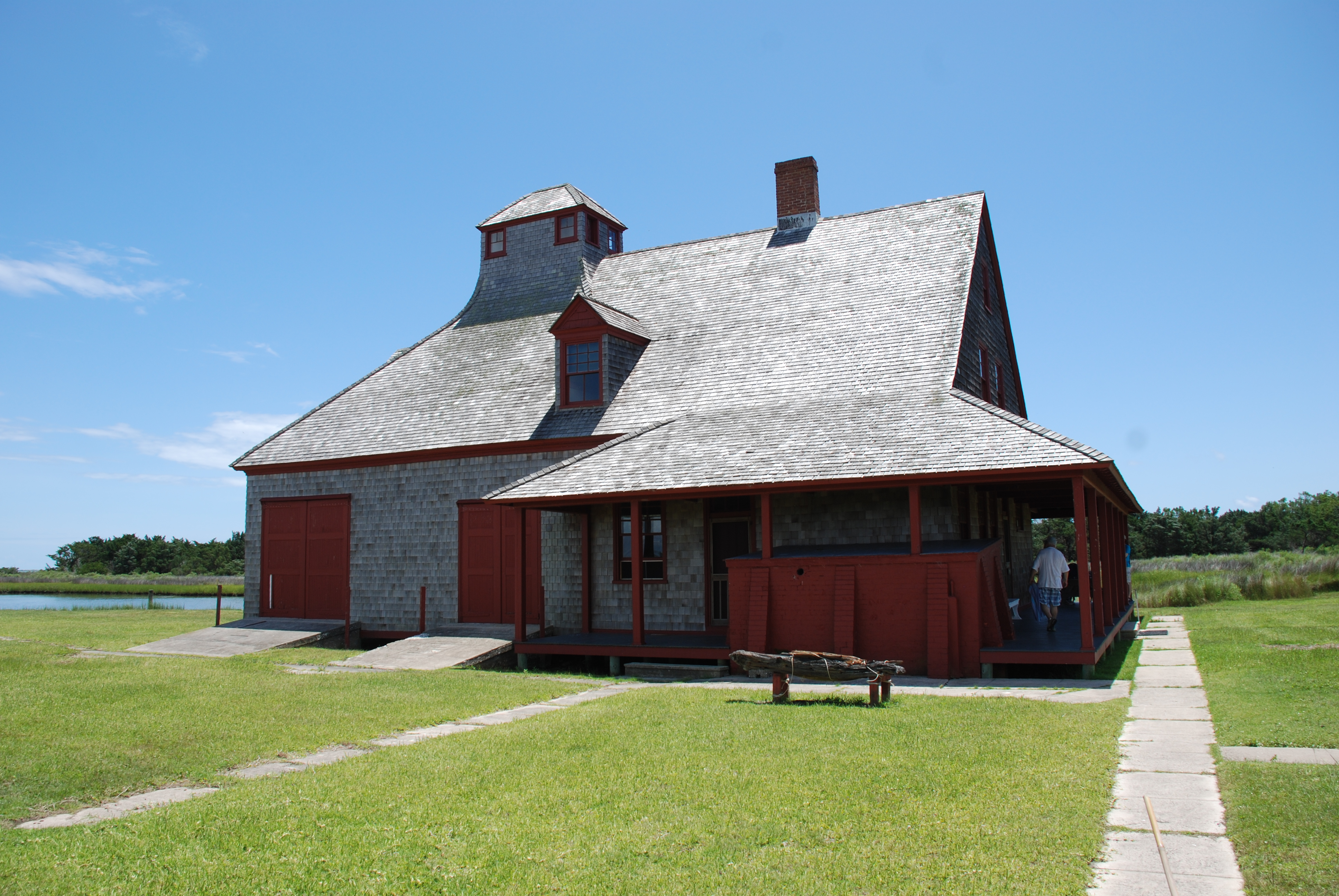
U.S. Life-Saving station (built 1894, decommissioned in 1937)

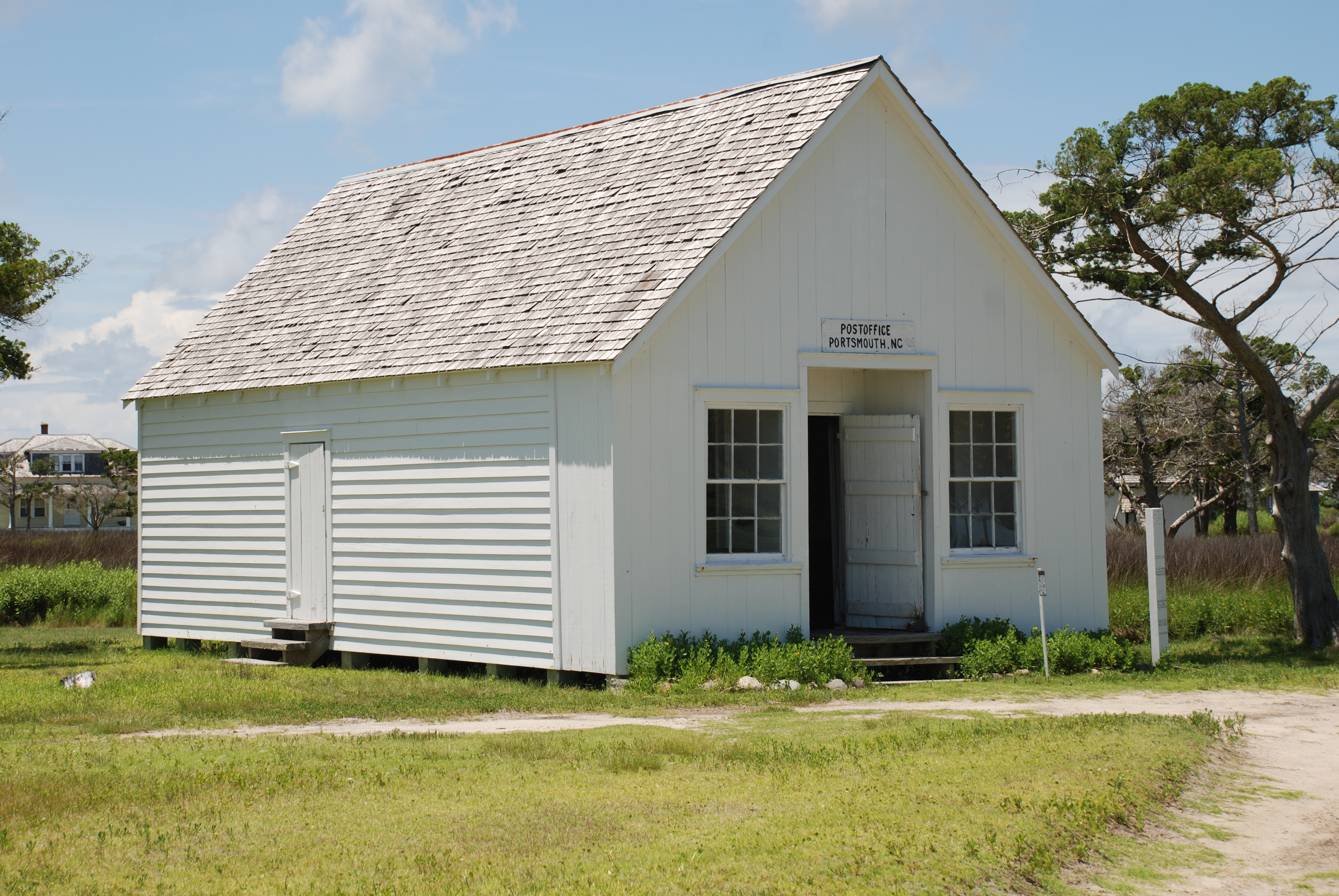
Post Office and General Store (built circa 1900, closed in 1959)

Ocracoke Inlet was a popular shipping lane during colonial times. Established in 1753, the town of Portsmouth functioned as a lightering port, where cargo from ocean-going vessels could be transferred to shallow-draft vessels capable of traversing Pamlico and Core Sounds. Portsmouth grew to a peak population of 685 in 1860. Though small, Portsmouth was one of the most important points-of-entry along the Atlantic coast in post-Revolutionary America.

In 1846, two strong hurricanes cut Oregon Inlet and deepened the existing Hatteras Inlet to the northeast, making Ocracoke Inlet a less desirable shipping lane by comparison. The waters around Portsmouth's harbor also began to shoal up, hastening its decline as a port. The Civil War was yet another blow as many people fled to the mainland when Union soldiers came to occupy the Outer Banks. Many didn't return after the war had ended and the Village of Portsmouth continued its decline, sped along by the occasional hurricane. The mammoth 1933 Atlantic hurricane season also served as a benchmark in the island's population decline, though more as a focal point of memory and a symbol of decline than the real cause of it. (These were the same hurricanes that led to the depopulation of the barrier islands on the Eastern Shore of Virginia and Maryland.)

A further blow was the decommissioning of the US Life-Saving Station there in 1937, and closing of the post office in 1959. In 1967 Portsmouth Island and village had already been acquired by the National Park Service, then incorporated into the new Cape Lookout National Seashore. The last two elderly residents, Marian Gray Babb and Nora Dixon, left the island in 1971 after the death of Henry Pigott, who although approximately the same age was essentially their caretaker.

In 1978 Portsmouth Village was added to the National Register of Historic Places.

Historical population
Census	Pop.	Note	%±
1790	226		—
1800	263		16.4%
1810	382		45.2%
1820	361		−5.5%
1830	393		8.9%
1840	462		17.6%
1850	510		10.4%
1860	685		34.3%
1870	323		−52.8%
1880	220		−31.9%
1890	204		−7.3%
1900	150		−26.5%
1910	182		21.3%
1920	143		−21.4%
1930	104		−27.3%
1940	42		−59.6%
1950	33		−21.4%
1960	8		−75.8%
1970	3		−62.5%
1980	0		−100.0%
1790-1840: 1840-1980:

== Life in Portsmouth ==
The inhabitants of Portsmouth Village were heavily engaged in fishing and other maritime trades, like piloting and manning vessels, even building a small man-made island, Shell Castle, out of oyster shells for use as a shipping depot. Later, many worked as fisherman and clammers. Much of Portsmouth's population was African American, descending from the slaves brought to the island. After the Civil War, most African Americans left Portsmouth, but some families remained, including the Pigott family, whose descendants were some of the island's last inhabitants: Henry and Lizzie Pigott. Under segregation, black and white children could not legally attend the one-room schoolhouse on Portsmouth Island together. The state never built a separate school for Blacks, so African Americans who remained on the island in its declining years never received the benefits of a formal education.

Inhabitants of the island lived without electricity, running water or refrigeration.

== Portsmouth today ==
Now, 21 total buildings stand, including about a dozen dwellings and a few out-buildings. These are maintained as part of the Portsmouth Village Historic District. Of these the Salter House/visitor center, the one-room school, the Methodist Church, the Life-Saving Station, Henry Pigott's house and the Post Office/general store are open to the public during the summer. Now, especially during the summers, people often visit the island and camp out overnight on the beach (camping is not allowed in the village). Facilities are very limited with a compost toilet near the Life-Saving Station and a restroom in the Salter house/visitors center, with no potable water, food, or electricity available.

Historical buildings in the village

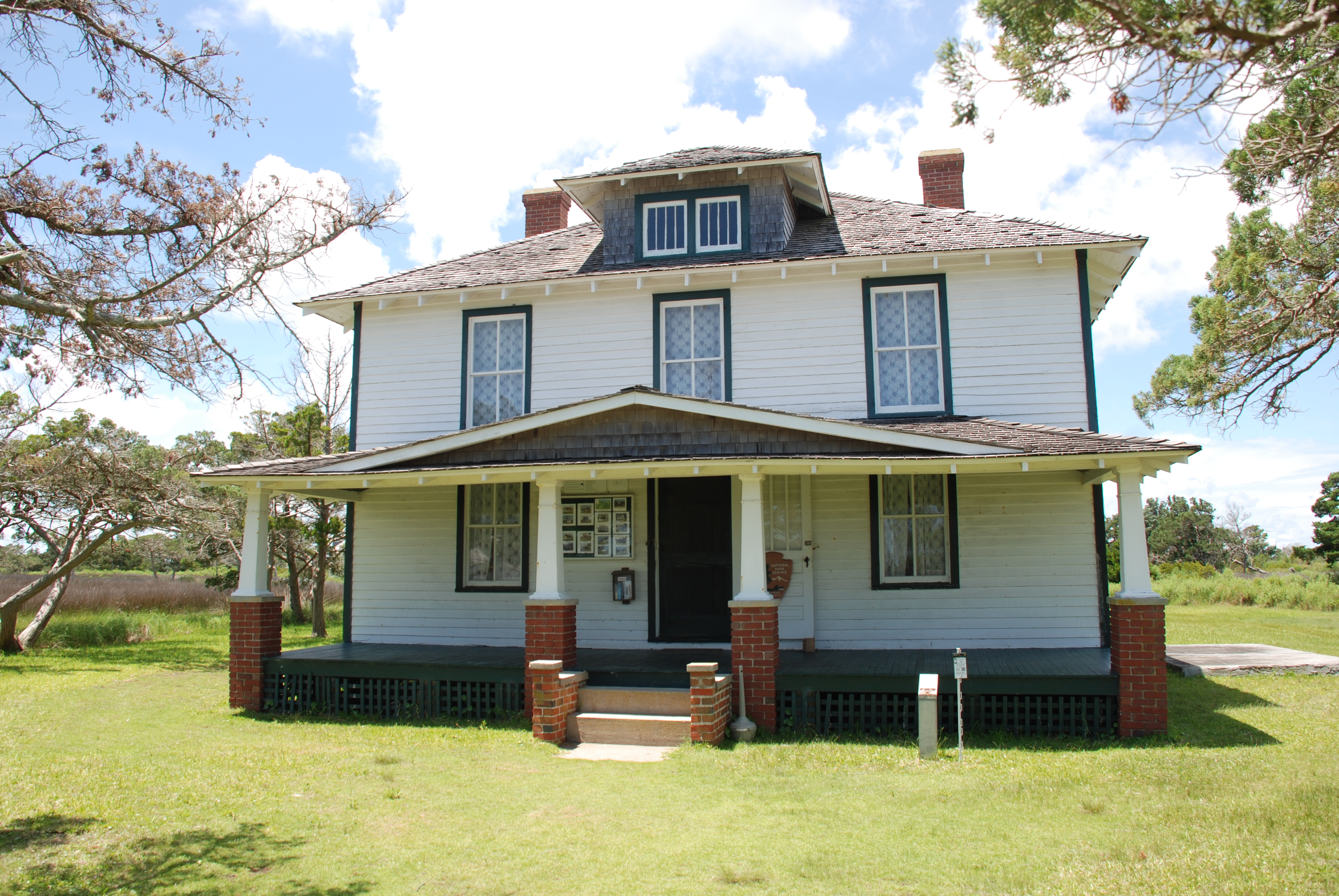
Theodore & Anne Salter House / Visitor Center (built circa 1905)

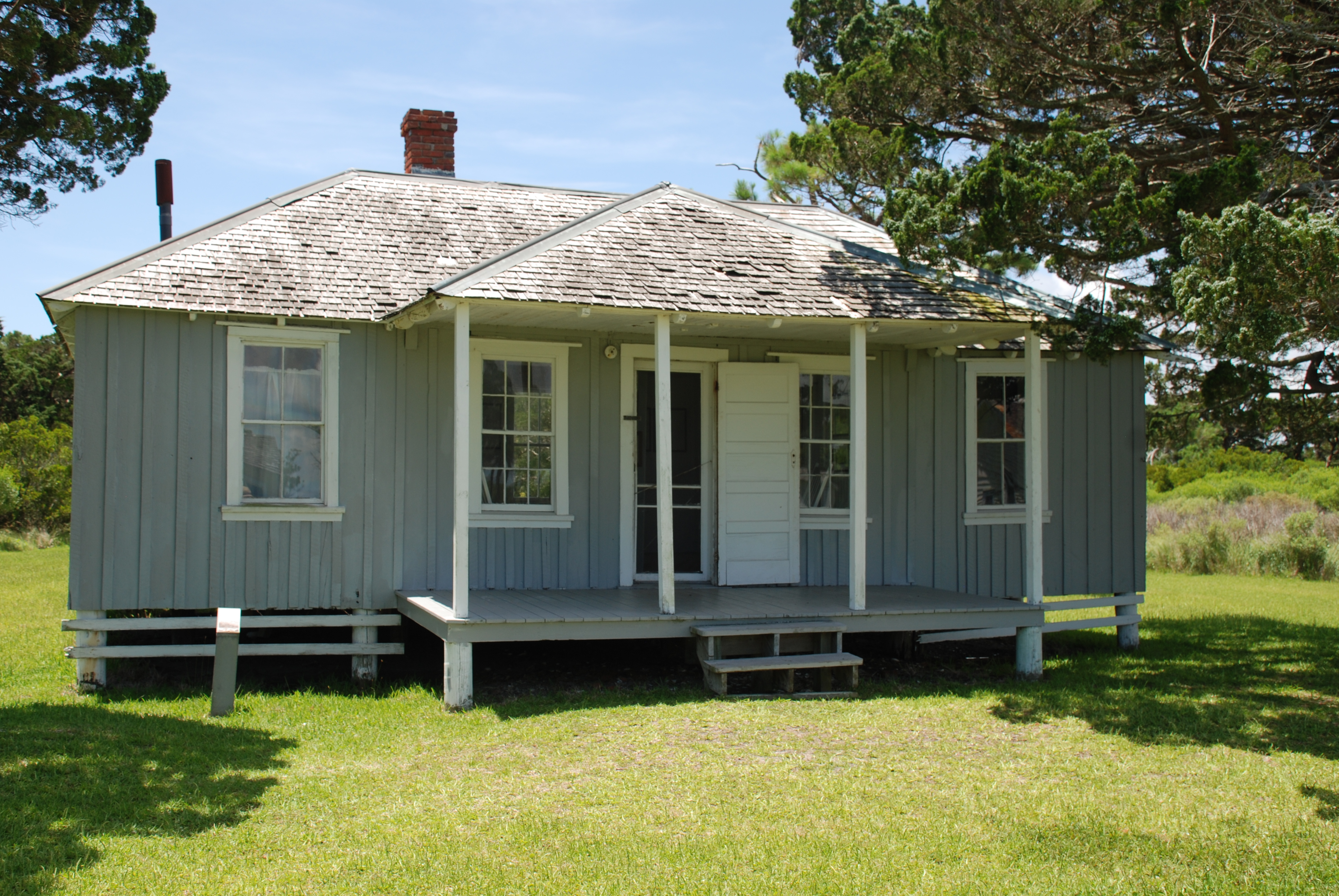
Lionel & Emma Gilgo House (built circa 1926)

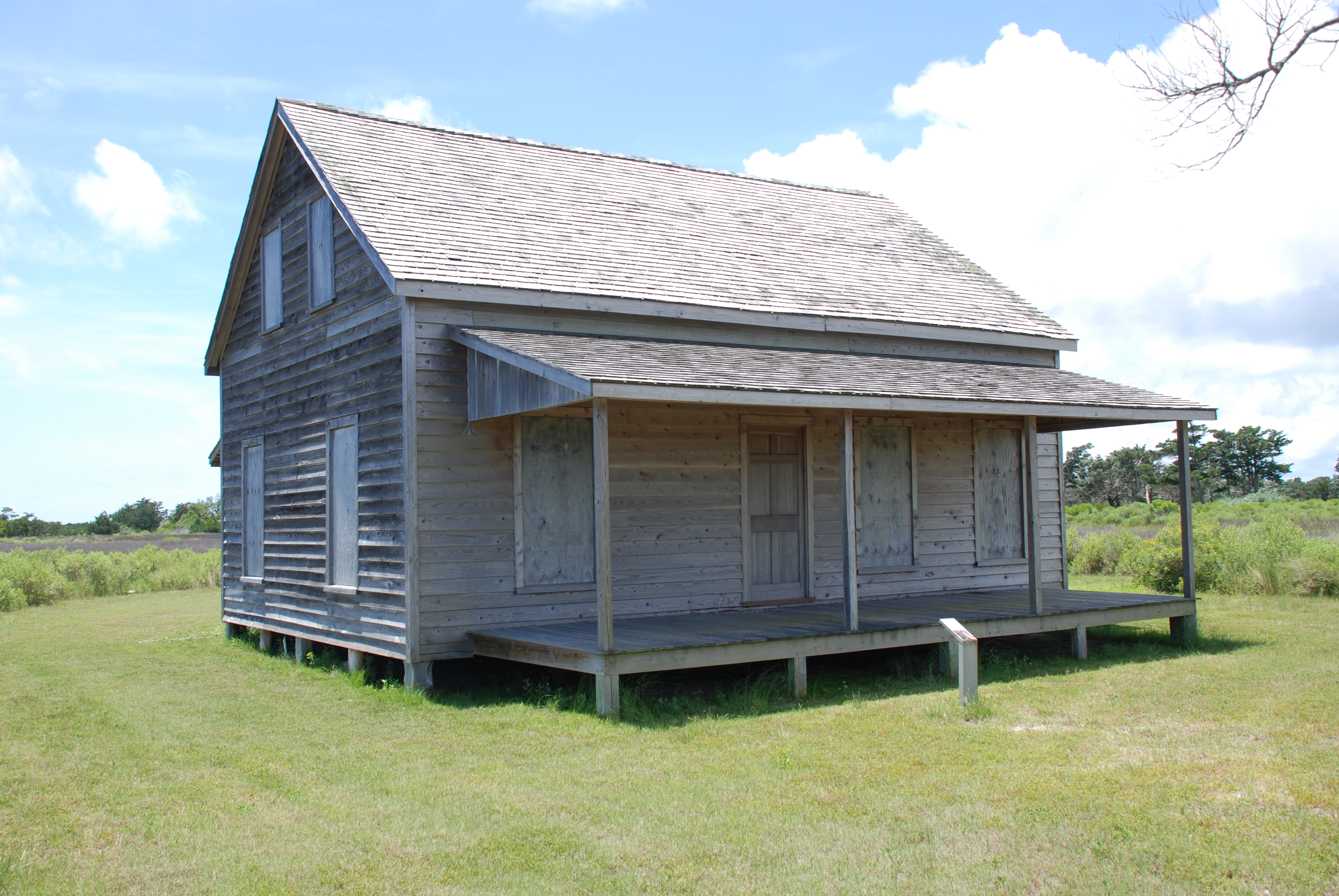
George & Patsy Dixon House (built circa 1875)

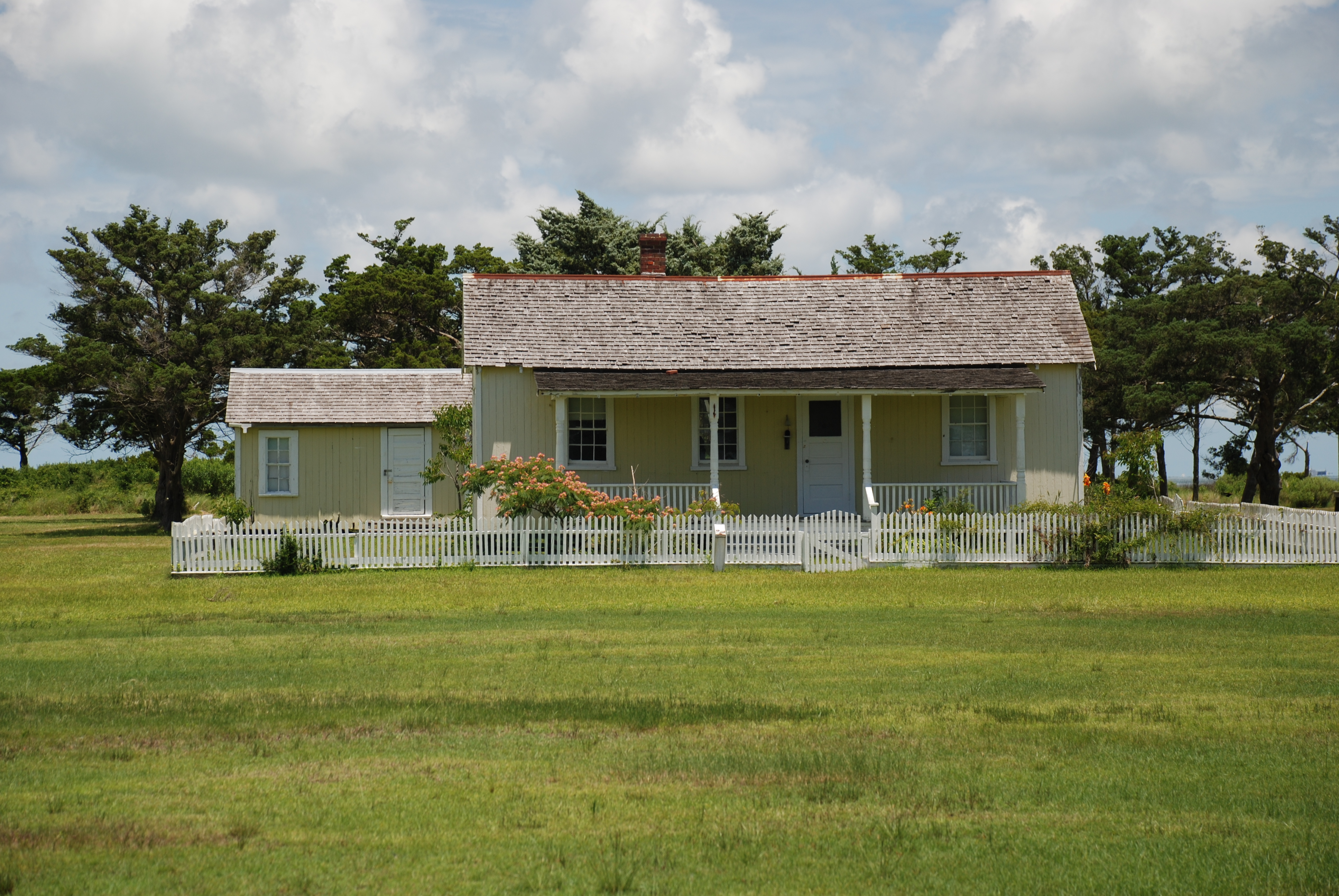
Ed, Nora, & Elma Dixon House (built circa 1910)

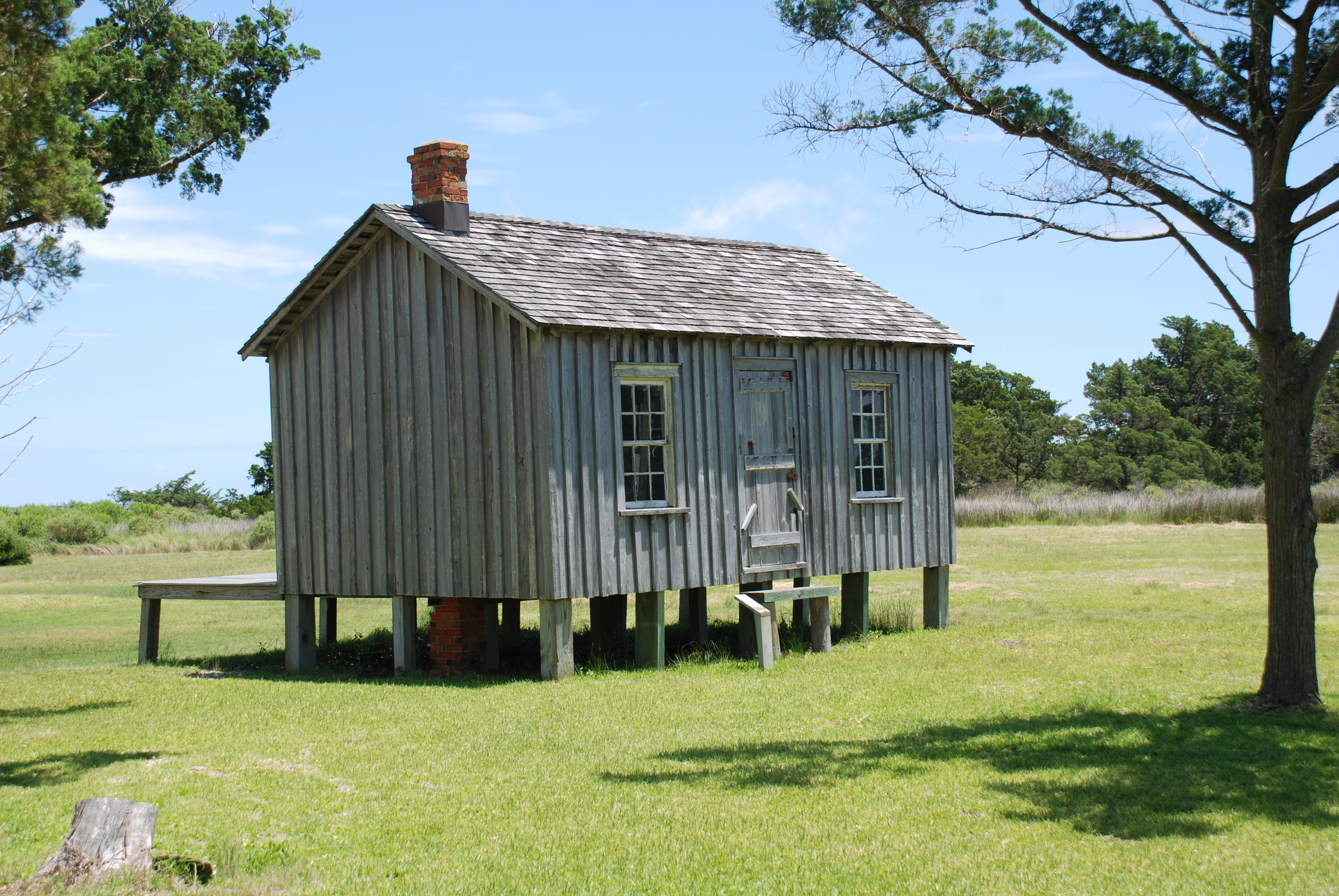
Ed & Kate Styron House (built 1933)

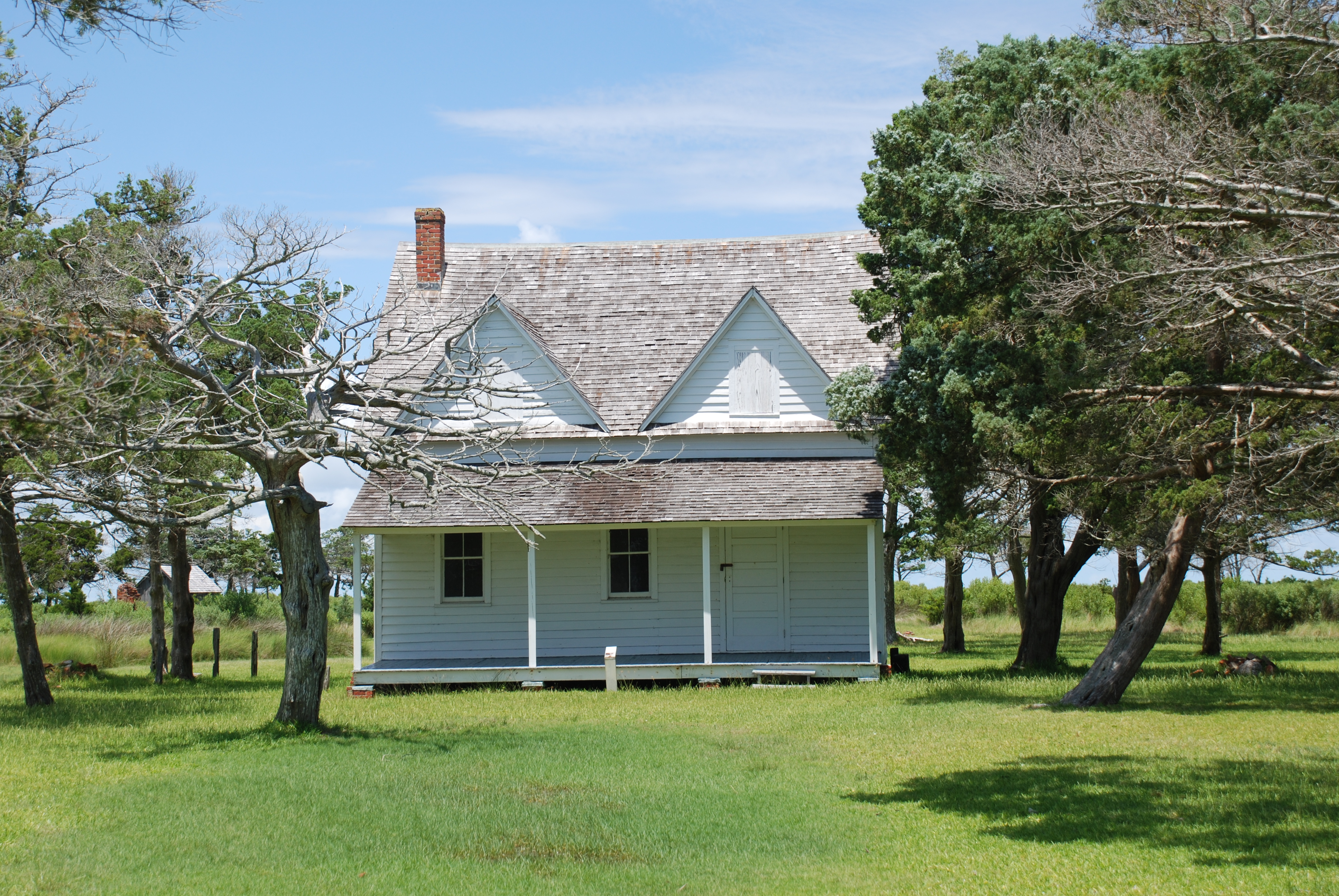
Walker & Sarah Styron House (built circa 1850)

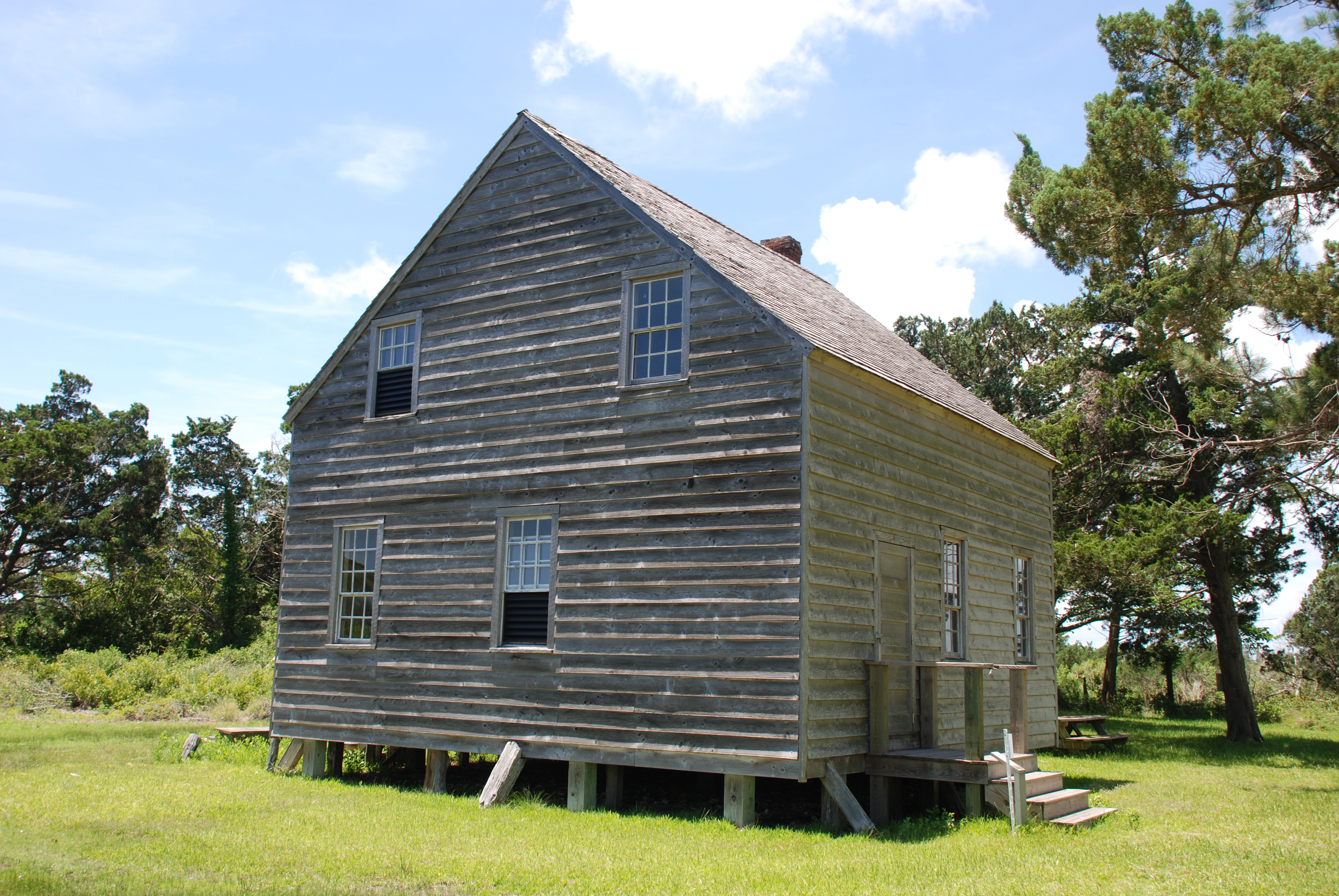
Washington Roberts House (built circa 1840)

== Homecoming ==
Portsmouth is the location of an increasingly well-known "homecoming," currently celebrated every two years. The island homecoming has its origins in the early trips made back to the island by families who left prior to the 1960s and was originally affiliated with the Methodist and Primitive Baptist churches, primarily out of Cedar Island, North Carolina, where many inhabitants of Portsmouth had resettled. The homecoming began as a church- and family-based event but has become increasingly a secular celebration of Portsmouth's heritage, under the aegis of the National Park Service. Many people who have no direct family connection to the island participate in the homecoming.

== Access ==
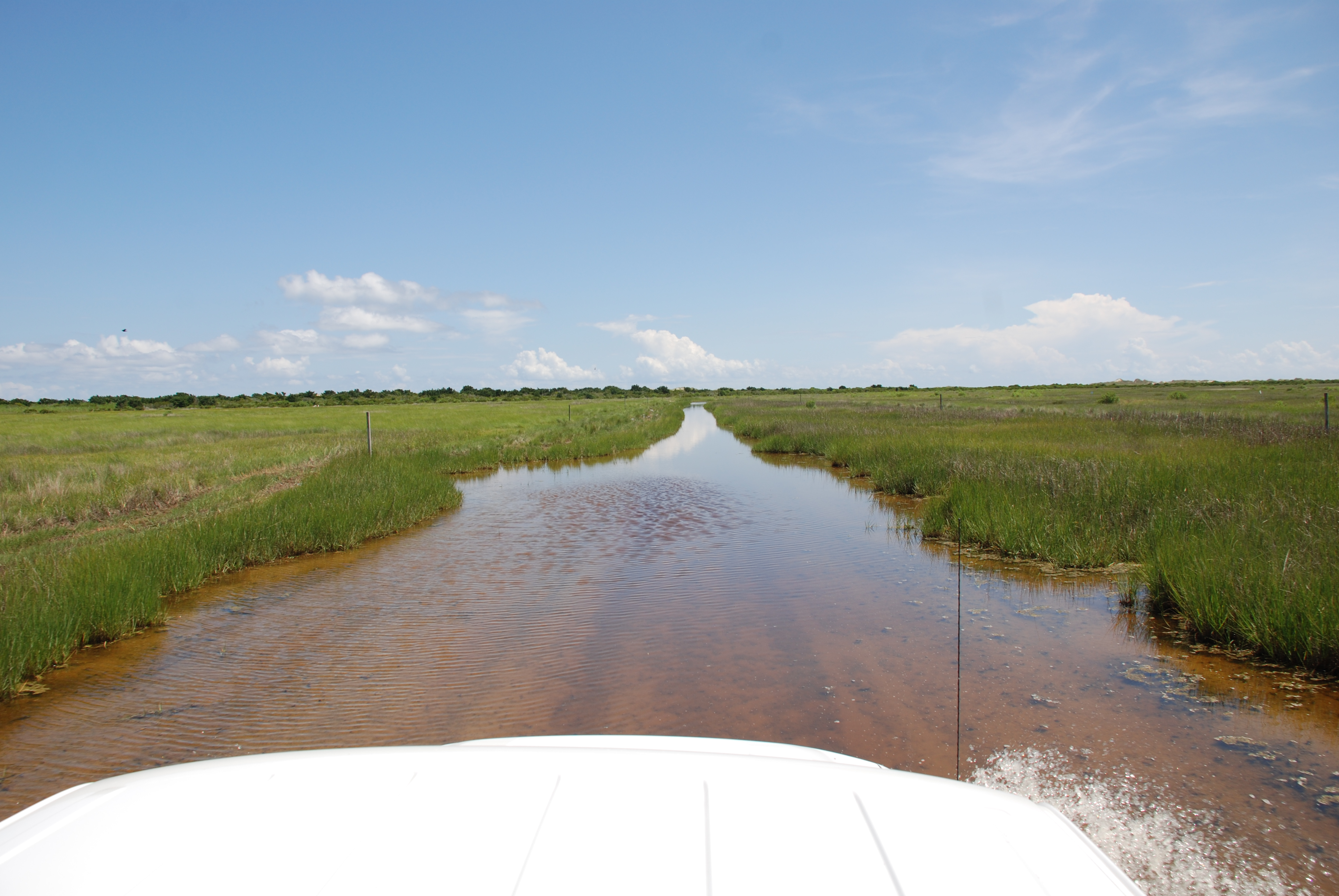
View from a truck driving on Portsmouth Flats Road separating Portsmouth from the rest of the North Core Banks. The road is usually covered in water.

Portsmouth is reached by a passenger ferry from Ocracoke village. It is also accessible by four wheel drive vehicles, which cross Core Sound by ferry from Atlantic and use the beach and tracks on North Core Banks.

== Portsmouth Island ==
Portsmouth Island lies to the east of North Core Banks, to which it is connected at most states of the tide. The limits of the island are not precisely determined and have varied over time. Older maps use the term for the island between Ocracoke Inlet and Whalebone Inlet (which closed in 1961, now the northern end of North Core Banks.)

== Climate ==
According to the Trewartha climate classification system, Portsmouth, North Carolina has a humid subtropical climate with hot and humid summers, cool winters and year-around precipitation (Cfak). Cfak climates are characterized by all months having an average mean temperature > 32.0 °F (> 0.0 °C), at least eight months with an average mean temperature ≥ 50.0 °F (≥ 10.0 °C), at least one month with an average mean temperature ≥ 71.6 °F (≥ 22.0 °C) and no significant precipitation difference between seasons. During the summer months in Portsmouth, a cooling afternoon sea breeze is present on most days, but episodes of extreme heat and humidity can occur with heat index values ≥ 100 °F (≥ 38 °C). Portsmouth is prone to hurricane strikes, particularly during the Atlantic hurricane season which extends from June 1 through November 30, sharply peaking from late August through September. During the winter months, episodes of cold and wind can occur with wind chill values < 15 °F (< -9 °C). The plant hardiness zone in Portsmouth is 8b with an average annual extreme minimum air temperature of 17.5 °F (-8.1 °C). The average seasonal (Dec-Mar) snowfall total is < 2 inches (< 5 cm), and the average annual peak in nor'easter activity is in February.

Climate data for Portsmouth, NC (1981-2010 Averages)
Month	Jan	Feb	Mar	Apr	May	Jun	Jul	Aug	Sep	Oct	Nov	Dec	Year
Mean daily maximum °F (°C)	53.1 (11.7)	54.9 (12.7)	60.5 (15.8)	68.4 (20.2)	75.5 (24.2)	82.9 (28.3)	86.3 (30.2)	85.7 (29.8)	81.4 (27.4)	73.3 (22.9)	65.3 (18.5)	56.9 (13.8)	70.4 (21.3)
Daily mean °F (°C)	45.8 (7.7)	47.5 (8.6)	52.9 (11.6)	60.9 (16.1)	68.5 (20.3)	76.4 (24.7)	80.2 (26.8)	79.4 (26.3)	75.3 (24.1)	66.7 (19.3)	58.3 (14.6)	49.8 (9.9)	63.5 (17.5)
Mean daily minimum °F (°C)	38.4 (3.6)	40.1 (4.5)	45.3 (7.4)	53.4 (11.9)	61.4 (16.3)	69.9 (21.1)	74.0 (23.3)	73.1 (22.8)	69.2 (20.7)	60.0 (15.6)	51.3 (10.7)	42.8 (6.0)	56.7 (13.7)
Average precipitation inches (mm)	4.71 (120)	3.88 (99)	4.67 (119)	3.64 (92)	3.80 (97)	4.04 (103)	4.92 (125)	7.22 (183)	6.44 (164)	5.09 (129)	4.36 (111)	3.96 (101)	56.73 (1,441)
Average relative humidity (%)	70.6	70.0	68.2	68.1	70.9	74.8	76.9	76.1	74.2	71.0	72.5	71.3	72.1
Average dew point °F (°C)	36.8 (2.7)	38.2 (3.4)	42.7 (5.9)	50.3 (10.2)	58.7 (14.8)	67.8 (19.9)	72.3 (22.4)	71.2 (21.8)	66.5 (19.2)	57.0 (13.9)	49.5 (9.7)	40.9 (4.9)	54.4 (12.4)
Source: PRISM

Climate data for Cape Hatteras, NC Ocean Water Temperature (33 NE Portsmouth)
Month	Jan	Feb	Mar	Apr	May	Jun	Jul	Aug	Sep	Oct	Nov	Dec	Year
Daily mean °F (°C)	49 (9)	46 (8)	52 (11)	59 (15)	68 (20)	74 (23)	78 (26)	80 (27)	77 (25)	70 (21)	58 (14)	55 (13)	64 (18)
Source: NOAA

== Ecology ==
According to the A. W. Kuchler U.S. potential natural vegetation types, Portsmouth, North Carolina would have a dominant vegetation type of Live oak/Sea Oats Uniola paniculata (90) with a dominant vegetation form of Coastal Prairie (20).

Preceded by Ocracoke Island	Beaches of The Outer Banks	Succeeded by Core Banks
