= Williston, North Carolina =

Unincorporated community in North Carolina, U.S.

Williston
- Unincorporated community
- Location within the state of North Carolina
- Coordinates: 34.78°N 76.50°W
- Country: United States
- State: North Carolina
- County: Carteret

Population
  - Estimate (2023): 34
- Time zone: UTC-5 (EST)
  - Summer (DST): UTC-4 (EDT)
- ZIP codes: 28579, 28589
- Area code: 252

Williston is an unincorporated community in Carteret County, North Carolina, United States.

== Geography ==
Williston is located in eastern Carteret County, within the Down East region. Nearby communities include Davis and Smyrna.

US 70 is the primary highway within Williston. NC 12 is located to the north of the community.

The ZIP codes for Williston are 28579 and 28589.

== Population ==
In 2023, the population estimate was 34.
