= High Tider =

Vocal accent in coastal North Carolina

- Hoi Toider
- Native to: North Carolina, Virginia, Maryland
- Region: Outer Banks, Pamlico Sound, Chesapeake Bay
- Ethnicity: Americans
- Native speakers: Unreported
- Language family: Indo-European: Germanic; West Germanic; Ingvaeonic; Anglo–Frisian; English; North American English; American English; Older Southern American English; High Tider
- Early forms: Old English: Middle English; 17th century Modern English

Language codes
- ISO 639-3: –
- Linguasphere: 52-ABA-che

High Tider, Hoi Toider, or Hoi Toide English is a family or continuum of American English dialects spoken in very limited communities of the South Atlantic United States, particularly several small islands and coastal townships. The exact areas include the rural "Down East" region of North Carolina, which encompasses the Outer Banks and Pamlico Sound—specifically Ocracoke, Atlantic, Davis, Sea Level, and Harkers Island in eastern Carteret County, and the village of Wanchese—plus the Chesapeake Bay, such as Smith Island in Maryland, as well as Guinea Neck and Tangier Island in Virginia. The High Tider sound has been observed as far west as Bertie County, North Carolina; the term is also a local nickname for any native-speaking resident of the relevant North Carolina region.

These dialects do not have a name that is uniformly used in the academic literature, with "Hoi Toider" used for the Outer Banks and mainly Ocracoke; rather, a variety of names exist based on location, such as Down East, Outer Banks, or Chesapeake Bay English, dialect, brogue, or accent. Most speakers in the Outer Banks themselves refer to their dialect as "the brogue". Ocracoke English and Smith Island English are the two best-studied varieties, with the linguists Walt Wolfram and Natalie Schilling researching them in detail since the 1990s.

The 2006 Atlas of North American English does not consider these dialects to fall under the Southern U.S. regional dialect since they do not participate in the first stage of the Southern Vowel Shift, but they share commonalities as full members of the larger Southeastern regional super-dialect in fronting the /oʊ/ and /aʊ/ vowels, exhibiting the pin–pen merger, resisting the cot–caught merger, and being strongly rhotic with a retroflex /r/.

== History ==
The term "hoi toide" appears in a local colloquial rhyme, "It's high tide on the sound side", often phonetically spelled "hoi toide on the saind soide" [hɒɪ ˈtɒɪd ɑn ðə ˈsaɪnd sɒɪd], as a marker of pronunciation to sharply differentiate speakers of the Outer Banks brogue from speakers of the mainland Southern dialects. The phrase was first recorded as a significant identifier of the dialect in 1993, and has since been used frequently for "performative" purposes by native speakers to demonstrate the dialect to outsiders.

With a long history of geographical and economic isolation from mainland North Carolina, Outer Banks areas such as Ocracoke Island, Harkers Island, and Atlantic developed a distinct dialect of English. Linguists who have studied this dialect note that it has "roots ... in a number of Early Modern English dialects", spoken in different parts of Britain between about 1650 and 1750. Following settlement, the dialect of these island communities developed in relative isolation for more than 250 years.

High Tider shares features with other dialects of the Atlantic coast of the U.S. Certain pronunciation, vocabulary, and grammatical constructions can be traced back to a mixture of the colonial English dialects of Ireland (including Scots-Irish dialects), eastern England, and southwestern England (compare the West Country dialects). The distinctness of the High Tider dialects has survived because of the inherent isolation of islands and these communities continuing to depend on traditional trades, like fishing, boat building, and decoy carving. Indeed, the coastal tourism trade is relatively recent, beginning only in the 2000s, on islands like Ocracoke, and still minimal on Smith Island.

As many as 500 islanders on Harkers Island are directly descended from the Harkers Island and Outer Banks original settlers that first developed this distinct dialect. Linguists from North Carolina State University, East Carolina University, and other academic institutions continue to conduct research on the island dialect. It has been in slow decline in the 21st century.

== Phonological features ==
The chart below lists the vowel sounds in two High Tider accents: one of Smith Island (Maryland) in the Chesapeake Bay and the other of Ocracoke (North Carolina) in the Outer Banks. The symbol "~" is used here to indicate that pronunciations on either side of it form a spectrum of possibilities. The symbol ">" indicates that the pronunciations to its left are more widespread and pronunciations to its right are more marginal. Phonologically, these two example accents are united under the High Tider dialect primarily by their similar /aɪ/ and /aʊ/ vowels; both also show a greater or lesser degree of "vowel breaking" (or drawling) of the front vowels especially when positioned before the ⟨sh⟩ consonant /ʃ/.

Pure vowels (monophthongs)
English diaphoneme	Smith Island	Ocracoke	Example words
/æ/	[æ~a]	[æ]	grab, lack, trap
/æ/ before /d, l, m, n, s, t, z/	[æ~a]	[æə~ɛə]	bad, dance, half
/æ/ before /ɡ, ŋ, ʃ/	[æ~a]	[æɪ]	ash, bag, tank
/ɑː/	[ɑ̈ː~aː]	[ɑ̈ː]~[ɑː] > [ɒ]	blah, calm, father
/ɒ/	[ɑ̈ː~aː]	[ɑ̈ː]~[ɑː] > [ɒ]	lot, fox, sock
/ɒ/ before /ʃ/	[ɑ̈ː~aː]	[ɒɪ]	wash
/ɔː/	[ɑo] > [ɑː~ɑ̈ː]	[ɔː~oː] > [ɑo]	dog, hawk, saw
/ɔː/ before /d, f, l, s, t, v, z/	[ɑo] > [ɑː~ɑ̈ː]	[oə]	all, cross, flawed
/ɛ/	[ɜ~ʌ]	[ɛ]	kept, method, wreck
/ɛ/ before /d, ð, f, l, m, n, s, t, v, z/ & esp. /ʃ/	[ɜ~ʌ] > [eɪ]	[eɪ]~[ɛə]	dress, fresh, mesh
/ɪ/	[ɪ]		blip, dig, tick
/ɪ/ before /d, ð, f, l, m, n, s, t, v, z/ & esp. /ʃ, tʃ/	[ɪ~ɛ] > [iɪ]	[iɪ]~[ɪə]	ditch, fish, kit
/iː/	[əɪ~ɜɪ]	[ɪ̈ɨ] > [ɪɨ]	beam, chic, fleet
/iː/ before /l/ (& occasionally /n, z/)	[əɪ~ɜɪ]	[iə]	eel, real
/i/ word-final	[ɪ]	[i] > [ɪ]	money
/ʌ/	[ɜ~ɛ]	[ɜ~ɛ]	bus, flood, what
/ʌ/ before /ʃ/	[ɜ~ɛ]	[ɜɪ]	gush, hush, Russia
/ʊ/ before /ʃ/	[ʊ]	[ʊɪ]	cushion, push
/uː/	[ɪ̈ː]	[ʊu~ɪ̈ː] > [uː]	food, glue, lute
Diphthongs
/aɪ/	[ɒɪ~ɑɪ~ʌɪ]	[əɪ]	ride, shine, try
/aʊ/	[ɜɪ] > [aʊ~äɪ]	[aʊ~äɪ]	now, loud, sow
/aʊ/ before /s, θ, t, tʃ/	[ɜɪ] > [aʊ~äɪ]	[aʊ] > [ɐʊ]	house, ouch, scout
/aʊ/ before /l, r/	[ɜɪ] > [aʊ~äɪ]	[aʊ]	howl, power, tower
/eɪ/	[æɪ~aɪ]	[ɜɪ~ɛɪ]	lame, rein, plate
/eɪ/ before /l/	[æɪ~aɪ]	[eə]	nail, sail, pale
/ɔɪ/	[ɔɪ]		boy, choice, moist
/oʊ/	[œʊ] > [oʊ]		goat, oh, show
/oʊ/ unstressed and word-final	[ɚ]		fellow, mosquito
R-colored vowels
/ɑːr/	[ɑɚ~ɑːɻ]		barn, car, park
/aɪər/	[ɑɚ~ɑːɻ]		fire, lyre, tired
/ɛər/	[ɛɚ] > [æɚ]		bare, bear, there
/ɜːr/	[əɻ~ɚ]	[ɝ~ʌɻ]	burn, first, learn
/ər/	[əɻ~ɚ]	[əɻ~ɚ]	doctor, letter, martyr
/ɔːr/	[oʊɚ~oʊɻ]		course, shore, tour

The phonology, or pronunciation system, of High Tider English is highly different from the English spoken in the rest of the United States. The High Tider dialect is marked with numerous unique phonological features and sound changes:

- The /aɪ/ diphthong is [ɑe~ɑɪ], starting very far back in the mouth and retaining its glide, unlike its neighboring Southern dialects. It may also begin with a round-lipped quality, thus [ɒe], or may even have a triphthongal quality as [ɐɑe]. Thus, a word like high may sound like something between HAW-ee and HUH-ee, similar to its sound in Cockney or broad Australian accents. (This is sometimes mischaracterized by outsiders as sounding very close, like [ɔɪ] (the CHOICE vowel, leading to the spelling "Hoi Toider" for "High Tider.") On Smith Island, the on-glide is not backed but centralized—thus, [əɪ]—and is not as commonly identified by its residents as a marker of local identity.
  - Realization of /aɪəɹ/ as [äːɻ], so that fire may begin to merge with the sound of far, as well as tire with tar.
- The /aʊ/ diphthong ends with a more fronted quality, commonly realized as a shorter off-glide with little or no rounding [æɵ~æø~æɛ~æː~ɐ̟ɤ]. The sound has also been described as [ɛɪ~ɜɪ], with a very raised beginning (or on-glide) to the diphthong; for example, making town sound like teh-een.
- Front vowel raising in certain environments, though most noticeably before /ʃ/ and /tʃ/:
  - Merger of /ɪ/ and /i/, as in the characteristic pronunciation of fish as feesh /fiːʃ/ or kitchen as keetchen /ˈkiːtʃən/. This may be represented as [iː(ə)] or [ɪ̝(ː)].
  - Raising of /ɛ/ in this environment, causing mesh to sound almost like maysh.
- The r-colored vowel /ɛər/ may have an opener vowel sound: [æɚ~aɚ], making the sound of fair almost merge with fire and far.
- There is no cot–caught merger.
- The /oʊ/ vowel is largely fronted, as in much of the rest of the modern-day South: [ɜʉ~ɜy~œʊ].
  - Unstressed, word-final /oʊ/ may be pronounced [ɚ], causing yellow to sound like yeller, fellow like feller, potato like (po)tater, and mosquito like (mo)skeeter.
- Elision of some medial or final stops, as in cape sounding more like cay.
- Strong, bunched-tongue rhoticity, similar to West Country English, Scottish English, or Irish English
- Pin–pen merger.

== Lexical features ==
These island dialects exhibit unique vocabulary in regular usage. Some examples include mommick, meaning "to frustrate" or "bother", yethy, describing stale or unpleasant odor, and nicket, meaning a pinch of something used as in cooking. The islanders have also developed unique local words used in regular conversation, including dingbatter to refer to a visitor or recent arrival to the island, and dit-dot, a term developed from a joke about Morse code, and used to describe any visitor to the island who has difficulty understanding the local dialect.

== In popular culture ==
In the 1991 film The Butcher's Wife, the main character Marina is from Ocracoke, North Carolina, and exhibits features of Hoi Toider dialect.

== Bibliography ==
- Thomas, Erik R. (2006), "Rural White Southern Accents" (PDF), Atlas of North American English (online), Walter de Gruyter, archived from the original (PDF) on 2014-12-22
- Wolfram, Walt; Schilling-Estes, Natalie (1997), Hoi Toide on the Outer Banks: The Story of the Ocracoke Brogue, University of North Carolina Press, ISBN 0-8078-4626-0
- Wolfram, Walt; Reaser, Jeffrey (2014). Talkin' Tar Heel : How Our Voices Tell the Story of North Carolina. Chapel Hill: The University of North Carolina Press. ISBN 978-1-4696-1437-3.
