= Older Southern American English =

Former set of American dialects

- Region: Southern United States
- Language family: Indo-European: Germanic; West Germanic; North Sea Germanic; Anglo–Frisian; Anglic; English; North American English; American English; Older Southern American English
- Early forms: Old English: Middle English; Early Modern English
- Writing system: Latin (English alphabet)

Language codes
- ISO 639-3: –
- Glottolog: None

Speech example
An example of a South Carolinian man born in 1902, whose speech contains elements of a non-rhotic Plantation Southern accent (Strom Thurmond).

Older Southern American English is a diverse set of English dialects of the Southern United States spoken most widely during the mid-19th century, gradually transforming among its White speakers—possibly first due to economy-driven migrations following the American Civil War—up until the mid-20th century. By then, these local dialects had largely consolidated into, or been replaced by, a more regionally unified Southern American English. Meanwhile, among Black Southerners, these dialects transformed into a fairly stable African-American Vernacular English, now spoken nationwide among Black people. Certain features unique to older Southern U.S. English persist today, like non-rhoticity, though typically only among Black speakers or among very localized White speakers.

== History ==
This group of American English dialects evolved over two hundred years from the older varieties of British English primarily spoken by those who initially settled the area. Given that language is an entity that is constantly changing, the English varieties of the colonists were quite different from any variety of English spoken today. In the early 1600s, the initial English-speaking settlers of the Tidewater area of Virginia, the first permanent English colony in North America, spoke a variety of Early Modern English, which itself was diverse. The older Southern dialects thus originated in varying degrees from a mix of the speech of these and later immigrants from many different regions of the British Isles who moved to the American South in the 17th and 18th centuries, as well as perhaps the English, creole, and post-creole speech of African and African-American slaves.

One theory of historian David Hackett Fischer's book Albion's Seed is that indentured servants chiefly from England's South and Midlands primarily settled the Tidewater (Virginia) region and poor Northern English and Ulster Scots families primarily settled the Appalachian Southern backcountry, so that the Tidewater and backcountry dialects were most directly influenced by those two immigrant populations, respectively. Indeed, the Appalachian dialect shows such likely immigrant influences as evidenced by, for example, their consistent preservation of rhoticity. However, linguists have disputed many of the specifics of Fischer's theory, instead arguing that dialect-mixing in both regions was in fact more varied and widespread. For example, an Appalachian Journal linguistic article reveals the flawed premises and misrepresentation of sources in Albion's Seed and asserts that the early Southern dialects are actually difficult to trace to any singular influence.

In the decades following the American Revolution of the 1760s to 1780s, major population centers of the coastal American South, such as Norfolk, Virginia, and Charleston, South Carolina, maintained strong commercial and cultural ties to southern England around London. Thus, as the upper-class standard dialect around London changed, some of its features were mirrored by: the dialects of upper-class Americans in eastern Virginia and the Charleston area, followed by the dialects of the surrounding regions in general, regardless of socioeconomic class. One such example accent feature is the "r-dropping" (or non-rhoticity) of the late 18th and early 19th century, resulting in the similar r-dropping found in these American areas during the cultural "Old South". Contrarily, in Southern areas away from the major coasts and plantations (like Appalachia), on certain isolated islands, and variously among lower-class White speakers, accents mostly remained rhotic. Another example feature is the British-style trap–bath split, which also helped define the eastern Virginia accent. The split was also adopted in the Gulf, Appalachian, and plantation regions of the South, though with their own articulation distinct from the British one. (The feature is extinct in virtually all these areas today.)

By the time of the American Civil War in the 1860s, many different Southern accents had developed, namely: eastern Virginia accents (including Tidewater accents), Lowcountry (or Charleston) accents, Appalachian accents, Plantation accents (those primarily of the Black Belt region), and accents in the secluded Pamlico and Chesapeake islands.

=== Decline ===
After the Civil War, the growth of timber, coal, railroad, steel, textile, and tobacco mill industries throughout the South, along with the whole country's resulting migration changes, likely contributed to the expansion of a more unified Southern accent (now associated with the 20th century), which gradually ousted 19th-century Southern accents. The South's 19th-century linguistic prestige was rooted in the plantation areas and higher-class White people, including features such as non-rhoticity. However, by the mid-20th century, linguistic features originating from Texas, Appalachian towns, and lower-class White people—such as rhoticity—were suddenly expanding throughout all the Southern States.

Also, before World War II, the demographic tendency of the South was out-migration, but after the war a counter-tendency emerged in the Southern cities, which received masses of migrant workers from the North: another possible motivation for the abandonment of older Southern accent features. Finally, the Civil Rights Movement seems to have led White and Black Southerners alike to resist accent features associated with the other racial group and even develop newly distinguishing features, which may have further contributed to the sudden mid-20th-century adoption of rhoticity among White Southerners of all classes, despite continuing non-rhoticity among Black Americans. Today, this linguistic divide on the basis of rhoticity, alongside other accent features, largely persists between Black versus White Southerners.

== Phonology ==
=== General Older South ===
The phonologies of early Southern English in the United States were diverse. The following pronunciation features were very generally characteristic of the older Southern region as a whole:

A list of typical older Southern vowels
English diaphoneme	Old Southern phoneme	Example words
/aɪ/	[aɪ~æɛ~aæ]	bride, prize, tie
/aɪ/	[ai~aæ]	bright, price, tyke
/æ/	[æ] (or [æɛæ~ɐɛɐ], often before /d/)	cat, trap, yak
/æ/	[æɛæ~eə]	hand, man, slam
/æ/	[æɛ~æe]	bath, can't, pass
/aʊ/	[æɒ~æɔ]	mouth, ow, sound
/ɑː/	[ɑ] or [ɒ]	father, laager, palm
/ɑr/	[ɑː~ɒː] (non-rhotic) or [ɒɻ] (rhotic)	ark, heart, start
/ɒ/	[ɑ]	bother, lot, wasp
/eɪ/	[ɛɪ~ei] or [eː] (plantation possibility)	face, rein, play
/ɛ/	[ɛ] (or [eiə], often before /d/)	dress, egg, head
/ɜr/	[ɜɪ~əɪ] (non-rhotic before a consonant) or [ɜː] (non-rhotic) or [ɜɚ] (rhotic)	nurse, search, worm
/iː/	[iː~ɪi]	fleece, me, neat
/ɪ/	[ɪ]	kit, mid, pick
/ɪ/	[ɪ]	happy, money, sari
/oʊ/	[ɔu~ɒu] (after late 1800s) or [oː~uː] (plantation possibility)	goat, no, throw
/ɔ/	[ɔo]	thought, vault, yawn
/ɔ/	[ɔo]	cloth, lost, off
/ɔɪ/	[ɔoɪ] or [oɛ~oə] (plantation possibility)	choice, joy, loin
/ʌ/	[ɜ] or [ʌ] (plantation possibility)	strut, tough, won

- Lack of Yod-dropping: Pairs like do and due, or toon and tune, were often distinct in these dialects because words like due, lute, new, etc. historically contained a diphthong similar to /ju/ (like the you sound in cute or puny). (as England's RP standard pronunciation still does), but Labov et al. report that the only Southern speakers who make a distinction today use a diphthong /ɪu/ in such words. They further report that speakers with the distinction are found primarily in North Carolina and northwest South Carolina, and in a corridor extending from Jackson to Tallahassee. For most of the South, this feature began disappearing after World War II.
  - Yod-coalescence: Words like dew were pronounced as "Jew", and Tuesday as "choose day."
- Wine–whine distinction: distinction between "w" and "wh" in words like "wine" and "whine", "witch and "which", etc.
- Horse–hoarse distinction: distinction between pairs of words like "horse" and "hoarse", "for" and "four", etc.
- Rhoticity and non-rhoticity: The pronunciation of the r sound only before or between vowels, but not after vowels, is known as non-rhoticity and was historically associated with the major plantation regions of the South: specifically, the entire Piedmont and most of the South's Atlantic Coast in a band going west towards the Mississippi River, as well as all of the Mississippi Embayment and some of the western Gulf Coastal Plain. This was presumably influenced by the non-rhotic East Anglia and London England pronunciation. Additionally, some older Southern dialects were even "variably non-rhotic in intra-word intervocalic contexts, as in carry [kʰæi]." Rhotic accents of the older Southern dialects, which fully pronounce all historical r sounds, were somewhat rarer and primarily spoken in Appalachia, the eastern Gulf Coastal Plain, and the areas west of the Mississippi Embayment.
- Palatalization of /k/ and /g/ before /ɑr/: Especially in the older South along the Atlantic Coast, the consonants /k/ (as in key or coo) and /ɡ/ (as in guy or go), when before the sound /ɑːr/ (as in car or barn), were often pronounced with the tongue fronted towards the hard palate. Thus, for example, garden in older Southern was something like "gyah(r)den" [ˈgjɑ(ɹ)dən] and "cart" like "kyah(r)t" [cʰjɑ(ɹ)t]. This pronunciation feature was in decline by the late 1800s.
- Lack or near-lack of /aɪ/ glide weakening: The gliding vowel in words like prize (but less commonly in price or other situations of this vowel appearing before a voiceless consonant) commonly has a "weakened" glide today in the South; however, this only became a documented feature since the last quarter of the 1800s and was otherwise absent or inconsistent in earlier Southern dialects. Today, the lack of glide weakening persists in the High Tider and updated Lowcountry accents. Full weakening has become a defining feature only of the modern Southern dialects, particularly the most advanced sub-varieties.
- Mary–marry–merry distinction: Unlike most of the U.S. and modern Southern, older Southern did not merge the following three vowels before /r/: [e~eə] (as in Mary), [æ] (as in marry), and [ɛ] (as in merry). Although the three are now merging or merged in modern Southern English, the "marry" class of words remains the least likely among modern Southerners to merge with the other two.
- Clear /l/ between front vowels: Unlike modern Southern and General American English's universally "dark" /l/ sound (often represented as [ɫ]), older Southern pronunciation had a "clear" (i.e. non-velarized) /l/ sound whenever /l/ appears between front vowels, as in the words silly, mealy, Nellie, etc.
- Was, what and of pronounced with [ɑ]: The stressed word what, for example, rhymed with cot (not with cut, as it does elsewhere in the U.S.).
- No happy-tensing: The final vowel of words like happy, silly, monkey, parties, etc. were not tensed as they are in newer Southern and other U.S. dialects, meaning that this vowel sounded more like the [ɪ] of fit than the [i] of feet.
- /oʊ/, as in goat, toe, robe, etc., kept a back starting place (unlike most Southern since World War II, but like most Northern U.S. dialects today); this became an opener [ɔu~ɒu] in the early 1900s. The modern fronted form of the Atlantic South started as far back as the 1800s in northeastern North Carolina, in the form [ɜy], but only spread slowly, until accelerating after World War II.
- /ʃr/ pronounced as [sɹ] (e.g. causing shrimp, shrub, etc. to sound like srimp, srub, etc.); this feature was reported earliest in Virginia.

==== Plantation South ====
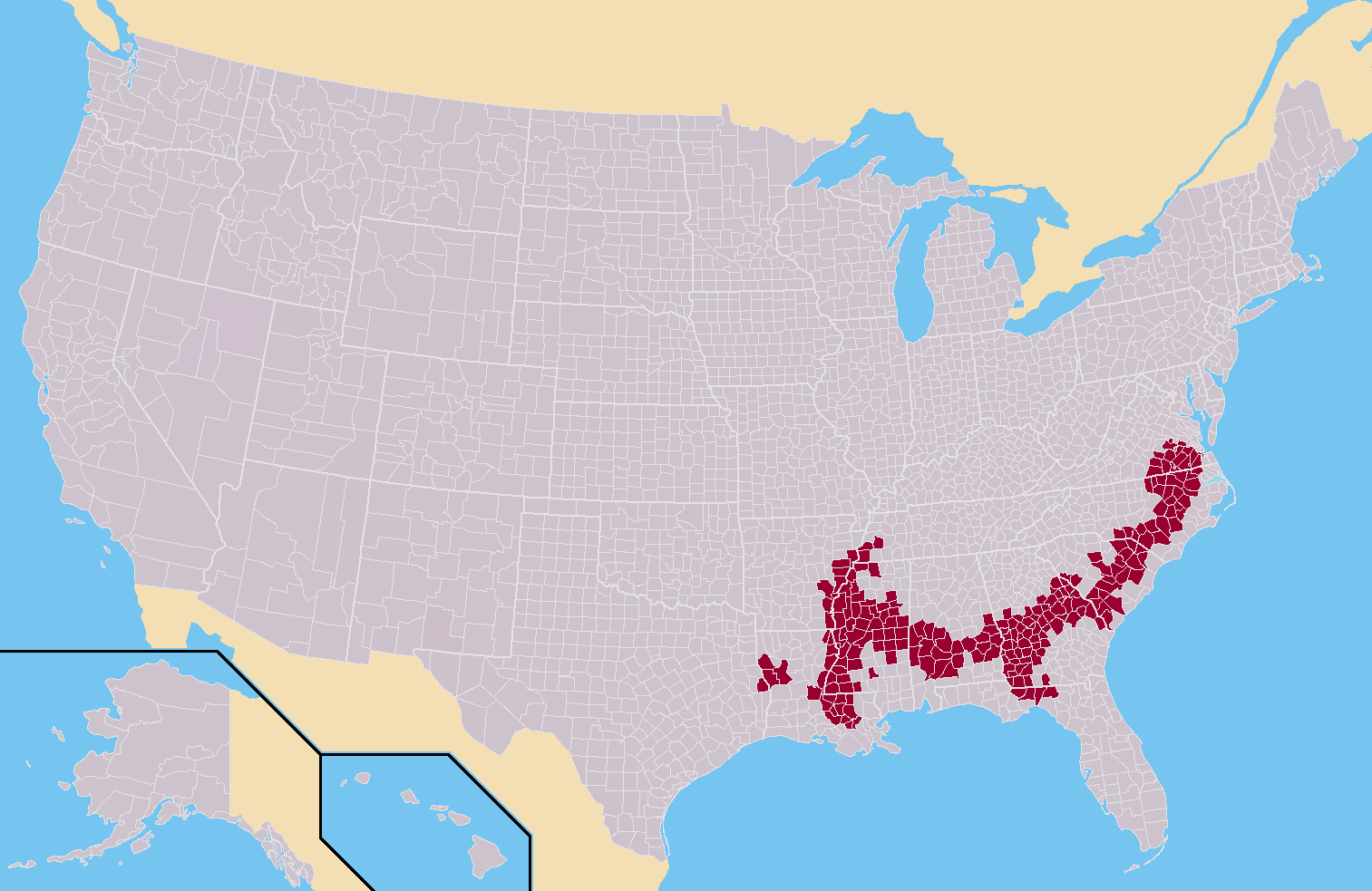
The area in dark purple approximates the Plantation Southern dialect region, excluding the Lowcountry (the Atlantic coast of South Carolina and Georgia).

Older speech of the Plantation South included those features above, plus:

- Non-rhoticity: R-dropping historically occurred in the greater central sections of Georgia, Alabama, and Mississippi, and in coastal Texas and some other coastal communities of the Gulf states. Rhoticity (or r-fulness) was more likely in the southernmost sections of Georgia, Alabama, and Mississippi, as well as in northern Florida, western Louisiana, and eastern Texas.
- Trap–bath split: Words like bath, dance, and ask, used a different vowel ([æ̈ɛ~æ̈e]) than words like trap, cat, and rag ([æ~æ̈ɛæ̈]). A similarly organized (though different-sounding) split occurs in Standard British English.
- /eɪ/, as in face, was inconsistently pronounced [e̝ː].
- /oʊ/, as in goat, was inconsistently pronounced [o̝ː].
- /ʌ/, as in strut, was conservative.
- /ɔɪ/, as in choice, was [oɛ~oə].
- /ɜːr/, as in nurse, was predominantly up-gliding, non-rhotic [ɜɪ] in the "Deep South" (all the Plantation South except North Carolina).

=== Appalachia ===
Due to the former isolation of some regions of the Appalachian South, a unique Appalachian accent developed. This dialect is rhotic, meaning speakers consistently preserve the historical phoneme /r/. Moreover, Appalachians may even insert it innovatively into certain words (for example, "worsh" or "warsh" for "wash").

The Southern Appalachian dialect could be heard, as its name implies, in north Georgia, north Alabama, east Tennessee, northwestern South Carolina, western North Carolina, eastern Kentucky, southwestern Virginia, western Maryland, and West Virginia. Southern Appalachian speech patterns, however, are not entirely confined to the mountain regions previously listed.

The dialect here is often thought to be a window into the past, with various claims having been made that it is either a surviving pocket of Elizabethan English or the way that the people of Scotch-Irish origin that make up a large fraction of the population there would have spoken back when they first migrated and settled there. However, these are both incorrect. Though some of the distinctive words used in Appalachia have their origins in the Anglo-Scottish border region, a more realistic comparison is the way that some people in North America would have spoken in the colonial period.

Researchers have noted that the dialect retains a lot of vocabulary with roots in "Early Modern English" owing to the make-up of the early European settlers to the area.

=== Charleston ===
The Lowcountry, most famously centering on the cities of Charleston, South Carolina and Savannah, Georgia, once constituted its own entirely unique English dialect region (Linguasphere: 52-ABA-chg). Traditionally often recognized as a Charleston accent, it included these additional features, most of which no longer exist today:

- Cheer–chair merger towards [ɪə~eə].
- Non-rhoticity (or r-dropping).
- A possibility of both variants of Canadian raising:
  - /aɪ/ pronounced as something like as [ɑe], but possibly [ɐɪ] before a voiceless consonant.
  - /aʊ/ pronounced as [aʊ], but [əʉ~ɜʉ] before a voiceless consonant.
- /eɪ/ pronounced as [ɪə~eə] in a closed syllable, [ɪː~eː] in an open syllable.
- /oʊ/ pronounced as [oə~uə] in a closed syllable, [o~u] in an open syllable.
- /ɔː/ pronounced as [ɔ~o].
- /ɑː/ pronounced as [ɑ~ɒ], with possible remnant pronunciations using even older [æ].
- /ɜːr/ pronounced as [ɜ~ɞ], or possibly [əɪ]
- /uː/ pronounced as [ʉː] or [ᵿʉ].

=== Pamlico and Chesapeake ===
The "Down East" Outer Banks coastal region of Carteret County, North Carolina, and adjacent Pamlico Sound, including Ocracoke and Harkers Island, are known for additional features, some of which are still spoken today by generations-long residents of its unincorporated coastal and island communities, which have largely been geographically and economically isolated from the rest of North Carolina and the South since their first settlement by English-speaking Europeans. The same is true for the very similar dialect area of the Delmarva (Delaware–Maryland–Virginia) Peninsula and neighboring islands in the Chesapeake Bay, such as Tangier and Smith Island. These two regions historically share many common pronunciation features, sometimes collectively called a High Tider (or "Hoi Toider") accent, including:

- Rhoticity (or r-fulness, like in most U.S. English, but unlike in most other older Atlantic Southern dialects)
- /aɪ/, such as the vowel in the words high tide, retaining its glide and being pronounced beginning further back in the mouth, as [ɑe] or even rounded [ɒe~ɐɒe], often stereotyped as sounding like "hoi toid," giving Pamlico Sound's residents the name "High Tiders."
- /æ/ is raised to [ɛ] (so cattle sounds like kettle); /ɛ/ is raised to [e~ɪ] (so that mess sounds like miss); and, most prominently, /ɪ/ is raised to [i] (so fish sounds like feesh). This mirrors the second and third stages of the Southern Vowel Shift, despite this particular accent never participating in the very first stage of the shift.
- /ɔː/ pronounced as [ɔ~o], similar to modern Australian or London English.
- /aʊ/, as in loud, town, scrounge, etc., pronounced with a fronted glide as [aɵ~aø~aε]. Before a voiceless consonant, this same phoneme is [ɜʉ~ɜy].
- /ɛər/, as in chair, square, bear, etc., as [æɚ].
- Card–cord merger since at least the 1800s in the Delmarva Peninsula.

=== Piedmont and Tidewater Virginia ===
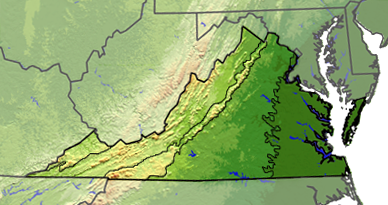
The old Virginia accent was (and to an extent, still is) mostly spoken in the central and eastern regions of the state, excluding the Eastern Shore of Virginia on the Delmarva Peninsula.

The people of the major central (Piedmont) and eastern (Tidewater) regions of Virginia, excluding Virginia's Eastern Shore, once spoke in a way long associated with the upper or aristocratic plantation class in the Old South. Additional phonological features of Virginian Piedmont (Linguasphere: 52-ABA-chc), Tidewater, and this Atlantic Southern variety include:

- Non-rhoticity (or r-dropping).
- A possibility of both variants of Canadian raising:
  - /aʊ/ pronounced as [aʊ], but as [əʉ~ɜʉ] before a voiceless consonant.
  - /aɪ/ pronounced as something like [aε~aæ~aə], but possibly [ɐɪ] before a voiceless consonant.
- /ɛər/ pronounced as [æː(ə)].
- /eɪ/ pronounced as [ɛ] in certain words, making bake sound like "beck", and afraid like "uh Fred."
- /uː/ pronounced as [ʉː] or [ᵿʉ].

In Virginia's Tidewater region particularly, these further features became associated with the label Tidewater accent (linguasphere: 52-ABA-chd):

- /ɔːr/, /ɔː/, /ɑː/, and /ɑːr/ all potentially merge (as well as a small number of words that have /æ/ in other American dialects, namely aunt, rather, and, earlier, pasture: an imitation of the British-style trap-bath split). The merged vowel is long, low-back, and rounded: [ɒː] or [ɒɒ̝]. Examples words for each traditional phoneme include more, maw, ma, and mar, respectively.
- /ɜːr/, as in bird, earth, flirt, hurt, word, dirt, etc. pronounced with a weak /r/ consonant as [ɜʴ], or a less common variant without /r/: [ɜ].

=== Gulf Coast ===
Southern Louisiana, as well as some of southeast Texas (Houston to Beaumont), and coastal Mississippi, feature a number of dialects influenced by other languages beyond English. The older English of Southern Louisiana (Linguasphere: 52-ABA-chi) did not participate in certain general older Southern English phenomena, for example lacking the Plantation South's trap–bath split and the fronting of /aʊ/. New Orleans English was likely developing in the early 20th century, in large part due to dialect influence from New York City migrants in New Orleans.

Most of southern Louisiana constitutes Acadiana, dominated for hundreds of years by monolingual speakers of Cajun French, which combines elements of Acadian French with other French and Spanish words. This French dialect is spoken by many of the older members of the Cajun ethnic group and is said to be dying out, although it is experiencing a minor resurgence among younger Franco-Louisianaise. Louisiana Creole, a creole language of various West and Central African languages, lexified by French, English, and Spanish words, also exists.

== Grammar and vocabulary ==
- Zero copula in third person plural and second person. This is historically a consequence of R-dropping, with e.g. you're merging with you.
  You [Ø] taller than Louise.
  They [Ø] gonna leave today (Cukor-Avila, 2003).
- Use of the circumfix a- . . . -in' in progressive tenses.
  He was a-hootin' and a-hollerin'.
  The wind was a-howlin'.
- The use of like to to mean nearly.
  I like to had a heart attack. (I nearly had a heart attack)
- The use of the simple past infinitive vs present perfect infinitive.
  I like to had. vs I like to have had.
  We were supposed to went. vs We were supposed to have gone.
- Use of "yonder" as a locative in addition to its more widely attested use as an adjective.
  They done gathered a mess of raspberries in them woods down yonder.

== Current projects ==
A project devised by Old Dominion University Assistant Professor Dr. Bridget Anderson entitled Tidewater Voices: Conversations in Southeastern Virginia was initiated in late 2008. In collecting oral histories from natives of the area, this study offers insight to not only specific history of the region, but also to linguistic phonetic variants native to the area as well. This linguistic survey is the first of its kind in nearly forty years. The two variants being analyzed the most closely in this study are the /aʊ/ diphthong as in house or brown and post-vocalic r-lessness as in /ˈfɑðə/ for /ˈfɑðər/.
