= Tidewater (region) =

Reference to the north Atlantic coastal plain region

Coordinates: 36°53′N 76°28′W

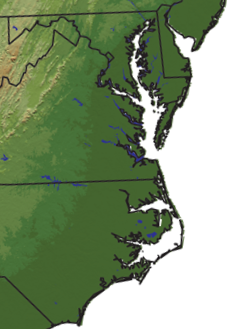
Painted relief map of the Tidewater region on the east coast of the United States in darkest green to one shade lighter green to the west.

"Tidewater" is a term for the north Atlantic Plain region of the United States. It is located east of the Atlantic Seaboard Fall Line and north of the Deep South. It encompasses the Chesapeake Bay and includes Delaware, the remainder of the Delmarva Peninsula, Southern Maryland and the Eastern Shore of Maryland, Washington, D.C., Eastern Virginia, and Eastern North Carolina.

== Definition ==
Culturally, the Tidewater region usually includes the low-lying plains of southeast Virginia, northeastern North Carolina, southern Maryland and the Chesapeake Bay.

The cultural Tidewater region got its name from the effects of the changing tides on local rivers, sounds, and the ocean. The area has a centuries-old cultural heritage that sets the Tidewater region apart from the adjacent inland parts of the United States, especially with respect to its distinctive dialects of English, which are gradually disappearing, along with its islands and its receding shoreline.

== Geography ==
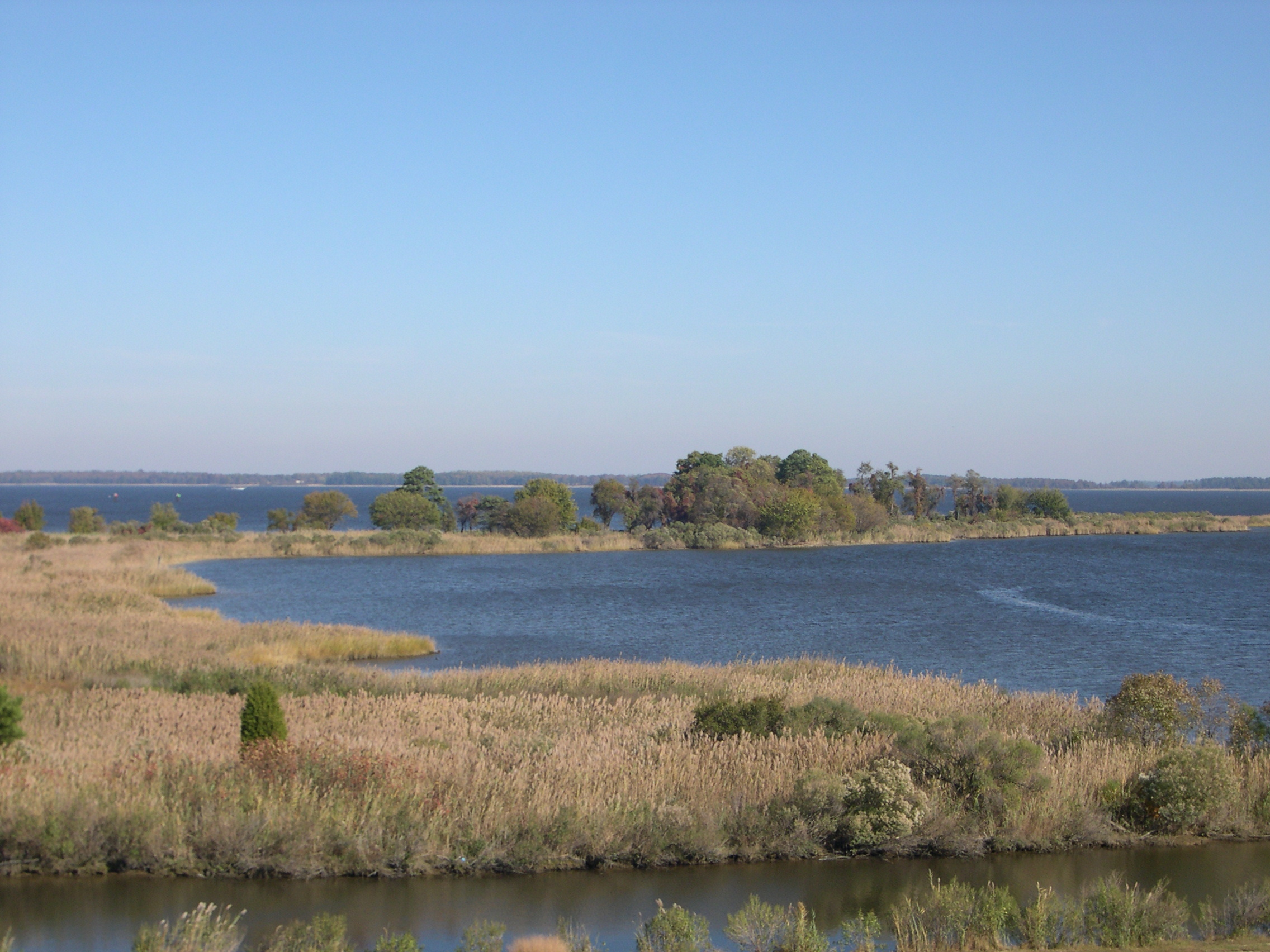
Tidal wetlands of the Chesapeake Bay

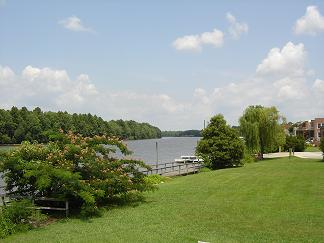
Roanoke River National Wildlife Refuge as seen from Plymouth, North Carolina

The tidewater region developed when sea level rose after the last ice age, resulting in the flooding of river valleys in the coastal plain. Such flooded river valleys now make up the tidewater since tides continue to affect water levels far inland, in some cases all the way west to the Fall Line. It is generally flat and low, with large expanses near the tidal shorelines composed of tidal marsh and swamp. Much of the area is covered with pocosin and the higher areas are used for agricultural farmlands. Geographically, in North Carolina and Virginia the Tidewater area is the land between the Suffolk Scarp and the Atlantic Ocean. In Maryland the Tidewater area is the flooded river areas below the Fall Line. The Hampton Roads area of Virginia is considered to be a Tidewater region. Southern Maryland and the Eastern Shore, parts of Delaware round out the northern part of the region on the Chesapeake and Delaware Bays.

The term tidewater may be correctly applied to all portions of any area, including Virginia, where the water level is affected by the tides (more specifically, where the water level rises when the tide comes in). In the case of Virginia, the Tidewater region includes the land east of the Fall Line, the natural border with the Piedmont Region. It includes Hampton Roads, the rest of the Virginia Peninsula, the Middle Peninsula, the Northern Neck, and the Eastern Shore.

Planters in the early American colonies extended their tobacco and peanut productions above the Fall Line, where waterfalls or rapids mark the end of the Tidewater and the beginning of the foothill region known as the Piedmont.

Tidewater is host to flora commonly associated with the South Atlantic pine forests and lower Southeast Coastal Plain maritime flora, the latter found primarily in southeastern Virginia.

== Politics ==
The Tidewater region has remained politically competitive since the 2010s, even as much of the rest of the Southern United States has aligned towards the Republican Party. It contains the states of Delaware, Maryland, Virginia, and North Carolina, as well as Washington, D.C.. The heavily Democratic Northeast megalopolis includes Maryland, Delaware, and Northern Virginia. The Eastern Shore of Maryland is strongly Republican.

As of 2026, Democrats hold the governorships of Delaware, Maryland, North Carolina, and the Commonwealth of Virginia.

== Regional accents ==
A distinctive non-rhotic accent of the Old South was spoken in the Tidewater coastal region of Virginia. Commonly known as a Tidewater accent, it is best associated with upper-class white speakers of the 19th and early 20th centuries. In the actual islands of the Chesapeake themselves, a separate rhotic accent survives among the locals.

== See also ==
- Hampton Roads
- Inner Banks
- Southern Maryland
- Eastern Shore (Maryland)
- Eastern Shore (Virginia)
