= Lola, North Carolina =

Unincorporated community in North Carolina, U.S.

Lola
- Unincorporated community
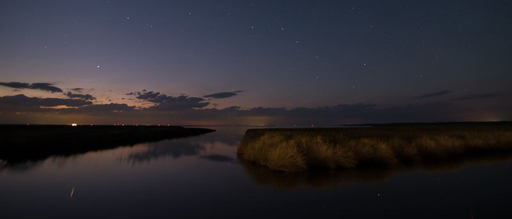
- Cedar Island National Wildlife Refuge, near Lola

- Location within the U.S. state of North Carolina
- Coordinates: 34.95°N 76.27°W
- Country: United States
- State: North Carolina
- County: Carteret
- Time zone: UTC-5 (EST)
  - Summer (DST): UTC-4 (EDT)
- ZIP Code: 28520
- Area code: 252

Lola is an unincorporated community in Carteret County, North Carolina, United States. It is an enclave within the community of Cedar Island.

== Geography ==
Lola is located in northeastern Carteret County, within the southeastern portion of Cedar Island.

The ZIP Code for Lola is 28520.

NC 12 and Lola Road are the primary routes within the community.
