= Cedar Island, North Carolina =

Island and unincorporated community in North Carolina, US

Cedar Island
- Unincorporated community
- Location within the state of North Carolina
- Coordinates: 35°00′18″N 76°18′34″W
- Country: United States
- State: North Carolina
- County: Carteret
- Time zone: UTC-5 (EST)
  - Summer (DST): UTC-4 (EDT)
- ZIP Code: 28520
- Area code: 252

Cedar Island is an island and unincorporated community in Carteret County, North Carolina. It is located in the Down East region of coastal North Carolina.

In 2022, the population was estimated to be 170.

The ZIP Code for Cedar Island is 28520.

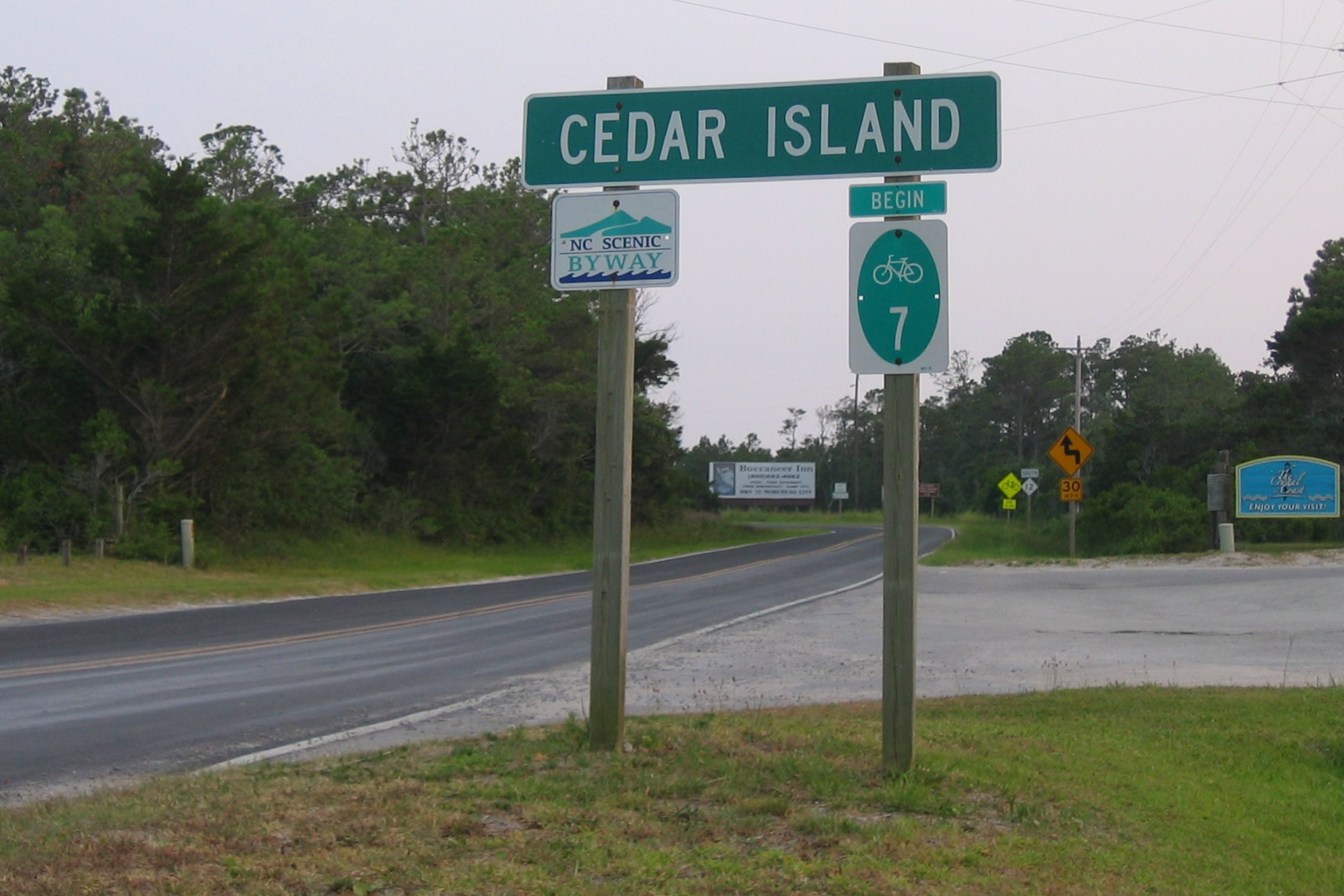
Cedar Island sign, 2008

== History ==
Cedar Island was home to a local Native American population prior to the arrival of European settlers.

In 2019, Hurricane Dorian brought 9 feet of storm surge over the island and damaged one-third of the buildings. 28 feral horses and approximately 15 feral (or abandoned) cows were swept away. Three cows were later found on North Core Banks, having swum at least four miles, but possibly up to 40 miles after being in the water for 12–24 hours.

== Roads and ferry access ==
There are only two main roads within Cedar Island. Northbound NC-12 is the only way to access Cedar Island without using a ferry connection. This crosses the Monroe Gaskill Memorial Bridge.

Southbound NC-12 continues from the ferry terminal across Cedar Island to meet with U.S. Route 70 on the mainland, near the community of Sea Level.

The Cedar Island ferry terminal provides access to Swan Quarter and Ocracoke Island, both across the Pamlico Sound.

== Amenities ==
Many residents are fishermen, though fishing is declining in the area. The other major employer is the North Carolina Ferry System. There are three churches on the island: Methodist, Free Will Baptist, and Primitive Baptist. The Methodist and Free Will Baptist maintain regular meetings and Sunday services. There are a few local businesses on Cedar Island.

Cedar Island is about 4 miles (6.4 km) long, extending from the "Lola" village on the southeast end near Core Sound and Lewis Creek, north to the Ferry Station at the northern side of the island, bordering Pamlico Sound. The main village of Cedar Island, formerly known as "Roe" is located along the north central portion of the island. There is a fisherman's harbor in this area.

Cedar Island has sandy beaches adjacent to stands of juniper, cedar, and pine. More than half of Cedar Island belongs to the Cedar Island National Wildlife Refuge. The refuge is open for hiking and has a headquarters and information kiosk at the south end of the island, near the end of Lola Road. There are several boat ramps available for public use in Cedar Island.

== Climate ==
Cedar Island has a humid subtropical climate (Köppen Cfa). The climate is cooler than inland areas in the summer and warmer in the winter, and it is occasionally hit by hurricanes in the fall. Temperatures do not often fall below freezing 20 °F (−7 °C) in the winter, nor do they often rise above 95 °F (35 °C) in the summer.

Climate data for Cedar Island, North Carolina (1991–2020 normals, extremes 1955–present)
Month	Jan	Feb	Mar	Apr	May	Jun	Jul	Aug	Sep	Oct	Nov	Dec	Year
Record high °F (°C)	86 (30)	85 (29)	88 (31)	95 (35)	98 (37)	101 (38)	103 (39)	102 (39)	98 (37)	98 (37)	85 (29)	81 (27)	103 (39)
Mean maximum °F (°C)	73.8 (23.2)	74.6 (23.7)	80.3 (26.8)	86.0 (30.0)	91.4 (33.0)	96.1 (35.6)	97.9 (36.6)	95.8 (35.4)	91.3 (32.9)	86.4 (30.2)	79.6 (26.4)	74.0 (23.3)	98.6 (37.0)
Mean daily maximum °F (°C)	61.5 (16.4)	63.2 (17.3)	69.1 (20.6)	77.1 (25.1)	83.6 (28.7)	89.9 (32.2)	92.9 (33.8)	91.2 (32.9)	86.5 (30.3)	79.3 (26.3)	70.4 (21.3)	63.9 (17.7)	74.8 (23.8)
Daily mean °F (°C)	49.7 (9.8)	51.3 (10.7)	57.2 (14.0)	65.6 (18.7)	72.7 (22.6)	79.6 (26.4)	82.9 (28.3)	81.7 (27.6)	77.6 (25.3)	68.9 (20.5)	59.2 (15.1)	52.4 (11.3)	63.5 (17.5)
Mean daily minimum °F (°C)	37.9 (3.3)	39.3 (4.1)	45.4 (7.4)	54.1 (12.3)	61.8 (16.6)	69.3 (20.7)	72.8 (22.7)	72.1 (22.3)	68.7 (20.4)	58.5 (14.7)	48.0 (8.9)	41.0 (5.0)	52.1 (11.2)
Mean minimum °F (°C)	19.7 (−6.8)	23.3 (−4.8)	27.9 (−2.3)	37.5 (3.1)	46.3 (7.9)	56.2 (13.4)	62.3 (16.8)	61.2 (16.2)	56.4 (13.6)	40.9 (4.9)	30.4 (−0.9)	25.1 (−3.8)	18.4 (−7.6)
Record low °F (°C)	2 (−17)	12 (−11)	10 (−12)	28 (−2)	38 (3)	46 (8)	51 (11)	55 (13)	44 (7)	27 (−3)	18 (−8)	8 (−13)	2 (−17)
Average precipitation inches (mm)	4.59 (117)	3.67 (93)	3.94 (100)	3.63 (92)	4.32 (110)	4.37 (111)	6.70 (170)	7.98 (203)	7.12 (181)	4.45 (113)	4.12 (105)	4.56 (116)	59.45 (1,511)
Average snowfall inches (cm)	1.1 (2.8)	0.2 (0.51)	—	0.0 (0.0)	0.0 (0.0)	0.0 (0.0)	0.0 (0.0)	0.0 (0.0)	0.0 (0.0)	0.0 (0.0)	0.0 (0.0)	0.6 (1.5)	1.9 (4.8)
Average precipitation days (≥ 0.01 in)	10.7	9.6	10.2	8.4	9.3	10.8	12.7	12.7	11.3	7.8	9.2	10.7	123.4
Average snowy days (≥ 0.1 in)	0.5	0.3	0.0	0.0	0.0	0.0	0.0	0.0	0.0	0.0	0.0	0.2	1.0
Source: NOAA (snow 1981–2010)

Although infrequent due to North Carolina's latitude and cooler winters, alligators have been observed in the area. Cedar Island is near the northernmost reaches of the American alligator's native range.

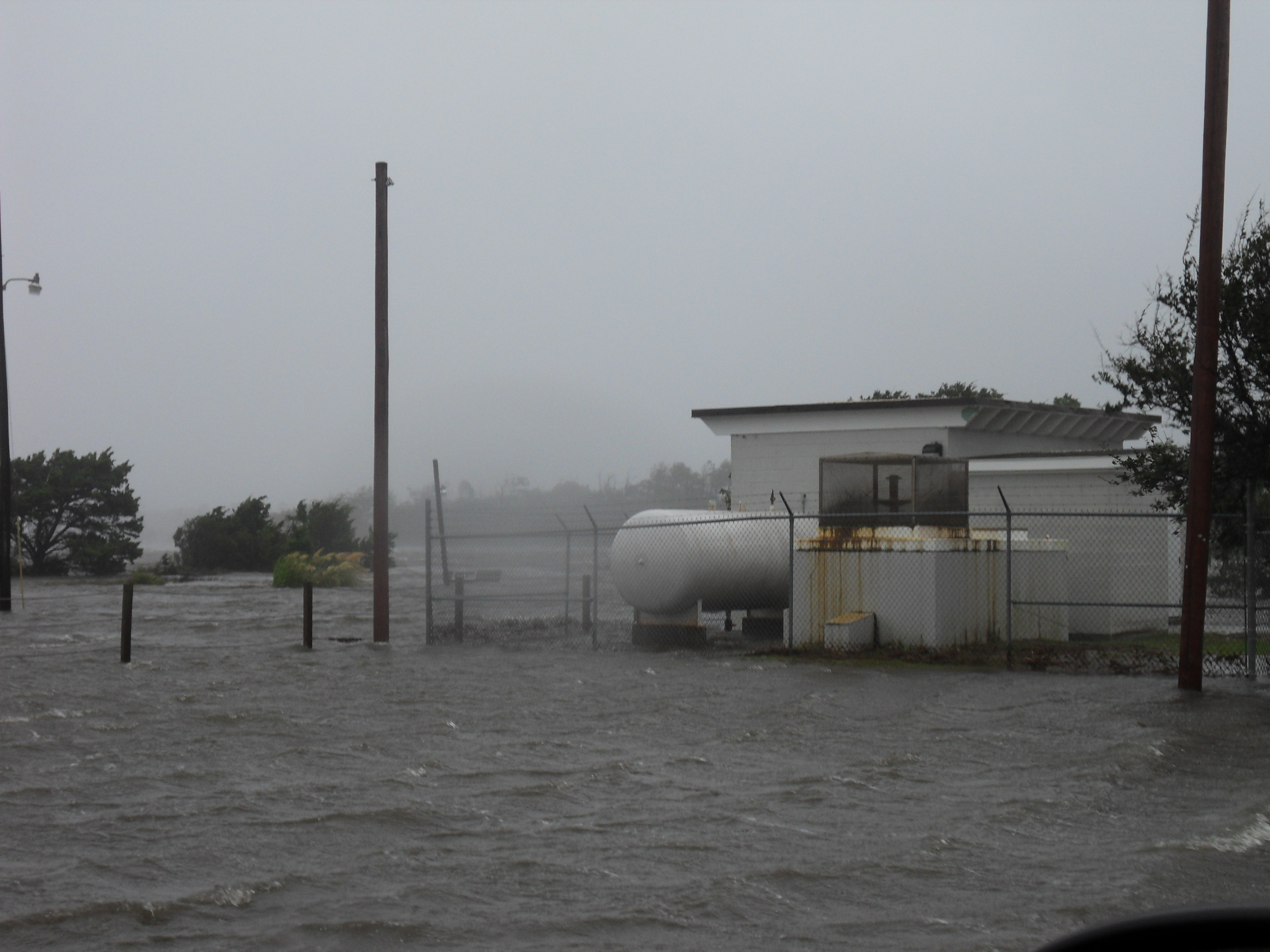
Cedar Island after Hurricane Irene, 2011

== Neighboring communities ==
- Atlantic - 10 miles (16 km) south
- Sea Level - 10 miles (16 km) southwest on NC-12
- Ocracoke - 23 miles (37 km) northeast across Pamlico Sound
- Portsmouth - 20 miles (32 km) east across Core Sound
- Beaufort - 35 miles (56 km) southwest on NC-12 & US-70
- Swan Quarter - north across Pamlico Sound
