= Down East (North Carolina) =

Region of coastal North Carolina

Coordinates: 34.85°N 76.53°W

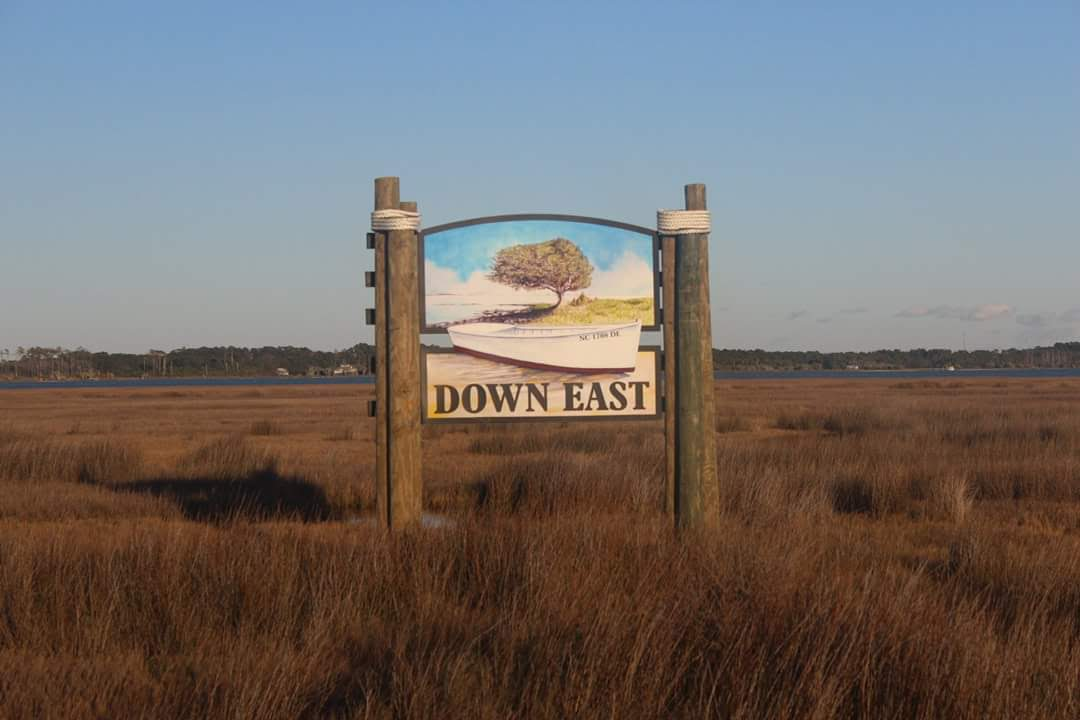
Welcome sign greeting drivers at the beginning of the Down East communities

In North Carolina, Down East refers to the historical group of coastal communities east of Beaufort in Carteret County.

== Carteret County ==
Down East historically refers to the group of communities east of Beaufort in Carteret County in the coastal plain region of the state. These communities are Bettie, Otway, Straits, Harkers Island, Gloucester, Marshallberg, Tusk, Smyrna, Williston, Davis, Stacy, Masontown, Sea Level, Atlantic and Cedar Island. Many residents of these communities feature a High Tider ("Hoi Toider") accent, a dialect remnant of Elizabethan English that was once spoken in colonial Carolina. This dialect is indigenous to the lowland areas of North Carolina, in combination with the general southern accent common in the Southeast. The area is a major fishing area, including shrimping and blue crabs.

== Eastern North Carolina ==
The term Down East has broadened in usage over the years to refer to Eastern North Carolina in general or more specifically the central coastal plain of the state, roughly where the Pamlico Sound watershed is between the Tar-Pamlico and Neuse river basins. Towns and cities in the watershed include but are not limited to Greenville, Goldsboro, Kinston, New Bern, Rocky Mount, Tarboro, Washington, and Wilson.

== Organizations and events ==
- Down East Bird Dawgs, an independent baseball team, Kinston
- Down East Wood Ducks, a defunct minor-league baseball team, Kinston
- WRQM, a public radio station formerly known as Down East Radio, North Carolina Wesleyan College
- Down East Holiday Show, Greenville
- Down East Partnership for Children, Rocky Mount
- Down East Music Festival, Rocky Mount
- Down East Viking Football Classic, Elizabeth City State University

== See also ==
- Down East, the name for part or all of coastal Maine
- Inner Banks, a name for the coastal region of North Carolina that is inland from the Outer Banks
