= Otway, North Carolina =

Unincorporated community in North Carolina, US

Coordinates: 34°46′33″N 76°33′29″W

Otway in an unincorporated community located in the Straits Township in Carteret County, North Carolina, United States. It is the hub of the Down East region of North Carolina, with a number of businesses including a general store, a hardware store, tire company, services stations, boat supplier, clinic, gym, and library. The community is located near Gillikin Road just west of the intersection of US 70 and Harkers Island Road.

The town is named for War of 1812 privateer and later North Carolina state senator Otway Burns.

== See also ==
- List of townships in North Carolina
