= Merrimon, North Carolina =

Unincorporated community in North Carolina, US

Coordinates: 34°56′58″N 76°38′22″W

Merrimon is an unincorporated community in Carteret County, North Carolina, United States. It is approximately 20 miles (32 km) away from Beaufort. It is home to the Jonaquins Landing and Sand Hills housing developments. The only access to the Merrimon area is via Merrimon Road.
