= Calico Bay =

Bay in North Carolina, United States

Coordinates: 34.7307168°N 76.7121541°W

Calico Bay is a bay in Carteret County, North Carolina, in the United States.

Calico Bay was named for its colorful bed thanks to abundant deposits of loam.
