= Ocean, North Carolina =

Unincorporated community in North Carolina, U.S.

Ocean
- Unincorporated community
- Location within the U.S. state of North Carolina
- Coordinates: 34.71°N 76.99°W
- Country: United States
- State: North Carolina
- County: Carteret
- Time zone: UTC-5 (EST)
  - Summer (DST): UTC-4 (EDT)
- ZIP Code: 28570
- Area code: 252

Ocean is an unincorporated community in Carteret County, North Carolina, United States.

== Geography ==
Ocean is located in southwestern Carteret County, west of Broad Creek.

NC 24 is the primary highway within the community.

The ZIP Code for Ocean is 28570.
