= Brandywine Bay, North Carolina =

- Census-designated place
- Location within North Carolina Location within the United States
- Coordinates: 34°44′18″N 76°49′49″W
- Country: United States
- State: North Carolina
- County: Carteret

Area
  - Total: 0.83 sq mi (2.14 km^{2})
  - Land: 0.81 sq mi (2.09 km^{2})
  - Water: 0.019 sq mi (0.05 km^{2})
- Elevation: 20 ft (6.1 m)

Population (2020)
  - Total: 1,153
  - Density: 1,431/sq mi (552.5/km^{2})
- Time zone: UTC-5 (Eastern (EST))
  - Summer (DST): UTC-4 (EDT)
- ZIP Code: 28557 (Morehead City)
- Area code: 252
- FIPS code: 37-07588
- GNIS feature ID: 2812780

Brandywine Bay is a planned community and census-designated place (CDP) in Carteret County, North Carolina, United States. It was first listed as a CDP in the 2020 census with a population of 1,153.

The community is in west-central Carteret County, bordered to the east by Morehead City. U.S. Route 70 forms the northern edge of the CDP, and North Carolina Highway 24 forms the southern edge. The two highway lead east into Morehead City; in the other direction, US-70 leads northwest 31 miles (50 km) to New Bern, while NC-24 leads west 14 miles (23 km) to Cape Carteret.

== Demographics ==
Historical population
Census	Pop.	Note	%±
2020	1,153		—
U.S. Decennial Census; 2020

=== 2020 census ===
Brandywine Bay CDP, North Carolina – Demographic Profile (NH = Non-Hispanic)
Race / Ethnicity	Pop 2020	% 2020
White alone (NH)	1,081	93.76%
Black or African American alone (NH)	6	0.52%
Native American or Alaska Native alone (NH)	2	0.17%
Asian alone (NH)	14	1.21%
Pacific Islander alone (NH)	0	0.00%
Some Other Race alone (NH)	1	0.09%
Mixed Race/Multi-Racial (NH)	25	2.17%
Hispanic or Latino (any race)	24	2.08%
Total	1,153	100.00%

Note: the US Census treats Hispanic/Latino as an ethnic category. This table excludes Latinos from the racial categories and assigns them to a separate category. Hispanics/Latinos can be of any race.
