= Core Creek, Carteret County, North Carolina =

Core Creek
- Unincorporated community
- Location within the state of North Carolina Core Creek (North Carolina)
- Coordinates: 34°49′43″N 76°41′35″W
- Country: United States
- State: North Carolina
- County: Carteret
- Elevation: 3 ft (0.91 m)
- Time zone: UTC-5 (Eastern (EST))
  - Summer (DST): UTC-4 (EDT)
- GNIS feature ID: 1019784

Core Creek is a populated place in Carteret County, North Carolina, United States.
