= Core Sound =

Sound in North Carolina, U.S.

Coordinates: 34°51′08″N 76°20′54″W

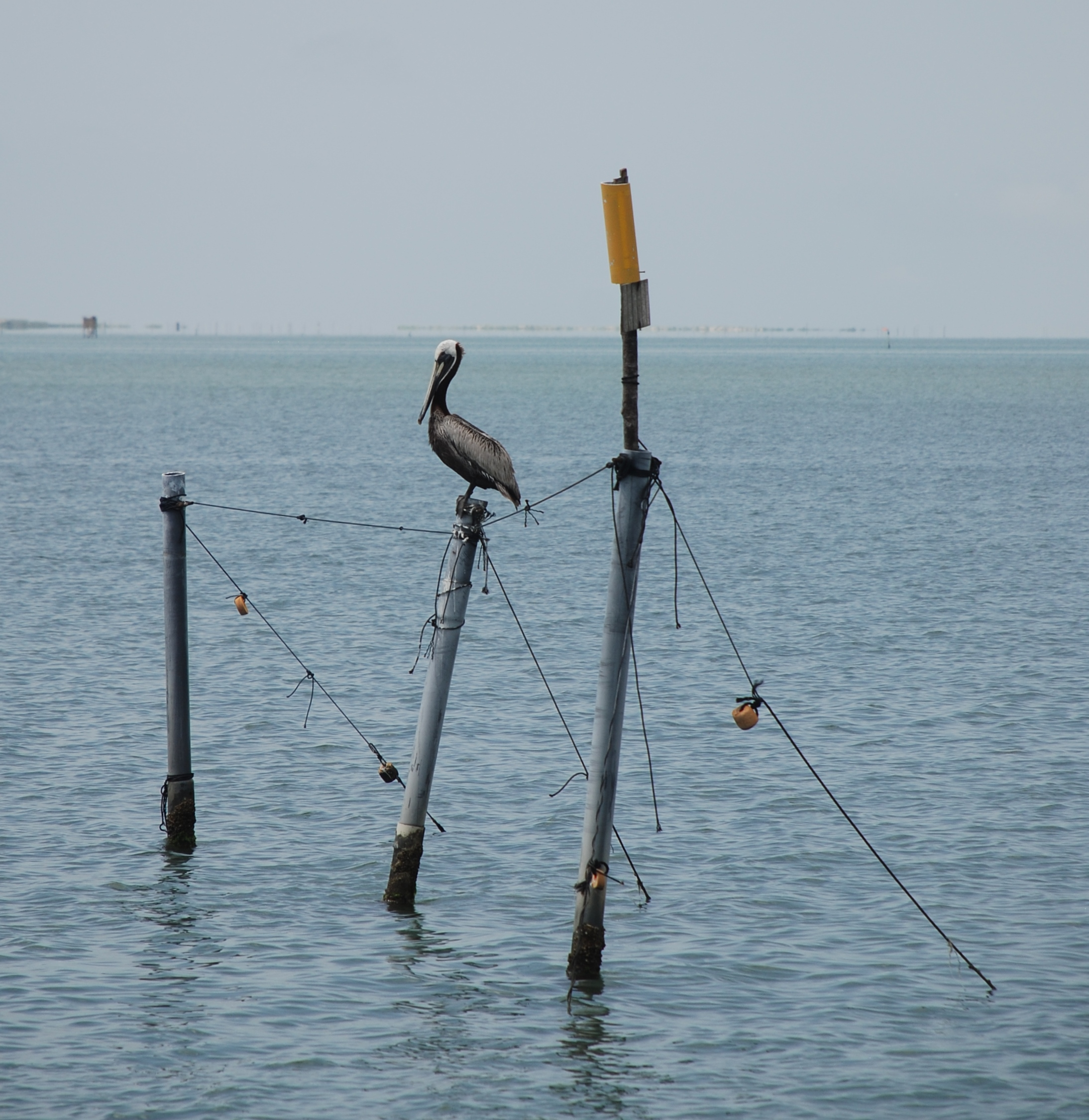
- Core Sound in 2014
- Interactive map of Core Sound
- Location: Carteret County, North Carolina, U.S.

The Core Sound is a sound in eastern North Carolina located between the mainland of Carteret County and Core Banks, part of the Outer Banks of North Carolina. It lies between the large Pamlico Sound to the northeast and the smaller Back Sound to the west. Several shifting inlets connect the sound to the Atlantic Ocean.

Settlements on the mainland side of the sound include Marshallberg, Davis, Sea Level, and Atlantic. There are no permanent settlements on Core Banks. There are cabins that are available to rent. A ferry service out of Davis carries day visitors and campers across the sound to the islands.
