= Davis, North Carolina =

- Census-designated place
- Location within North Carolina
- Coordinates: 34°47′51″N 76°27′37″W
- Country: United States
- State: North Carolina
- County: Carteret

Area
  - Total: 2.20 sq mi (5.69 km^{2})
  - Land: 2.18 sq mi (5.65 km^{2})
  - Water: 0.015 sq mi (0.04 km^{2})
- Elevation: 3 ft (0.91 m)

Population (2020)
  - Total: 311
  - Density: 142.6/sq mi (55.04/km^{2})
- Time zone: UTC-5 (Eastern (EST))
  - Summer (DST): UTC-4 (EDT)
- ZIP code: 28524
- Area code: 252
- FIPS code: 37-16480
- GNIS feature ID: 0983982

Davis is an unincorporated area and census-designated place (CDP) in Carteret County, North Carolina, United States. At the 2020 census, it had a population of 311, down from 422 at the 2010 census.

== Geography ==
Davis is located in eastern Carteret County, on the northwest shore of Core Sound, between Jarrett Bay to the west and Oyster Creek to the northeast. To the southeast, across Core Sound, is Core Banks, a barrier island that is part of Cape Lookout National Seashore, with access by ferry from Davis. U.S. Route 70 passes through the town, leading southwest 18 miles (29 km) to Beaufort and northeast 13 miles (21 km) to its eastern terminus at Atlantic.

The Davis CDP has a total area of 2.2 square miles (5.7 km^{2}), of which 0.01 square miles (0.03 km^{2}), or 0.59%, is water.

== Demographics ==
Historical population
Census	Pop.	Note	%±
2020	311		—
U.S. Decennial Census
