= Carteret County, North Carolina =

County in North Carolina, United States

- County
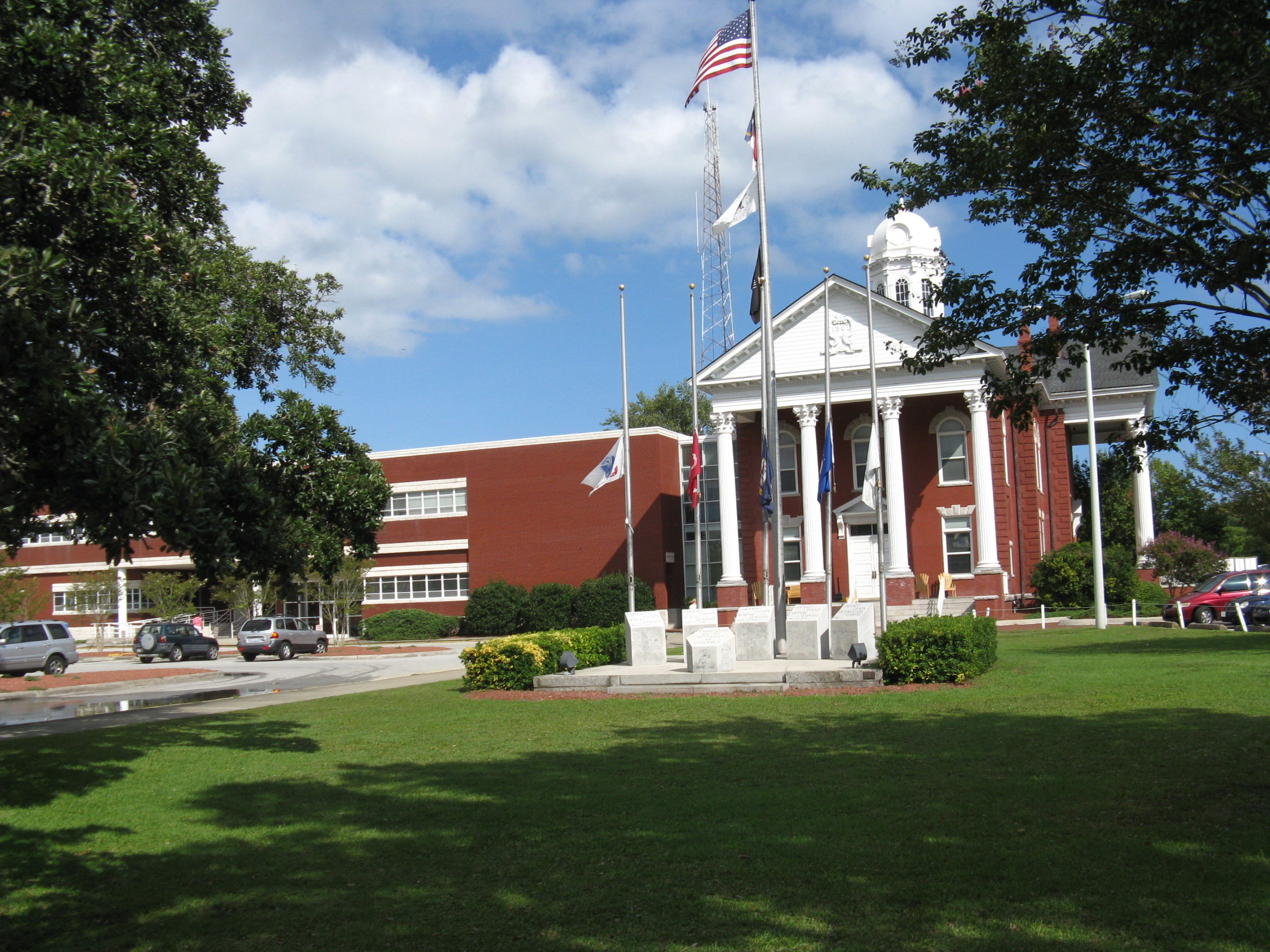
- Carteret County Courthouse

- Flag Seal

- Location within the U.S. state of North Carolina
- Interactive map of Carteret County, North Carolina
- Coordinates: 34.86°N 76.54°W
- Country: United States
- State: North Carolina
- Founded: 1722
- Named for: Sir George Carteret
- Seat: Beaufort
- Largest community: Morehead City

Government
  - County Manager: Sharon Griffin

Area
  - Total: 1,330.41 sq mi (3,445.7 km^{2})
  - Land: 507.60 sq mi (1,314.7 km^{2})
  - Water: 822.81 sq mi (2,131.1 km^{2}) 61.85%

Population (2020)
  - Total: 67,686
  - Estimate (2025): 70,469 ▲
  - Density: 133.35/sq mi (51.49/km^{2})
- Time zone: UTC−5 (Eastern)
  - Summer (DST): UTC−4 (EDT)
- Congressional district: 3rd
- Website: www.carteretcountync.gov

Carteret County (/ˌkɑːr.təˈrɛt/ KAR-tuh-RET or /ˌkɑːr.tɜːrˈɛt/ KAR-tur-ET) is a county located in the U.S. state of North Carolina. As of the 2020 census, the population was 67,686. Its county seat is Beaufort. The county was created in 1722 as Carteret Precinct and gained county status in 1739. It was named for Sir George Carteret, one of the 17th century English Lords Proprietor, or for his descendant and heir John Carteret, 2nd Earl Granville.

Carteret County comprises the Morehead City, NC Micropolitan Statistical Area, which is also included in the New Bern-Morehead City, NC Combined Statistical Area. Most of the county is part of the Crystal Coast.

== History ==
The first male of English parents born in the current area of North Carolina was John Fulford. He was born in 1629 in what is now Carteret County. He settled in this area and died in 1729. An article dated September 18, 1893, in The New Bern Daily Journal, identified Fulford's grave in a cemetery outside the county seat of Beaufort, in an area called the Straits. It was described as "bricked up with English brick." In 1971 a survey by the Carteret County Historical Society found such a grave in the Fulford Cemetery off Piper Lane in Gloucester. The unmarked, bricked-up grave matching this description survives today.

One of the more prominent families from Carteret County was the Dennis family. William Dennis Sr. (b.1720 - d.1800) was an extremely colorful landowner, Revolutionary War officer, and defender of the county. In 1747, he assisted with the successful defense of the county during the War of Jenkins' Ear (fighting against Spanish pirates). During the Revolutionary War he served as a 2nd Major in the Carteret County Regiment of the North Carolina militia. In 1782, he fought alongside Lieutenant Colonel John Easton to drive the British from Carteret County. Dennis once owned the Hammock House, which became well known as the house owned by the pirate Blackbeard. His son, William Dennis Junior was a captain in the 8th North Carolina Regiment (1777-1778), was present at Valley Forge and also fought in the Carteret County Regiment (1781-1782). In the 1790 U.S. census, Dennis was one of the largest land owners in the county. Branches of the Dennis family include the Bells, Watsons and Pelletiers, many of whom continued to live in the area for many years. In a typical pattern of following the availability of new lands in the Deep South, some branches of this family later migrated to Mississippi and Texas in the 19th century.

In 2024, real estate developers in Cedar Point disturbed the site of an ancient Native American settlement. The discovery led to controversy over the continuance of the housing development and calls for new regulations to protect historical sites. Several state lawmakers pushed for construction to resume, with one legislator receiving campaign contributions from the project's developers in 2022.

== Geography ==
According to the U.S. Census Bureau, the county has a total area of 1,330.41 square miles (3,445.7 km^{2}), of which 507.60 square miles (1,314.7 km^{2}) is land and 822.81 square miles (2,131.1 km^{2}) (61.85%) is water. It is the third-largest county in North Carolina by total area.

=== National protected areas/sites ===
- Cape Lookout Lighthouse
- Cape Lookout National Seashore
- Cedar Island National Wildlife Refuge
- Croatan National Forest (part)
- Pocosin Wilderness (part)

=== State and local protected areas/sites ===
- Carteret County Game Land
- Croatan Game Land (part)
- Fort Macon State Park
- North Carolina Aquarium at Pine Knoll Shores
- North Carolina Maritime Museum at Beaufort
- Rachel Carson Reserve
- Theodore Roosevelt State Natural Area

Outstanding water sources and protected areas:

- Back Bay Mechanical Harvesting of Oysters Prohibited Area
- Back Sound Mechanical Harvesting of Oysters Prohibited Area
- Back Sound Outstanding Resource Water
- Bardens Inlet Crab Spawning Sanctuary
- Bear Island Area Outstanding Resource Water (part)
- Bogue Sound Mechanical Harvesting of Oysters Prohibited Area
- Bogue Sound Outstanding Resource Water
- Core Sound, Neuse River Basin Outstanding Resource Water
- Core Sound, White Oak River Basin Outstanding Resource Water
- Drum Inlet Crab Spawning Sanctuary
- Neuse-Southeast Pamlico Sound Area Outstanding Resource Water (part)
- Newport River Mechanical Harvesting of Oysters Prohibited Area
- North Bay Mechanical Harvesting of Oysters Prohibited Area
- North River Mechanical Harvesting of Oysters Prohibited Area
- Ocracoke Inlet Crab Spawning Sanctuary (part)
- Rachel Carson Estuarine Reserve Dedicated Nature Preserve
- The Straits Mechanical Harvesting of Oysters Prohibited Area
- White Oak River Mechanical Harvesting of Oysters Prohibited Area (part)

=== Major water bodies ===
- Adams Creek
- Atlantic Ocean (North Atlantic Ocean)
- Back Sound
- Barden Inlet
- Barry Bay
- Beaufort Inlet
- Bogue Sound
- Calico Bay
- Core Sound
- Drum Inlet
- Harlowe Creek
- Intracoastal Waterway
- Jarrett Bay
- Long Bay
- Nelson Bay
- Newport River
- Neuse River
- North River
- Ocracoke Inlet
- Onslow Bay
- Pamlico Sound
- Raleigh Bay
- South River
- Taylor's Creek
- Thorofare Bay
- Turnagain Bay
- West Bay
- West Thorofare Bay
- White Oak River

=== Adjacent counties ===
- Jones County – north
- Craven County – north
- Pamlico County – north
- Hyde County – northeast
- Onslow County – west

=== Major highways ===
- Future I-42
- US 70
- NC 12
- NC 24
- NC 58
- NC 101

=== Major infrastructure ===
- Amtrak Thruway (Morehead City)
- Carteret County Speedway
- Cedar Island–Ocracoke Ferry (to Hyde County)
- Michael J. Smith Field
- Ferries to the uninhabited islands in Cape Lookout National Seashore
- Port of Morehead City

== Demographics ==
Historical population
Census	Pop.	Note	%±
1790	3,734		—
1800	4,399		17.8%
1810	4,823		9.6%
1820	5,609		16.3%
1830	6,597		17.6%
1840	6,591		−0.1%
1850	6,939		5.3%
1860	8,186		18.0%
1870	9,010		10.1%
1880	9,784		8.6%
1890	10,825		10.6%
1900	11,811		9.1%
1910	13,776		16.6%
1920	15,384		11.7%
1930	16,900		9.9%
1940	18,284		8.2%
1950	23,059		26.1%
1960	30,940		34.2%
1970	31,603		2.1%
1980	41,092		30.0%
1990	52,556		27.9%
2000	59,383		13.0%
2010	66,469		11.9%
2020	67,686		1.8%
2025 (est.)	70,469	▲	4.1%
U.S. Decennial Census; 1790–1960 1900–1990; 1990–2000 2010 2020

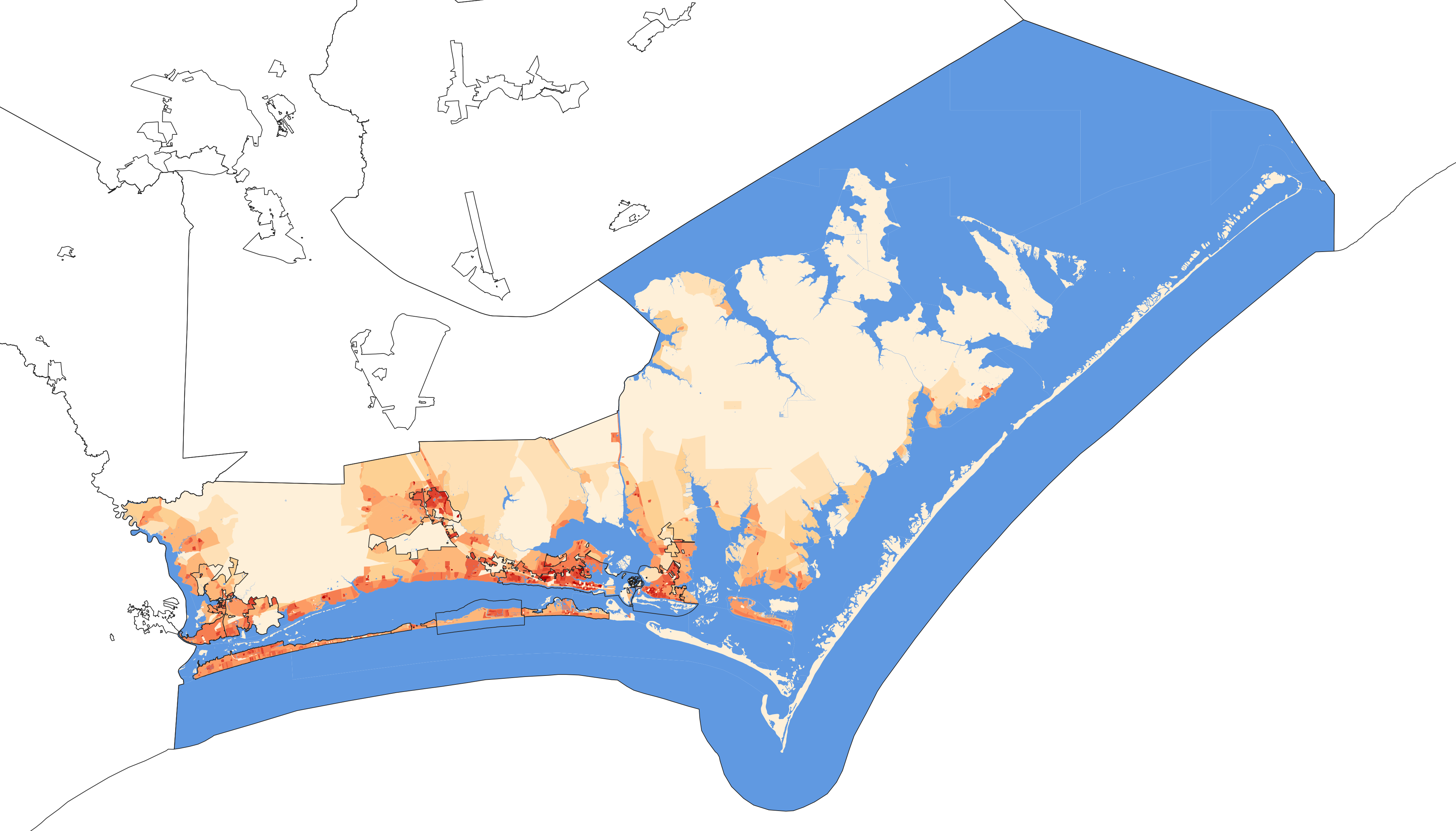
2020 population density of Carteret County NC by census block

=== Racial and ethnic composition ===
Carteret County, North Carolina – Racial and ethnic composition Note: the US Census treats Hispanic/Latino as an ethnic category. This table excludes Latinos from the racial categories and assigns them to a separate category. Hispanics/Latinos may be of any race.
Race / Ethnicity (NH = Non-Hispanic)	Pop 1980	Pop 1990	Pop 2000	Pop 2010	Pop 2020	% 1980	% 1990	% 2000	% 2010	% 2020
White alone (NH)	36,673	47,188	53,041	58,101	57,538	89.25%	89.79%	89.32%	87.41%	85.01%
Black or African American alone (NH)	3,826	4,369	4,121	3,986	3,208	9.31%	8.31%	6.94%	6.00%	4.74%
Native American or Alaska Native alone (NH)	125	264	251	283	252	0.30%	0.50%	0.42%	0.43%	0.37%
Asian alone (NH)	142	273	307	576	584	0.35%	0.52%	0.52%	0.87%	0.86%
Native Hawaiian or Pacific Islander alone (NH)	x	x	33	63	63	x	x	0.06%	0.09%	0.09%
Other race alone (NH)	29	12	37	97	252	0.07%	0.02%	0.06%	0.15%	0.37%
Mixed race or Multiracial (NH)	x	x	558	1,122	2,670	x	x	0.94%	1.69%	3.94%
Hispanic or Latino (any race)	297	450	1,035	2,241	3,119	0.72%	0.86%	1.74%	3.37%	4.61%
Total	41,092	52,556	59,383	66,469	67,686	100.00%	100.00%	100.00%	100.00%	100.00%

=== 2020 census ===
As of the 2020 census, the county had 67,686 people, 30,112 households, and 18,292 families residing within it. The median age was 50.6 years, with 17.0% of residents under the age of 18 and 26.4% aged 65 or older. For every 100 females there were 95.8 males, and for every 100 females age 18 and over there were 93.8 males age 18 and over.

The racial makeup of the county was 86.1% White, 4.8% Black or African American, 0.5% American Indian and Alaska Native, 0.9% Asian, 0.1% Native Hawaiian and Pacific Islander, 2.1% from some other race, and 5.6% from two or more races. Hispanic or Latino residents of any race comprised 4.6% of the population.

69.4% of residents lived in urban areas, while 30.6% lived in rural areas.

Of the county's 30,112 households, 22.3% had children under the age of 18 living in them. Married-couple households comprised 49.6% of all households, 18.0% were households with a male householder and no spouse or partner present, and 26.2% were households with a female householder and no spouse or partner present. About 30.5% of all households were made up of individuals and 15.2% had someone living alone who was 65 years of age or older.

There were 50,846 housing units, of which 40.8% were vacant. Among occupied housing units, 73.9% were owner-occupied and 26.1% were renter-occupied. The homeowner vacancy rate was 2.5% and the rental vacancy rate was 9.3%.

=== 2000 census ===
At the 2000 census, there were 59,383 people, 25,204 households, and 17,365 families residing in the county. The population density was 114 people per square mile (44 people/km^{2}). There were 40,947 housing units at an average density of 79 units per square mile (31 units/km^{2}). The racial makeup of the county was 90.28% White, 6.99% Black or African American, 0.54% Asian, 0.43% Native American, 0.06% Pacific Islander, 0.60% from other races, and 1.09% from two or more races. 1.74% of the population were Hispanic or Latino of any race.

There were 25,204 households, out of which 26.50% had children under the age of 18 living with them, 56.00% were married couples living together, 9.60% had a female householder with no husband present, and 31.10% were non-families. 26.10% of all households were made up of individuals, and 10.10% had someone living alone who was 65 years of age or older. The average household size was 2.31 and the average family size was 2.76.

In the county, the population was spread out, with 20.70% under the age of 18, 6.40% from 18 to 24, 27.20% from 25 to 44, 28.40% from 45 to 64, and 17.20% who were 65 years of age or older. The median age was 42 years. For every 100 females there were 96 males. For every 100 females age 18 and over, there were 94 males.

The median income for a household in Carteret County in 2009 was $49,711, and the median income for a family was $45,499. Males had a median income of $31,365 versus $22,126 for females. The per capita income for the county was $21,260. About 8.00% of families and 10.70% of the population were below the poverty line, including 15.40% of those under age 18 and 9.40% of those age 65 or over.

== Government and politics ==
Carteret County is a member of the regional Eastern Carolina Council of Governments. It includes 16 of North Carolina's townships.

Carteret County operates under a council–manager form of government. The county manager is Sharon Griffin.

A voting machine malfunction in the county resulted in the loss of 4,438 ballots cast during early voting for the November 2, 2004, general election. Since the number of lost ballots exceeded the lead held (by Steve Troxler over Britt Cobb) in the statewide race for agriculture commissioner, the State Board of Elections decided to hold a special election on January 11, 2005, open only to the 18,500 voters in the county who either failed to vote or whose votes were lost. Both candidates filed legal challenges contesting the format of the new election. On February 4, 2005, Cobb conceded the race.

United States presidential election results for Carteret County, North Carolina
Year	Republican		Democratic		Third party(ies)	
Year	No.	%	No.	%	No.	%
1912	218	11.43%	1,153	60.43%	537	28.14%
1916	1,246	51.68%	1,165	48.32%	0	0.00%
1920	2,315	52.79%	2,070	47.21%	0	0.00%
1924	1,854	44.89%	2,261	54.75%	15	0.36%
1928	3,133	60.51%	2,045	39.49%	0	0.00%
1932	1,765	33.46%	3,455	65.50%	55	1.04%
1936	1,889	33.32%	3,780	66.68%	0	0.00%
1940	1,789	31.47%	3,896	68.53%	0	0.00%
1944	1,566	30.98%	3,489	69.02%	0	0.00%
1948	1,520	29.46%	3,491	67.66%	149	2.89%
1952	2,967	40.94%	4,280	59.06%	0	0.00%
1956	3,804	49.54%	3,875	50.46%	0	0.00%
1960	4,493	46.05%	5,264	53.95%	0	0.00%
1964	4,289	40.77%	6,231	59.23%	0	0.00%
1968	4,593	40.23%	3,762	32.95%	3,061	26.81%
1972	8,463	74.14%	2,805	24.57%	147	1.29%
1976	5,786	44.72%	7,080	54.72%	73	0.56%
1980	7,733	52.37%	6,485	43.92%	549	3.72%
1984	11,637	66.28%	5,882	33.50%	38	0.22%
1988	11,076	61.55%	6,859	38.12%	59	0.33%
1992	10,334	47.36%	8,028	36.79%	3,457	15.84%
1996	11,721	56.15%	7,566	36.24%	1,589	7.61%
2000	17,381	65.69%	8,839	33.40%	241	0.91%
2004	17,716	69.27%	7,732	30.23%	127	0.50%
2008	23,131	66.86%	11,130	32.17%	336	0.97%
2012	24,775	69.76%	10,301	29.00%	441	1.24%
2016	26,569	70.32%	9,939	26.31%	1,273	3.37%
2020	30,028	70.33%	12,093	28.32%	574	1.34%
2024	32,508	70.95%	12,813	27.97%	496	1.08%

== Education ==
=== Primary and secondary education ===
The county is served by the Carteret County Public Schools. Carteret County Public Schools has 16 schools ranging from pre-kindergarten to twelfth grade. Those 16 schools are separated into three high schools, four middle schools, and nine elementary schools.

In addition the county is home to a public charter school and three private schools:

- Tiller School is a grade K-5 public charter school in Beaufort
- Saint Egbert School is a grade K-5 Catholic school in Morehead City
- Grace Christian School is a grade K-8 school in Newport
- Gramercy Christian School is a grade K-12 school in Newport

=== Higher learning ===
- Carteret Community College (CCC)
- UNC-Chapel Hill Institute of Marine Sciences (UNC-IMS)
- NCSU Center for Marine Sciences and Technology (CMAST)
- Duke University Marine Laboratory

== Media ==
The Carteret County News-Times is a community newspaper based in Morehead City that serves Carteret County and nearby areas. Its predecessors were The Beaufort News, a newspaper founded in 1912, and the Twin City Daily Times, a newspaper founded in 1936. The Phillips family purchased and merged the two newspapers together to form Carteret County News-Times. The Carteret County News-Times's earliest printing was on May 18, 1948. Beginning in 1981, the newspaper has published three editions a week: Wednesday, Friday, and Sunday. According to the 2010 book North Carolina's Central Coast and New Bern, the newspaper is "a good source of information for vacationers who want to know the schedules of tours, festivals, kids' programs, seminars, exhibits and events of all types within the county and the surrounding area".

== Military ==
Marine Corps Auxiliary Landing Field Bogue is located in the western section of Carteret County along Bogue Sound. It comprises an 875 acres (3.54 km^{2}) landing field located on Bogue Sound that serves as the Marine Corps’ only East Coast site for Field Carrier Landing Practice (FCLP).

Marine Corps Outlying Field Atlantic is a training field in Atlantic. The USMC manages the Navy's Dumpling Creek Transmission Station in Merrimon. BT-11 Piney Island in Davis and Cat Island in Bogue Sound are former Marine Corps bombing ranges.

The Marine Corps also has a facility in Beaufort, at the southern tip of Radio Island (between the NC State Port in Morehead City, and the marine science laboratories on Pivers Island in Beaufort). It is military property, but is only staffed during military port operations.

The US Navy has a Port Control Office and the US Army has a Reserve Center, both in the eastern part of Morehead City. The NC National Guard has an Armory in Morehead City.

The US Coast Guard operates a Sector Office at Fort Macon, as well as a USCG Station at Emerald Isle and Morehead City.

== Communities ==
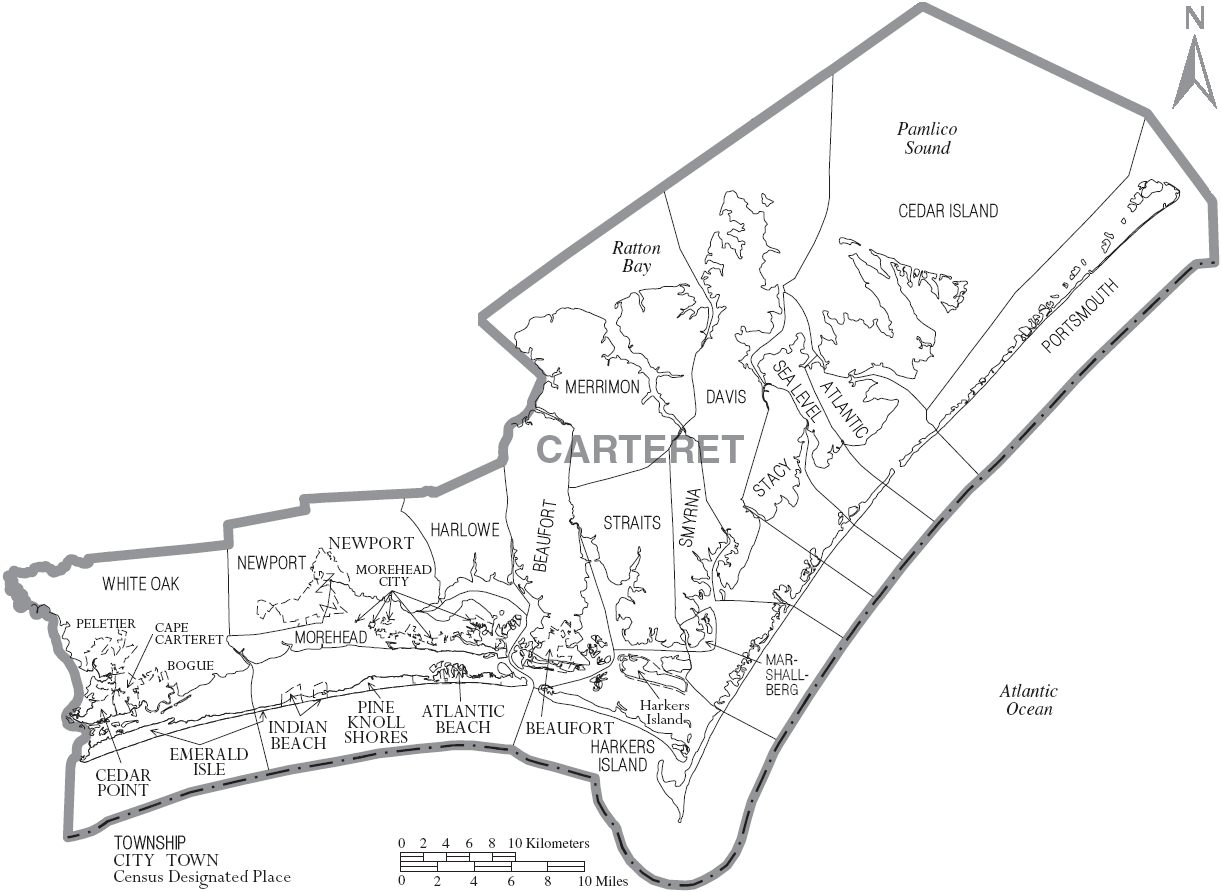
Map of Carteret County with municipal and township labels

=== Cities ===
- Morehead City (largest community)

=== Towns ===
- Atlantic Beach
- Beaufort (county seat)
- Bogue
- Cape Carteret
- Cedar Point
- Emerald Isle
- Indian Beach
- Newport
- Peletier
- Pine Knoll Shores

=== Townships ===
- Atlantic
- Beaufort
- Cedar Island
- Davis
- Harkers Island
- Harlowe
- Marshallberg
- Merrimon
- Morehead
- Newport
- Portsmouth
- Sea Level
- Smyrna
- Stacy
- Straits
- White Oak

=== Census-designated places ===
- Atlantic
- Brandywine Bay
- Broad Creek
- Davis
- Gloucester
- Harkers Island
- Marshallberg

=== Unincorporated communities ===
- Bettie
- Cape Lookout
- Cedar Island
- Core Creek
- Gales Creek
- Harlowe
- Lola
- Merrimon
- Mill Creek
- North River
- Ocean
- Otway
- Salter Path
- Sea Gate
- Sea Level
- Smyrna
- South River
- Stacy
- Stella
- Straits
- Wildwood
- Williston
- Wiregrass

== See also ==
- List of counties in North Carolina
- National Register of Historic Places listings in Carteret County, North Carolina
