= Atlantic, North Carolina =

- Census-designated place
- Welcome to Atlantic, Living by the Sea

- Location within North Carolina
- Coordinates: 34°52′35″N 76°19′09″W
- Country: United States
- State: North Carolina
- County: Carteret
- Settled: 1740
- Incorporated: 1905 (inactive)
- Named after: Atlantic Ocean

Area
  - Total: 0.94 sq mi (2.43 km^{2})
  - Land: 0.92 sq mi (2.38 km^{2})
  - Water: 0.019 sq mi (0.05 km^{2})
- Elevation: 0 ft (0 m)

Population (2020)
  - Total: 468
  - Density: 508.8/sq mi (196.46/km^{2})
- Time zone: UTC-5 (Eastern (EST))
  - Summer (DST): UTC-4 (EDT)
- ZIP code: 28511
- Area code: 252
- FIPS code: 37-02480
- GNIS feature ID: 1026498

Atlantic is an unincorporated community and census-designated place in eastern Carteret County, North Carolina, United States. As of the 2020 census, Atlantic had a population of 468. It is situated along Core Sound, located in what was known to early settlers of the area as Hunting Quarters. It is the location of the eastern terminus of US-70, and the ferry terminal for access to North Core Banks in the Cape Lookout National Seashore.

The community is located east of the United States Marine Corps installation MCOLF Atlantic which is primarily used for helicopter and aggressor force exercises. The installation sees limited use but is staffed around the clock by a security unit from MCAS Cherry Point.

Atlantic is home to Luther L. Smith and Son Seafood, the last operating fish house in the town. Drum Inlet Marina, the most suitable location to embark to the Outer Banks, is a full-service harbor. Commercial fishing has long been the primary means of earning a living in this community.

Atlantic was the site of the first public high school in Carteret County. It was an incorporated community from 1905 until 1920. It had three different mayors during this time.

== Geography ==
The Atlantic CDP has a total area of 0.93 square miles (2.4 km^{2}), of which 0.02 square miles (0.05 km^{2}), or 2.00%, is water. Little Port Brook separates two roads (Old US 70) from the other side, so it results in a dead end coming from both directions. Many believe that there used to be an old bridge where the harbor is today, since the road aligns, but it was taken out when the marina was put in. Now, US 70 ends before the separation, at the corner of Morris Dr and Seashore Dr, about 2500 feet away from the harbor.

By the Core Sound Loop Rd, near the White Point Take Out (on the other side), there is also a dead end sign facing south towards the harbor as well.

== Demographics ==
Historical population
Census	Pop.	Note	%±
2020	468		—
U.S. Decennial Census

== Sources ==
- Abandoned & Little-Known Airfields in SE NC (Since World War II MCOLF Atlantic has been a satellite airfield of Marine Corps Air Station Cherry Point, North Carolina. Though it is not in daily use anymore, it is used on a regular basis for training operations by the Marine Corps and other Military organizations.)
