= 1899 San Ciriaco hurricane =

Category 4 Atlantic hurricane

San Ciríaco Hurricane of 1899 1899 Puerto Rico Hurricane The Great Bahamas Hurricane of 1899
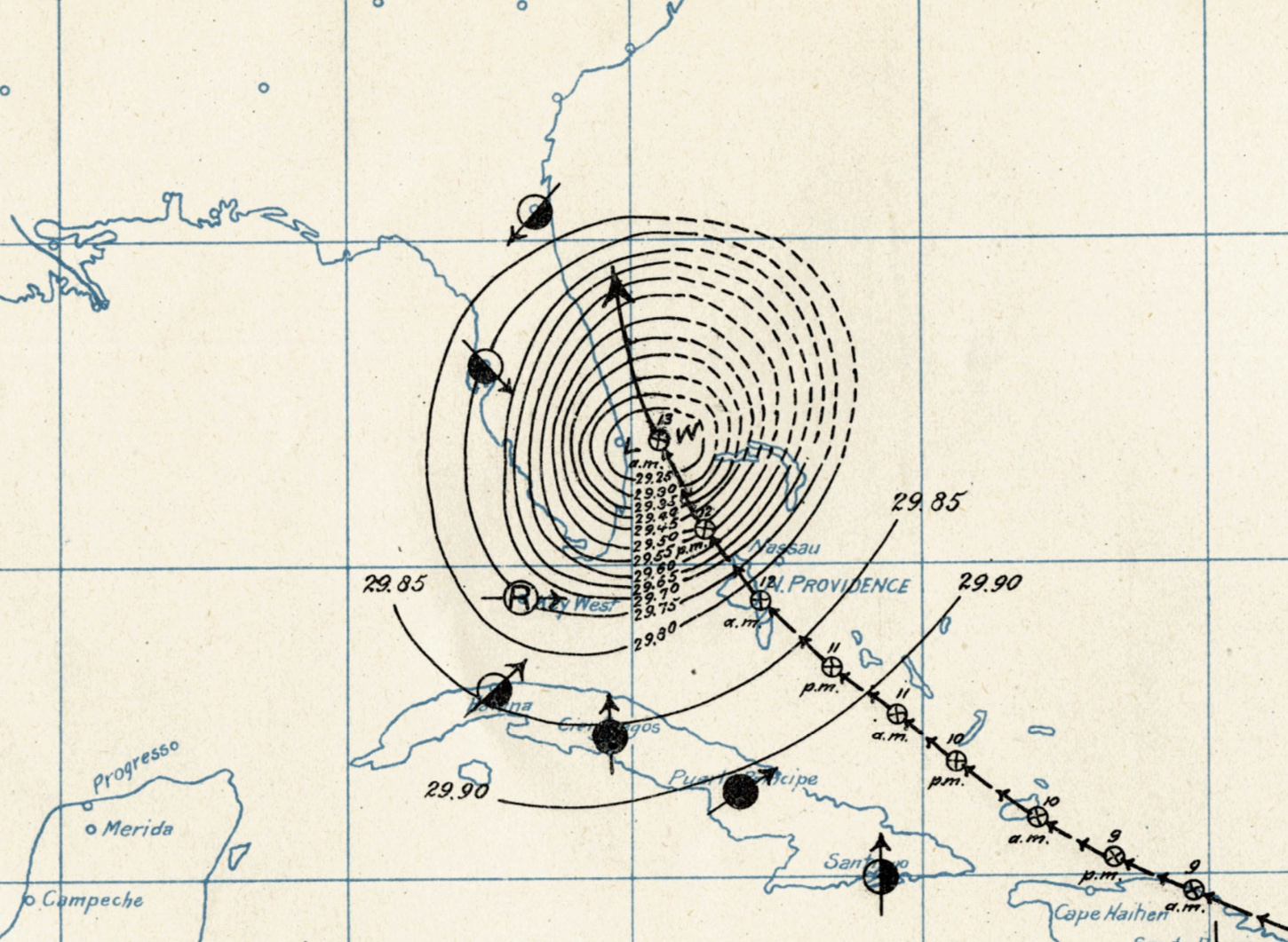
- Surface weather analysis showing the hurricane passing to the east of Florida on August 13

Meteorological history
- Formed: August 3, 1899
- Extratropical: September 4, 1899
- Dissipated: September 12, 1899
- Duration: 4 weeks

Category 4 major hurricane
- 1-minute sustained (SSHWS/NWS)
- Highest winds: 150 mph (240 km/h)
- Lowest pressure: 930 mbar (hPa); 27.46 inHg

Overall effects
- Fatalities: 3,855 direct
- Damage: $20 million (1899 USD)
- Areas affected: Leeward Islands, Puerto Rico, Hispaniola, Turks and Caicos Islands, Cuba, Bahamas, East Coast of the United States (Landfall in North Carolina), Atlantic Canada, Azores
- IBTrACS
- Part of the 1899 Atlantic hurricane season

The 1899 San Ciríaco hurricane, also known as the 1899 Puerto Rico Hurricane or The Great Bahamas Hurricane of 1899, was the longest-lived Atlantic hurricane on record, and the third-longest-lived tropical cyclone globally on record (in terms of tropical duration) after 1994's Hurricane John in the Pacific Ocean and 2023's Cyclone Freddy in the southern Indian Ocean. It was also one of the deadliest Atlantic hurricanes in recorded history, with an estimated 3,800 fatalities. The third tropical cyclone and first major hurricane of the season, this storm was first observed southwest of Cape Verde on August 3. It slowly strengthened while heading steadily west-northwestward across the Atlantic Ocean and reached hurricane status by late on August 5. During the following 48 hours, the Cape Verde hurricane deepened further, reaching Category 4 on the modern day Saffir–Simpson hurricane wind scale (SSHWS) before crossing the Leeward Islands on August 7. Later that day, the storm peaked with winds of 150 mph (240 km/h). The storm weakened slightly before making landfall in Guayama, Puerto Rico with winds of 140 mph (220 km/h) on August 8. Several hours later, it emerged into the southwestern Atlantic as a Category 3 hurricane. The system paralleled the north coast of Dominican Republic and then crossed the Bahamas, striking several islands. Then, on August 14, it started to move north while still being located east of Florida. The storm recurved northeastward early the next morning and appeared to be moving out to sea. However, by August 17, it turned back to the northwest and made landfall near Hatteras, North Carolina early on the following day. No stronger hurricane has made landfall on the Outer Banks since the San Ciriaco hurricane.

The storm weakened after moving inland and fell to Category 1 intensity by 1200 UTC on August 18. Later that day, the storm re-emerged into the Atlantic. Now heading northeastward, it continued weakening, but maintained Category 1 intensity. By late on August 20, the storm curved eastward over the northwestern Atlantic. It also began losing tropical characteristics and transitioned into an extratropical cyclone at 0000 UTC on August 22, while located about 325 miles (525 km) south of Sable Island. However, after four days, the system regenerated into a tropical storm while located about 695 miles (1,120 km) west-southwest of Flores Island in the Azores on August 26. It moved slowly north-northwestward, until curving to the east on August 29. Between August 26 and September 1, the storm did not differentiate in intensity, but began re-strengthening while turning southeastward on September 2. Early on the following day, the storm again reached hurricane intensity. It curved northeastward and passed through the Azores on September 3, shortly before transitioning into an extratropical cyclone.

In Guadeloupe, the storm unroofed and flooded many houses. Communications were significantly disrupted in the interior portions of the island. Impact was severe in Montserrat, with nearly every building destroyed and 100 deaths reported. About 200 small houses were destroyed on Saint Kitts, with estates suffering considerable damage, while nearly all estates were destroyed on Saint Croix. Eleven deaths were reported on the island. In Puerto Rico, the system brought strong winds and heavy rainfall, which caused extensive flooding. Approximately 250,000 people were left without food and shelter. Additionally, telephone, telegraph, and electrical services were completely lost. Overall, damage totaled approximately $20 million, with over half being losses inflicted on crops, particularly coffee.

At the time, it was the costliest and worst tropical cyclone in the history of Puerto Rico. It was estimated that the storm caused 3,369 fatalities on the island territory. In the Bahamas, strong winds and waves sank 50 small crafts, most of them at Andros. Severe damage was reported in Nassau, with over 100 buildings destroyed and many damaged, including the Government House. A few houses were also destroyed on Bimini. The death toll in the Bahamas was at least 125. In North Carolina, storm surge and rough sea destroyed fishing piers and bridges, as well as sank about 10 vessels. Hatteras Island was almost entirely inundated with 4 to 10 feet (1.2 to 3.0 m) of water, and many homes were damaged. There was also much destruction at Diamond City, on the Shackleford Banks near Cape Lookout. There were at least 20 deaths in the state of North Carolina. In the Azores, the storm also caused one fatality and significant damage on some islands.

== Meteorological history ==
Map plotting the storm's track and intensity, according to the Saffir–Simpson scale Map key Saffir–Simpson scale Tropical depression (≤38 mph, ≤62 km/h) Tropical storm (39–73 mph, 63–118 km/h) Category 1 (74–95 mph, 119–153 km/h) Category 2 (96–110 mph, 154–177 km/h) Category 3 (111–129 mph, 178–208 km/h) Category 4 (130–156 mph, 209–251 km/h) Category 5 (≥157 mph, ≥252 km/h) Unknown Storm type Tropical cyclone Subtropical cyclone Extratropical cyclone, remnant low, tropical disturbance, or monsoon depression

The storm may have originated from a tropical wave that moved off the west coast of Africa. However, due to observational methods available to contemporary meteorologists, with ship reports being the only reliable tool for observing hurricanes, this is impossible to prove. A tropical storm was first observed about 480 miles (770 km) southwest of the southwesternmost islands of Cape Verde at 00:00 UTC on August 3. According to an article by the United States Hydrographic Office, the British steamship Grangense encountered the system later that day, while located about 1,800 miles (2,900 km) east-southeast of Guadeloupe. According to the ship's log, there was a "sudden change in the weather", falling barometric pressures, and increasingly rough seas. Further, the storm "showed all the symptoms of a genuine West Indian hurricane underdeveloped." The captain, who followed a route from Europe to Brazil for many years, noted that he never experienced "any weather of cyclonic character so far to the eastward before".

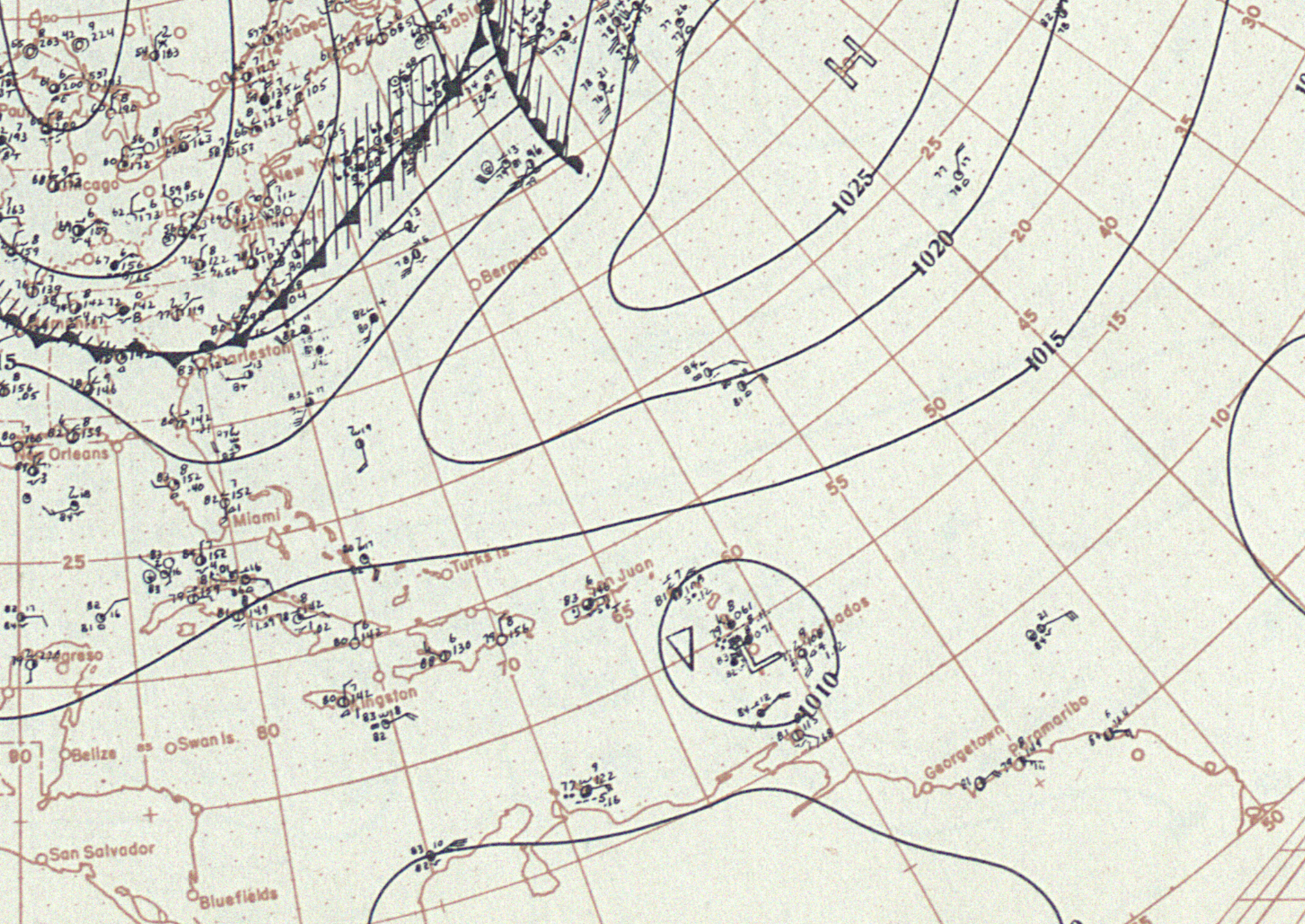
Synoptic weather map of the hurricane approaching the Lesser Antilles on August 7

Thereafter, the storm strengthened and reached winds of 70 mph (110 km/h) early on August 4. Intensification halted until late on the following day, at which time the storm reached hurricane status. Around 18:00 UTC on August 6, it became a Category 2 hurricane. Early the next day, the system deepened to a Category 3. While approaching the Lesser Antilles, it continued to strengthen, reaching Category 4 status around midday on August 7. Shortly thereafter, the hurricane passed through the Lesser Antilles and made landfall on Guadeloupe. At 18:00 UTC on August 7, the system attained its peak intensity with a maximum sustained wind speed of 150 mph (240 km/h) and a minimum barometric pressure of 930 mbar (27 inHg), observed by a weather station on Montserrat.

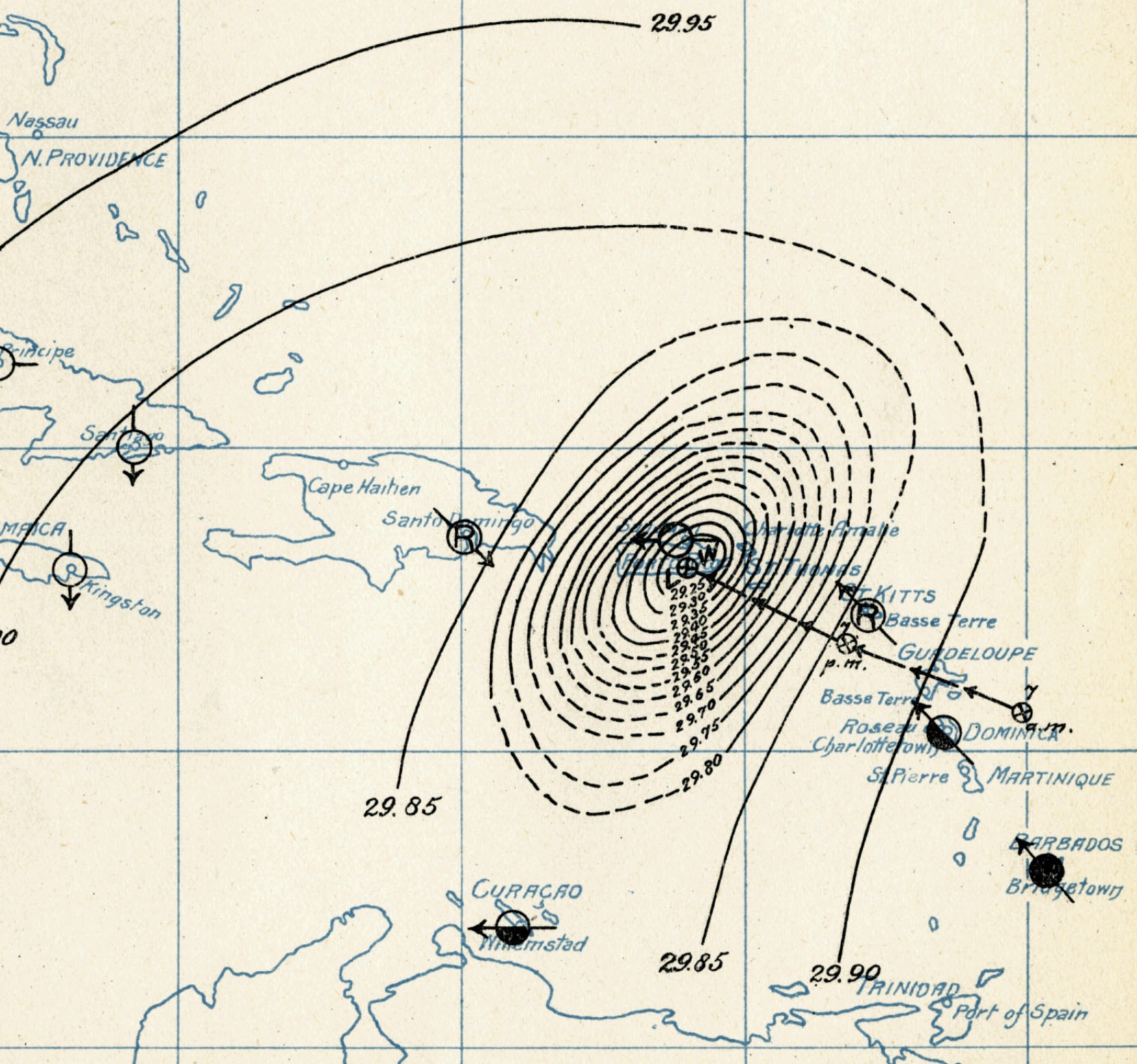
Surface weather map of the hurricane nearing landfall in Puerto Rico on August 8

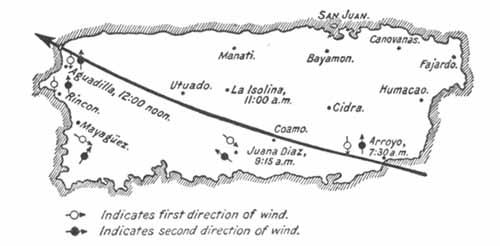
Path of the hurricane across Puerto Rico

The hurricane weakened slightly while moving west-northward across the Caribbean Sea and made landfall in Guayama, Puerto Rico late on August 8 with winds of 140 mph (220 km/h). August 8 was the namesday of Saint Cyriacus, hence the hurricane's nickname. Several weather stations across the island reported low barometric pressures, with a reading as low as 939 mbar (27.7 inHg) in Guayama. Wind shifts were also experienced across the island, primarily in the south and the west. The storm crossed Puerto Rico in approximately six hours and emerged into the Atlantic Ocean late on August 8, while weakening to a Category 3 hurricane, with winds decreasing to 120 mph (195 km/h). The hurricane would maintain this intensity for more than nine days. Continuing west-northward, the hurricane brushed the north coast of Dominican Republic on August 9. Thereafter, the system moved slowly northwestward through the Bahamas, striking Inagua on August 10 and Andros Island on August 12. According to telephone and telegraph reports from the Weather Bureau, the storm was predicted to make landfall in Florida.

However, the storm instead curved north-northwestward and struck Grand Bahama on August 13. The next day, officials at the Weather Bureau predicted that the hurricane would strike Charleston, South Carolina, at which time it would have weakened "into an ordinary blow". The storm instead eventually turned northeastward and moved parallel to the coast of the Southeastern United States for a few days. By early on August 17, however, the hurricane re-curved northwestward. At 01:00 UTC on August 18, it made landfall near Hatteras, North Carolina, with winds of 120 mph (195 km/h). Five hours later, the storm weakened to a Category 2 hurricane. Around midday on August 18, it fell to Category 1 hurricane intensity while re-emerging into the Atlantic Ocean. Thereafter, the storm drifted slowly east-northeastward before accelerating to the northeast after 12:00 UTC on August 19. It moved parallel to Long Island and New England, until curving just north of due east late on the following day.

The system began losing tropical characteristics after interacting with a weather front and transitioned into an extratropical cyclone early on August 22, while situated about 325 miles (525 km) south of Sable Island, Nova Scotia. The extratropical system moved east-southeastward and then southeastward, while continuing to weaken. By August 24, it curved eastward and then northeastward the next day. Operationally, it was believed that the system remained extratropical. However, Partagas indicated that it regenerated into a tropical storm at 00:00 UTC on August 26, while located about 695 miles (1,120 km) southwest of Flores Island, Azores. Initially, the rejuvenated system drifted slowly north-northwestward, before turning northward on August 27. No change in intensity occurred for nearly a week. On August 28, it curved northeastward and then eastward, while continuing to drift.

By September 1, the storm began to accelerate and moved east-southeastward. It resumed intensification the next day after curving southeast, and was upgraded to a hurricane early on September 3, based on barometric pressure data. A few hours later, the hurricane attained a secondary peak intensity with a maximum sustained wind speed of 80 mph (130 km/h). Late on September 3, the storm passed through the Azores, shortly before transitioning into an extratropical cyclone. After becoming extratropical, the remnants moved rapidly northeastward and continued to weaken, before dissipating southwest of Ireland late on September 4. However, the Weather Bureau noted that gales prevailed offshore France until September 12, when the system merged with a low pressure area.

With just under 28 days as a tropical cyclone, this system became the longest-lasting Atlantic hurricane on record.

== Preparations ==
On August 7, after stations in the Lesser Antilles reported a change in wind from the northeast to the northwest, the United States Weather Bureau ordered hurricane signals at Roseau, Dominica, Basseterre, Saint Kitts, and San Juan, Puerto Rico; later, a hurricane signal was raised at Santo Domingo, Dominican Republic. Advisory messages were sent to other locations throughout the Caribbean, including Santo Domingo, Kingston, Jamaica, and Santiago de Cuba, Cuba. Information was also telegraphed to major seaports along the Gulf and East coasts of the United States. On August 9, hurricane signals were posted at Santiago de Cuba, while all vessels bound northward and eastward from Cuba were advised to remain in port.

== Impact ==
Deaths by region
Region	Total deaths
The Bahamas	334
Montserrat	100
Nevis	21
North Carolina	20
Puerto Rico	3,369
Saint Croix	11
Total:	3,855

=== Lesser Antilles ===
While passing through the Leeward Islands, strong winds were reported on several islands. In Guadeloupe, the storm unroofed and flooded many houses and buildings, including the American Consulate in Pointe-à-Pitre. Communications were significantly disrupted in the interior portions of the island. Two schooners sunk and at least 23 flat boats were pushed ashore in the Îles des Saintes archipelago of Guadeloupe. Impact was severe in Montserrat, with nearly every building destroyed. The Courthouse and a school, both of which remained standing, became crowded with homeless women and children. One hundred deaths and fourteen hundred injuries were reported.

In Saint Kitts, 5-minute sustained winds were 72 mph (116 km/h), while 1-minute sustained winds were as high as 120 mph (190 km/h). About 200 small houses were destroyed on Saint Kitts, with estates suffering considerable damage. Despite the impact, no deaths occurred, which was attributed to ample warnings. On Nevis, the hurricane left "general destruction" and at least 21 fatalities. Nearly all estates were demolished on Saint Croix, while almost every large building was deroofed. Eleven deaths were reported on the island.

==== Puerto Rico ====
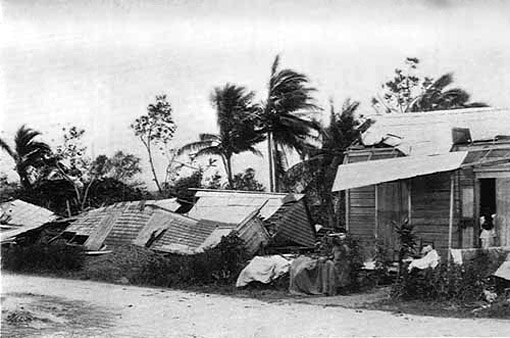
Damage in Puerto Rico after the hurricane

Taking place a mere 12 months after the American invasion of the Island, U.S. Army Major Albert L. Myer described it as "more disruptive to Puerto Rican society than was the American invasion." The San Ciriaco hurricane was described as the first major storm in Puerto Rico since the 1876 San Felipe hurricane. Approximately 250,000 people were left without food and shelter. Overall, damage totaled approximately $35.8 million, with over half were losses inflicted on crops, particularly coffee. At the time, it was the costliest and worst tropical cyclone in Puerto Rico. The number of fatalities ranged from 3,100 to 3,400, with the official estimate being 3,369. The San Ciriaco hurricane is the deadliest tropical cyclone in the history of Puerto Rico.

Strong winds were reported throughout the island, reaching 85 mph (137 km/h) at many locations and over 100 mph (160 km/h) in Humacao, Mayagüez, and Ponce. Within the municipality of Ponce, 500 people died, mostly from drowning. Streets were flooded, waterfront businesses were destroyed, and several government buildings were damaged. Telephone, telegraph, and electrical services were completely lost. Ponce was described as an image of "horrible desolation" by its municipal council. Impact was worst in Utuado, with damage exceeding $2.5 million. In Humacao, 23 inches (580 mm) of rain fell in only 24 hours.

=== Greater Antilles and Bahamas ===
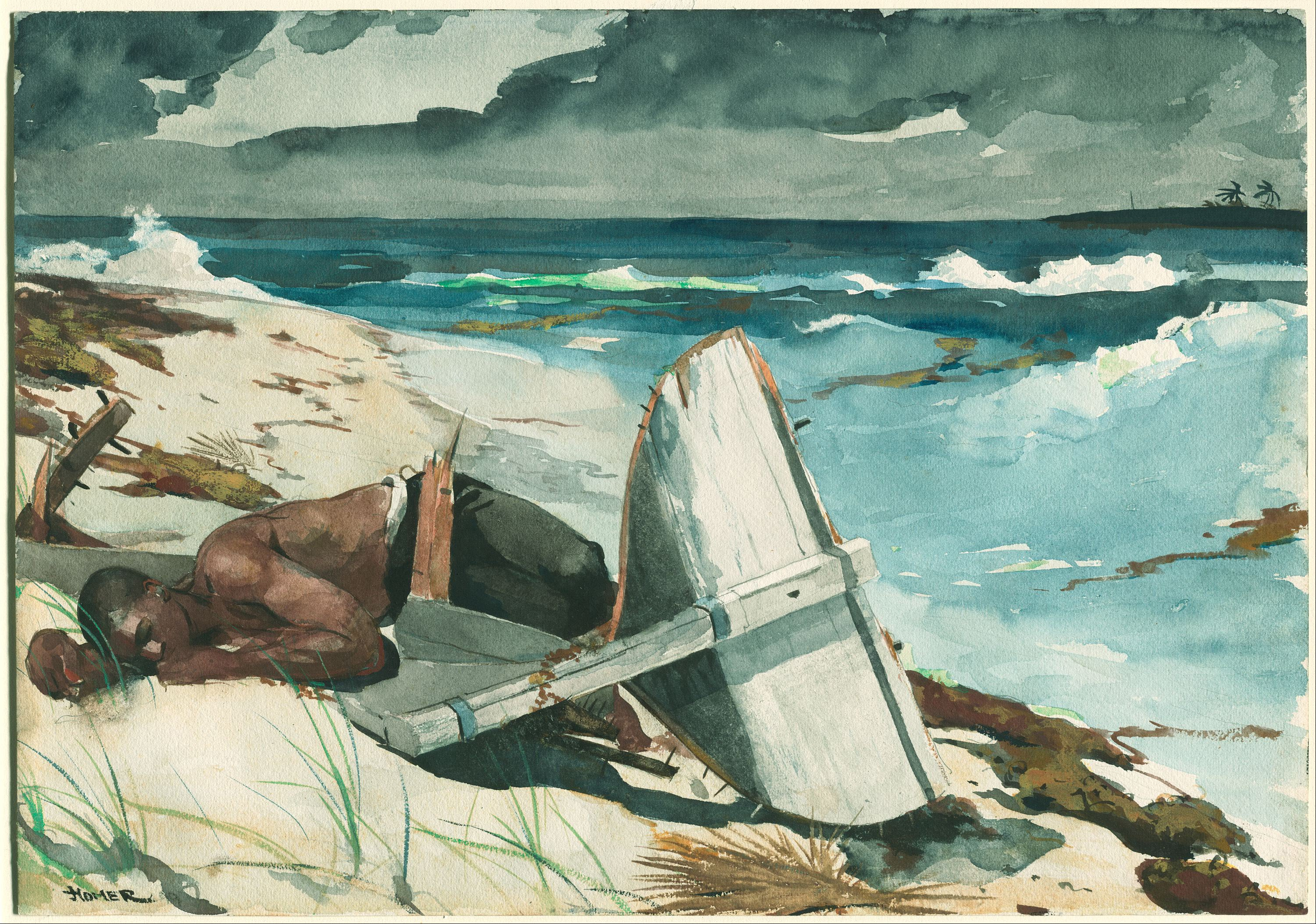
Winslow Homer painting of a man lying on a beach next to his destroyed boat in the Bahamas

In Dominican Republic, heavy rainfall caused the Ozama River to overflow its banks, sweeping away an iron bridge. A freshet was also reported along the Haina River in San Cristóbal Province, washing away many houses.

The storm brought catastrophic impacts to the Bahamas and at least 334 deaths. Losses to boating vessels reached $50,000. On Inagua, three vessels were lost and a schooner was left stranded at Lantern Head, while other boats that were hauled up on the bay suffered severe damage. Air pressure on the island dipped to 28.28 inHg (958 mb). The public school house was demolished on Ragged Island, though dwellings escaped serious impact. Plantain and banana plantations were completely flattened at Deadman's Cay on Long Island. Three vessels were beached on Rum Cay, but only one was considerably damaged. About 10 bushels of salt were lost. Two churches and a number of private homes were damaged on San Salvador Island. A few ships and vessels were destroyed, damaged, or lost on Eleuthera, leaving a few people missing.

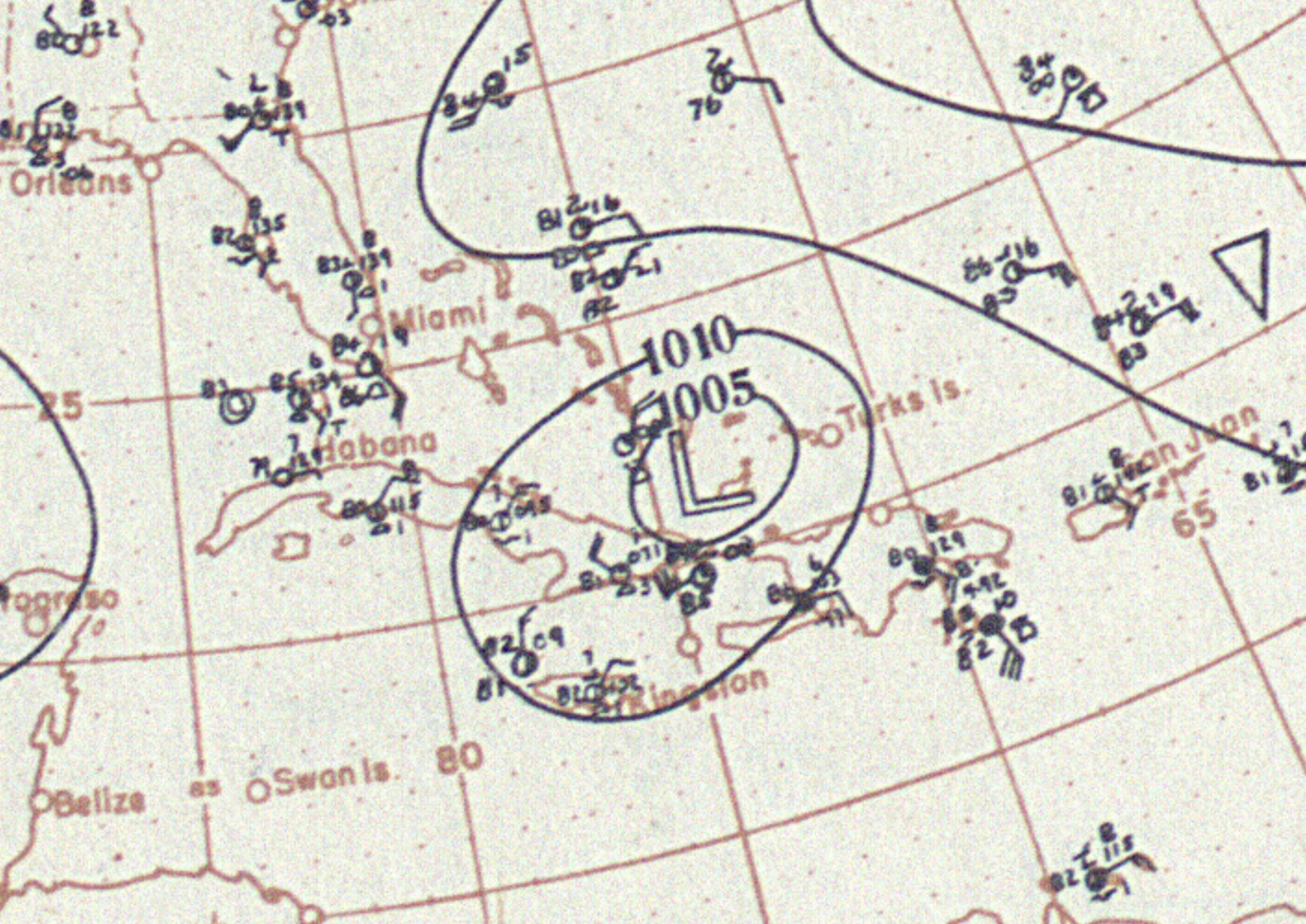
Synoptic weather map showing the hurricane over the Bahamas on August 10

On San Salvador Island, two churches and many dwellings were destroyed. On Bimini, a barometric low of 28.00 inHg (948 mb) was measured during the worst conditions, accompanied by hurricane-force winds from the west-southwest. Not one family escaped serious damage, even on the highest land, and the storm destroyed all the crops, leading to starvation. Many homes were badly damaged or swept off their foundations, along with some churches. On the Berry Islands at least a dozen boats were driven ashore, and an Episcopal church was destroyed. Grand Bahama incurred severe damage, including the loss of most homes and all crops; eyewitnesses reported that the aftermath resembled that of a fire. Between West Settlement Point and East Smith Point the storm leveled at least 62 homes, along with all roads and bridges. A church and chapel were wrecked at Eight Mile Rock, along with 22 homes. Six homes were destroyed at West End and 11 more at Brandy Point.

Exuma was devastated by the storm. All boats and other forms of transportation on the island were destroyed, with several crews either completely lost or missing some few members. Several bodies washed ashore and were immediately buried. A total of 46 deaths were reported at sea, with some victims as young as 8-years old. At Gray's Settlement, several houses, outbuildings, and a church were destroyed. Of the buildings that remained standing, many lost their roof. At Barritarri and Rolleville, churches were deroofed and several small buildings suffered complete destruction. Throughout the island, 97 dwellings were destroyed and 131 others were damaged, which did not include the number of kitchens, barns, and homes demolished at Alexandria and Stuart's Manor. Overall, the storm left at least 64 fatalities on Exuma alone.

Within the capital city of Nassau, fences and boundary walls separating businesses and properties were felled. A fruit factory, a sponge warehouse, a dancing pavilion, and about 100 smaller buildings were destroyed. A few public buildings were damaged, including the prison and the Government House. Damage to homes in Nassau was light in comparison to the dwellings in the suburbs, where lower-class homes suffered extensive impact or were completely destroyed. A total of 44 multi-family residences were demolished. Many adobes in Adelaide were flattened, forcing 12 families to live in a church. Three people suffered serious injuries after a home near Gambier was destroyed. The entire community of Gambier was reportedly wiped out. Local agriculture also experienced significant impact, with two orchards alone losing many trees and thousands of fruits. All sisal plantations on the island were demolished.

Of the 50 small crafts capsized by strong winds and waves in the Bahamas, a majority of these were located at Andros Island. Several settlements along the northern portions of the island were devastated, with numerous homes flattened and all crops were destroyed, including coconuts, corn, grapefruit, oranges, peas, and potatoes. At Red Bays, two churches were destroyed and many houses were washed away. Several sponging vessels were beached, resulting in an "astronomical" number of casualties. Only seven homes remained standing at Nicholls Town. A church was demolished along the Staniard Creek. At Coakley Town, several houses were blown down, while a number of vessels sunk. Overall, at least 114 deaths occurred on land alone. Several schooners were lost near Andros Island, while at least 30 other schooners were driven ashore and severely damaged or demolished.

=== United States and elsewhere ===
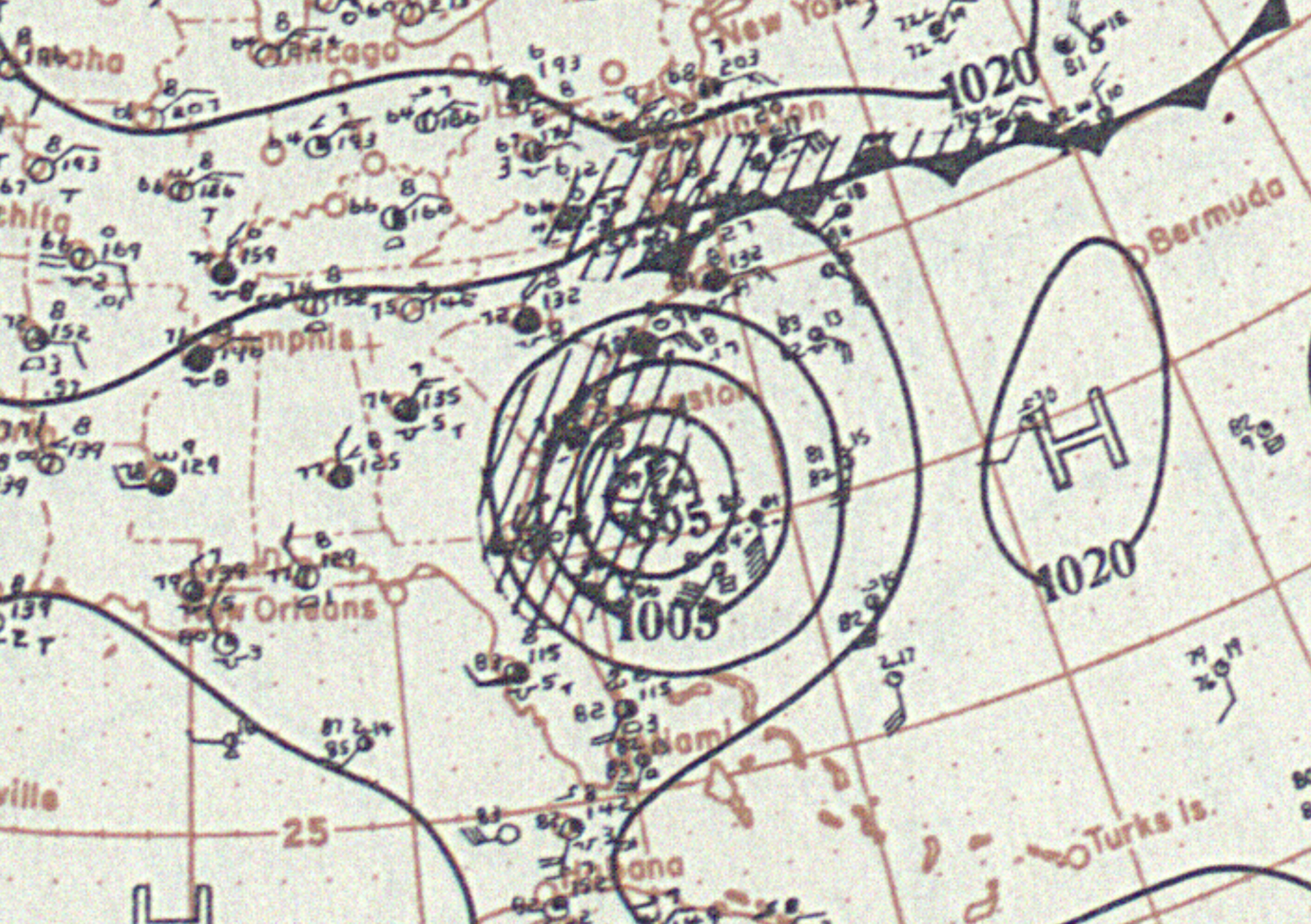
Synoptic weather map showing the hurricane moving up the U.S East Coast on August 15

Offshore the United States between Florida and North Carolina, the Norwegian bark Drot encountered the hurricane. A large wave swept the captain and seven crewmen overboard. The remaining men built a makeshift raft out of the ship's plank in order to survive. However, the raft split into two, with two men on one portion and six on the other. On the former raft, a person committed suicide by jumping into the raging sea, but the other man was eventually rescued by the German steamship Titania. Three of the six men on the other raft also jumped into the sea. Because the remaining three men realized that they were facing starvation or death by dehydration, they drew lots to determine who would be cannibalized by the other two. The loser was killed, and the other two drank blood from his veins. One of them then went insane and bit large chunks of flesh from the other man's face and chest. On August 31, two weeks after the ship sunk, the two survivors were finally rescued by the British steamer Woodruff.

The Weather Bureau office in Jupiter, Florida, recorded sustained winds of 52 mph (84 km/h) and a gusts up to 63 mph (101 km/h). Winds downed all telegraph lines in the area, which disrupted telegraphic communications for about 48 hours. Brief periods of heavy rainfall were also reported. At The Breakers hotel in Palm Beach, storm surge ripped off the upper portion of the ocean deck, which consisted of railings, a canopy, and a flagpole. Between Titusville and Miami, losses reached $5,000. Tides along the coast of South Carolina peaked at 2.8 ft (0.85 m), resulting in no coastal flooding. Well executed warnings were attributed to no fatalities in South Carolina.

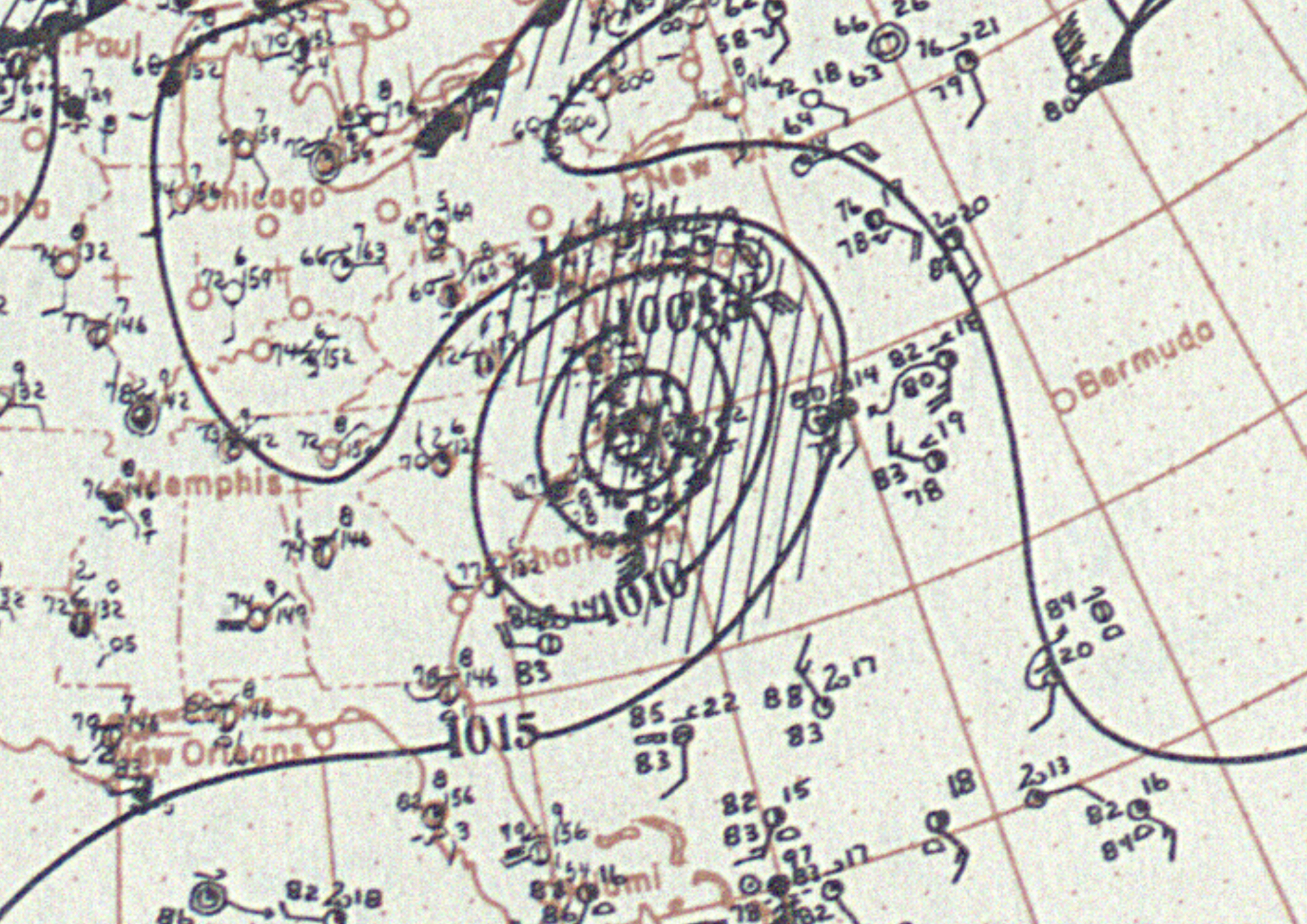
Synoptic weather map showing the hurricane nearing landfall in North Carolina on August 18

Strong winds were observed in coastal North Carolina, with sustained winds up to 93 mph (150 km/h) and gusts as high as 140 mph (230 km/h). However, the anemometer then blew away. According to the Weather Bureau, "the entire island" of Hatteras was submerged in 4 to 10 ft (1.2 to 3.0 m) of water due to storm surge. A personal account by Weather Bureau observer S. L. Dosher noted that it was typical for 40 to 50 individuals in Hatteras to seek shelter in a home because of coastal flooding, only to be forced to venture to another dwelling due to rising water. In only four houses, less than 1 ft (0.30 m) of water was recorded. All fishing piers and equipment were destroyed, while every bridge was swept away. About 10 vessels, including a large steamship, were wrecked.

Dosher sent a report to Washington, D.C., on August 21, four days after the storm hit the Outer Banks. In his report Dosher wrote:

"The howling wind, the rushing and roaring tide and the awful sea which swept over the beach and thundered like a thousand pieces of artillery made a picture which was at once appalling and terrible and the like of which Dante's Inferno could scarcely equal." He stated, "At about 8 p.m. on the 17th when the wind lulled and shifted to the east and the tide began to run off with great swiftness, causing a fall of several feet in less than a half hour, a prayer of thankfulness went up from every soul on the island, and strong men, who had held up a brave heart against the terrible strain of the past 12 hours, broke down and wept like children..."

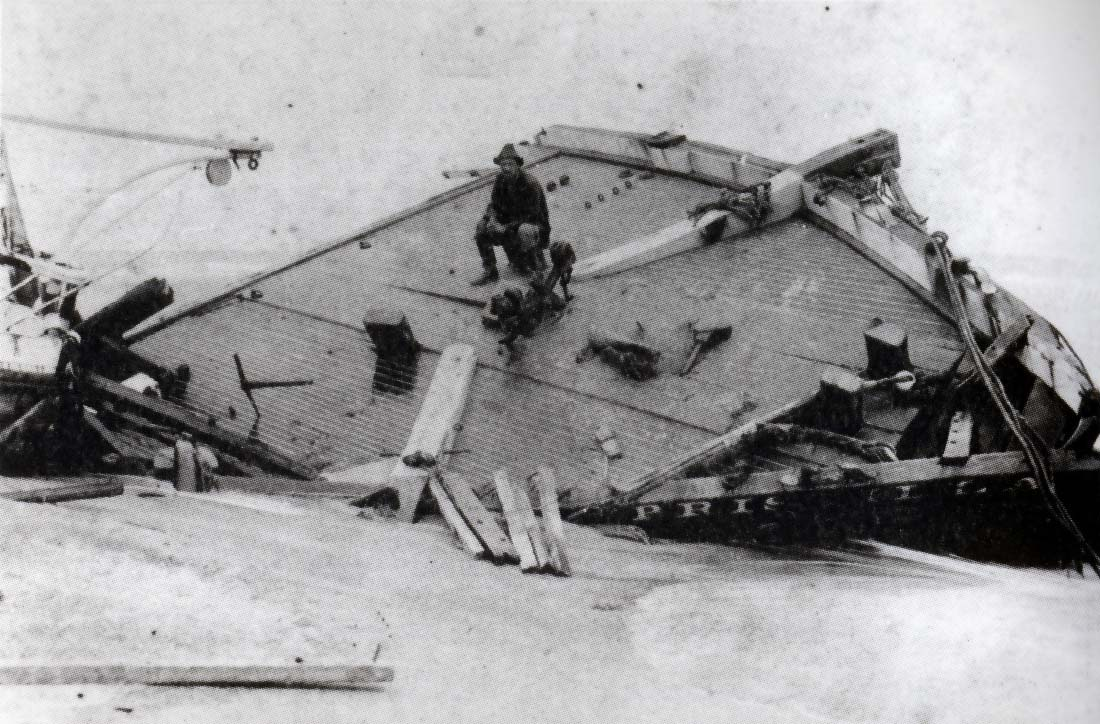
Rasmus Midgett sits on the wreckage of the Priscilla, which was situated about halfway between Salvo and Avon

Severe damage also occurred at Diamond City and Shackleford Banks, where nearly every house was swept away. A number of farm animals drowned. The tides unearthed caskets, damaging them and leaving bones scattered throughout the towns. After the storm, residents began abandoning the area and re-settled in other cities, most of them located elsewhere in the Outer Banks. On Ocracoke Island, the island was covered with 4 to 5 feet (1.2 to 1.5 metres) of water. A total of 33 homes were destroyed and nearly every other suffered damage. Additionally, two churches were demolished. Several cows, horses, and sheep drowned. Among the ships that wrecked was the barkentine Priscilla. Rasmus Midgett, a United States Life-Saving Service member, single-handedly rescued 10 people from the Priscilla. On October 18, Midgett was awarded the Lifesaving Medal by Secretary of the Treasury Lyman J. Gage. Heavy rains and strong winds as far inland as Raleigh resulted in "great damage" to crops. There were at least 20 fatalities in North Carolina.

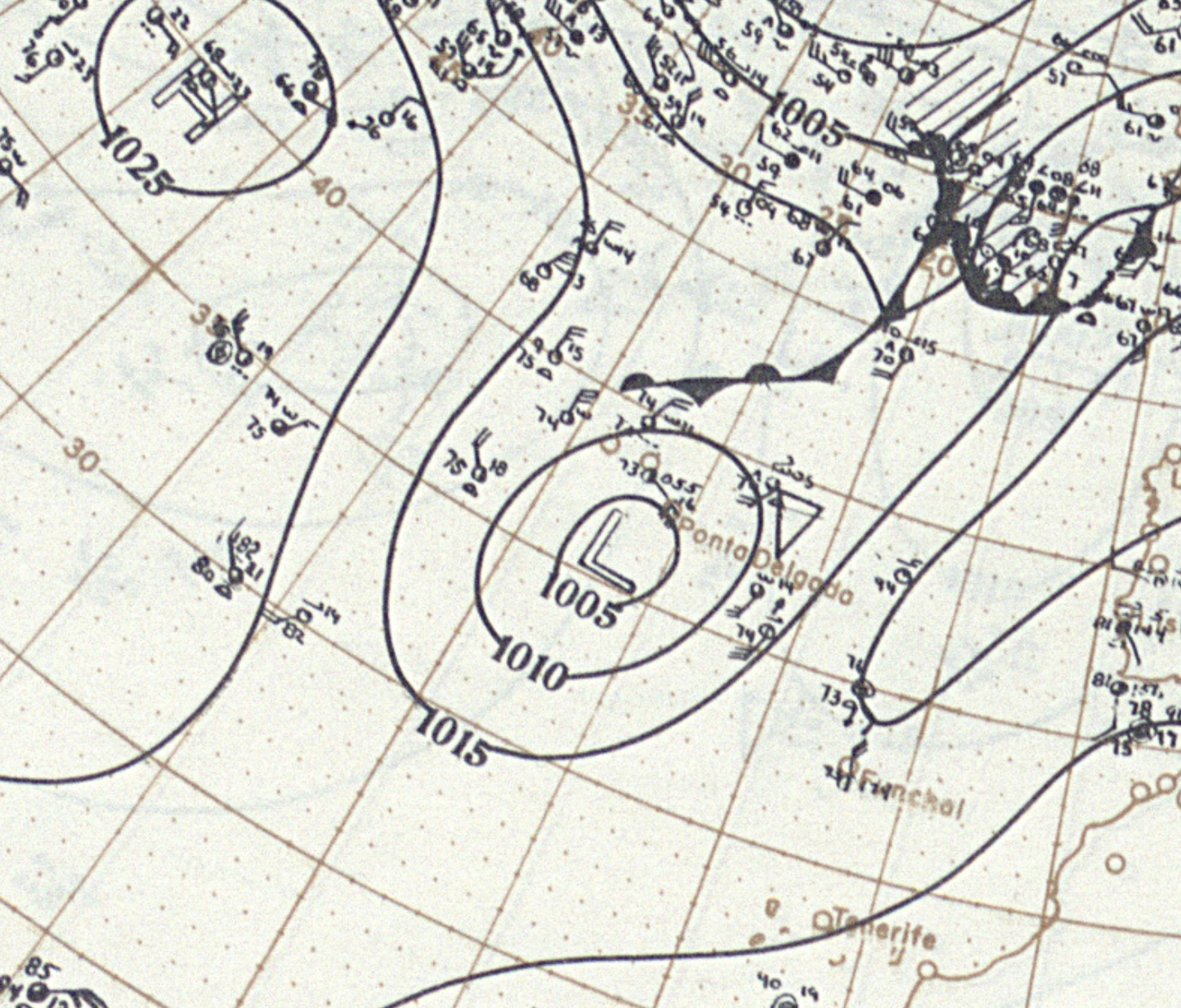
Synoptic weather map on September 3, showing the hurricane approaching the Azores

Strong winds were also reported in Virginia. At Cape Henry, winds peaked at 68 mph (109 km/h) for five minutes. In Norfolk, five-minute sustained winds reached 42 miles per hour (68 km/h). The storm was quite severe along the James River, with low-lying areas of Norfolk inundated by wind-driven tides, while livestock drowned in the flood waters at Suffolk. A "heavy northeastern storm" began in Petersburg the night of August 17. In Southside Virginia, corn and tobacco suffered considerable damage as crops were leveled by strong winds.

In the Azores, "several lives were lost" on São Miguel Island. Strong winds and heavy rainfall damaged many houses, inundated several roads, and toppled a number of telegraph poles.

== Aftermath and records ==
Some wealthy citizens and local governments in Puerto Rico provided food and shelter in the immediate aftermath of the storm, but their resources were too limited to effectively handle the disaster. Following Military Governor George Whitefield Davis's initial assessment of damage, he requested that the federal government appeal to citizens for aid. In San Juan, Major John Van Hoff established a Board of Charities, which was staffed by military doctors and clergy. Davis requested that similar committees be developed and headed by three "people of respectability" in each town. At the time, the island was divided into 12 military districts. Davis ordered that commanding officers assess damage in each district and report the number of citizens without food and shelter. Hundreds submitted petitions for tax relief, including 369 in Lares alone. The destruction of infrastructure made it difficult to deliver aid, especially because of an 11 mi (18 km) section of railroad destroyed between Añasco and Mayagüez. Many roads and bridges were rebuilt in the following months. However, because the railroads were privately owned, the government hesitated to begin repairs. Various municipal governments proposed 25 million to 30 million pesos in bonds to fund restoration efforts.

On August 24, the USAT McClellan departed the United States Quartermaster's dock in Brooklyn after being filled with supplies by the Puerto Rican Relief Committee of the Merchant's Association including 12,600 vests for women, 4,800 women's wrappers, 4,200 undershirts for men, 600 pairs of trousers, and 215 children's garments. H. C. F. Koch & Co. also sent 265 articles of women and children's clothing. Additionally, the Windsor Company donated one case of calico, the Renfrew Machinery Company contributed one case of gingham, the Hines Underwear Company gave away knit underwear, and the National Biscuit Company (now known as Nabisco) sent 30 barrels of bread.

In the Bahamas, the House of Assembly held a special session to vote for a measure that authorized expenditure for relief throughout the country. Additionally, Colonial Secretary Joseph Chamberlain called on several vessels to distribute and render assistance to the Out Islands. The British Government enacted the Hurricane Warning Act, which ordered that hurricane signal flags be hoisted at Fort Charlotte and Fort Fincastle in the event of a hurricane. The new regulation also required these flags to be raised when the barometric pressure fell to a certain point. Additionally, the Imperial Lighthouse Service issued a set of signal flags to all lighthouses in the Bahamas.

There was so much destruction in Diamond City, North Carolina that the approximately 500 residents of the settlement and island decided to move inland. The last of the residents had left by 1902, and even relocated houses to nearby places such as Harkers Island, Salter Path and Morehead City.

Hurricane San Ciriaco set many records on its path. Resulting in at least 3,369 deaths in Puerto Rico, the storm was the deadliest hurricane to hit the island and the strongest at the time, until the Hurricane San Felipe Segundo made landfall in 1928 as a Category 5 hurricane. It was also among the deadliest Atlantic hurricanes ever recorded.

Also, with an accumulated cyclone energy of 73.57, it has the highest ACE of any Atlantic hurricane in history and was second highest overall, until surpassed by 2023's Cyclone Freddy. In 2004, Hurricane Ivan became the second Atlantic hurricane to surpass an ACE value of 70, but did not surpass the San Ciriaco hurricane.

The San Ciriaco hurricane is also the longest-lasting Atlantic hurricane in recorded history, lasting for 27.75 days.

=== Migration to Hawaii ===
The hurricane was one of the reasons why some 5,000 Puerto Ricans migrated to Hawaii. Two historians, living in Hawaii, documented the history of Puerto Rican migration to Hawaii and stated the San Ciriaco hurricane was one of the main reasons why Puerto Ricans went to Hawaii. "Nicolas G. Vegas wrote in his Narración Patriótica (Patriotic Narration):

De aquel país borincano
Tierras de tan lindas flores
De allí salimos, señores.
A este suelo hawaiiano. . . .

Nadie pensaba olvidar
Aquel amable rincón
Y por causa del ciclón
Nos tuvimos que embarcar
Y empezamos a navegar
Para distantes regiones
Afligidos corazones
Dejamos a nuestra espalda
Y de aquella tierra sana
De allí salimos, señores.

Translation:

From that Borinquen land
Lands with such beautiful flowers
From there we left, sirs,
For this Hawaiian land. . . .

Nobody thought he would forget
That friendly part of the world
And because of the cyclone
We had to set sail
And we began to navigate
For distant regions
Afflicted hearts
We left behind us
And from that healthy land
From there we left, sirs."

== Name ==
The hurricane earned its name by striking Puerto Rico on August 8, the Roman Catholic feast day devoted to Saint Cyriacus (San Ciriaco in Spanish). This was a common practice prior to the introduction of standardized hurricane names – for example, the 1867 San Narciso hurricane, the 1928 San Felipe hurricane, and the 1932 San Ciprian hurricane were also named after the feast day on which they occurred.

== See also ==
- History of Puerto Rico
- List of Atlantic hurricane records
- Puerto Rican immigration to Hawaii
- 1893 San Roque hurricane – Followed a similar path across Puerto Rico six years earlier
- 1928 Okeechobee hurricane – A powerful hurricane that made landfall on Puerto Rico at Category 5 intensity, and later brought severe destruction and loss of life in Florida
- 1932 San Ciprián hurricane – Another Category 4 hurricane that struck Puerto Rico and Hispaniola
- Hurricane John (1994) – The longest-lived tropical cyclone on record until 2023
- Hurricane Maria (2017) – An intense hurricane that devastated Puerto Rico and caused a humanitarian crisis on the island
