= Barden Inlet =

Coordinates: 34°38′11″N 76°31′19″W

Barden Inlet is the southernmost of the Outer Banks water inlets. Located just northwest of Cape Lookout in the U.S. state of North Carolina, the inlet connects Onslow Bay of the Atlantic Ocean with Core Sound. It separates the Shackleford Banks from the Core Banks.

Barden Inlet was opened by the 1933 Outer Banks Hurricane, separating the Shackleford Banks from South Core Banks. The new channel gave Harkers Island fishermen a new, direct access route to offshore fishing grounds. It was named Barden Inlet after US Congressman Graham Barden, who sponsored legislation to require that the United States Army Corps of Engineers use dredging equipment to maintain the new channel.
