= Harkers Island, North Carolina =

- Census-designated place
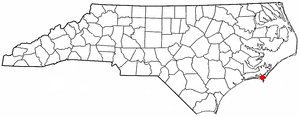
- Location of Harkers Island, North Carolina
- Coordinates: 34°41′58″N 76°33′31″W
- Country: United States
- State: North Carolina
- County: Carteret

Area
  - Total: 3.85 sq mi (9.97 km^{2})
  - Land: 2.24 sq mi (5.80 km^{2})
  - Water: 1.61 sq mi (4.16 km^{2})
- Elevation: 7 ft (2.1 m)

Population (2020)
  - Total: 1,127
  - Density: 502.8/sq mi (194.15/km^{2})
- Time zone: UTC-5 (Eastern (EST))
  - Summer (DST): UTC-4 (EDT)
- ZIP code: 28531
- Area code: 252
- FIPS code: 37-29560
- GNIS feature ID: 2402566

Harkers Island is a census-designated place (CDP) in Carteret County, North Carolina, United States. As of the 2020 census, Harkers Island had a population of 1,127. Harkers Island is unincorporated and receives most public services, including law enforcement and public education, from Carteret County. A membership cooperative provides the island with electric and water services. Major industries on the island include fishing, boat building, tourism, and waterfowl decoy carving.

Formerly named Davers Ile and Craney Island, Harkers Island was occupied by Native Americans of the Coree tribe when the first European explorers arrived in the 16th century. Ownership of Harkers Island was first titled to Farnifold Green, a native of the Carolina colony, by the lord proprietor in 1707. Ebenezer Harker purchased the island in 1730, settled there with his family, and built a plantation and boat yard. The island became known as Harkers Island soon after his death. A large immigration of islanders fleeing the hurricane-ravaged Outer Banks in 1899 dramatically increased the island population, which largely depended on fishing and boat building. Separated from the mainland for centuries, many Harkers Island residents speak a distinct dialect of English, earning them the nickname "Hoi toiders."

== History ==
Before the arrival of European explorers and settlers, Harkers Island was inhabited by Native Americans of the Coree tribe, who likely spoke a language of the Algonquian family, like most coastal tribes. The nearby Core Sound and Core Banks are named after the Coree. The Coree left little in the way of evidence of permanent habitation on Harkers Island, except for a large mound of oyster shells at Shell Point on the eastern end of the island. Similar shell mounds were found by Europeans on the Shackleford Banks and other islands of the Outer Banks. The exact purpose of the mounds for the Coree remains unknown, but varying cultures of indigenous peoples in the Southeast had been building major earthwork mounds since 3500 BCE, the Middle Archaic period, usually related to religious and ceremonial uses.

In 1584, an English expedition financed by Sir Walter Raleigh and led by Philip Amadas and Arthur Barlowe explored the North Carolina coast for a suitable site for the first English colony in North America. Two Native Americans, Wanchese and Manteo, accompanied the expedition back to England in the fall of 1584. According to local island legend, Wanchese was a Coree from Harkers Island. The island was first charted on the maps drawn by John White during the 1584 expedition, but it was unnamed at the time. The island appears on a 1624 map of the greater Virginia coastline created by Captain John Smith. On that map, the island is labeled "Davers Ile", probably for Sir John Davers, one of the founders of Jamestown in 1607.

On December 20, 1707, Farnifold Green obtained the first patent for land in the Core Sound area from the lord proprietor of the Carolina colony, which had been established by the English monarch Charles I in 1633. This patent included Harkers Island, which was then known as Craney Island. On June 25, 1709, Green sold the island to William Brice for £5, who on the very same day sold it to Thomas Sparrow III (1674–1717) for £10. Sparrow soon sold the island to Thomas Pollock, who would twice be governor of North Carolina (from 1712 to 1714 and again in 1722). Pollock did not take up residence on the island, but had several farm buildings erected and then leased to settlers. The 1720 lease to a Captain Stone was £3 a year. Thomas Pollock's son George inherited the island upon his father's death on August 30, 1722.

=== Settlement of Ebenezer Harker ===
George Pollock sold Craney Island to Ebenezer Harker on September 15, 1730, for £400 and "one boate twentey foot long with oars & mast". Harker had immigrated to Massachusetts from England on a ship that set sail from Wales. Living in Boston, Harker had been involved in the whaling trade, and became familiar with the North Carolina coast during this time. Harker had moved to Beaufort, North Carolina, by 1728, where he was appointed a tax collector for the whale oil revenue generated in the area. After purchasing the island, Harker took up residence there with his family and began building a small plantation and boat yard. Harker sold half of the island to his nephew John Stevens of Onslow County on March 8, 1733, for £300, with many restrictions on its agricultural use. Prohibited from farming or ranching the land for profit, Stevens eventually sold his half of the island back to his uncle on June 9, 1737, for just £180.

The Harker plantation and boat building facility were located at the western end of the island, near Harker Point, and grew to support an extended family with three sons, two daughters, and at least nine African slaves. Ebenezer would be the last sole landowner of the island. In 1752, he deeded approximately 10 acres (4.0 ha) of the island to his daughter Hepsobeth and her husband Nathan Yeomans as a wedding gift. On his death in 1762, his son Zachariah inherited the western third of the island, an adult slave woman named Vilet, and a young female slave named Daisie.

Another son, James, inherited the eastern third of the island, an adult slave woman named Hague and a young male slave named Peter. Ebenezer Jr. inherited the central third of the island, an adult male slave named Jeffrey, and a young male slave named Sutton. Hepsobeth inherited "one barrel of corn", and Ebenezer's other married daughter, Sarah Freshwater, was given a female slave named Hope. The fate of an elderly female slave named Badge and a young male slave named Ben was left to the heirs to decide. The will referred to "Craney Island"; the name "Harkers Island" was only adopted after Ebenezer's death.

The sons of Ebenezer prospered on Harkers Island. Ebenezer Jr. was elected Sheriff of Carteret County in 1758. Zachariah Harker developed a salt works on the western third of Harkers Island in 1776. In the following years, Zachariah and his brothers became supporters of the American Revolution, and Zachariah was appointed one of five captains in the Carteret Regiment fighting against the British. Harkers Island was involved in the Battle of Beaufort, North Carolina. Revolutionaries used warehouse facilities on Harkers Island to store provisions sought by British troops who had seized the nearby county seat of Beaufort. Thirteen men guarding the stores on Harkers Island, probably led by Zachariah Harker, repulsed British troops in a brief battle on April 6, 1782. The first national census of 1790 recorded 16 white residents and 13 slaves on Harkers Island. By 1800, the population had expanded to 26 white residents, 16 slaves, and 7 "others", probably those of mixed race or freed slaves. Ebenezer Jr., James, and Zachariah Harker died in 1803, 1814, and 1824, respectively.

=== Nineteenth century ===
Harkers Island remained sparsely populated until the latter part of the 19th century. The island saw no direct military conflict in the American Civil War; however, Union warships anchored near the island to control access to Bogue Sound and Core Sound during the Battle of Fort Macon. The besieged Confederate garrison at Fort Macon surrendered on April 26, 1862. Harkers Island and the surrounding area remained under Union control for the duration of the war. The few, if any, descendants of the Harker slaves still living on the island likely left soon after emancipation. The vast majority of the freed slaves in the coastal societies of Carteret and Craven counties either emigrated to other parts of the state, or moved into their own, separate communities, such as Davis Ridge, the North River Community, and Craven Corner.

In 1864, the first school on the island was established when Miss Jenny Bell came to Harkers Island from Boston, sponsored by the Northern Methodist Episcopal Church. A fish oil factory was built on the island in 1865 and remained operational until 1873. A small milling facility was built on the west end of the island in 1870 by Louie Larson, an immigrant from Norway, but it closed before the turn of the 20th century. Most island residents continued to earn a subsistence living from boat building or fishing.

=== The Hurricane of 1899 ===
Harkers Island saw an influx of new residents after hurricanes in 1896 and 1899 devastated the communities established on the nearby Core Banks and Shackleford Banks. Mostly fishermen and whalers, the people of the Outer Banks began openly debating the merits of moving after the Hurricane of 1896. William Henry Guthrie of Diamond City was one of the first to relocate, buying 64.5 acres (26.1 ha) of land on Harkers Island in 1897. Some others moved to more sheltered locations on the coast, but most Shackleford residents remained on the Banks. Diamond City was by far the largest town in that area of the coast, with over 700 inhabitants.

Three years later, another hurricane hit the Carolina coast, and this time the disaster for the residents of the Shackleford Banks was total. Diamond City was completely destroyed by the August 17 Hurricane of 1899. The storm ravaged the Banks' protective sand dunes, and washed away nearly all of the top soil. Orchards and maritime forest on the Banks soon began dying from the salt left behind by the storm surge. Homes were ripped from their foundations, shattered, or submerged. Even graves in the local cemeteries were uprooted and disturbed. A botanist who visited the Banks after the storm described the landscape as completely devastated.

Many families used boats to move what was left of their houses, plank by plank, from the Outer Banks to Harkers Island where they could rebuild. Some settled on the Guthrie property, which he began to subdivide. Others purchased or leased land on the island anywhere they could. Some emigrated to Morehead City, on the mainland, where they built a new neighborhood soon nicknamed "The Promised Land". The last resident had left Diamond City by 1902. In the five years between 1895 and 1900, the population of Harkers Island expanded fourfold from just 13 extended families to over 1,000 residents. The island had gone from being one of the smallest communities in Carteret County to one of the largest.

Elders of the Church of Jesus Christ of Latter-day Saints (LDS Church) proselytized extensively on Harkers Island after the hurricanes. Many of the refugees from Diamond City, uprooted physically and emotionally by the devastating hurricanes, converted to the Latter Day Saints, and soon outnumbered the members of the Methodist Episcopal Church, which had been founded on the island in 1875. A national wave of anti-Mormon sentiment was sparked by the Smoot Hearings in 1904, fueling fears that Mormons secretly continued to practice polygamy. The relationship between the Mormons on Harkers Island and their neighbors deteriorated.

Residents threw rocks and oyster shells through the windows of the LDS meetinghouse and fired at least one gunshot into the building. In 1906, arsonists burned the meetinghouse to the ground. Organized Mormon religious services did not resume on Harkers Island until 1909. A new LDS meetinghouse was constructed on the island in the 1930s. Despite these difficult beginnings, Harker's Island has one of the highest percentages of residents as members of the Latter-day Saints of any locality in North Carolina.

=== Twentieth century ===
Harkers Island gradually became more connected to North Carolina and the world at large early in the 20th century. With the influx of new residents from the Outer Banks, a post office was opened in 1904. The first public road to extend the length of the island, Harkers Island Drive, was built in 1926 when a footpath was widened and paved with the oyster shells from the Coree mound at Shell Point. The road was hard paved by the county in 1936. The road and the post office were connected to the mainland by a ferry service until the Earl C. Davis Memorial Bridge was built in 1941.

A wooden structure, the bridge connected the northwestern end of Harkers Island to the small town of Straits directly to the north. The location of the bridge was a matter of some local controversy at the time. Most islanders would have preferred a bridge to the west, connecting the island directly to the city of Beaufort with its commercial infrastructure and the county hospital. Local politics and the shorter distance to Straits likely dictated the final location of the bridge. A local political effort to relocate the bridge during its renovation to a steel structure in 1966 also failed.

The 1933 Outer Banks Hurricane which made landfall on September 15 would forever change the economy of Harkers Island. The storm was blamed for at least 21 fatalities in North Carolina (although none on Harkers Island) and an estimated US$1 million of damage. The storm surge damaged fisheries and inland waterways, but there was one unexpected beneficial result. Retreating storm surge and heavy rainfall combined to carve out a new channel in the Banks, separating the Core Banks from the Shackleford Banks near the Cape Lookout Lighthouse. This new channel gave Harkers Island fishermen a new, direct access route to offshore fishing grounds. The new channel was named Barden Inlet after US Senator Graham Barden, who sponsored legislation to require that the United States Army Corps of Engineers use dredging equipment to maintain the new channel.

More economic opportunity for Harkers Island came as the country began pulling itself out of the Great Depression. Electrification came to the island in 1939. The Harkers Island Rural Electric Authority was the first electrical cooperative in the United States to supply power to members through a submarine cable system. In November 1941, the construction of a new United States Marine Corps Air Station at Cherry Point, 30 miles (48 km) to the northwest of Harkers Island, brought more wage-earning jobs to the local economy. When the United States entered World War II, Harkers Island was on the front lines. German submarines patrolled the North Carolina coast and sank merchant shipping traffic, especially oil tankers. Island residents could watch the tankers burning offshore at night. Further improvements in the island's utility services would have to wait until after the war. Telephone service finally arrived in 1948.

=== The National Seashore ===
The Shackleford Banks played an important economic role for the people of Harkers Island throughout much of the 20th century. Islanders continued to use the Banks for livestock grazing, including sheep, goats, cattle, and horses. Harkers Island fishermen first built seasonal camps and later cottages on the Banks. A herd of feral horses on the Shackleford Banks provided new colts every spring to those from Harkers Island who rounded them up. The islanders viewed the improvements of cottages, horse corrals, and campsites as an extension of their economic livelihood on Harkers Island.

All of that would change with the government determination to acquire the barrier islands for public park land. The state of North Carolina began purchasing land on the Core Banks and Shackleford Banks in 1959 with the intention of creating a state park. The federal government became interested a few years later, and envisioned the Outer Banks of North Carolina being included in a string of national seashores stretching the length of the United States Atlantic coast. After negotiations between the state of North Carolina and the United States Department of the Interior, the United States Congress passed a law authorizing the creation of a Cape Lookout National Seashore, which was signed into law by President Lyndon Baines Johnson on March 10, 1966.

Conversion of the Banks to a national park brought much turmoil to Harkers Island. Many Harkers Island fishermen discovered that cottages and other improvements they had made on the Banks were on land that would be condemned. Many land deeds had recording errors, some had been poorly surveyed, and natural changes to the shorelines affected many claims. Few of the cottages that had been built were on land that the builders owned. Legal eviction and condemnation proceedings lasted into the 1980s. The creation of the park also ended the open grazing of livestock on the Banks by December 31, 1985. A herd of wild horses, allegedly descended from Spanish horses that swam to shore from shipwrecks in the 16th century, was allowed to remain on the Banks. In late December of that year, a series of arson fires destroyed most of the major structures on the Shackleford Banks, including a recently constructed park visitor center. An inquiry by the Federal Bureau of Investigation failed to discover the arsonists.

The creation of the National Seashore marked the end of a lifestyle practiced by many Harkers Island residents. Fishing and boat building remain important components of the community's economy, but are increasingly augmented with tourism. Visitors arrive at Harkers Island seeking access to the National Seashore, for sport fishing opportunities, and to experience the local cultural heritage of the islands.

== Geography ==
Harkers Island is located south of the center of Carteret County. The Harkers Island census-designated place covers the entire island and extends slightly out into the surrounding water. According to the United States Census Bureau, the CDP has a total area of 3.9 square miles (10.0 km^{2}), of which 2.2 square miles (5.8 km^{2}) is land and 1.6 square miles (4.2 km^{2}), or 41.76%, is water. At its highest point, the island is 19 feet (5.8 m) above mean sea level, in an area known as the "sand hole", on the western end of the island, made up of mostly white sand on rolling dunes.

Harkers Island is protected from the Atlantic Ocean by the barrier islands of the Shackleford Banks to the south and the Core Banks to the east. The body of water directly south of the island is Back Sound. To the east is Core Sound, to the north is The Straits, and to the northwest is the mouth of the North River. The Straits are shallow but navigable by those with local experience. There are two small bays on the north side of the island, Westmouth Bay and Eastmouth Bay. North of Eastmouth Bay is Browns Island, which is accessible only by boat. Harkers Island Road, designated as State Road 1335, connects the island to the mainland by the Earl C. Davis Memorial Bridge, a steel swing bridge built in 1968 to replace a wooden bridge built in 1941.

== Government and services ==
Harkers Island is unincorporated and receives most public services, including law enforcement and public education, from Carteret County. Law enforcement on the island is provided by the Carteret County Sheriff Department. The only public school on the island, Harkers Island Elementary, educates students from kindergarten through fifth grade, and is operated by Carteret County Public Schools. The school has won the state Battle of the Books competition twice and has been to the competition for four years in a row; both are state records. There are no hospitals on Harkers Island. The local newspaper is the Carteret County News-Times, published in Morehead City. Electricity service and drinking water are both provided by the Harkers Island Electric Membership Corporation, a cooperative operating as both a Rural Electrical Authority and the manager of the water system for the Harkers Island Sanitary District since 1969.

== Economy ==
Major industries on the island include fishing, boat building, tourism, and waterfowl decoy carving. In 2013, the United States Census Bureau reported 22 business establishments on Harkers Island employing 107 people. A majority of the business fall into Retail and Food Services (9) or Construction, Manufacturing, and Warehousing (9). The businesses in the latter category are almost entirely associated with boat building, boat repair, and boat storage. Many island residents are self-employed in the fishing trade. A relatively large percentage of island residents are over the age of 65 and/or retired.

Commercial fishing has always been an important component of the island economy. Historically, this trade included whaling and the hunting of dolphins. Until ice became available in the 1920s, the primary commercial catch was mullet, which was caught near the beaches of Shackleford Bank and Core Bank and salted on shore. In the late 19th century, the Core Sound area produced 80% of the salted mullet sold on the United States east coast. An ice plant was built in nearby Beaufort in 1920, and fish houses were established on the island to process fish and shellfish. Some bay areas on the north side of the island have been developed for harvesting cultured shellfish. In addition to mullet, the commercial fishing industry of Harkers Island brings in oysters, clams, shrimp, scallops, crabs, spot, croaker, trout, flounder, bluefish, and mackerel.

Tourism on Harkers Island is becoming a more important part of the local economy. The National Park Service operates the Cape Lookout National Seashore Visitors Center on Harkers Island. Ferry service from Harkers Island is one of the principal means of tourist access to Cape Lookout and the Shackleford Banks. Big-game fishing operations cater to growing demand for sport fishing in the area. Other tourism related industries include gift shops, local artists, hotels, and restaurants. Despite growth in the tourist trades and the local effort to make the island a top destination for waterfowl enthusiasts, Harkers Island continues to have some of the least developed tourist facilities on the Crystal Coast.

One of the fastest growing industries on the island is waterfowl enthusiast tourism. Founded in 1987 at the Harkers Island home of Wayne Davis, the Core Sound Decoy Carvers Guild organized the first of what would become an annual festival in December 1998. The first Core Sound Waterfowl Festival attracted 1,800 attendees. Later renamed the Core Sound Decoy Festival, the event has attracted over 10,000 tourists to Harkers Island. The Core Sound Waterfowl Museum, operated by a separate board of directors from the Carvers Guild, is a major year-round tourist attraction for the island. The museum building is a 20,000 square feet (1,900 m^{2}) structure located on property leased from the National Park Service. In addition to telling the history of local waterfowl and the traditions of decoy carving, the museum operates exhibits of local historical interest. The museum also hosts events during Waterfowl Weekend, held on the same weekend as the Decoy Festival. The festival weekend is the most important annual event for the Harkers Island tourism economy.

== Demographics ==
Historical population
Census	Pop.	Note	%±
2000	1,525		—
2010	1,207		−20.9%
2020	1,127		−6.6%
U.S. Decennial Census

As of the census of 2000, there were 1,525 people, 661 households, and 497 families residing in the CDP. The population density was 598.4 inhabitants per square mile (231.0/km^{2}). There were 1,109 housing units at an average density of 435.2 per square mile (168.0/km^{2}). The racial makeup of the CDP was 98.56% White, 0.33% Native American, 0.20% Asian, 0.07% from other races, and 0.85% from two or more races. Hispanic or Latino of any race were 0.13% of the population.

There were 661 households, out of which 21.6% had children under the age of 18 living with them, 67.9% were married couples living together, 5.6% had a female householder with no husband present, and 24.7% were non-families. 21.3% of all households were made up of individuals, and 9.7% had someone living alone who was 65 years of age or older. The average household size was 2.30 and the average family size was 2.65.

In the CDP, the population was spread out, with 15.3% under the age of 18, 6.2% from 18 to 24, 21.6% from 25 to 44, 35.1% from 45 to 64, and 21.8% who were 65 years of age or older. The median age was 49 years. For every 100 females, there were 94.8 males. For every 100 females age 18 and over, there were 95.6 males. The median income for a household in the CDP was $33,125, and the median income for a family was $35,492. Males had a median income of $37,375 versus $18,913 for females. The per capita income for the CDP was $19,790. About 13.6% of families and 15.5% of the population were below the poverty line, including 18.8% of those under age 18 and 19.1% of those age 65 or over.

== Local dialect ==
With a long history of physical and economic isolation from mainland North Carolina, residents of Harkers Island and other Outer Banks islands, such as Ocracoke, have developed a distinct dialect of English, commonly referred to as High tider, that can be traced back to that of the Elizabethan period. The dialect of Harkers Island developed in almost complete isolation for over 250 years. Harkers Island English shares features with other regional dialects of the US Atlantic coast. Pronunciation, vocabulary, and grammatical constructions can be traced to eastern and southwestern England. The dialect has survived because the community continues to depend on traditional trades, like fishing, boat building, and decoy carving, and the coastal tourism trade developed on Harkers Island much later than islands like Ocracoke.

Pronunciation in Harkers Island English can be different from the English spoken in the rest of the United States. "High tide" spoken in Harkers Island English might sound like "hoi toide", "time" sounds like "toime", "fish" is pronounced close to "feesh", "fire" sounds like "far", and "cape" is pronounced "ca'e". Words with "oi" substitute the pronunciation "er": "Toilet" sounds like "terlet". Words with a short "a" substitute schwa: "crabs" become "crebs". Words beginning with "i" frequently receive a prefix aspirated "h": "it" becomes "hit". Words ending in a vowel are frequently suffixed with an "r". The traditional word for a porch across the width of a building, "piazza", loses the "t" of the Italian pronunciation and becomes "poyzer".

Thus, "Hit's so hot the blue crebs hev come up on the poyzer to git in the shade," and "hit was so rough there were whiteceps in the terlet." Another phrase is "The ersters hev arroived;" the large fish with a prominent dorsal fin is a "sherk". The island dialect has also retained anachronistic vocabulary in regular usage. Some examples include "mommick", meaning to frustrate or bother, "yethy", describing stale or unpleasant odor, and "nicket", meaning a pinch of something used as in cooking. The islanders have also developed unique local words used in regular conversation, including "dingbatter" to refer to a visitor or recent arrival to the island, and "dit-dot," a term developed from a joke about Morse code, and used to describe any visitor to the island who has difficulty understanding the local dialect.

As many as 500 islanders on Harkers Island are directly descended from the Harkers Island and Outer Banks settlers that developed this distinct dialect. Linguists from North Carolina State University, East Carolina University, and other academic institutions continue to conduct research on the island dialect.

== Education ==
It is within the Carteret County Schools district. Residents are zoned to Harkers Island Elementary School, Down East Middle School @ Smyrna, and East Carteret High School.

== Religion ==
In 2006, Harkers Island had eight Christian churches. Established churches and religious organizations on Harkers Island include the Church of Jesus Christ of Latter-day Saints, Free Grace Wesleyan Church, Grace Holiness Church, Harkers Island Pentecostal Holiness Church, Harkers Island United Methodist Church, Huggins Memorial Baptist Church Parsonage, the Lighthouse Chapel (non-denominational), and the Refuge Fellowship Church (non-denominational).

== See also ==
- High tider
