= Raleigh Bay =

Coordinates: 35.023°N 75.988°W

Raleigh Bay is an indentation of the North Carolina coast, between Cape Lookout in the south and Cape Hatteras in the north. The coastline of the bay is approximately 75 miles (121 km) long, and consists of barrier islands, including Ocracoke Island. It is part of the open Atlantic Ocean and affords no protection from oceanic swells.
