= Diamond City, North Carolina =

Abandoned village in North Carolina, US

Coordinates: 34.645°N 76.541°W

Diamond City was a settlement on the eastern end of Shackleford Banks, in Carteret County, North Carolina, United States. Shackleford Banks is the westernmost island of the Cape Lookout National Seashore, which extends for 56 miles from Beaufort Inlet to Ocracoke Inlet. Originally named Lookout Woods, the title was later renamed to symbolize the black diamonds painted on the Light Station in Shackleford Banks.

In the late 19th century, many small settlements were created along the Shackleford Banks. During this period, Bell's Island, Wade's Shore, Mullet Pond, and Diamond City were created; Diamond City being one of the largest and most notable settlements. Settlers in Diamond City and Shackleford Banks often were referred to as C'ae Bankers. The name was derived from the word Cape (with the removal of the letter p). Due to the San Ciriaco hurricane that struck in August 1899, the approximately 500 residents of the settlement and island decided to move. The last of the residents had left by 1902, and even relocated houses to nearby places such as Harkers Island, Salter Path, and Morehead City.

There are no bridges from the mainland to the site where Diamond City was located or to any other part of the Cape Lookout National Seashore. Visitors must ride a private boat or a passenger ferry to reach the undeveloped Shackleford Banks site. Its isolation caused settlers to use the lands natural materials to meet their needs. Homes were made from shipwreck scraps, mattresses were stuffed with dried seaweed, and oil was rendered from whale blubber.

== Whaling ==
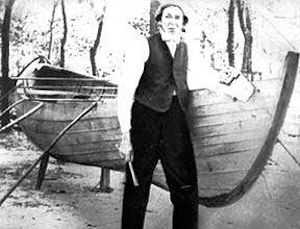
Photo of Devine Guthrie, a whaler and boat builder from Diamond City, NC (circa 1880-1890s).

Cape Lookout and Shackleford Banks in North Carolina were the sites of the only shore-based whaling stations in the Eastern United States south of New York. These locations were ideal for whaling because they were close to the Gulf Stream, which was near the migration path of North Atlantic right and sperm whales. Between Cape Lookout and Shackleford Banks was the settlement of Diamond City, the largest town in the area, with a permanent population of around 500.
