= Shackleford Banks =

"a place to be at ease with what runs wild in you." - unknown

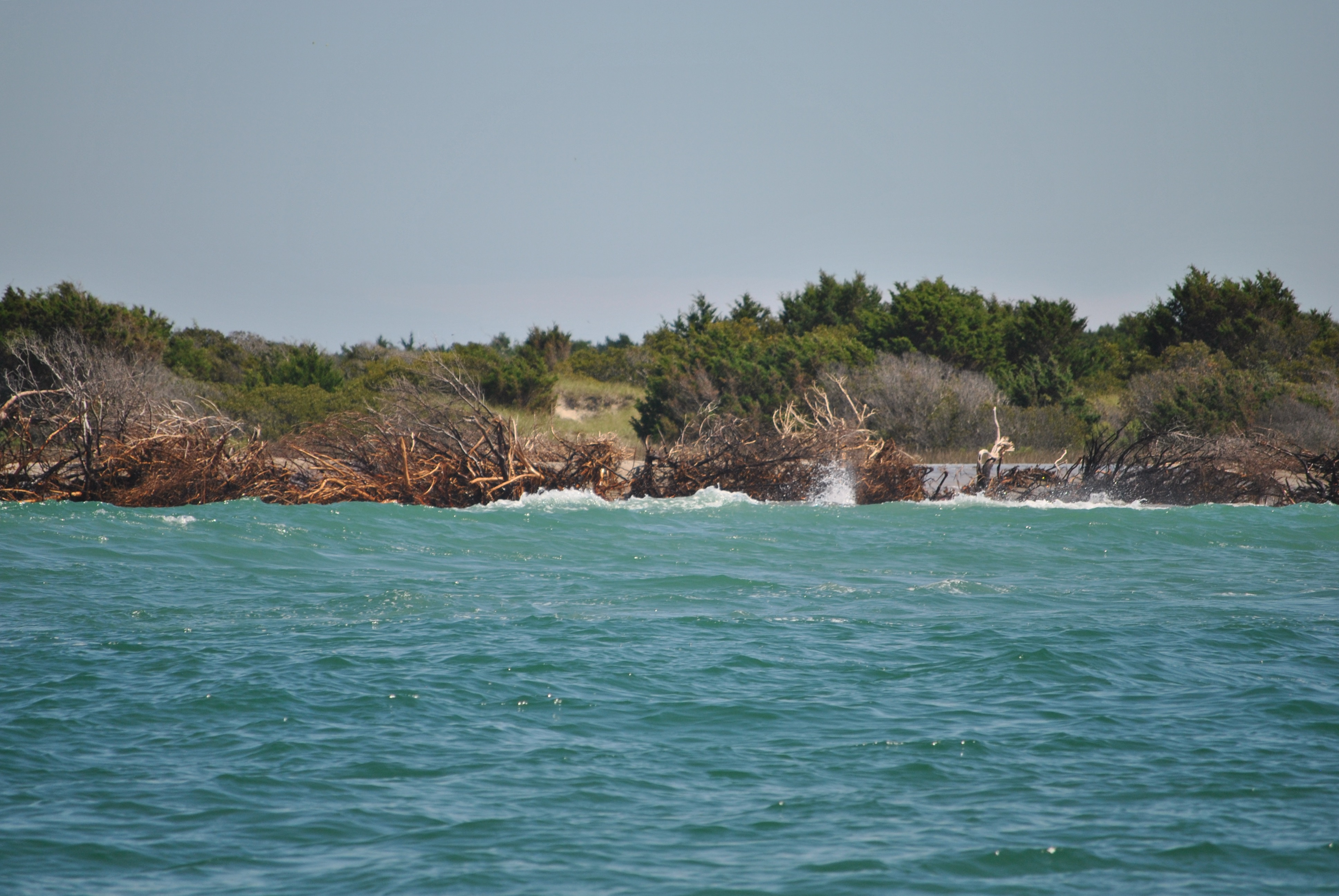
- Shackleford Banks in 2016

- Location within North Carolina

Geography
- Coordinates: 34°39′54″N 76°35′16″W

Administration
- U.S.
- County: Carteret County, North Carolina

Demographics
- Population: 0

Additional information
- Official website: www.outerbanks.com/shackleford-banks.html

Shackleford Banks is a barrier island system on the coast of Carteret County, North Carolina. It contains a herd of feral horses, scallop, crabs and various sea animals, including summer nesting by loggerhead turtles. It is a tourist and beach camping site.

Shackleford Banks is located near Harkers Island, North Carolina, Beaufort, North Carolina, and Fort Macon State Park, and is a part of the Cape Lookout National Seashore.

== History ==
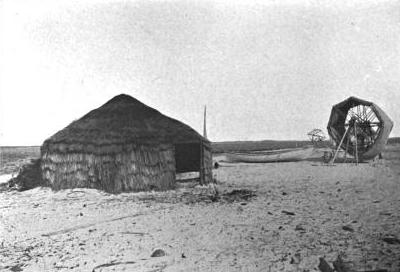
Camp for mullet fishermen on Shackleford Banks, 1907

In 1713, the Virginia planter John Shackleford acquired several large tracts of land in Bath County, which included Shackleford Banks. Among these was a grant of land containing 7,000 acres (28 km^{2}). This tract on the early maps was known as Sea Banks. It was then, and is now, in Carteret County, in North Carolina's Outer Banks.

When John Shackleford first acquired his tract at Shackleford Banks, the island was known as "Cart Island", most likely after Carteret County. The last of the Virginia Shacklefords apparently sold their generations-old holding in 1805, when James Shackleford (the spelling of the name varies) of Carteret County sold his holdings on the Banks to Roger and John Shackleford of Georgetown, South Carolina, where a branch of the Virginia Shackleford family had eventually migrated. That deed specified "a certain parcel of land on Old Topsail Inlet, beginning at Whaler's Creek on said Banks and across to the sea; thence back to Old Topsail Inlet". (The Shackleford family traced their Virginia origins to the village of Shacklefords in King and Queen County.)

John Shackleford's garrison is listed in Colonial Records, January 19, 1712. "John Shackleford at the garrison at the Shackleford Plantation to be allowed to plant Corne on said Plantation, plant, tend and gather Corne during time they keep a garrison there." This shows troops were stationed at the garrison and the soil was tillable on the Banks during 1712. He was appointed to see "Every ship drawing eight feet of water anchoring at Shackleford Banks to charge three shillings six pence per foot".

In 1886, after a ship named the Chrissie Wright was wrecked on Shackelford Banks, some of the bodies of the drowned crew were buried in Beaufort.

Shackleford Banks once had permanent residents. The now-abandoned settlement of Diamond City was located on the Banks, but the last occupants had relocated by 1902.

Until 1933, Shackleford Banks was connected to the Core Banks. Barden Inlet was opened by the 1933 Outer Banks Hurricane, separating the Shackleford Banks from South Core Banks.

== Today ==
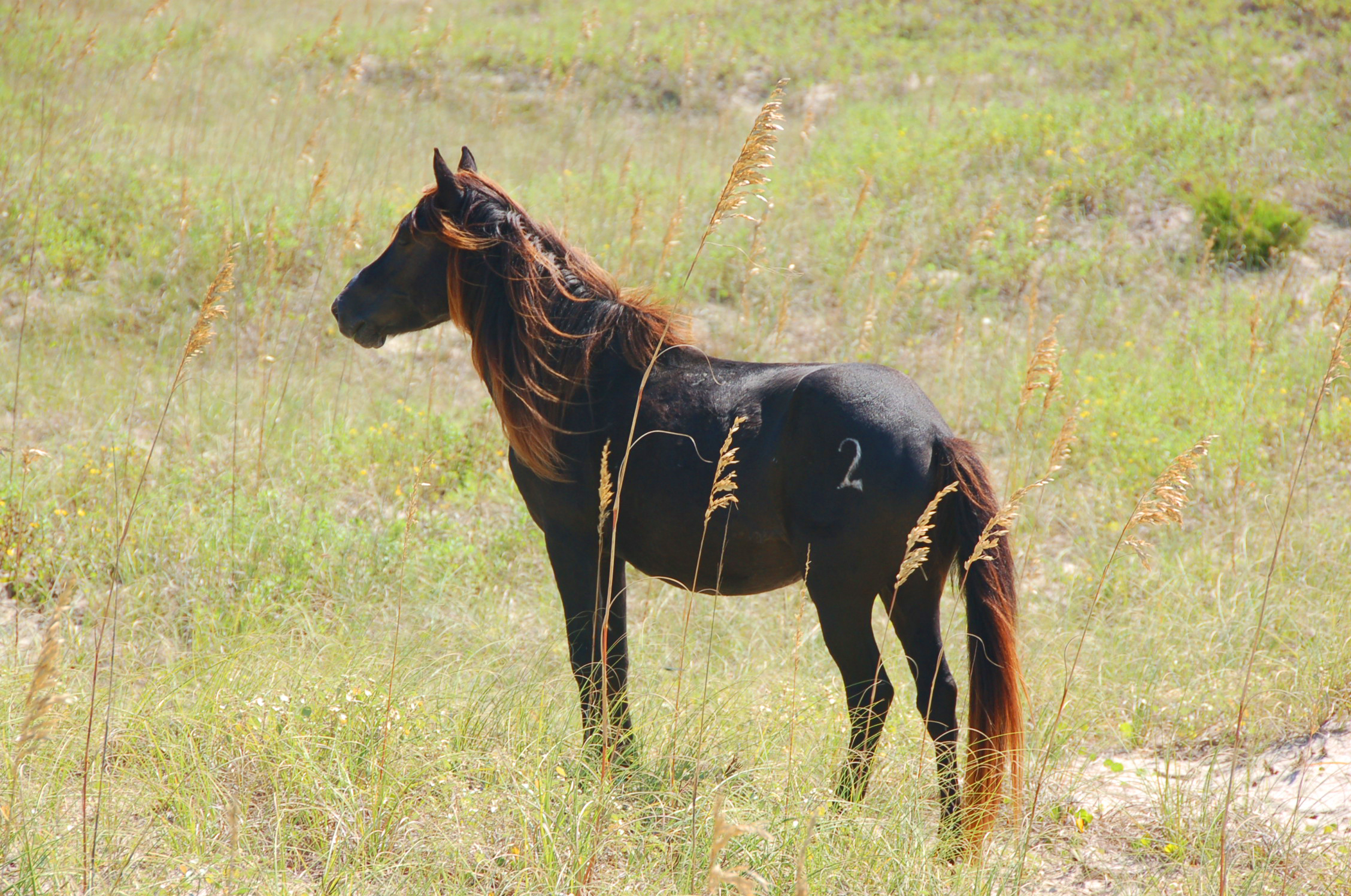
A feral horse on Shackleford.

Shackleford Banks is known for the feral horses that roam there. The National Park Service closely monitors and studies these "Banker horses". They provide a glimpse into how horses lived in the wild before their domestication. The manner in which the horses arrived is still a mystery; legend has it that these horses are descendants of Spanish Mustangs that survived a shipwreck. Genetic analysis suggests that the Shackleford Banks population is similar to other American horse populations established from the Iberian peninsula.

Visitors can take a ferry to the island from Morehead City, Beaufort, or Harkers Island. Since the horses roam the island, visitors may have to search for them. The National Park Service recommends visitors stay at least 50 feet away from the horses for safety, as they are wild animals.

Preceded by Cape Lookout; Outer Banks	Beaches of Southeastern North Carolina	Succeeded by Fort Macon
