= Eight Mile Rock =

Town in Grand Bahama, Bahamas

Coordinates: 26.516050°N 78.758940°W

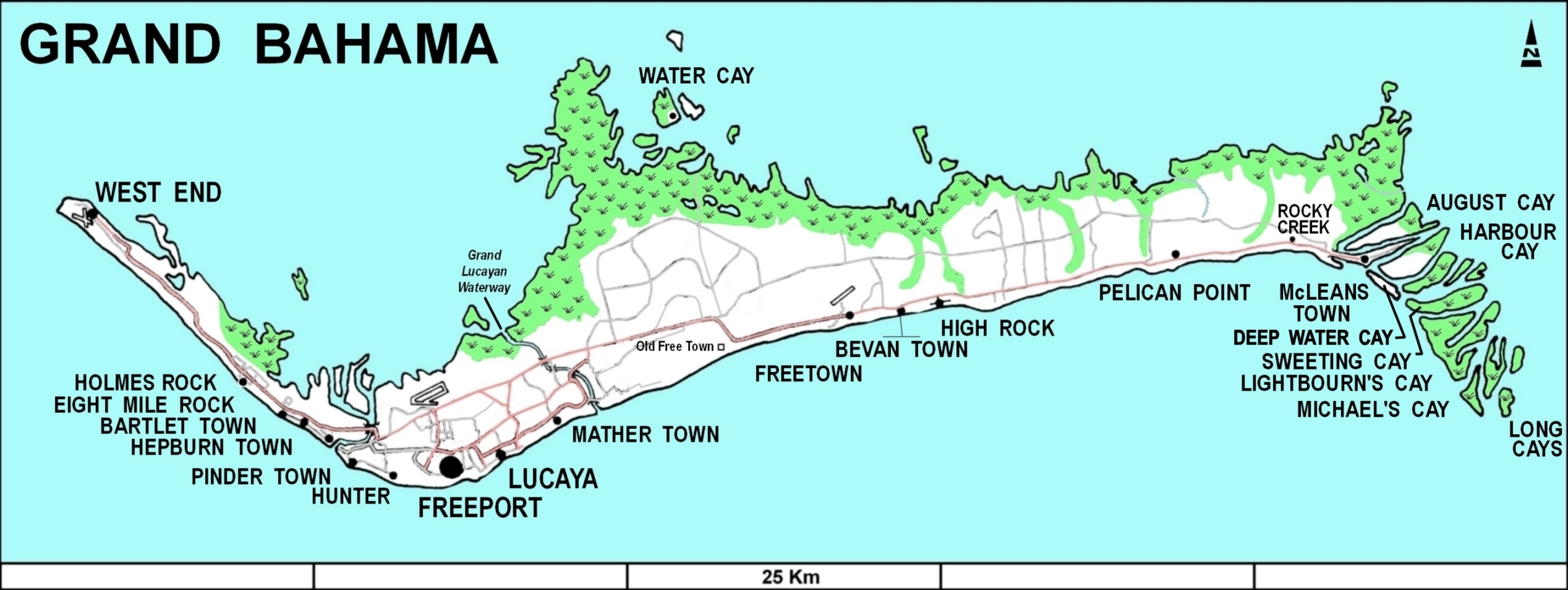

Eight Mile Rock is one of the Grand Bahama island's oldest communities. Eight Mile Rock consist of 11 subsettlements: Hepburn Town, Bartlett Hill, Hanna Hill, Pinedale, Martin Town, Russell Town, Jones Town, Seagrape. Eight Mile Rock is 14 miles from Freeport and the largest settlement outside of Freeport. This area obtained its name from the eight miles of solid rock found along its shore line. Its geographical coordinates are 26° 31' 0" North, 78° 47' 0" West.
