= Onslow Bay =

Atlantic Ocean bay in North Carolina, US

Coordinates: 34.5984286°N 77.2002745°W

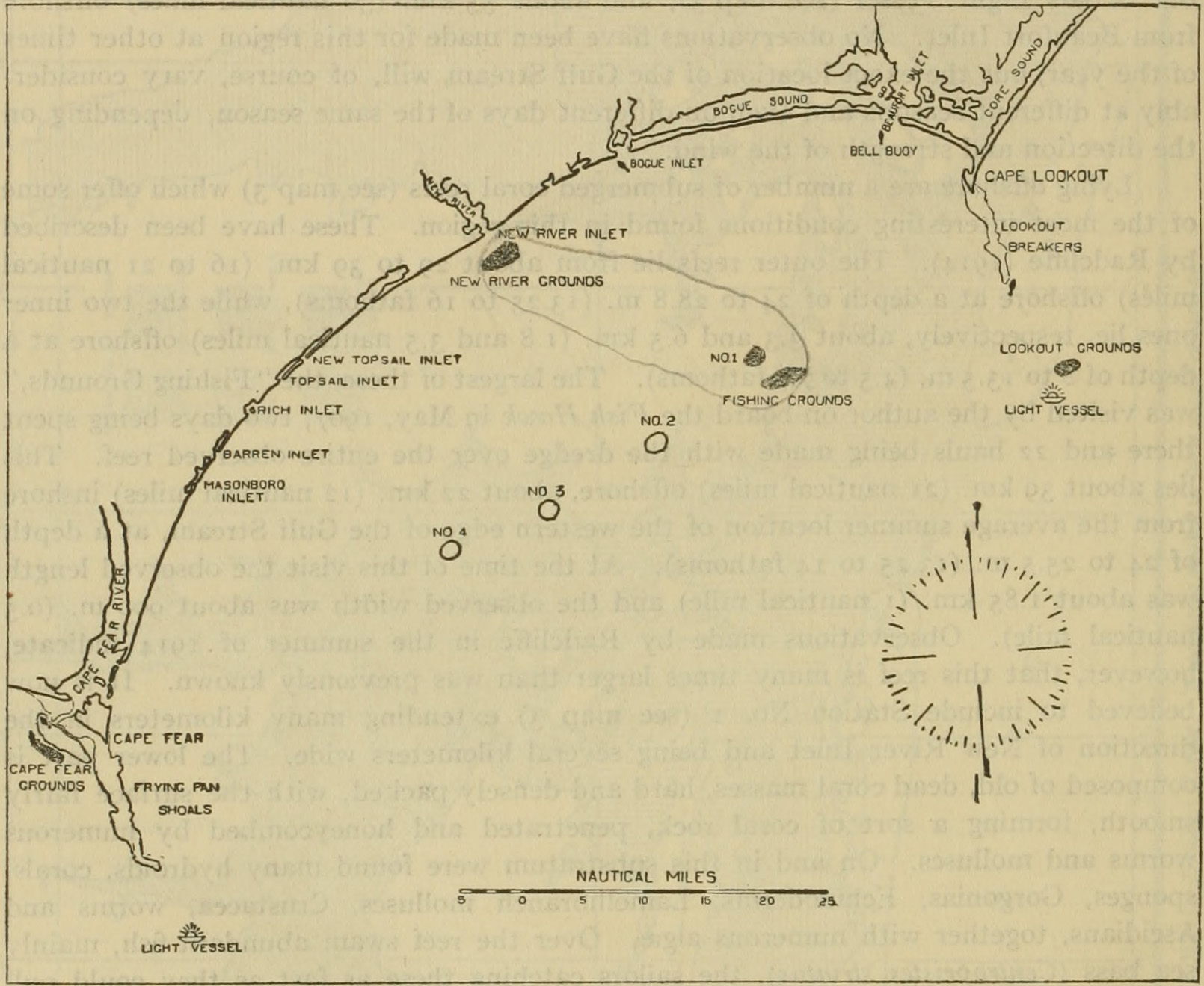
Map of Onslow Bay.

Onslow Bay is an indentation of the North Carolina coast, between Cape Fear in the south and Cape Lookout in the north. Thirteen barrier islands form the shore of the bay. It is part of the open Atlantic Ocean and affords no protection from oceanic swells.
