= Cape Lookout (North Carolina) =

Cape in North Carolina, United States

Coordinates: 34°36′19″N 76°32′10″W

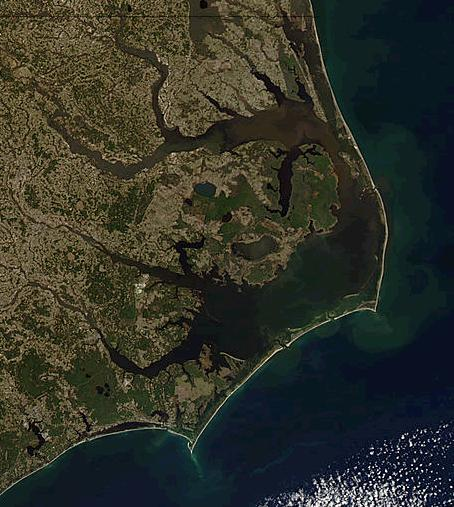
Cape Lookout appears left of center near the bottom of this view of North Carolina Coast.

Cape Lookout is the southern point of the Core Banks, one of the natural barrier islands on the Atlantic coast of North Carolina. It delimits Onslow Bay to the west from Raleigh Bay to the east. Core Banks and Shackleford Banks have been designated as parts of the Cape Lookout National Seashore.

Part of Carteret County, the cape sits 11 miles (18 km) southeast of Beaufort. It is one of the state's three major capes, along with Cape Hatteras to the north and Cape Fear to the south.

The 163-foot (50 m) tall Cape Lookout Lighthouse sits about three miles northeast of the cape's point.

== Climate ==
According to the Trewartha climate classification system, Cape Lookout, North Carolina has a humid subtropical climate with hot and humid summers, cool winters and year-around precipitation (Cfak). Cfak climates are characterized by all months having an average mean temperature > 32.0 °F (> 0.0 °C), at least eight months with an average mean temperature ≥ 50.0 °F (≥ 10.0 °C), at least one month with an average mean temperature ≥ 71.6 °F (≥ 22.0 °C) and no significant precipitation difference between seasons. During the summer months in Cape Lookout, a cooling afternoon sea breeze is present on most days, but episodes of extreme heat and humidity can occur with heat index values ≥ 100 °F (≥ 38 °C). Cape Lookout is prone to hurricane strikes, particularly during the Atlantic hurricane season which extends from June 1 through November 30, sharply peaking from late August through September. During the winter months, episodes of cold and wind can occur with wind chill values < 10 °F (< -12 °C). The plant hardiness zone in Cape Lookout is 9a with an average annual extreme minimum air temperature of 20°F. The average seasonal (Dec-Mar) snowfall total is < 2 inches (< 5 cm), and the average annual peak in nor'easter activity is in February.

Climate data for Cape Lookout, NC (1981-2010 Averages)
| Month | Jan | Feb | Mar | Apr | May | Jun | Jul | Aug | Sep | Oct | Nov | Dec | Year |
|---|---|---|---|---|---|---|---|---|---|---|---|---|---|
| Mean daily maximum °F (°C) | 52.6 (11.4) | 54.1 (12.3) | 59.0 (15.0) | 65.8 (18.8) | 72.8 (22.7) | 80.0 (26.7) | 83.1 (28.4) | 82.6 (28.1) | 79.3 (26.3) | 71.6 (22.0) | 64.2 (17.9) | 56.0 (13.3) | 68.5 (20.3) |
| Daily mean °F (°C) | 46.4 (8.0) | 48.0 (8.9) | 53.2 (11.8) | 60.6 (15.9) | 68.1 (20.1) | 76.0 (24.4) | 79.5 (26.4) | 78.8 (26.0) | 75.0 (23.9) | 66.1 (18.9) | 57.9 (14.4) | 49.7 (9.8) | 63.3 (17.4) |
| Mean daily minimum °F (°C) | 40.1 (4.5) | 41.8 (5.4) | 47.3 (8.5) | 55.4 (13.0) | 63.4 (17.4) | 71.9 (22.2) | 75.9 (24.4) | 75.0 (23.9) | 70.8 (21.6) | 60.5 (15.8) | 51.6 (10.9) | 43.4 (6.3) | 58.2 (14.6) |
| Average precipitation inches (mm) | 4.52 (115) | 3.71 (94) | 4.42 (112) | 3.31 (84) | 4.27 (108) | 4.52 (115) | 6.02 (153) | 7.26 (184) | 6.71 (170) | 4.48 (114) | 4.05 (103) | 4.01 (102) | 57.28 (1,455) |
| Average relative humidity (%) | 74.7 | 75.1 | 74.5 | 74.9 | 76.7 | 79.0 | 82.2 | 79.7 | 78.9 | 75.1 | 77.5 | 75.9 | 77.0 |
| Average dew point °F (°C) | 38.8 (3.8) | 40.5 (4.7) | 45.3 (7.4) | 52.6 (11.4) | 60.5 (15.8) | 69.0 (20.6) | 73.6 (23.1) | 72.0 (22.2) | 68.0 (20.0) | 58.0 (14.4) | 50.9 (10.5) | 42.4 (5.8) | 56.0 (13.3) |
Source: PRISM

Climate data for Cape Hatteras, NC Ocean Water Temperature (72 NE Cape Lookout)
| Month | Jan | Feb | Mar | Apr | May | Jun | Jul | Aug | Sep | Oct | Nov | Dec | Year |
|---|---|---|---|---|---|---|---|---|---|---|---|---|---|
| Daily mean °F (°C) | 49 (9) | 46 (8) | 52 (11) | 59 (15) | 68 (20) | 74 (23) | 78 (26) | 80 (27) | 77 (25) | 70 (21) | 58 (14) | 55 (13) | 64 (18) |
Source: NOAA

== Ecology ==
According to the A. W. Kuchler U.S. potential natural vegetation types, Cape Lookout, North Carolina would have a dominant vegetation type of Live oak/Sea Oats Uniola paniculata (90) with a dominant vegetation form of Coastal Prairie (20).

| Preceded by Core Banks | Beaches of The Outer Banks | Succeeded by Shackleford Banks; Southeastern North Carolina Beaches |
