= Cape Lookout Village Historic District =

Historic district in North Carolina, United States

- U.S. National Register of Historic Places
- U.S. Historic district
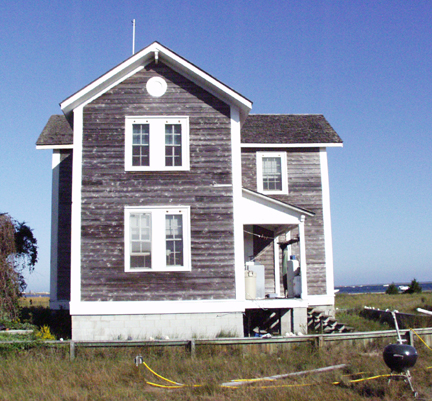
- Keeper's Dwelling, Cape Lookout Village

- Location within North Carolina Location within the United States
- Location: Cape Lookout from Lighthouse to Coast Guard St.; bounded by ocean and a concrete road, and concrete road across Bight, Core Banks, North Carolina
- Coordinates: 34°36′45″N 76°32′06″W
- Area: 810 acres (330 ha)
- Built: 1859
- Built by: Shull, W.J.B.
- Architectural style: Queen Anne, Bungalow/craftsman, et al.
- NRHP reference No.: 00000692
- Added to NRHP: June 3, 2000

Cape Lookout Village Historic District is a national historic district located near Core Banks, Carteret County, North Carolina. It encompasses 20 contributing buildings 1 contributing site, and 6 contributing structures in Cape Lookout Village. The buildings include notable examples of Queen Anne and Bungalow / American Craftsman style architecture. The district includes two government complexes: the Cape Lookout Lighthouse Station and the Cape Lookout Coast Guard Station. In addition, 14 buildings, a long dock, and the circulation network, as well as the landscape in which these lie, compose the district. The buildings include the Life Saving Station (1888) and Boathouse, the Keeper's Quarters (1907), Luther Guthrie House, Gaskill-Guthrie House, Seifert-Davis House (Coca-Cola House), Baker-Holderness House (Casablanca, c. 1930), the Bryant House, and the Carrie Arendell Davis House.

It was listed on the National Register of Historic Places in 2000.
