= Cape Lookout Coast Guard Station =

Historic district in North Carolina, United States

- U.S. National Register of Historic Places
- U.S. Historic district
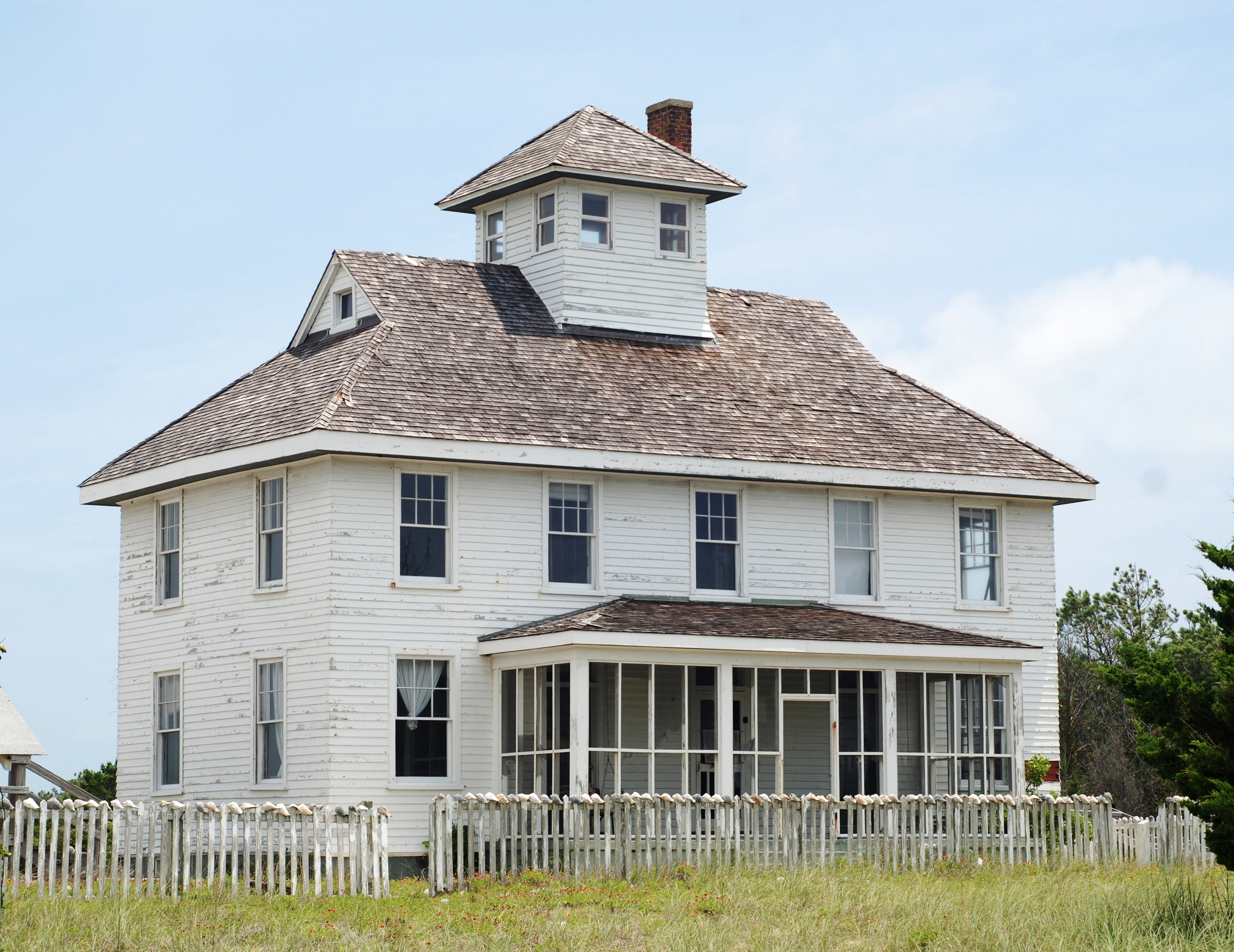

- Location within North Carolina Location within the United States
- Location: Cape Lookout National Seashore, Carteret County, North Carolina, USA
- Nearest city: Beaufort, North Carolina
- Coordinates: 34°36′11″N 76°32′17″W
- Built: 1916
- Architectural style: Classical Revival
- NRHP reference No.: 88003436
- Added to NRHP: February 1, 1989

The Cape Lookout Coast Guard Station is located on the Core Banks of North Carolina between Cape Lookout and the Cape Lookout Light. The station was built as a lifeboat station beginning in 1916 and comprises a complex of several frame buildings. The chief structure is the Main Station, a neo-colonial building with a central cupola or watchtower. It is surrounded by a galley, or messhall, equipment buildings, cisterns and similar support structures. Two similar stations were built at Hatteras Inlet and Cape Fear, which have not survived. The Cape Lookout station was chiefly responsible for providing rescue services in the Cape Lookout Shoals, which extend ten miles into the Atlantic Ocean and represent a significant hazard to coastwise shipping. The Cape Lookout station operated until 1982, and is now under the care of Cape Lookout National Seashore.

The Station's two original buildings now regularly house students from North Carolina's universities assisting in dolphin and sea turtle research. The buildings are run by a single windmill and two solar panel arrays.

It was listed on the National Register of Historic Places in 1989.

== Gallery ==
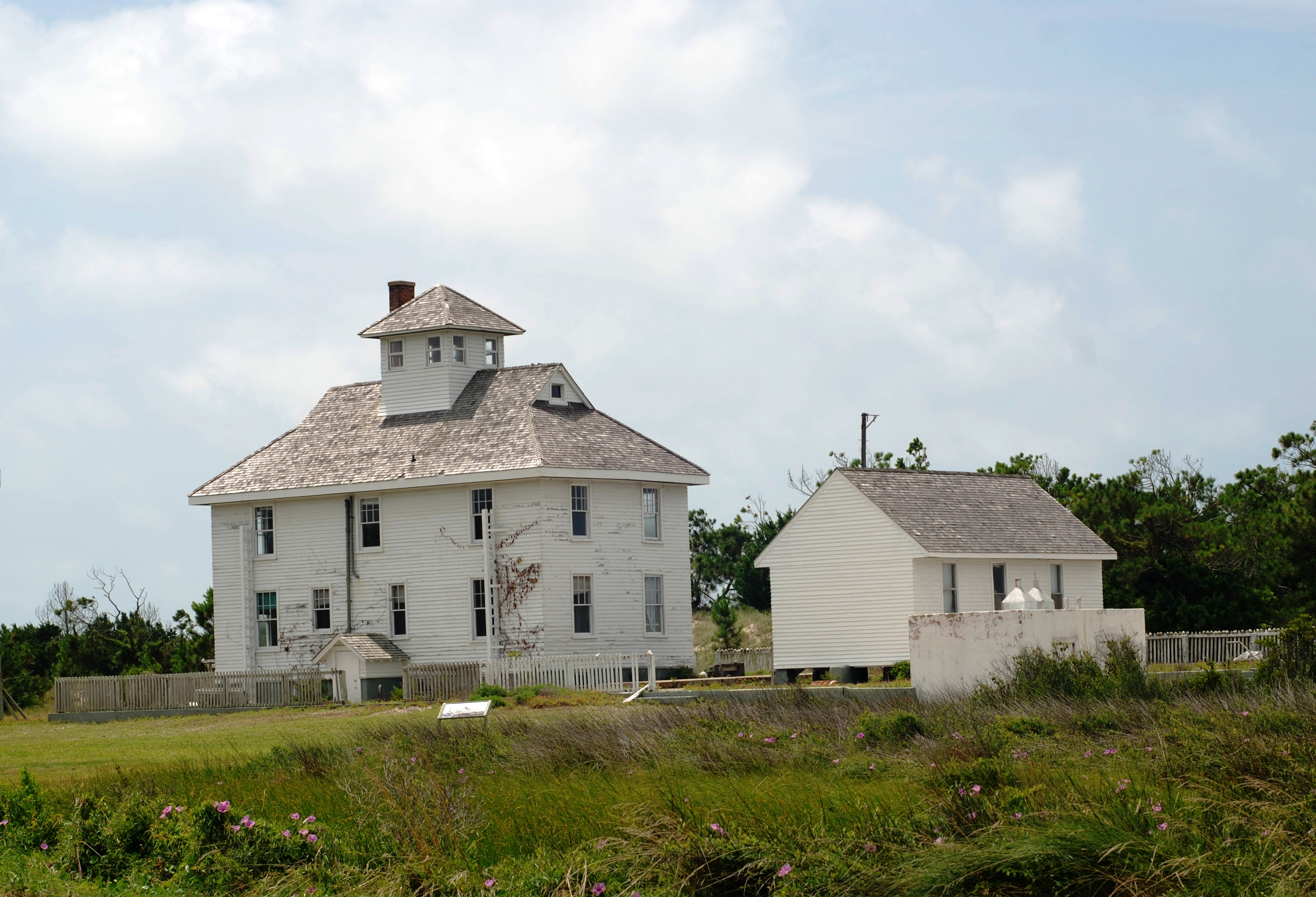
Cape Lookout Coast Guard Station

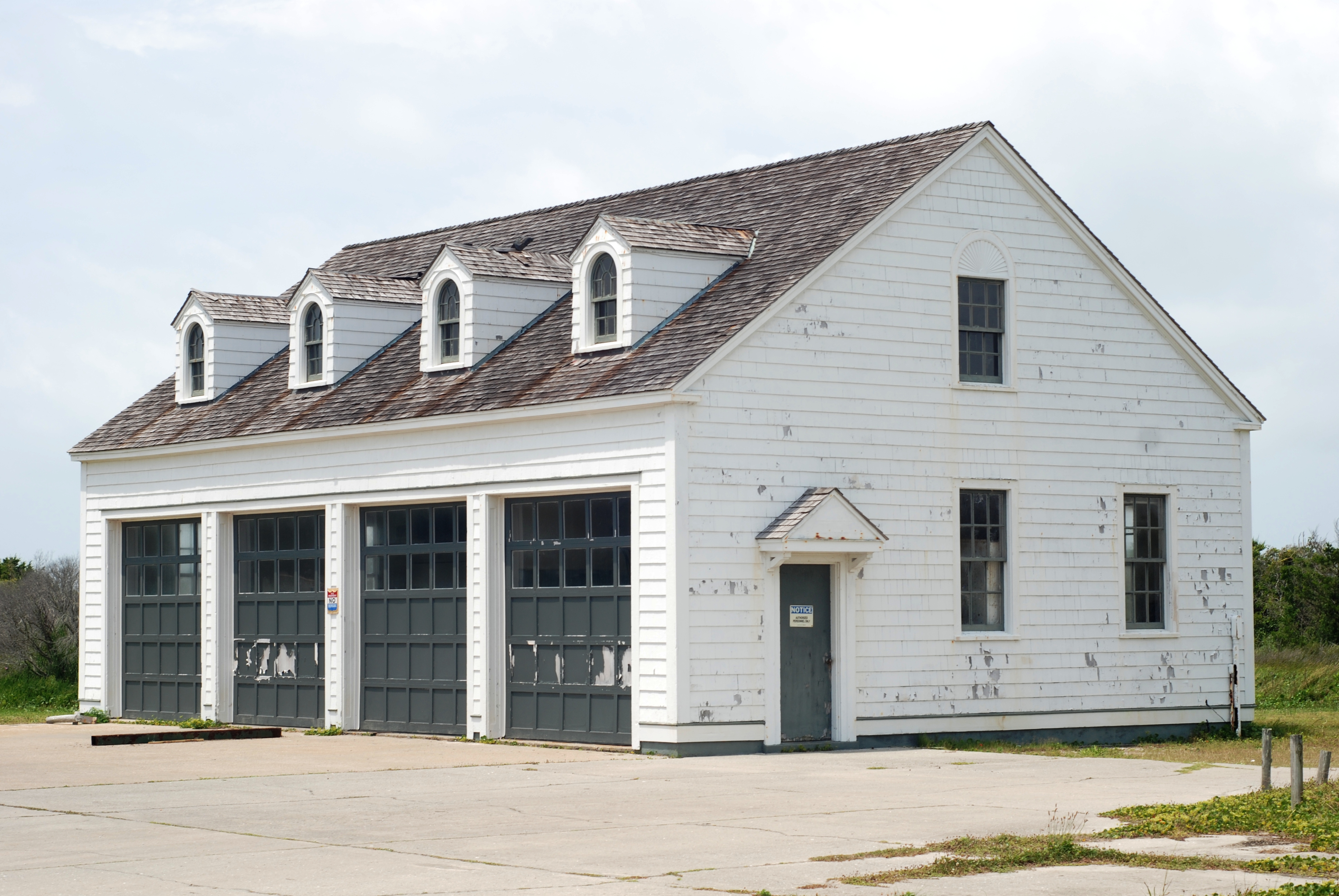
Cape Lookout Coast Guard Station Equipment Building
