= Drum Inlet =

Coordinates: 34°51′01″N 76°19′17″W

Drum Inlet and Ophelia Inlet are inlets of the Outer Banks in the U.S. state of North Carolina. They connect the Core Sound with the Atlantic Ocean and separate North Core Banks from South Core Banks. The exact inlet locations and names have changed with time, as new inlets open, merge, or close. Conversationally, the inlet or inlets between mile 19 and 23, as measured from Ocracoke Inlet, are typically called Drum Inlet even when, geologically, they have other names.

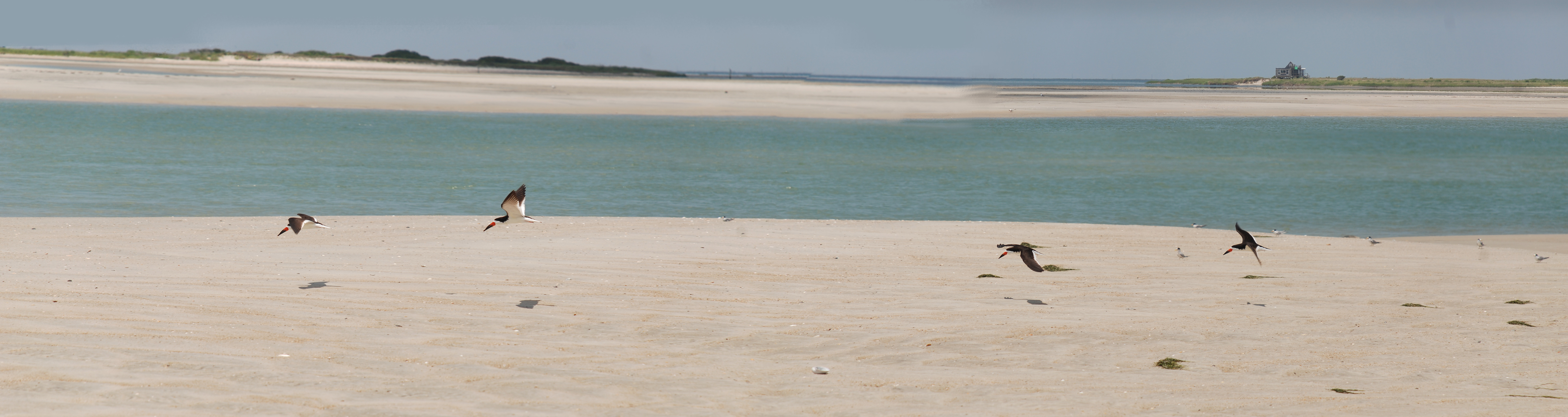
New Old Drum Inlet in 2014: time lapse photograph of a black skimmer (Rynchops niger) with a house on the Dump Island in the background

Drum Inlet initially opened at mile 19 in about 1899, but closed naturally by 1919. It reopened during the 1933 Outer Banks Hurricane, but closed by 1971 when the U.S. Army Corps of Engineers dredged and blasted a new inlet, called New Drum Inlet, at mile 22. The purpose of New Drum Inlet was to allow commercial fishing vessels to access ocean from several small coastal communities; however, the inlet shoaled before any commercial vessels used it. In August 1999 Hurricane Dennis reopened the original Drum Inlet, at mile 19, which become New Old Drum Inlet, but it has again closed around 2008. In September 2005 Ophelia Inlet was opened by Hurricane Ophelia, just south of New Drum Inlet, at mile 23. Over the winter of 2008-2009, all of Drum and New Drum inlets shoaled and closed up, leaving only Ophelia Inlet. In September 2011, Hurricane Irene reopened New Drum (mile 22) and Old Drum inlets (mile 19) and widened Ophelia Inlet (mile 23).

Part of the North Core Island between Old Drum Inlet (mile 19) and New Drum Inlet / Ophelia Inlet (at mile 22/23) is referred to as Middle Core Island in the years when Old Drum Inlet is open. Similarly small section of Core Bank between New Drum Inlet and Ophelia Inlet, which existed in years 2005 to 2008, was referred to as New Core Island.
