= Core Banks, North Carolina =

Barrier islands in North Carolina, US

Core Banks
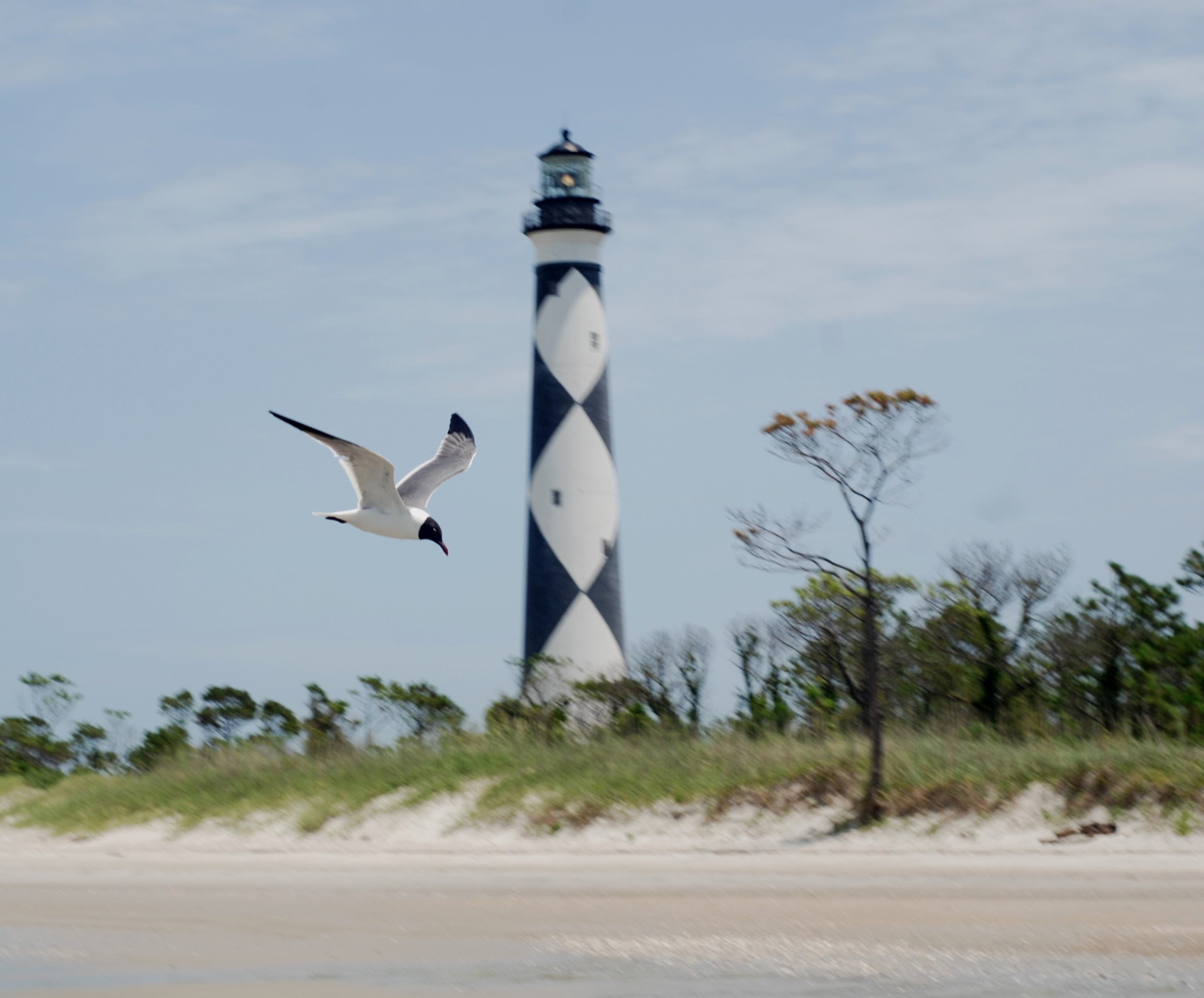
- Cape Lookout Lighthouse

- Location within North Carolina

Geography
- Location: Southern Outer Banks, Carteret County, North Carolina, United States
- Coordinates: 34°42′23″N 76°27′32″W

Administration
- United States
- Nearest city: Harkers Island, NC
- Governing body: National Park Service

Demographics
- Population: no permanent population
- Pop. density: 0/km^{2} (0/sq mi)

The Core Banks are barrier islands in North Carolina, part of the Cape Lookout National Seashore. Named after the Coree tribe, they extend from Ocracoke Inlet to Cape Lookout, and consist of two low-relief narrow islands, North Core Banks and South Core Banks, and, since September 2011, two smaller islands. New Drum Inlet, Old Drum Inlet and Ophelia Inlet now separate the islands. The Core Banks are now uninhabited. However, Portsmouth, at the north end of the North Core Banks, was once a substantial port, and Cape Lookout Village, about one and half miles south of the Cape Lookout Lighthouse, contains the historic Lookout Life-Saving Station, a U.S. Coast Guard Station, and several island homes.

== Access ==
Islands can be reached by two vehicle ferries. One ferry crosses Core Sound from Atlantic to North Core Banks, and another crosses the sound from Davis to South Core Banks. There are no roads on the islands: vehicles use the beach and four wheel drive tracks. Passenger ferries also take tourists from Harkers Island to the Cape Lookout area at the south end of South Core Banks.

Portsmouth Island, on which Portsmouth Village stands, is a tidal island accessible from North Core Banks at most states of the tide.

== History ==
The Cape Lookout Coast Guard Station, Cape Lookout Light Station, and Cape Lookout Village Historic District are listed on the National Register of Historic Places.

== Geography ==
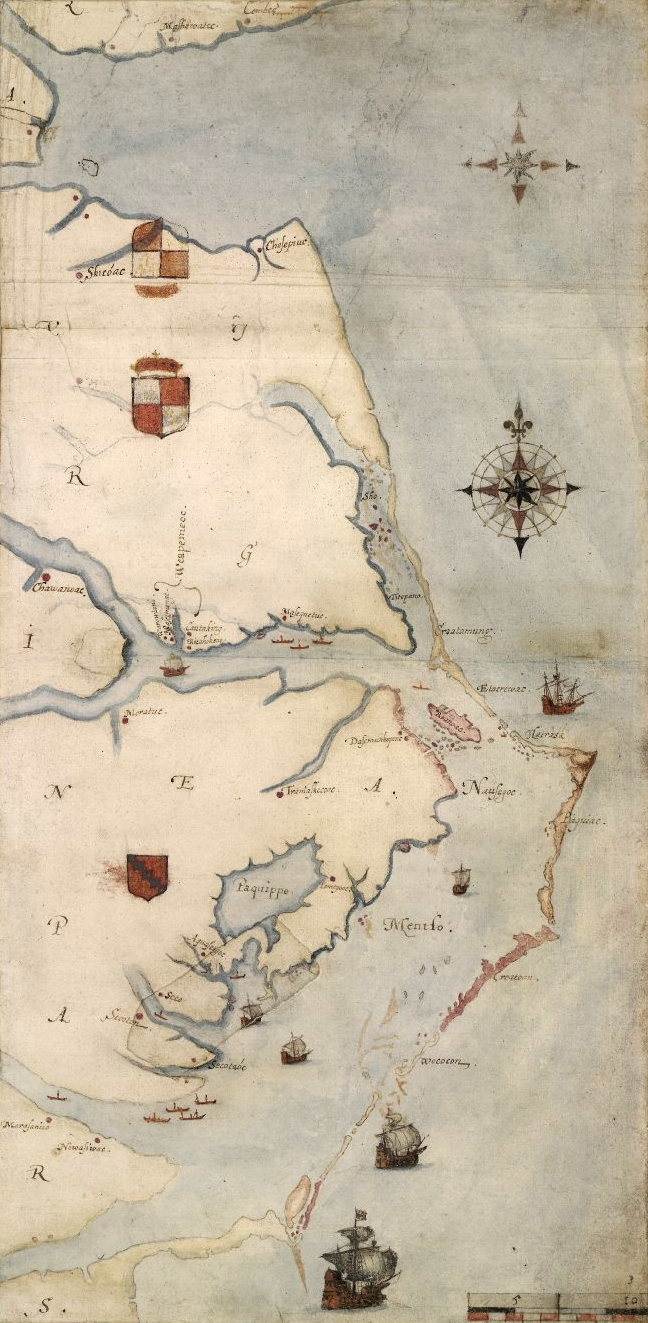
1584 map by John White showing Core Banks.

The geography of the Core Banks has changed since the mid 19th century. At that time South Core Banks was connected to the Shackleford Banks. Over the years inlets have closed and opened in the barrier islands. From north to south these inlets have been Whalebone Inlet, now closed, which separated Portsmouth Island from the Core Banks, Swash Inlet (closed), Old Drum Inlet (closed in 1971 and reopened by Hurricane Irene in 2011), New Drum Inlet (opened by the U.S. Army Corps of Engineers in 1971), Ophelia Inlet (opened by Hurricane Ophelia in 2005), Cedar Inlet (closed) and Barden Inlet (opened by a hurricane in 1933, separating Shackleford Banks from South Core Banks).

From northeast to southwest, the islands are located in the Townships of Portsmouth, Atlantic, Sea Level, Stacy, Davis, Smyrna, and Harkers Island, all in Carteret County.

== Climate ==
According to the Trewartha climate classification system, Core Banks, North Carolina has a humid subtropical climate with hot and humid summers, cool winters and year-around precipitation (Cfak). Cfak climates are characterized by all months having an average mean temperature > 32.0 °F (> 0.0 °C), at least eight months with an average mean temperature ≥ 50.0 °F (≥ 10.0 °C), at least one month with an average mean temperature ≥ 71.6 °F (≥ 22.0 °C) and no significant precipitation difference between seasons. During the summer months in Core Banks, a cooling afternoon sea breeze is present on most days, but episodes of extreme heat and humidity can occur with heat index values ≥ 100 °F (≥ 38 °C). Core Banks is prone to hurricane strikes, particularly during the Atlantic hurricane season which extends from June 1 through November 30, sharply peaking from late August through September. During the winter months, episodes of cold and wind can occur with wind chill values < 10 °F (< -12 °C). The plant hardiness zone in Core Banks is 8b with an average annual extreme minimum air temperature of 15.3 °F (-9.3 °C). The average seasonal (Dec-Mar) snowfall total is < 2 inches (< 5 cm), and the average annual peak in nor'easter activity is in February.

Climate data for Core Banks, NC (1981-2010 Averages)
Month	Jan	Feb	Mar	Apr	May	Jun	Jul	Aug	Sep	Oct	Nov	Dec	Year
Mean daily maximum °F (°C)	52.8 (11.6)	54.4 (12.4)	60.0 (15.6)	67.1 (19.5)	74.1 (23.4)	80.9 (27.2)	83.9 (28.8)	83.2 (28.4)	79.7 (26.5)	71.9 (22.2)	64.5 (18.1)	56.2 (13.4)	69.1 (20.6)
Daily mean °F (°C)	45.6 (7.6)	47.4 (8.6)	53.1 (11.7)	60.7 (15.9)	68.4 (20.2)	76.1 (24.5)	79.4 (26.3)	78.5 (25.8)	74.5 (23.6)	65.4 (18.6)	57.4 (14.1)	49.1 (9.5)	63.0 (17.2)
Mean daily minimum °F (°C)	38.5 (3.6)	40.5 (4.7)	46.2 (7.9)	54.4 (12.4)	62.6 (17.0)	71.2 (21.8)	74.9 (23.8)	73.8 (23.2)	69.4 (20.8)	59.0 (15.0)	50.3 (10.2)	41.9 (5.5)	57.0 (13.9)
Average precipitation inches (mm)	4.54 (115)	3.68 (93)	4.44 (113)	3.34 (85)	4.20 (107)	4.45 (113)	5.98 (152)	7.25 (184)	6.59 (167)	4.51 (115)	4.05 (103)	4.01 (102)	57.04 (1,449)
Average relative humidity (%)	72.9	73.6	72.0	72.7	74.8	77.9	80.8	79.2	78.3	75.4	76.0	74.4	75.7
Average dew point °F (°C)	37.4 (3.0)	39.4 (4.1)	44.3 (6.8)	51.9 (11.1)	60.1 (15.6)	68.7 (20.4)	73.0 (22.8)	71.5 (21.9)	67.3 (19.6)	57.4 (14.1)	49.9 (9.9)	41.3 (5.2)	55.3 (12.9)
Source: PRISM

Climate data for Cape Hatteras, NC Ocean Water Temperature (64 NE Core Banks)
Month	Jan	Feb	Mar	Apr	May	Jun	Jul	Aug	Sep	Oct	Nov	Dec	Year
Daily mean °F (°C)	49 (9)	46 (8)	52 (11)	59 (15)	68 (20)	74 (23)	78 (26)	80 (27)	77 (25)	70 (21)	58 (14)	55 (13)	64 (18)
Source: NOAA

== Ecology ==
According to the A. W. Kuchler U.S. potential natural vegetation types, Core Banks, North Carolina would have a dominant vegetation type of Live oak/Sea Oats Uniola paniculata (90) with a dominant vegetation form of Coastal Prairie (20).

== Gallery ==
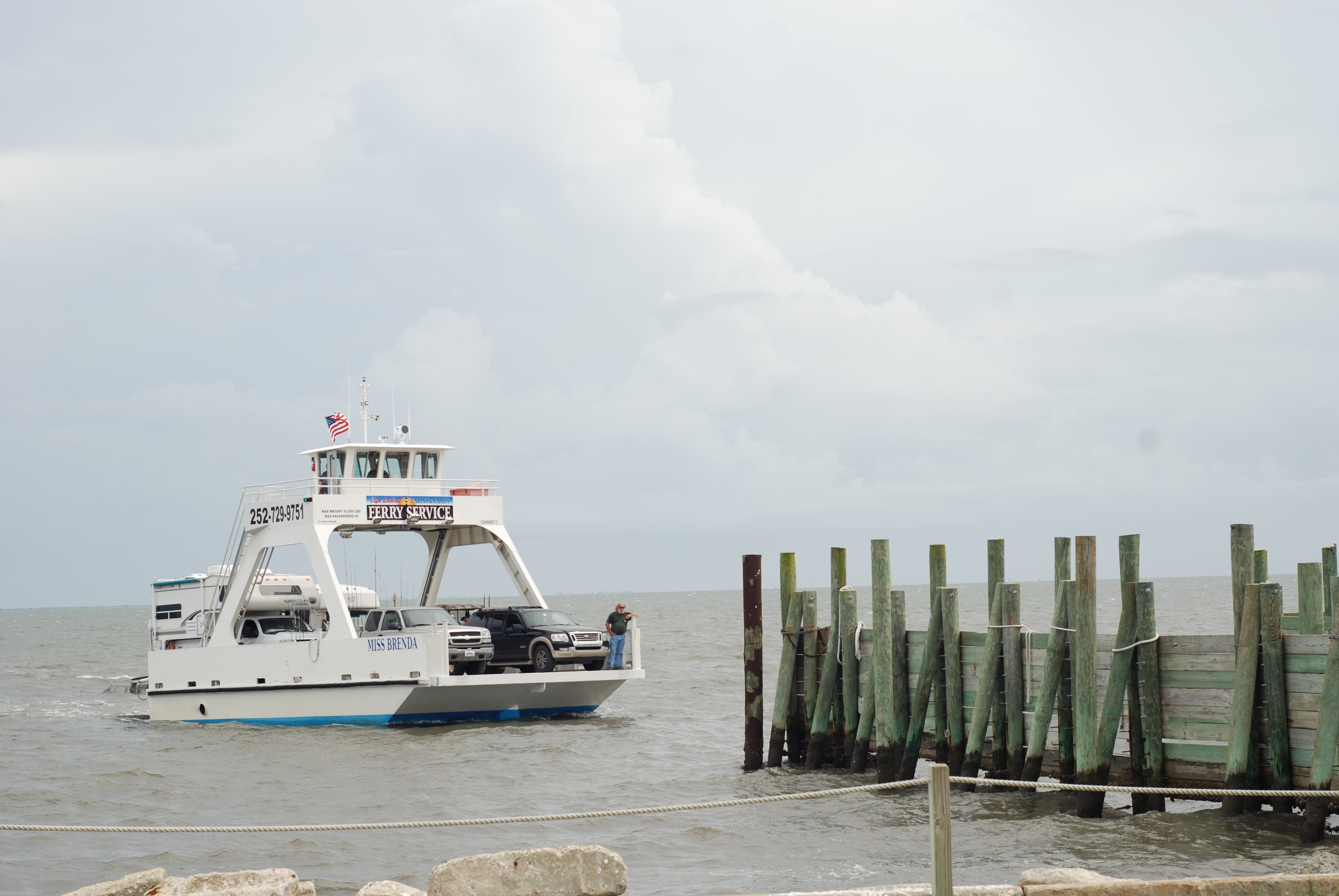
Access by ferry

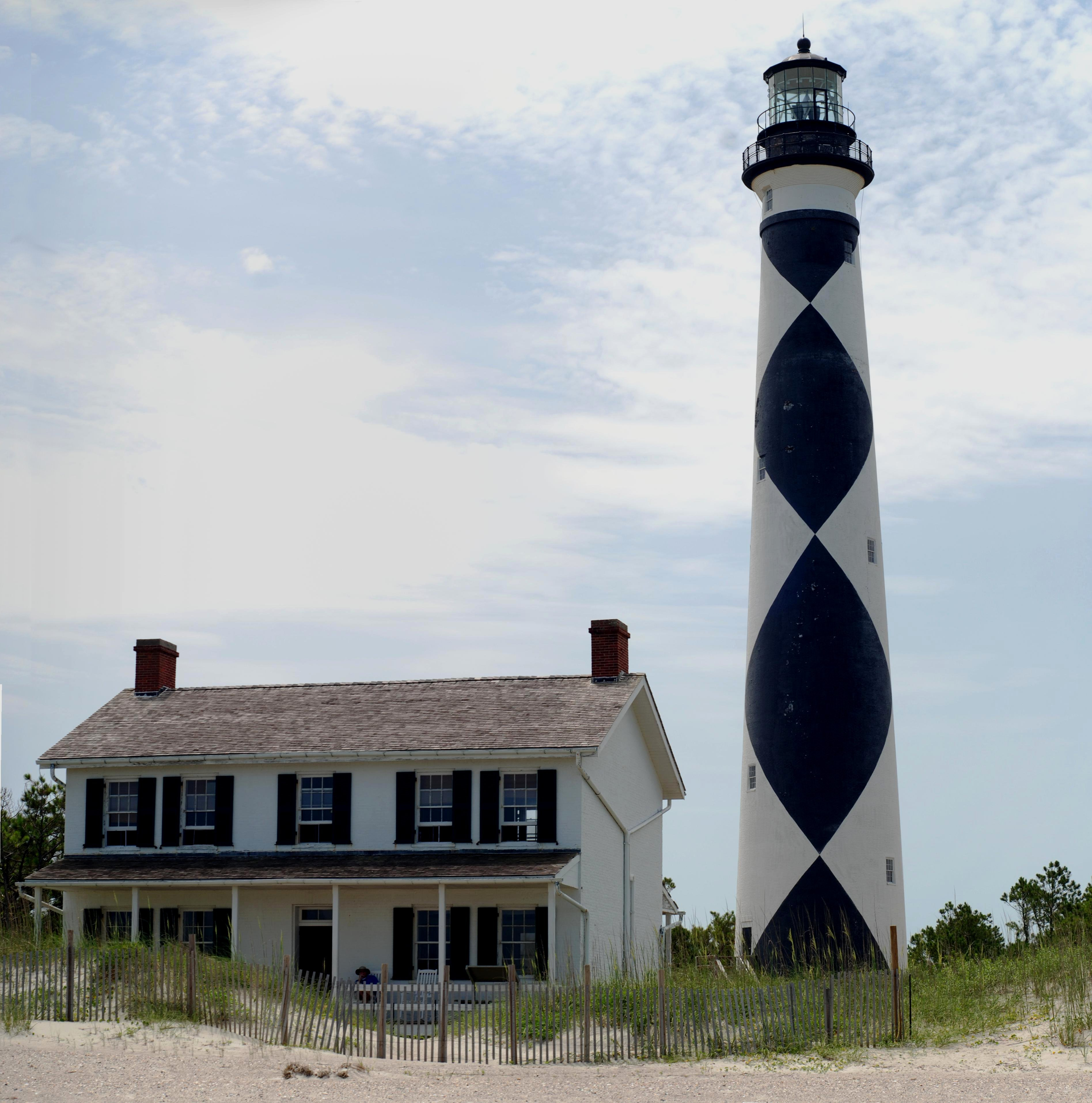
Cape Lookout Lighthouse and Keeper's Quarters.

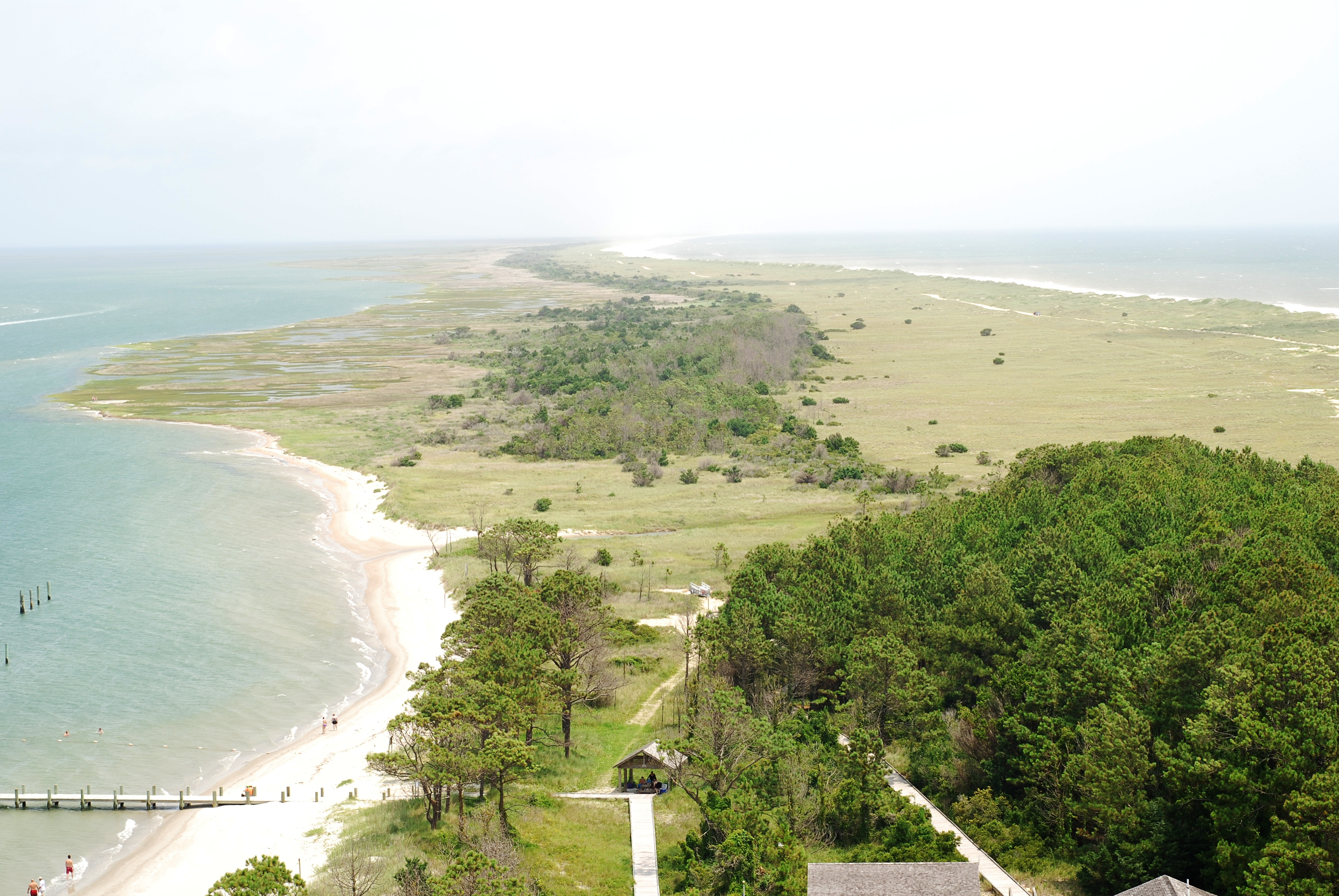
View from Cape Lookout Lighthouse looking North East

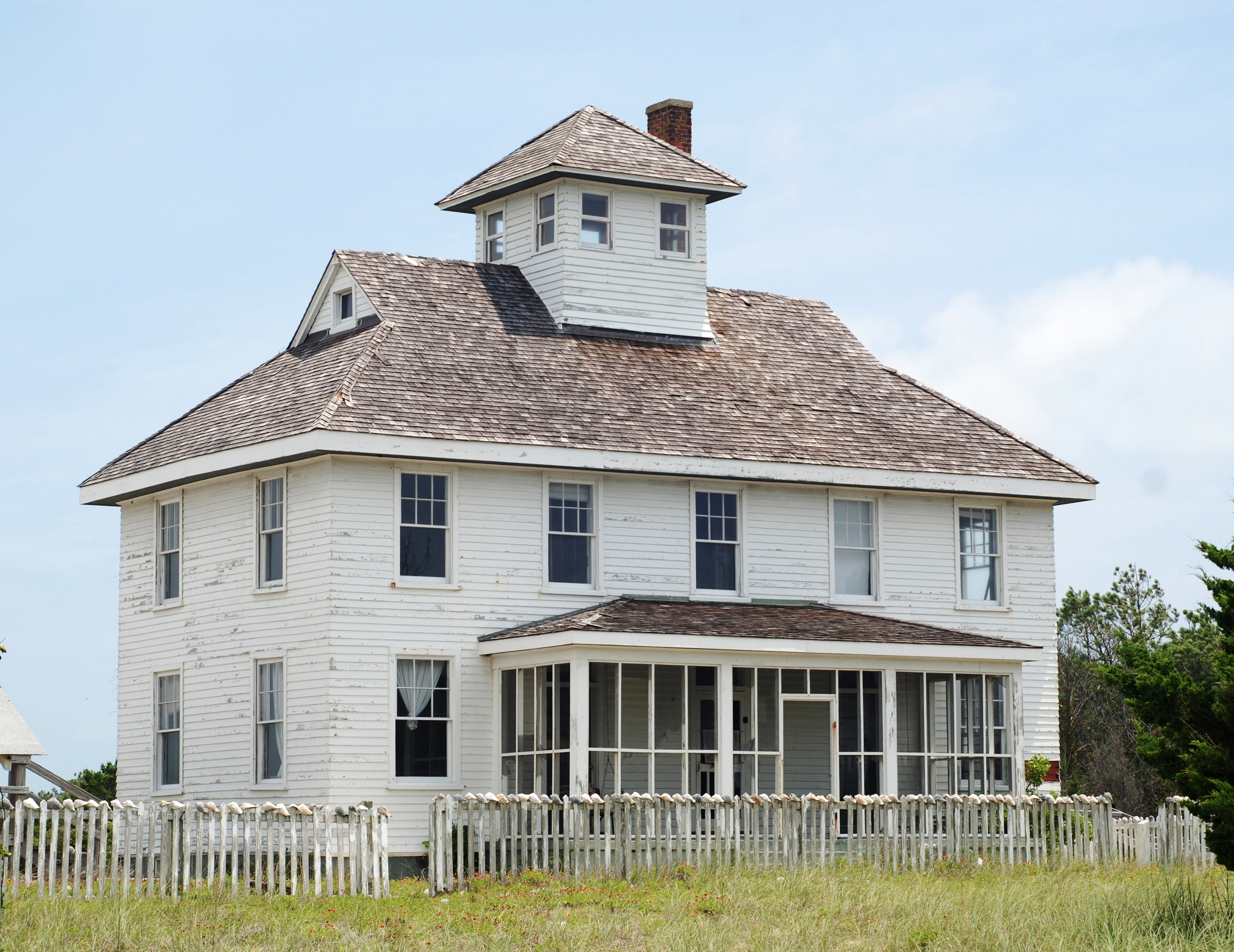
Cape Lookout Coast Guard Station

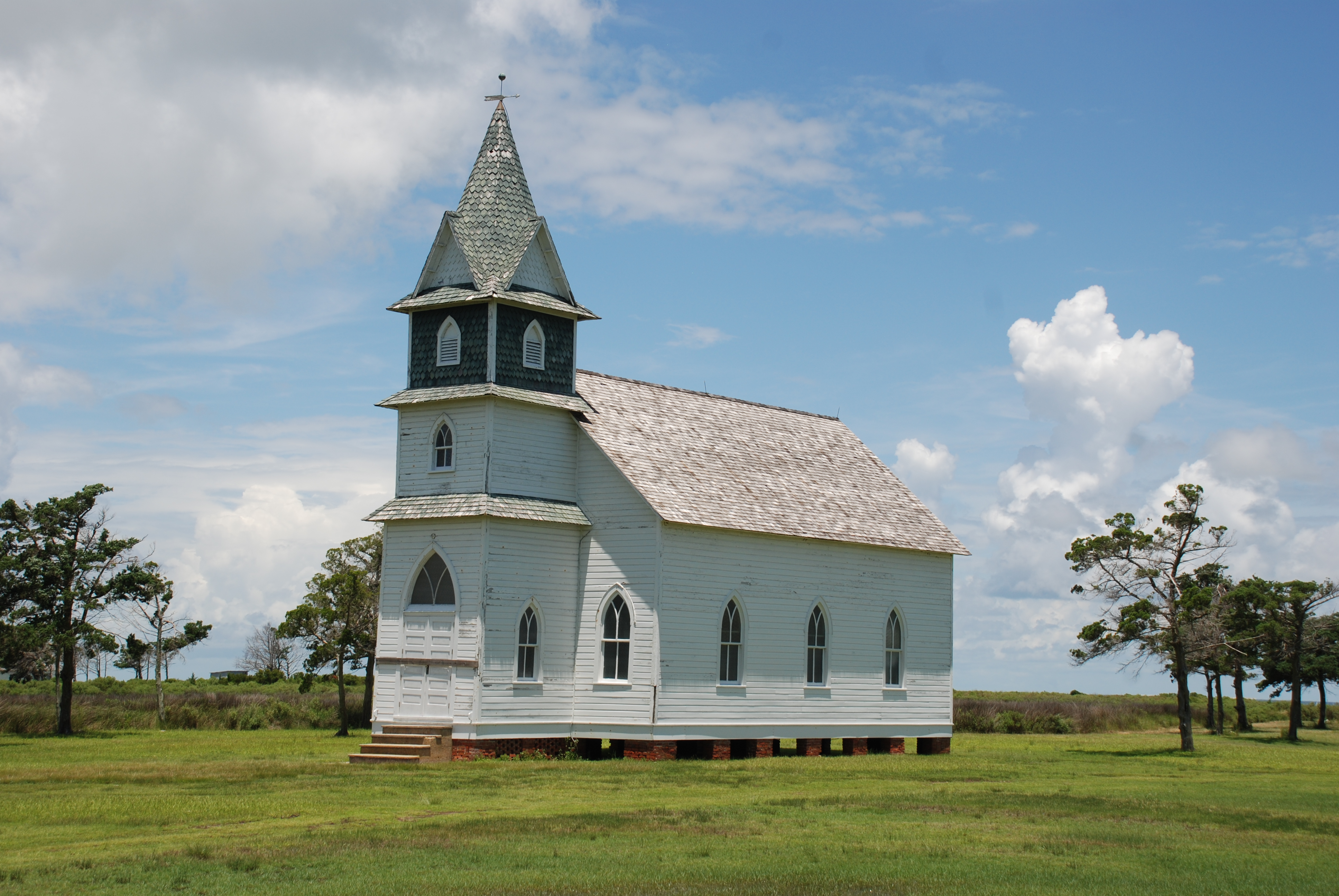
Portsmouth church

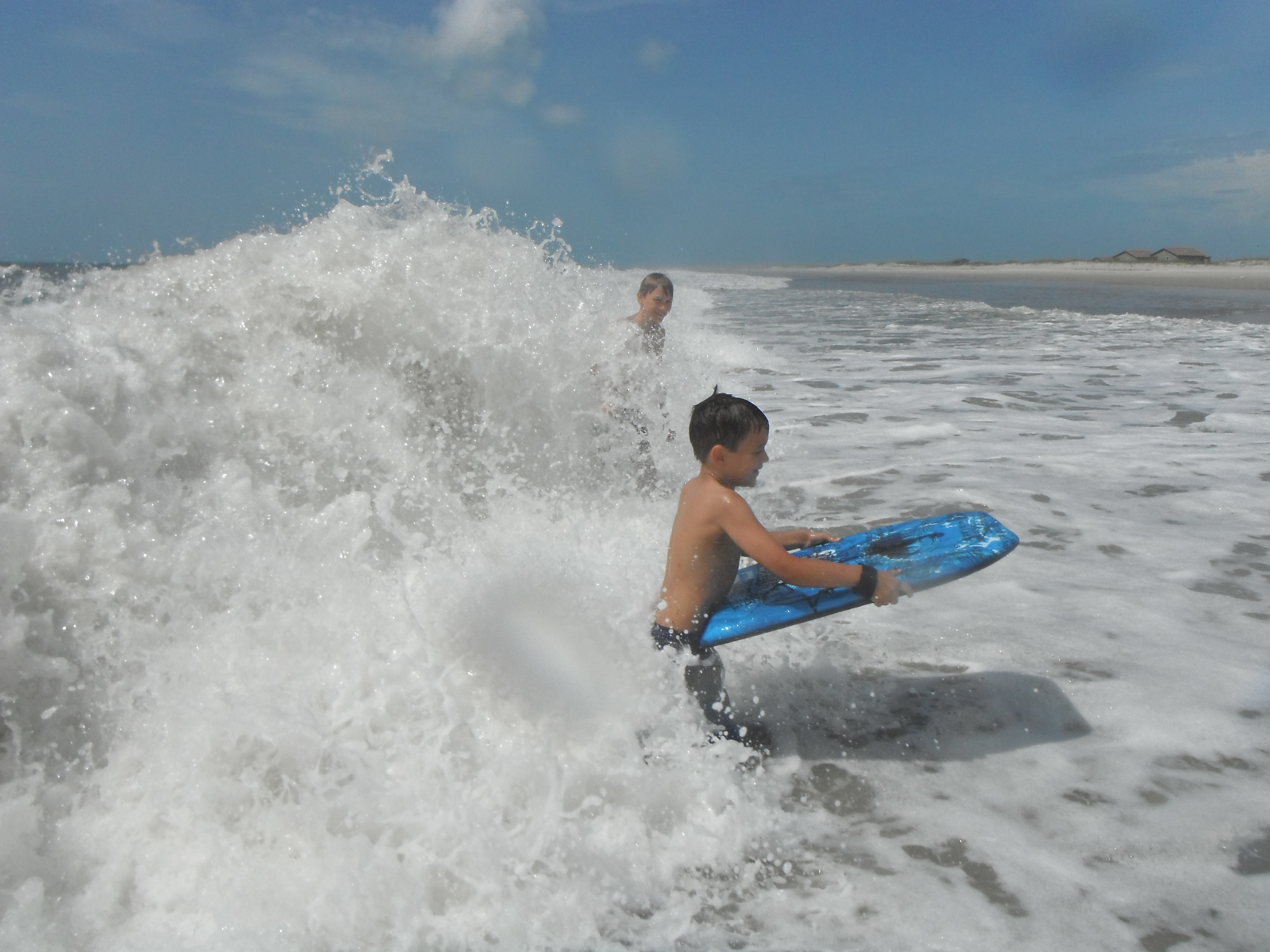
Bodyboarding near Great Island cabins

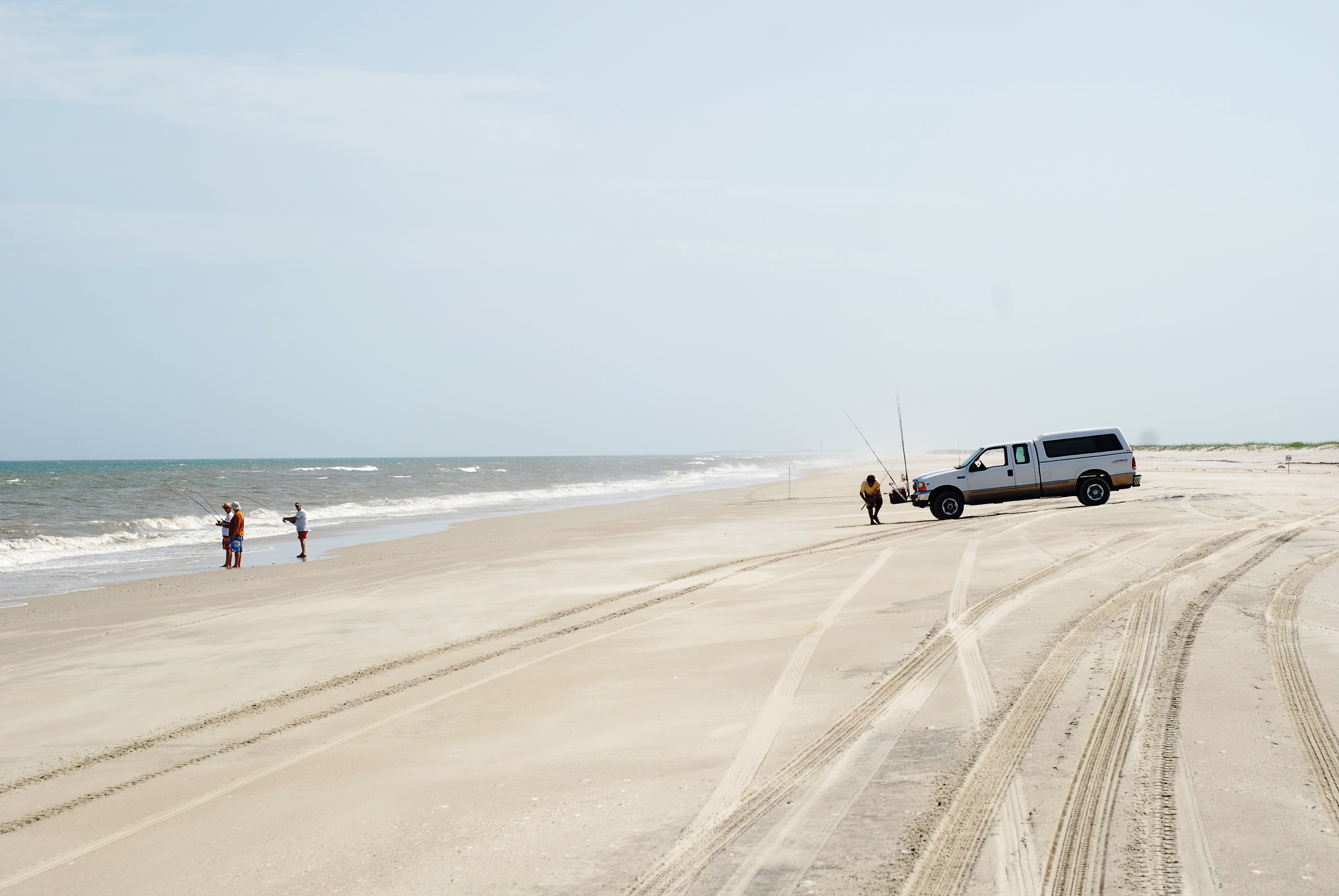
Surf fishing

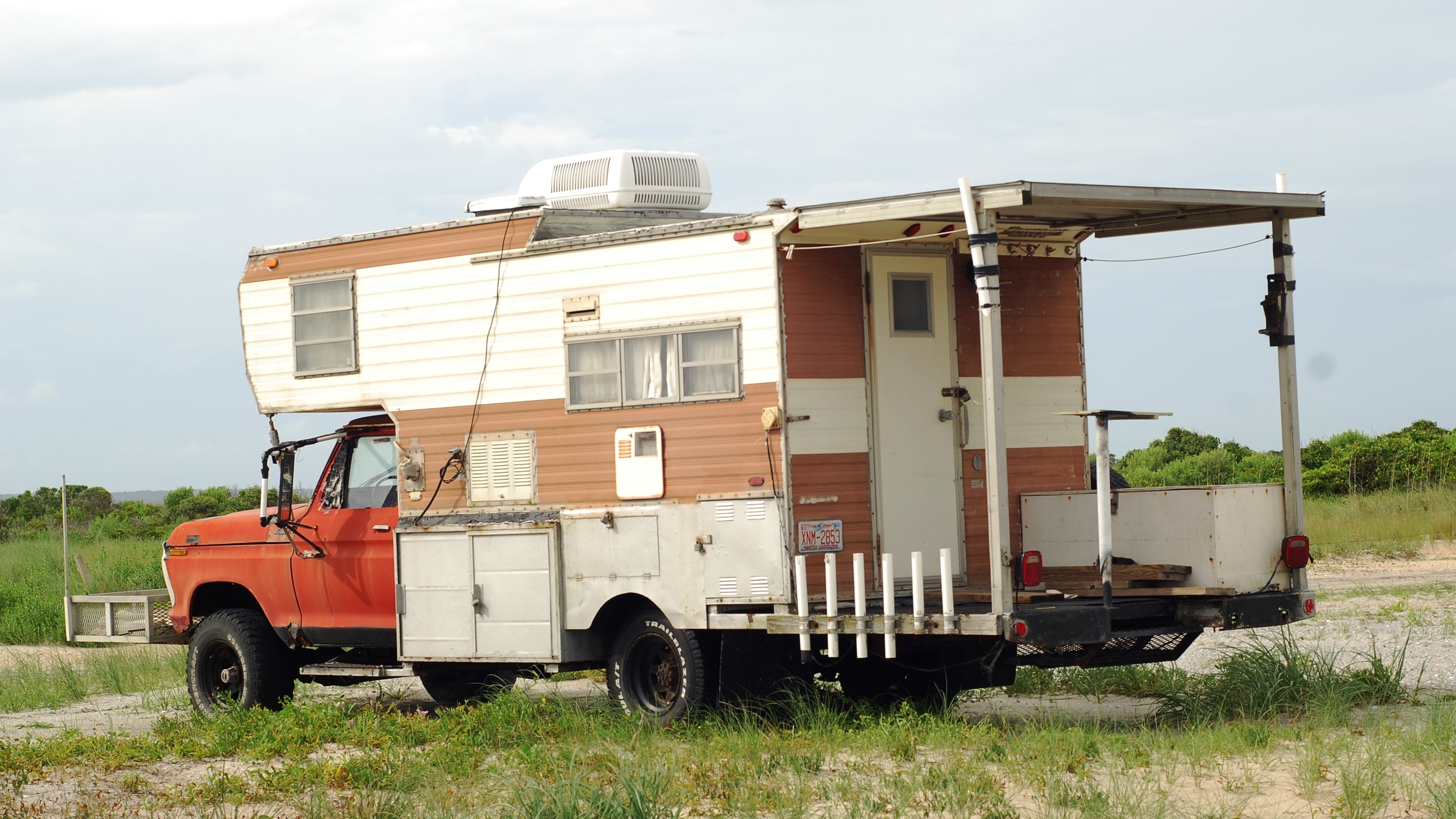
Recreational vehicle customized for beach driving and surf fishing.

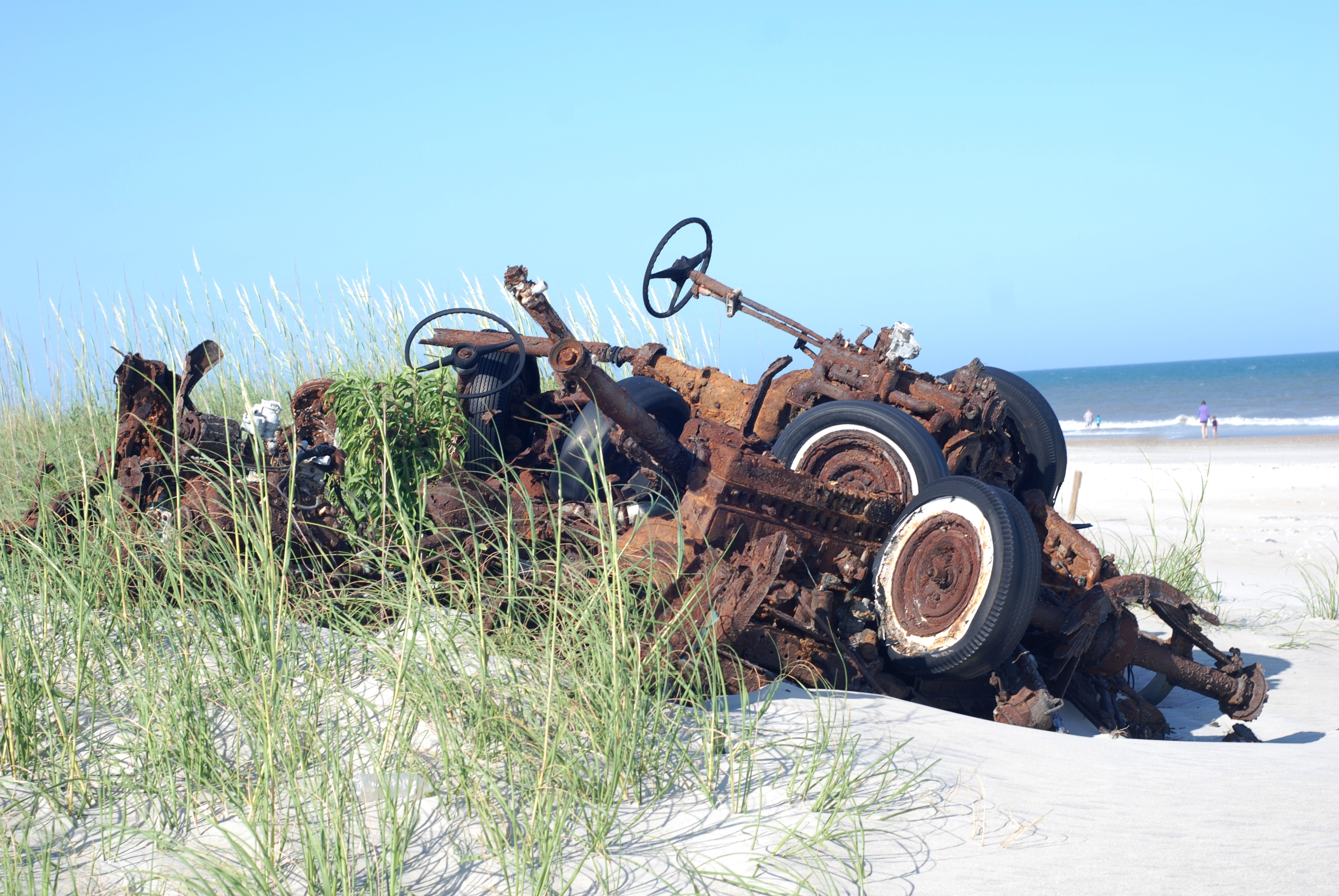
In 1976, about 1,500 vehicles were removed from the island. Few remain.

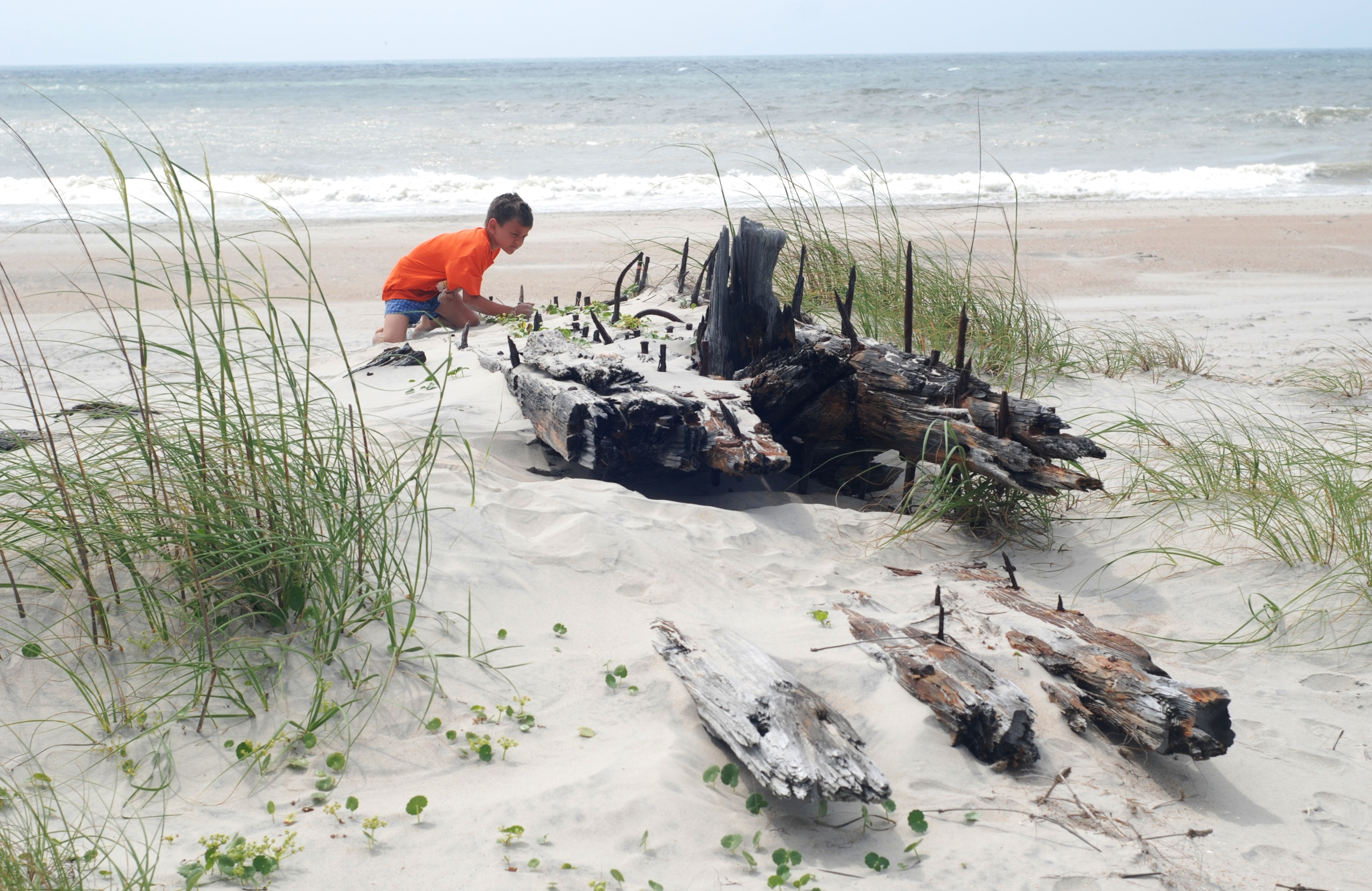
Many shipwreck remains can be found on the beaches

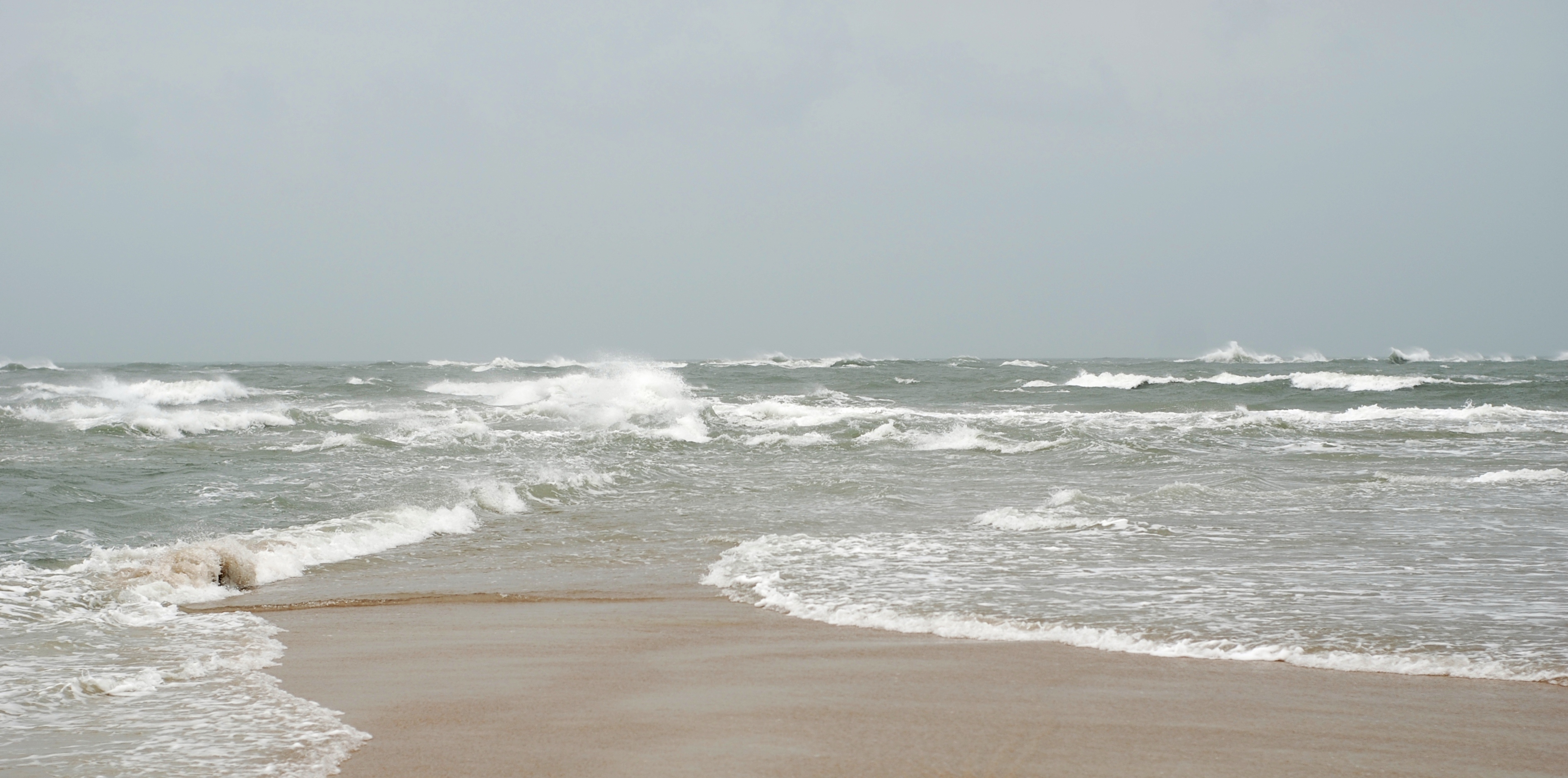
Confusing wave patterns at the beach at Cape Lookout point. Waves are coming from several directions.

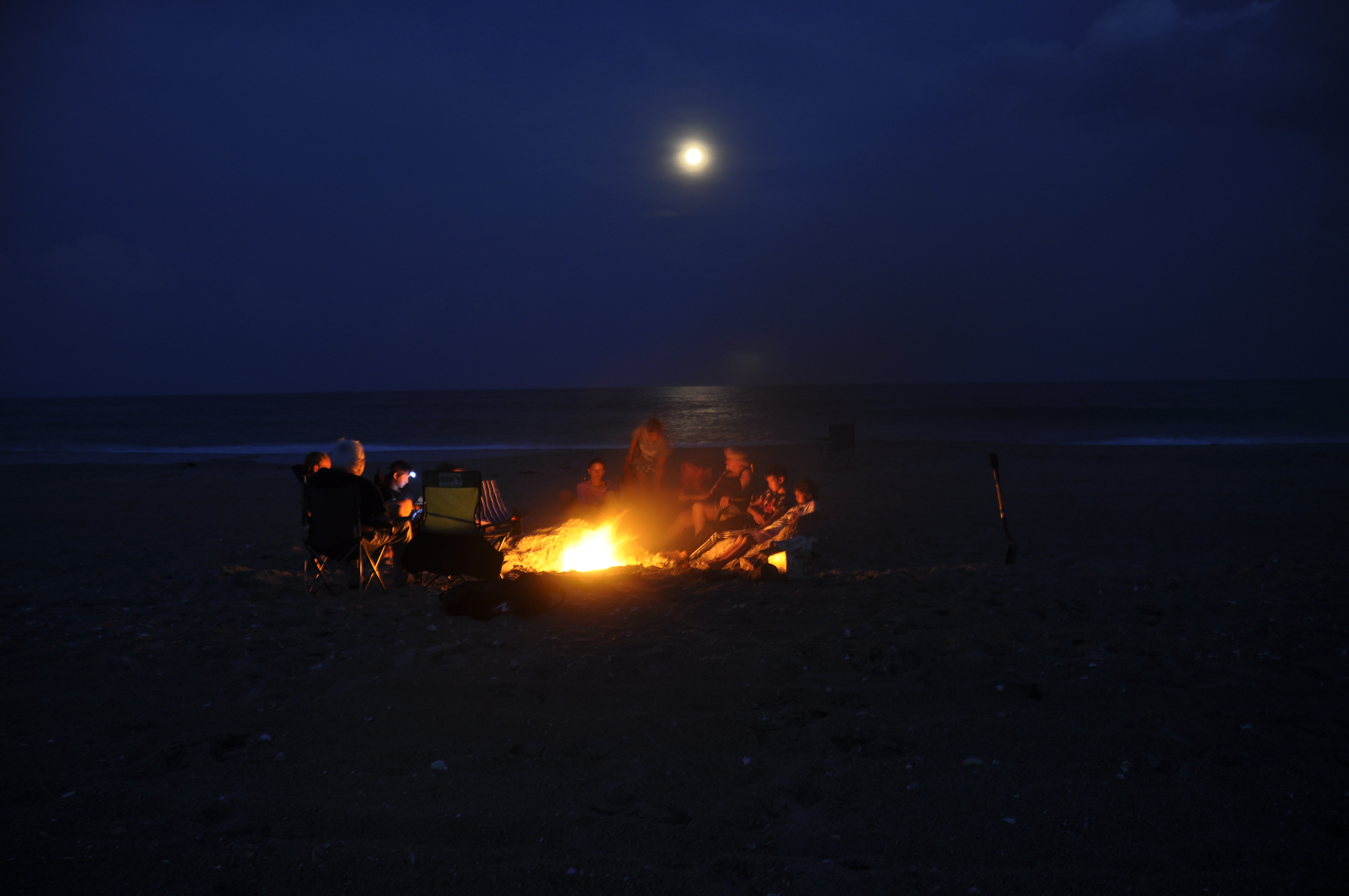
Fires are allowed on the beach

Preceded by Portsmouth Island	Beaches of The Outer Banks	Succeeded by Cape Lookout
