= Cape Lookout National Seashore =

Protected area in North Carolina, US

- IUCN category V (protected landscape/seascape)
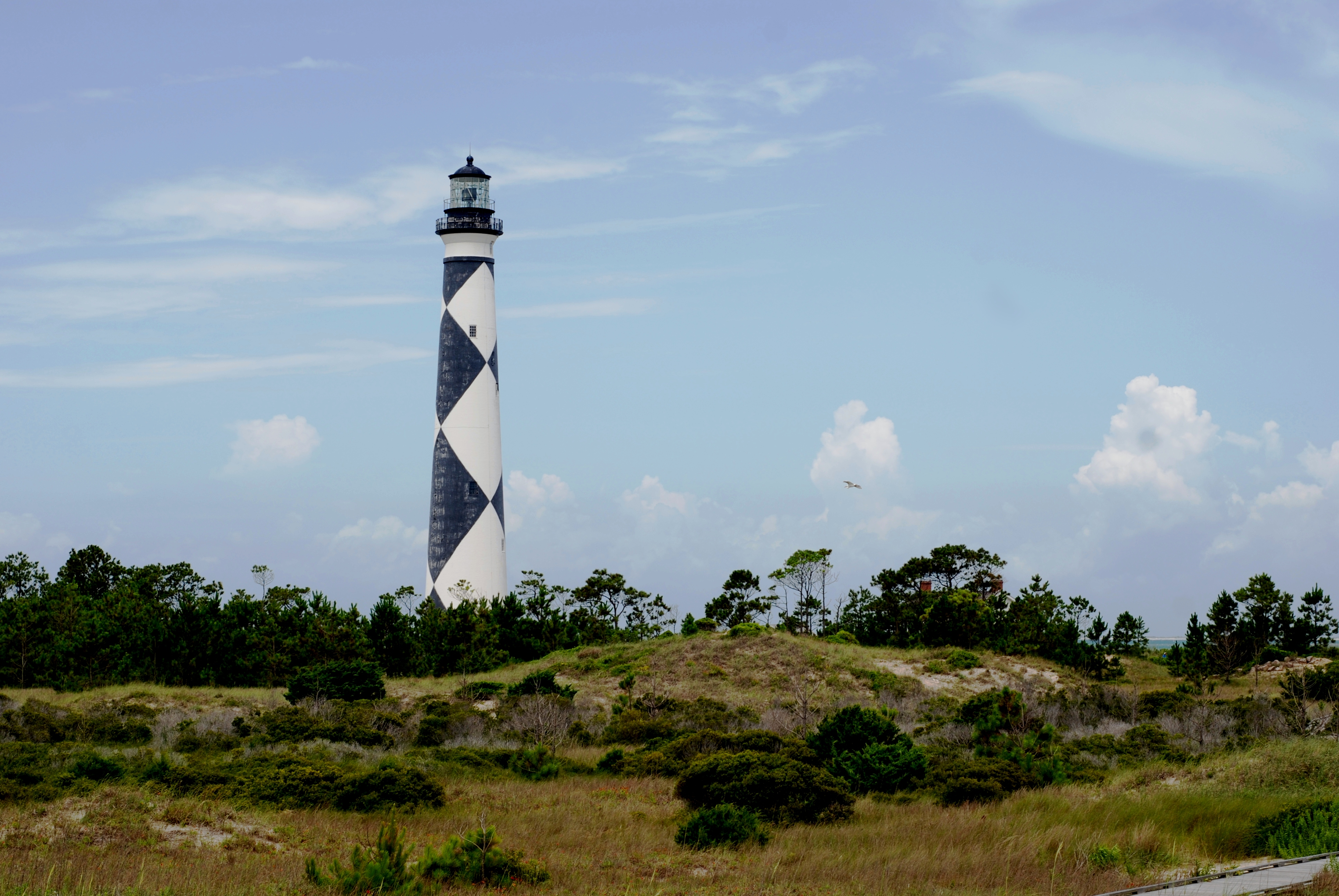
- Cape Lookout Lighthouse

- Location within North Carolina Location within the United States
- Location: Outer Banks, Carteret County, North Carolina, United States
- Nearest city: Harkers Island, North Carolina
- Coordinates: 34°36′45″N 76°31′50″W
- Area: 28,243 acres (114.30 km^{2})
- Established: March 10, 1966
- Visitors: 541,533 (in 2022)
- Governing body: National Park Service
- Website: Cape Lookout National Seashore

Cape Lookout National Seashore preserves a 56-mile (90-km) long section of the Southern Outer Banks, or Crystal Coast, of North Carolina, United States, running from Ocracoke Inlet on the northeast to Beaufort Inlet on the southwest. Three undeveloped barrier islands make up the seashore - North and South Core Banks and Shackleford Banks. The seashore includes two historic villages on Core Banks, Shackleford's wild horses, and the Cape Lookout Lighthouse, which has a black-and-white diamond pattern. A visitor center for the seashore is located on Harkers Island.

The National Park Service, as part of their Centennial Initiative celebrating its 100th anniversary in 2016, is planning to rehabilitate the Lighthouse and restore the Cape Lookout and Portsmouth Village Historic Districts.

== History ==
Official National Park Service map

The National Seashore was authorized on March 10, 1966. It was named a North Carolina Natural Heritage Area on May 23, 1986. The seashore was designated the Carolinian-South Atlantic Biosphere Reserve on June 16, 1986. Near noon on September 9, 2007, Tropical Storm Gabrielle made landfall at this exact point with winds of 60 mph (97 km/h). Damage was light but flooding and beach erosion affected this lookout. On August 27, 2011, Hurricane Irene made landfall near Cape Lookout as a Category 1 storm with 85 mph sustained winds. Hurricane Arthur also made landfall near Cape Lookout as a Category 2 storm with 100 mph sustained winds.

== Laws ==
The Corolla Wild Horses Protection Act (H.R. 126;113th Congress), if passed, would take wild horses from herds on the Cape Lookout National Seashore and introduced them to the herds in the Currituck National Wildlife Refuge in order to ensure genetic viability.

== Climate ==
According to the Trewartha climate classification system, Cape Lookout National Seashore, North Carolina has a humid subtropical climate with hot and humid summers, cool winters and year-around precipitation (Cfak). Cfak climates are characterized by all months having an average mean temperature > 32.0 °F (> 0.0 °C), at least eight months with an average mean temperature ≥ 50.0 °F (≥ 10.0 °C), at least one month with an average mean temperature ≥ 71.6 °F (≥ 22.0 °C) and no significant precipitation difference between seasons. During the summer months in Cape Lookout National Seashore, a cooling afternoon sea breeze is present on most days, but episodes of extreme heat and humidity can occur with heat index values ≥ 100 °F (≥ 38 °C). Cape Lookout National Seashore is prone to hurricane strikes, particularly during the Atlantic hurricane season which extends from June 1 through November 30, sharply peaking from late August through September. During the winter months, episodes of cold and wind can occur with wind chill values < 10 °F (< -12 °C). The plant hardiness zone at Core Sound in Cape Lookout National Seashore is 8b with an average annual extreme minimum air temperature of 16.6 °F (-8.6 °C). The average seasonal (Dec-Mar) snowfall total is < 2 inches (< 5 cm), and the average annual peak in nor'easter activity is in February.

Climate data for Core Sound, Cape Lookout National Seashore, NC (1981-2010 Averages)
Month	Jan	Feb	Mar	Apr	May	Jun	Jul	Aug	Sep	Oct	Nov	Dec	Year
Mean daily maximum °F (°C)	52.9 (11.6)	54.8 (12.7)	60.4 (15.8)	67.7 (19.8)	74.8 (23.8)	81.6 (27.6)	84.7 (29.3)	84.0 (28.9)	80.4 (26.9)	72.6 (22.6)	64.9 (18.3)	56.4 (13.6)	69.7 (20.9)
Daily mean °F (°C)	45.4 (7.4)	47.4 (8.6)	53.0 (11.7)	60.6 (15.9)	68.2 (20.1)	75.8 (24.3)	79.3 (26.3)	78.4 (25.8)	74.5 (23.6)	65.5 (18.6)	57.3 (14.1)	48.9 (9.4)	62.9 (17.2)
Mean daily minimum °F (°C)	37.9 (3.3)	39.9 (4.4)	45.5 (7.5)	53.5 (11.9)	61.6 (16.4)	70.0 (21.1)	73.8 (23.2)	72.8 (22.7)	68.5 (20.3)	58.4 (14.7)	49.7 (9.8)	41.3 (5.2)	56.1 (13.4)
Average precipitation inches (mm)	4.62 (117)	3.60 (91)	4.51 (115)	3.42 (87)	4.00 (102)	4.20 (107)	5.93 (151)	7.30 (185)	6.35 (161)	4.62 (117)	4.04 (103)	4.06 (103)	56.65 (1,439)
Average relative humidity (%)	71.7	71.6	69.5	70.9	73.2	77.1	79.2	78.6	77.0	74.0	74.6	73.2	74.2
Average dew point °F (°C)	36.8 (2.7)	38.7 (3.7)	43.3 (6.3)	51.1 (10.6)	59.3 (15.2)	68.1 (20.1)	72.3 (22.4)	71.2 (21.8)	66.8 (19.3)	57.0 (13.9)	49.3 (9.6)	40.7 (4.8)	54.6 (12.6)
Source: PRISM

Climate data for Cape Hatteras, NC Ocean Water Temperature (53 NE Core Sound)
Month	Jan	Feb	Mar	Apr	May	Jun	Jul	Aug	Sep	Oct	Nov	Dec	Year
Daily mean °F (°C)	49 (9)	46 (8)	52 (11)	59 (15)	68 (20)	74 (23)	78 (26)	80 (27)	77 (25)	70 (21)	58 (14)	55 (13)	64 (18)
Source: NOAA

== Ecology ==
According to the A. W. Kuchler U.S. potential natural vegetation types, Cape Lookout National Seashore, North Carolina would have a dominant vegetation type of Live oak/Sea Oats Uniola paniculata (90) with a dominant vegetation form of Coastal Prairie (20).

== Wildlife ==
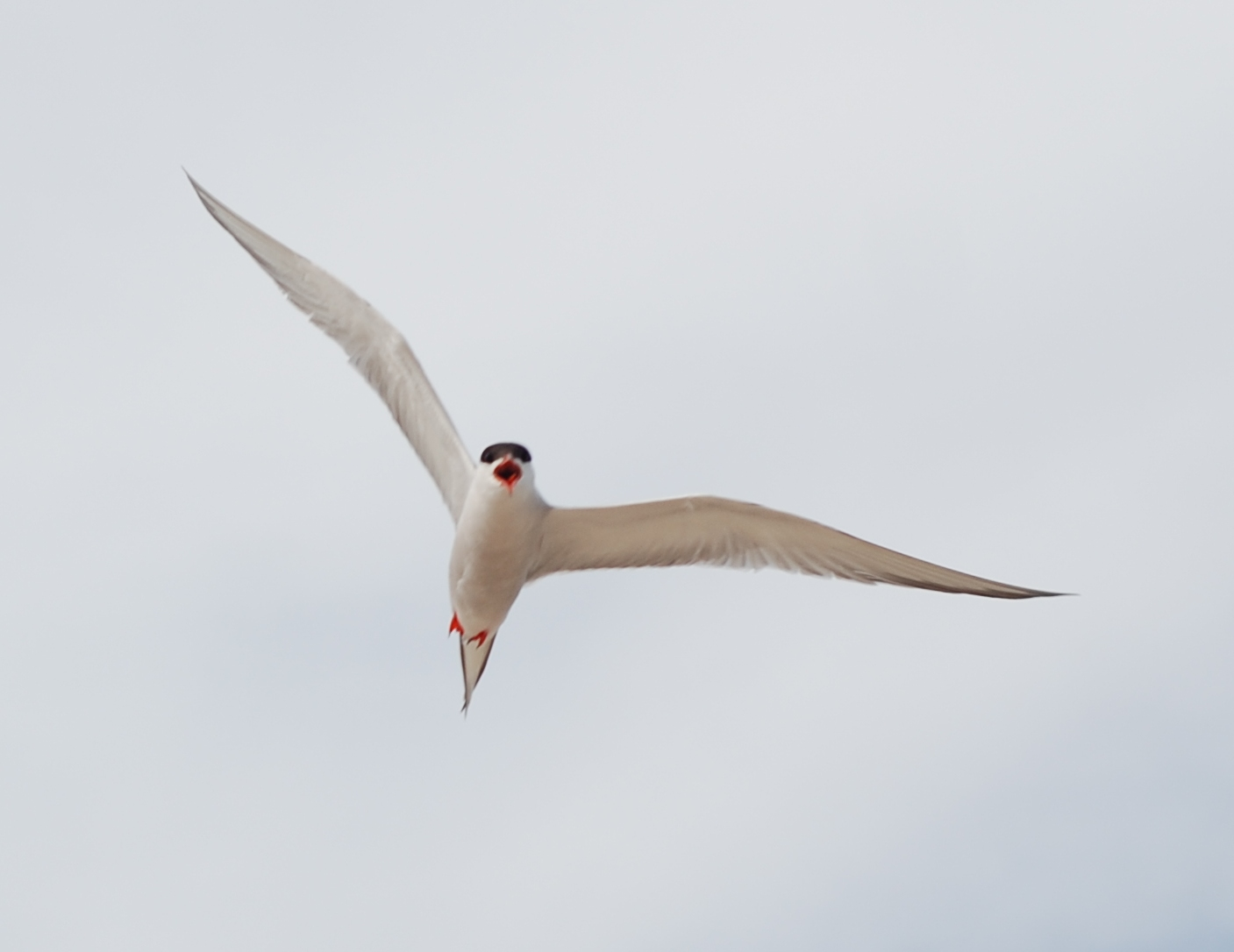
Common tern Sterna hirundo driving intruders away from the nest site

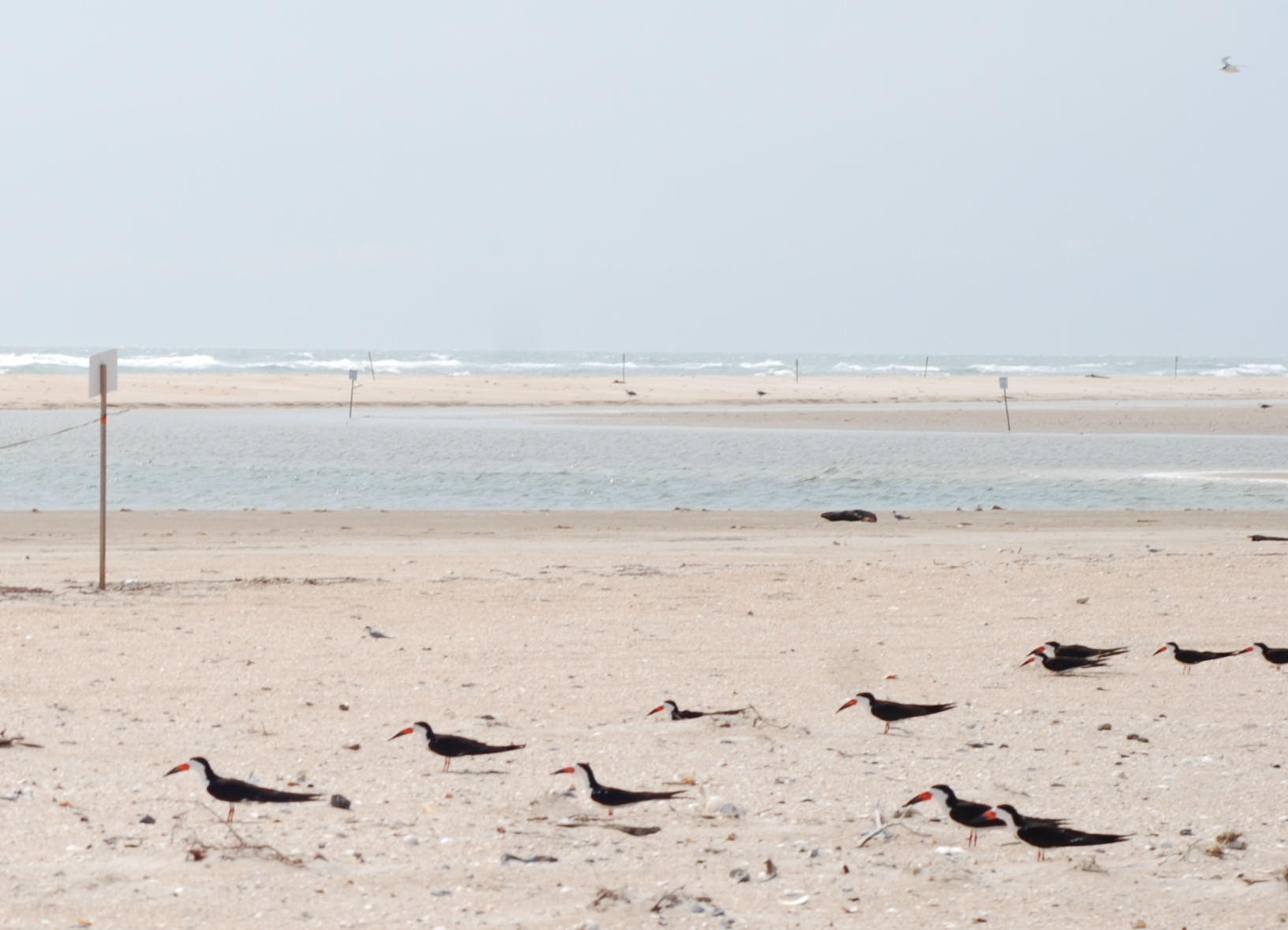
Black skimmer Rynchops niger nesting site near Cape Lookout Point at southern tip of Core Banks

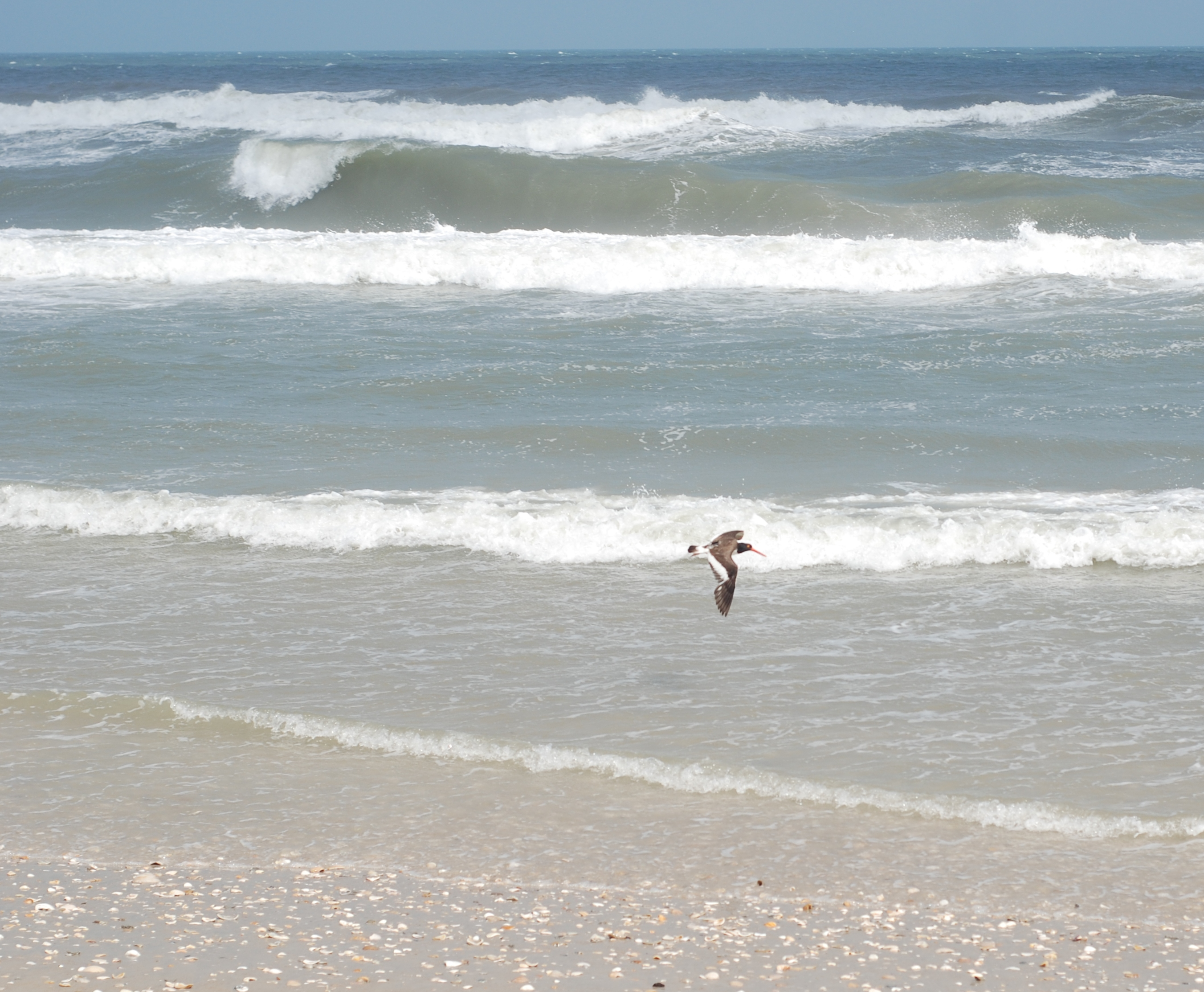
American oystercatcher Haematopus palliatus

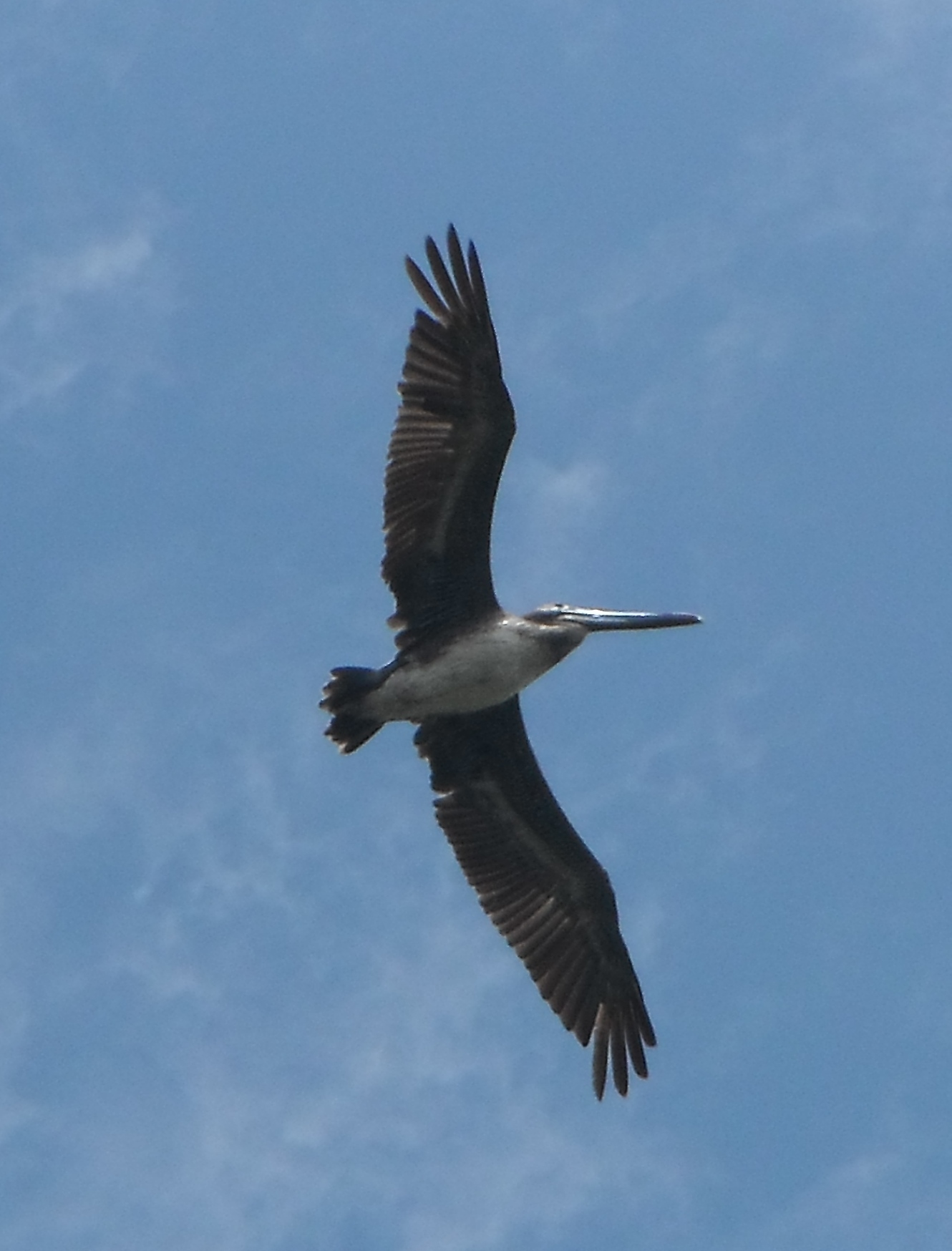
Brown pelican Pelecanus occidentalis

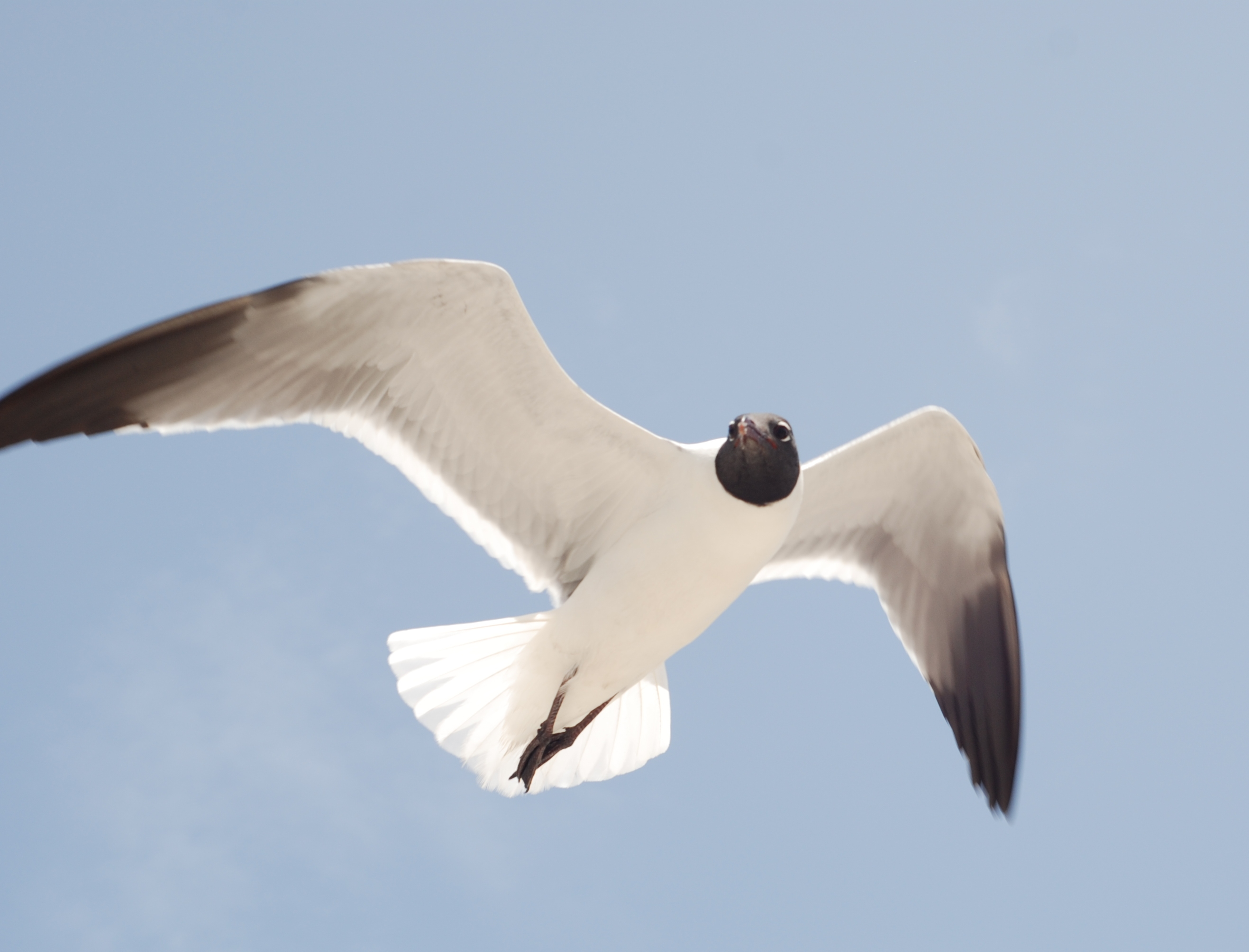
Laughing gull Leucophaeus atricilla

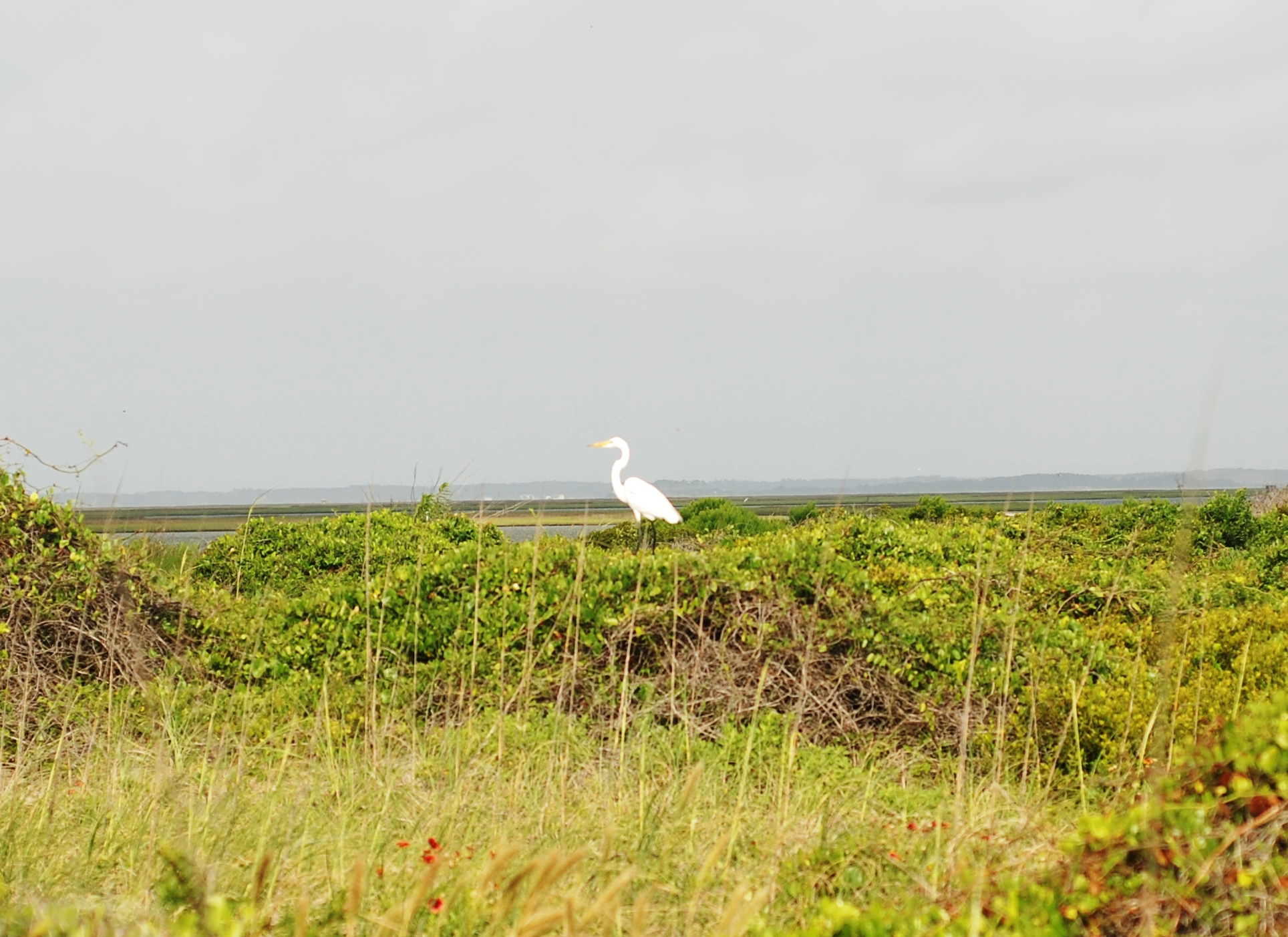
Great egret Ardea alba

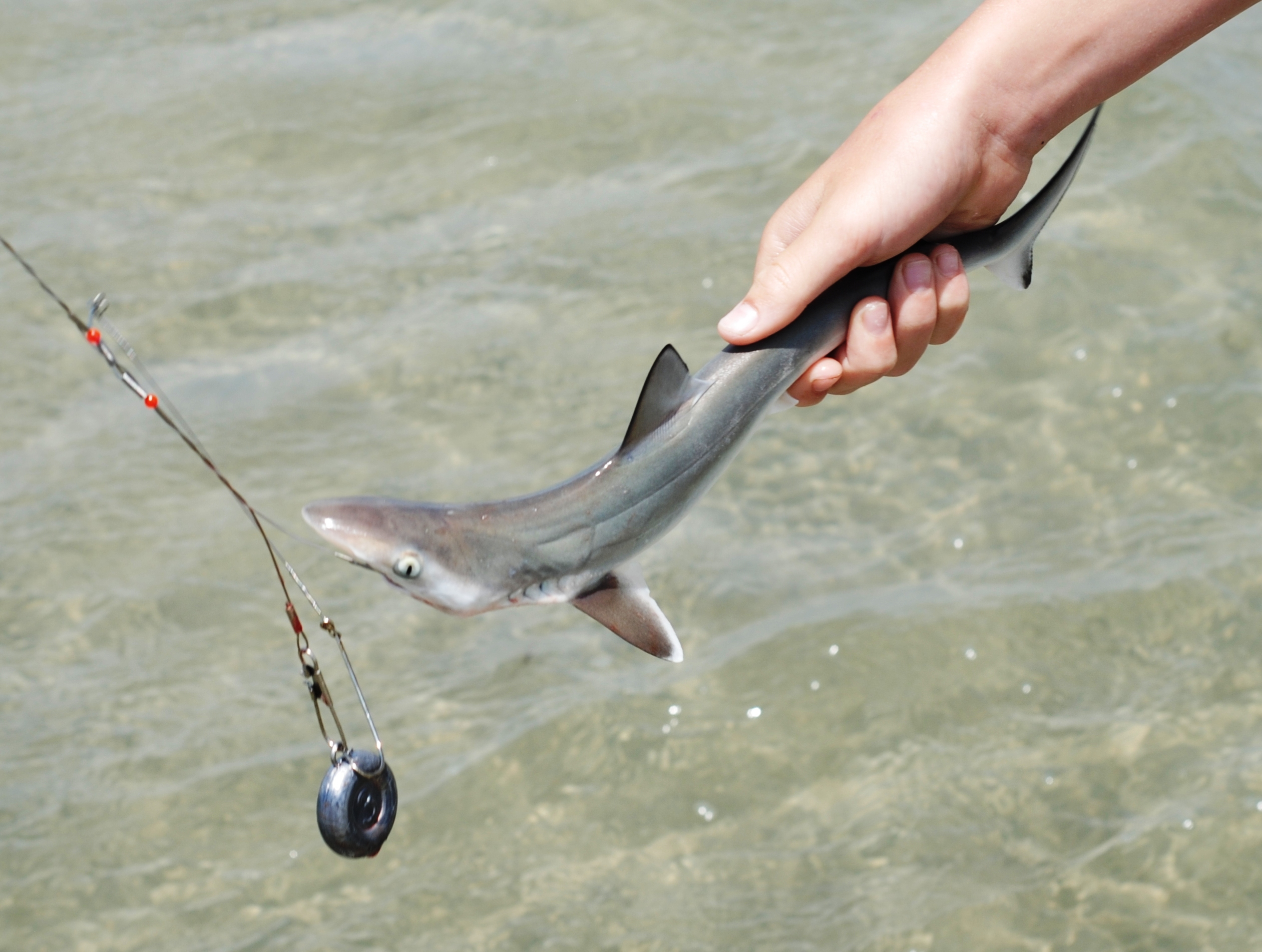
Small shark

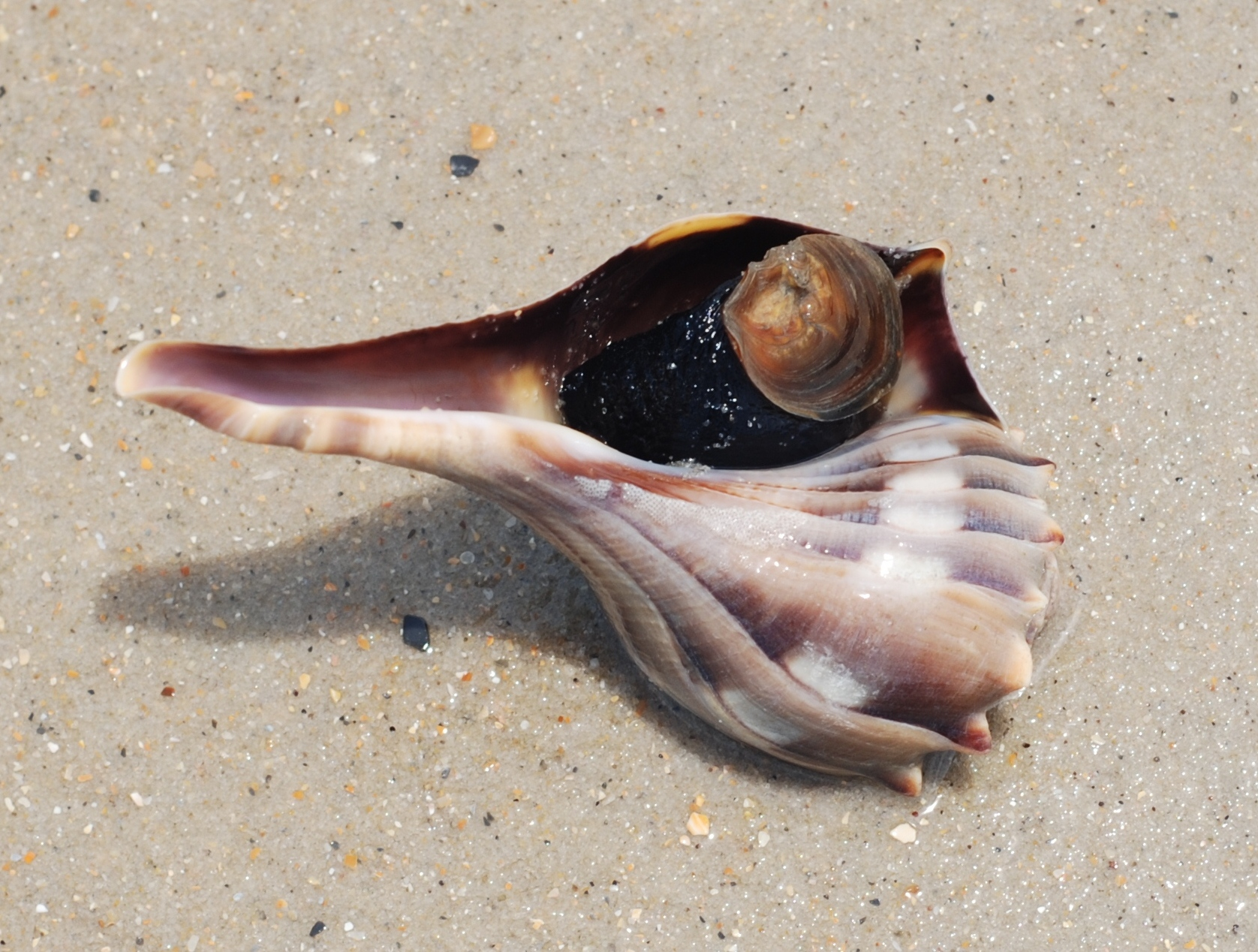
Live lightning whelk Sinistrofulgur perversum

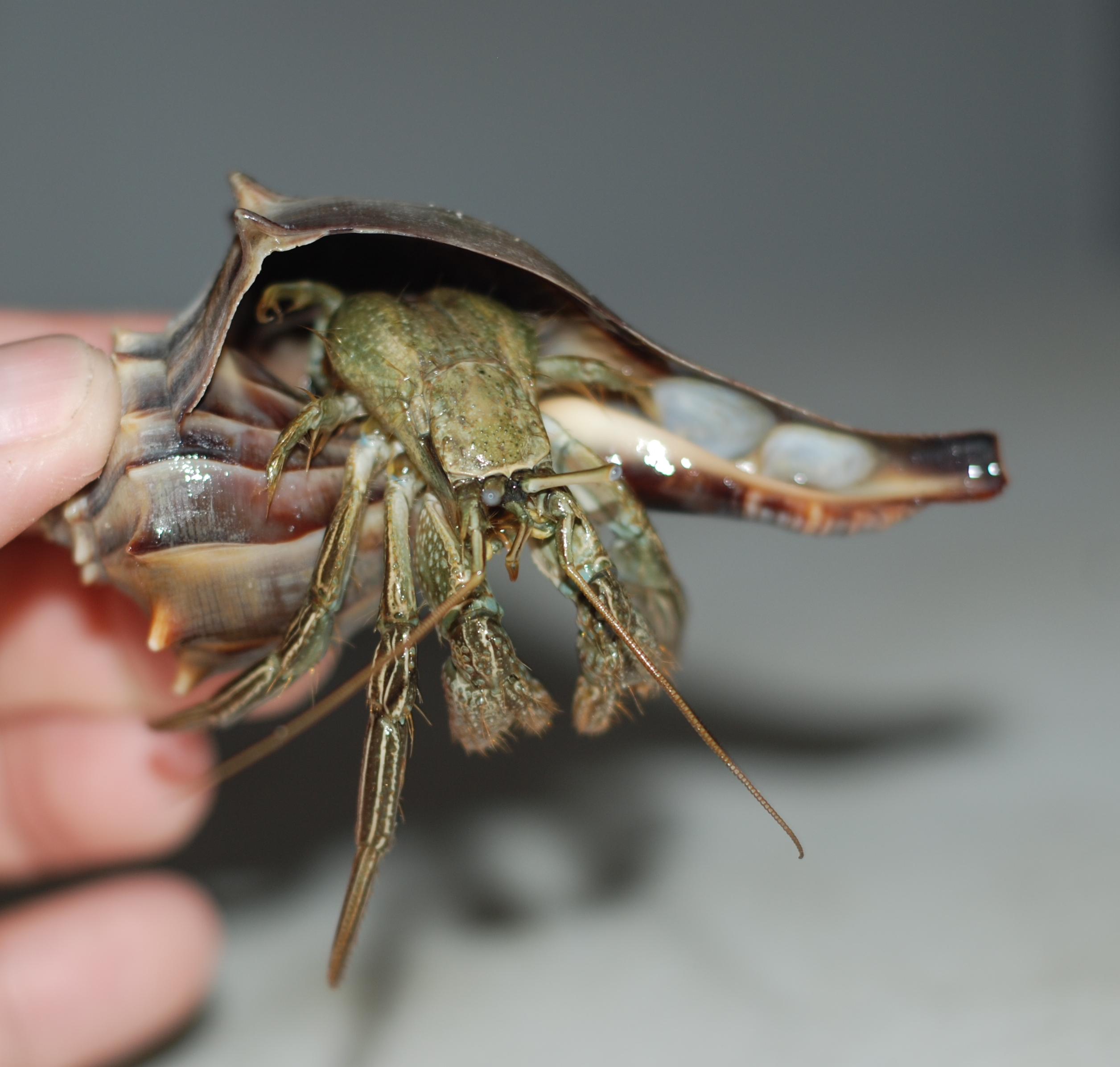
Hermit crab, possibly flat-clawed hermit crab Pagurus pollicaris, in a shell of knobbed whelk Busycon carica

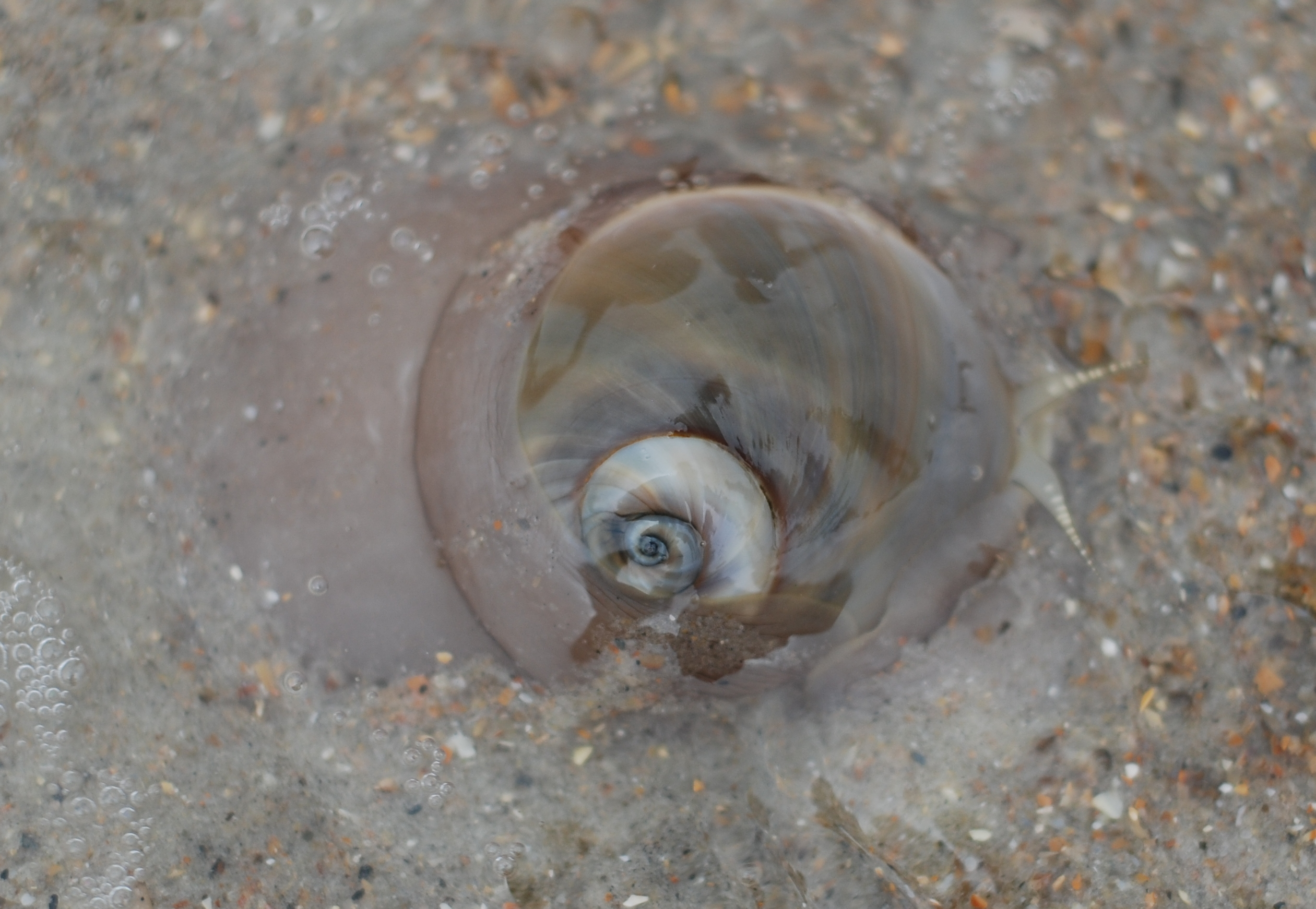
Shark eye moon snail Neverita duplicata in a shallow water on a sand bar

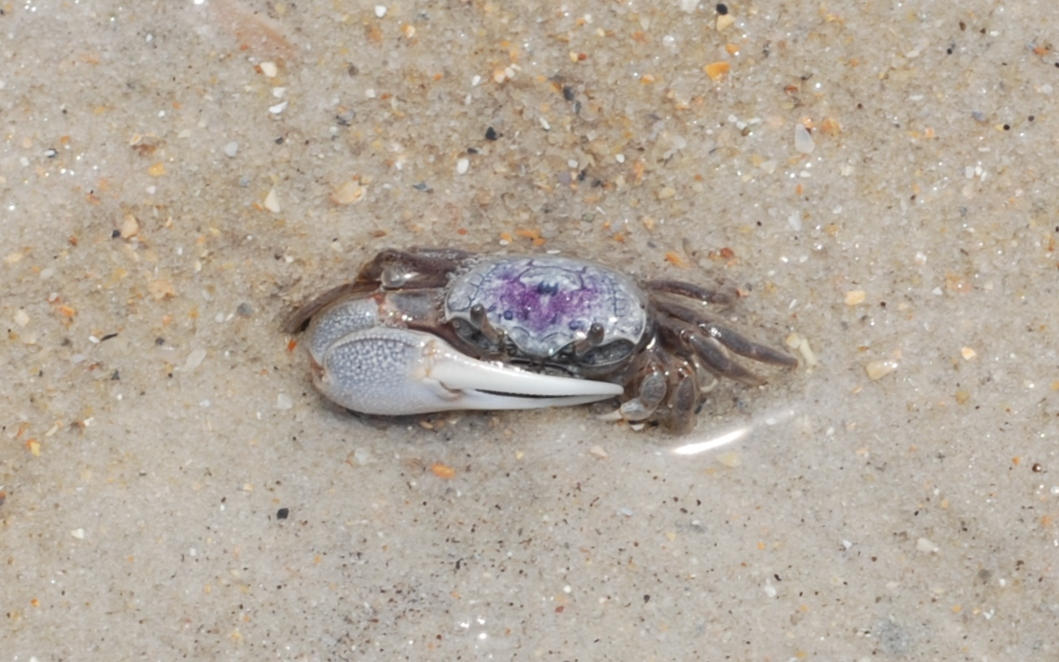
Fiddler crab

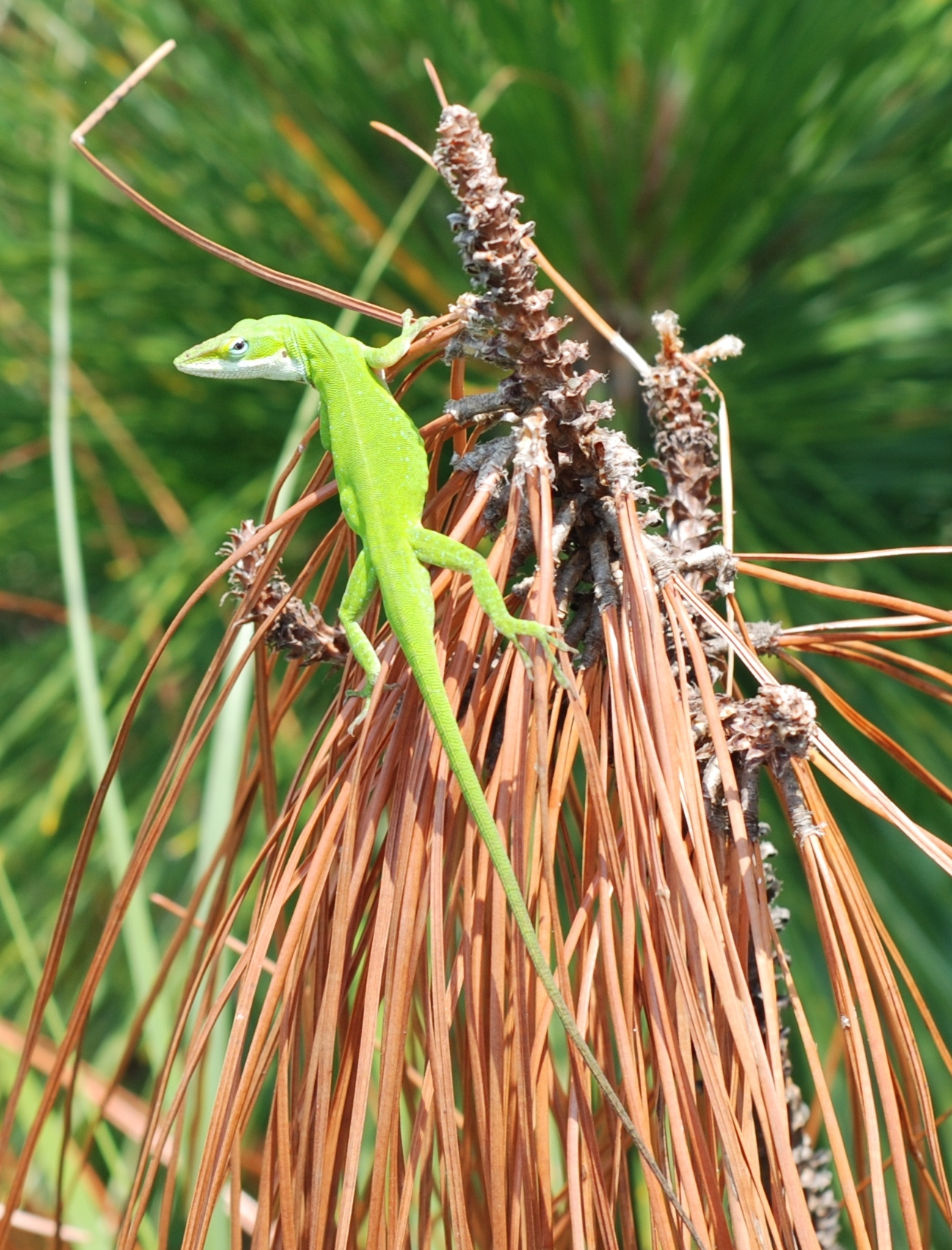
Carolina anole Anolis carolinensis

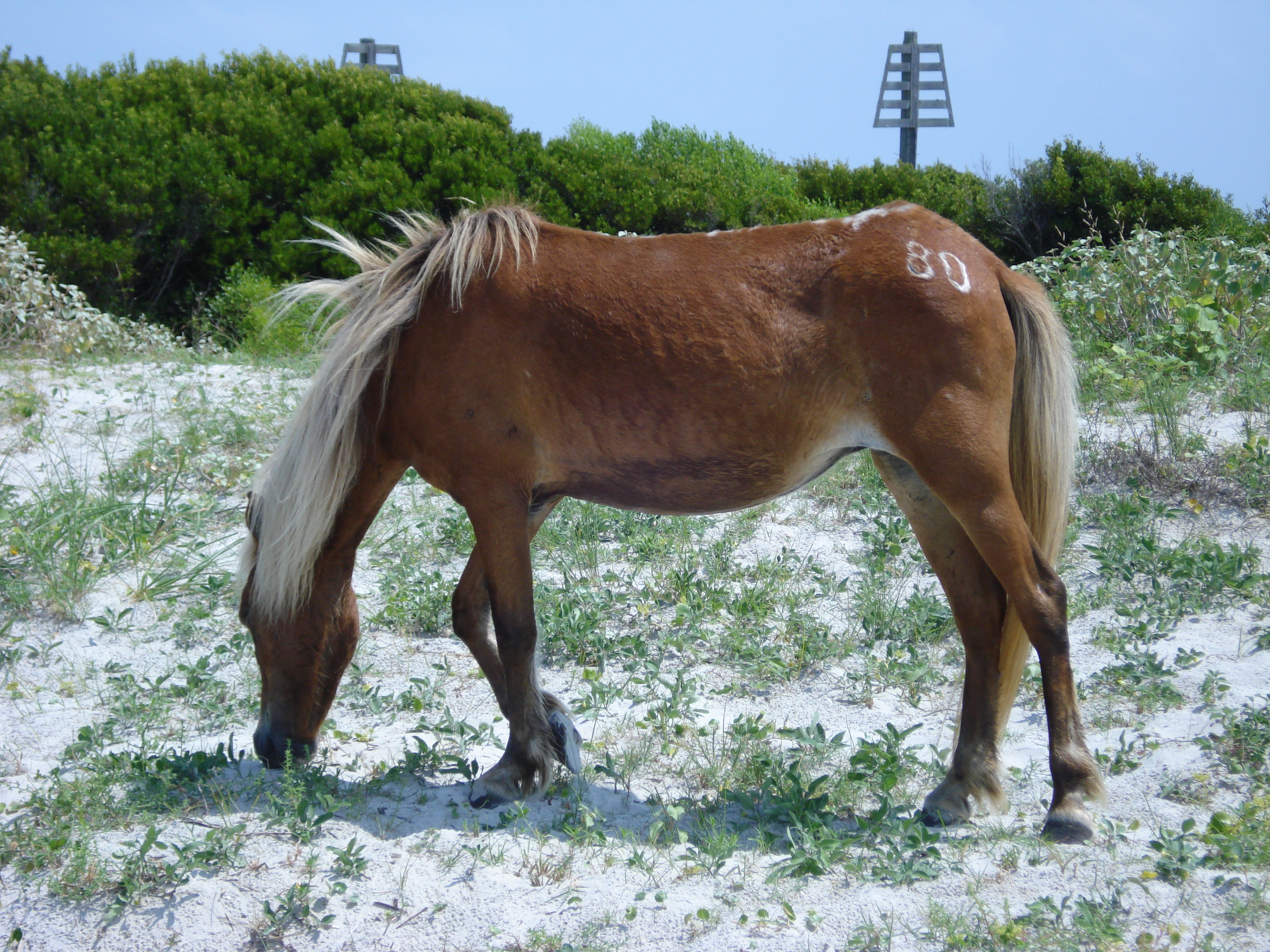
Banker horse on Shackleford Banks

== Bibliography ==
- The National Parks: Index 2001–2003. Washington: U.S. Department of the Interior.
- Timblin, Carol (September–October 2008). "A World Away: Getting to North Carolina's Cape Lookout National Seashore is getting away from it all". AAA World. side trips. Vol. 10, no. 5. AAA Midatlantic. p. 26. Archived from the original on October 7, 2008.
