= Cape Lookout Lighthouse =

Lighthouse in North Carolina, US

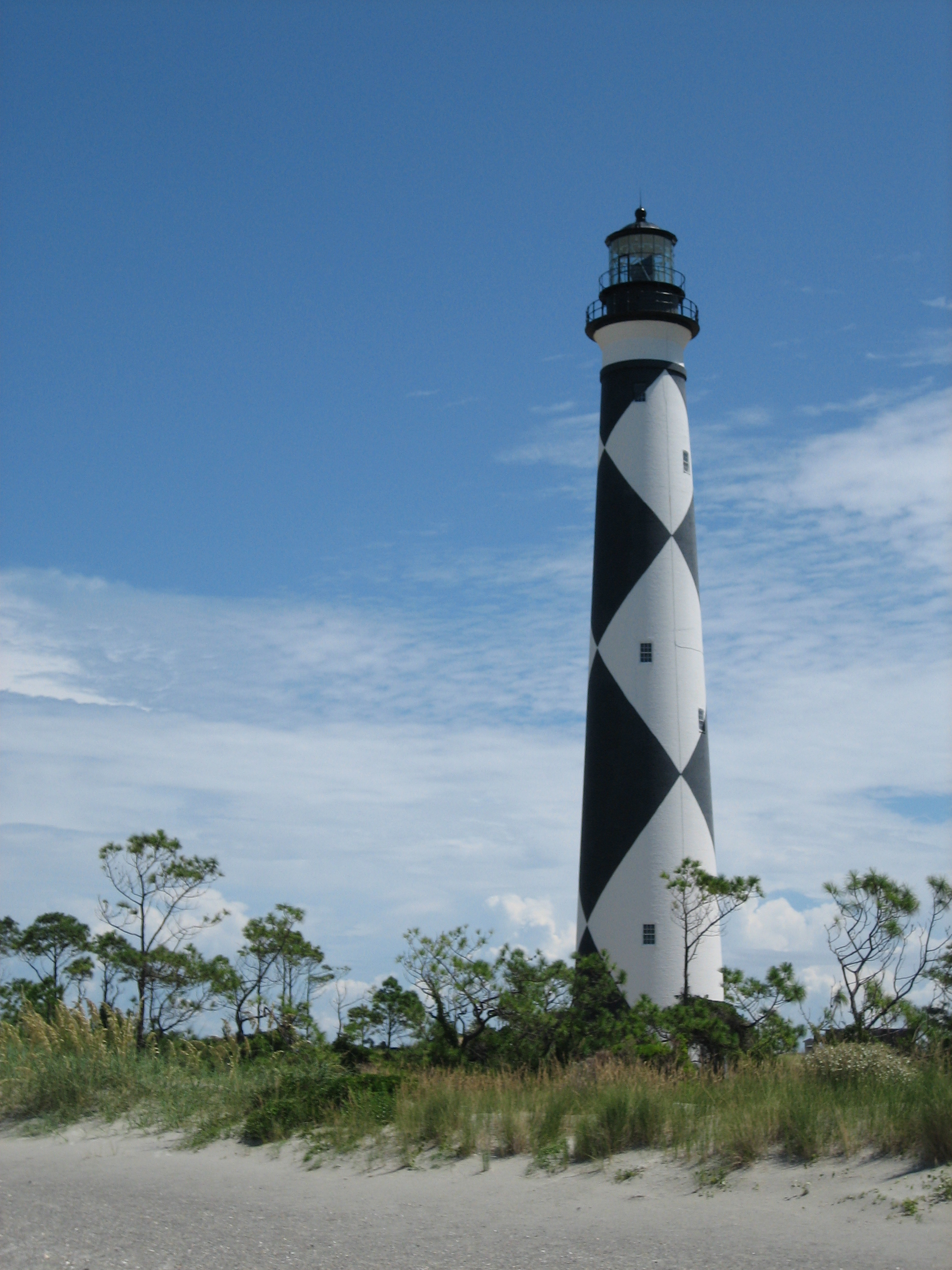
- Location: Cape Lookout (North Carolina), Carteret County, North Carolina
- Coordinates: 34°36′19″N 76°32′10″W

Tower
- Constructed: 1859
- Construction: brick
- Automated: 1950
- Height: 163 ft (50 m)
- Shape: Conical tower
- Markings: Black, white
- Heritage: National Register of Historic Places listed place, National Register of Historic Places contributing property

Light
- First lit: 1859
- Focal height: 52 m (171 ft)
- Lens: third order Fresnel lens
- Range: 12-19 miles
- Characteristic: 15-second flash cycle
- Cape Lookout Light Station
- U.S. National Register of Historic Places
- Location: On Core Banks, Core Banks, North Carolina
- Area: 25 acres (10 ha)
- Built: 1857
- NRHP reference No.: 72000097
- Added to NRHP: October 18, 1972

The Cape Lookout Lighthouse is a 163-foot-high lighthouse located on the southern Outer Banks of North Carolina. It flashes every 15 seconds and is visible at least 12 miles out to sea and up to 19 miles. It is one of the very few lighthouses that operate during the day. It became fully automated in 1950. The Cape Lookout Lighthouse is the only such structure in the United States to bear the checkered daymark, intended not only for differentiation between similar light towers, but also to show direction. The center of the black diamonds points in a north-south direction, while the center of the white diamonds points east-west.

== History ==
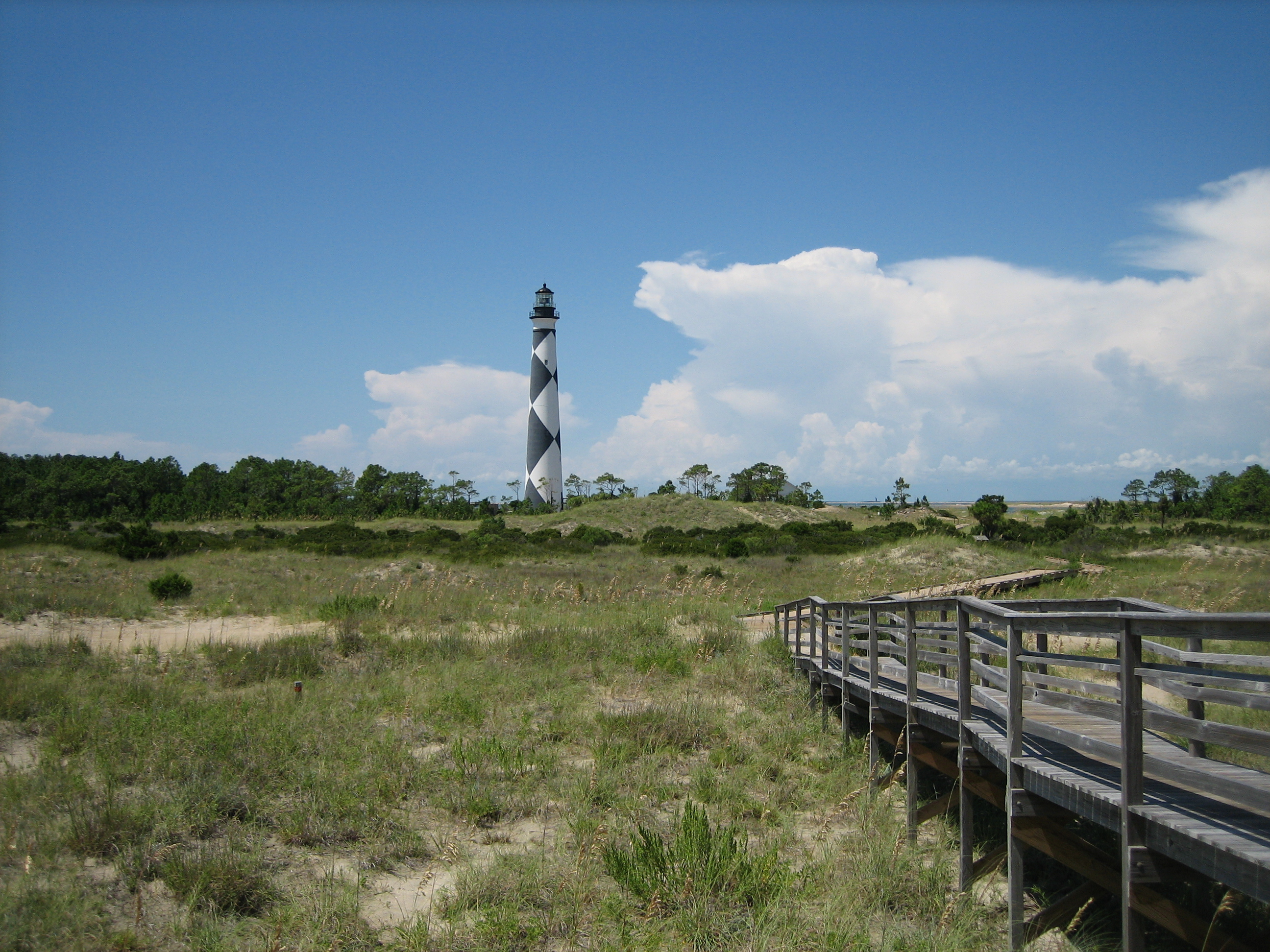
View of Cape Lookout Lighthouse from a public beach access on South Core Banks, 2007

It is the second lighthouse that has stood at this location, and is nearly identical to the Bodie Island Lighthouse, which has horizontal stripes, and the Currituck Beach Lighthouse, which is unpainted red brick. The more famous Cape Hatteras Lighthouse bears spiral stripes. The first lighthouse at Cape Lookout was completed and lit in 1812 at a cost of more than $20,000, which Congress authorized in 1804. It took eight years to build. It was the fourth lighthouse to be built in North Carolina and was a 96-foot-high brick tower with wooden shingles painted with red and white horizontal stripes. However, it proved to be too short to light the treacherous Lookout Shoals, which were nicknamed the "Horrible Headland."

The present lighthouse was completed and lit on November 1, 1859, at a cost of $45,000, which Congress approved in 1857. This lighthouse used a first-order Fresnel lens which allowed the light to shine brighter. On May 20, 1861, North Carolina joined the Confederacy and all of the lenses were removed from the coastal lighthouses and navigational beacons to prevent Union forces from using the lights to navigate the coast. Union troops captured the nearby Beaufort and Morehead City in 1862 and, by the end of the next year, a third-order Fresnel lens was installed in the Cape Lookout lighthouse. On April 2, 1864, a small group of Confederate troops under the command of L.C. Harland snuck through Union lines and out to the lighthouse. Their attempt to blow up the lighthouse was unsuccessful, however the explosion did destroy the lighthouse oil supply and damaged the iron stairs. With iron unavailable during the war, the damaged sections of the stairs were replaced by wooden ones. The Fresnel lenses from all the North Carolina lighthouses were found in 1865 in Raleigh. The lenses were shipped back to their original manufacturers to be checked out and repaired. In 1867, the temporary wooden stairs were replaced when iron once again became available after the war and the original first-order Fresnel lens was reinstalled.

In 1873, the lighthouse was painted in its distinctive black and white diagonal checkerboard, or diamond, pattern. There are those who believe the Cape Hatteras Light and the Cape Lookout Light paint schemes were reversed. This belief arose since the Cape Hatteras Light protects ships from Diamond Shoals and should therefore have the diamond pattern. However, the daymark patterns were randomly assigned and there is no evidence to suggest that the Cape Lookout and Cape Hatteras patterns were switched. Diamond City, a community that once stood on the eastern end of Shackleford Banks, was named after the daymark pattern on the nearby Cape Lookout Lighthouse.

The lighthouse is part of the Cape Lookout National Seashore and can only be accessed by private ferry. During the summer, the Cape Lookout Light Station Visitor Center and Keepers' Quarters Museum are open. Though tower climbs were suspended in February 2008, the lighthouse opened for climbing permanently July 15, 2010. The regular season lasts from mid-May to mid-September each year. During the open season, visitors are allowed to climb the 207 steps to the top of the lighthouse.

On March 26, 2021, it was announced that The Cape Lookout Lighthouse would be closed to climbing by the public due to safety concerns. During a pre-season safety inspection conducted in January, officials found what they call serious concerns with the flooring, rails, as well as separations between the iron stairs and masonry, cracks in the iron landing plates and separation from the iron stairs and central support. The Cape Lookout Lighthouse Keepers Quarters Museum located near the base of the lighthouse remains open and the National Park Service expects repairs to be completed by 2025.

== Timeline ==
Historic Light Station information - North Carolina

Cape Lookout Light:

- The Cape Lookout Lighthouse was completed in 1812 at a cost of $20,678.54 and had one wooden and one brick tower.
- The station was described in 1850, when William Fulford was keeper, as having 13 lamps, new lighting apparatus having been installed in 1848. The keeper was obliged, in 1850, to keep wheeling away sand from the front side of the keeper’s dwelling to prevent the sand from covering it up. "The sand banks," the report reads, "are now higher than the tops of the windows; and only a few feet from them, at high water mark. On the sea side, it has washed away about 100 feet last year by abrasion and sea flows."
- In 1851 Cape Lookout Lighthouse was reported as one of nine coast lights "which require to be improved. The towers of each of them should have an elevation of 150 feet above the level of the sea and should be fitted up in the best manner with first-order lens apparatus, to insure a brilliancy and range adequate to the wants of commerce. These lights are not sufficiently well distinguished, but a general plan for all the seacoast lights will best accomplish this object."
- On March 3, 1857, Congress appropriated $45,000 "for rebuilding and fitting out with first-order apparatus the lighthouse at Cape Lookout, North Carolina." The new lighthouse was completed and first lighted on November 1, 1859. During the Civil War, in 1862, the tower was damaged and the lens, etc., removed, but by 1863 the lighthouse had been refitted and the light reexhibited. A third-order lens was placed in use temporarily until the first-order lens, "injured by the rebels" could be repaired and restored in 1867.
- The lighthouse is now a black and white diagonally checkered tower, 169 feet above ground and 156 feet above water and shows a group flashing white electric light every 15 seconds of 80,000 candela, visible 19 miles, from a first-order lens.

— United States Coast Guard

== Gallery ==
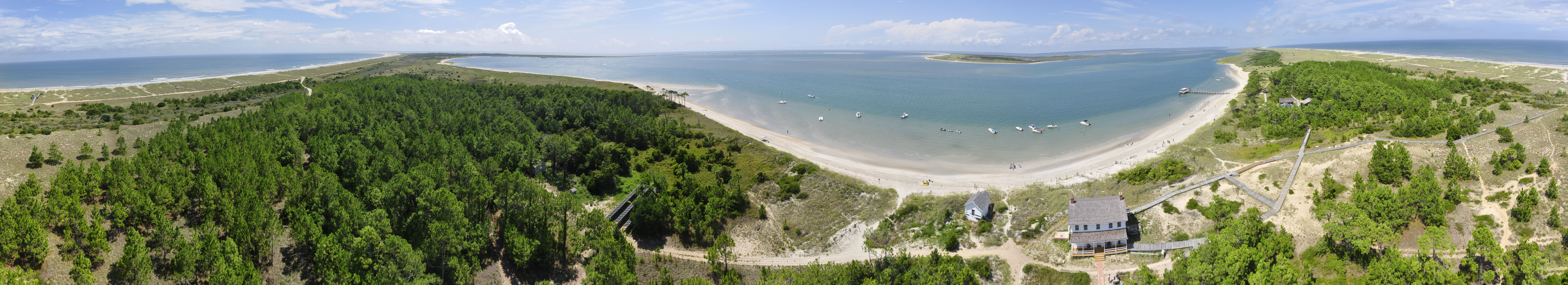
Panorama of the view from the top of the lighthouse
