= Hurricane Ophelia (2005) =

Category 1 Atlantic hurricane in 2005

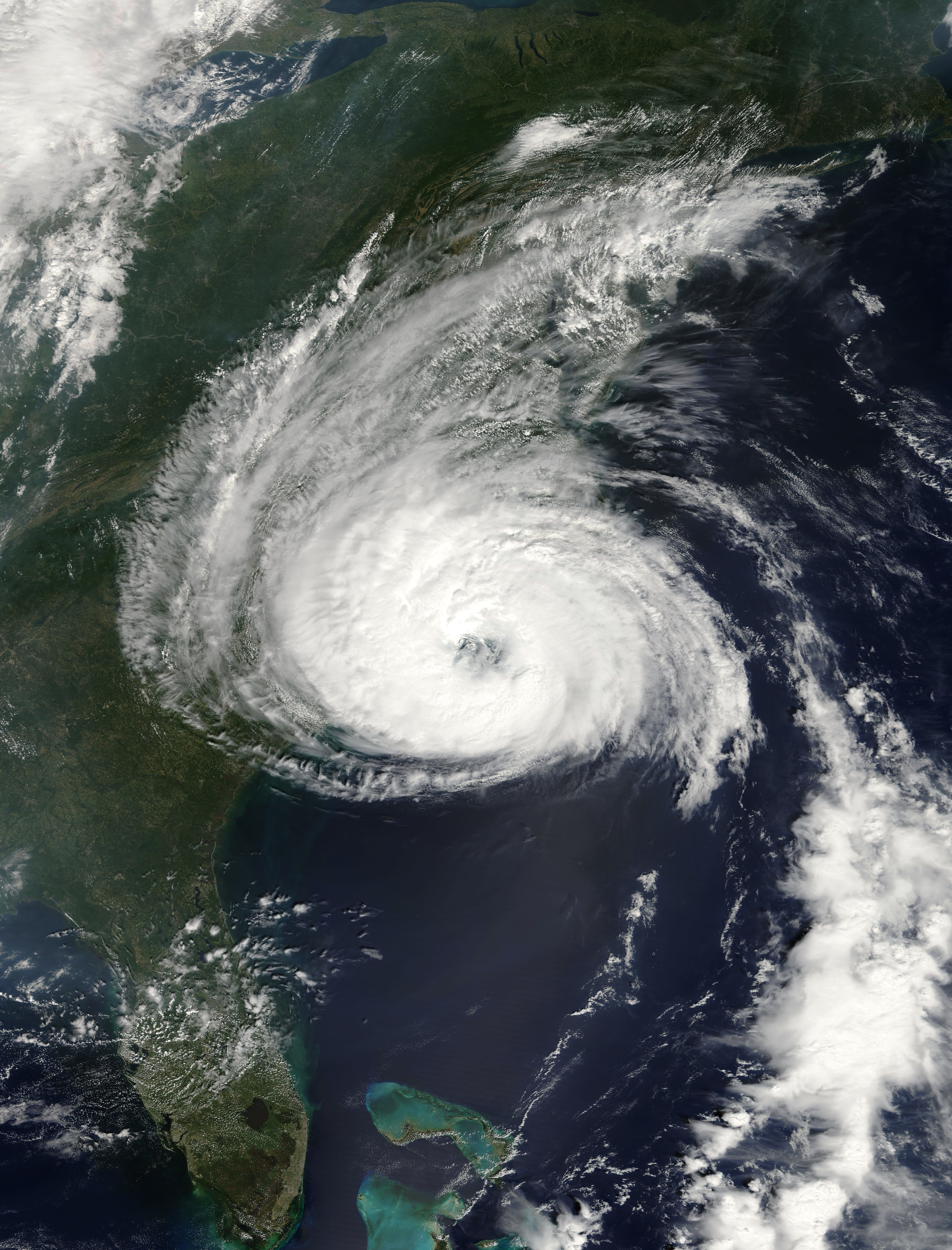
- Ophelia near North Carolina on September 14

Meteorological history
- Formed: September 6, 2005
- Extratropical: September 18, 2005
- Dissipated: September 23, 2005

Category 1 hurricane
- 1-minute sustained (SSHWS/NWS)
- Highest winds: 85 mph (140 km/h)
- Lowest pressure: 976 mbar (hPa); 28.82 inHg

Overall effects
- Fatalities: 3
- Missing: 1
- Damage: $70 million (2005 USD)
- Areas affected: Bahamas, Eastern United States, Atlantic Canada
- IBTrACS
- Part of the 2005 Atlantic hurricane season

Hurricane Ophelia was a long-lived tropical cyclone in September 2005 that moved along an erratic path off the East Coast of the United States for much of its existence. The fifteenth named storm and the eighth hurricane of the record-breaking 2005 Atlantic hurricane season, Ophelia originated from a complex set of systems across the Atlantic in early September. An area of low pressure consolidated near the Bahamas and was classified as Tropical Depression Sixteen on September 6. Stuck in a region of meager steering currents, largely dominated by a lull between two ridges to the north and east, this system moved along a looping course with a general northward trajectory. The following day it organized into Tropical Storm Ophelia and soon reached hurricane status on September 8. Over the next week, Ophelia's intensity oscillated between tropical storm and hurricane levels due to intrusions of dry air, varying levels of wind shear, and gradual upwelling of cooler waters along its meandering path. Gradually growing in size, the system reached hurricane strength for the fourth time and its peak strength on September 14, with maximum sustained winds of 85 mph (140 km/h). By this time Ophelia had completed a second loop and was moving northwest toward North Carolina. Changing direction once again, the system turned away from the state though its eyewall scraped the coastline for two days. The system degraded to tropical storm strength for a final time on September 16 as it began accelerating northeast. Becoming embedded within the westerlies, Ophelia transitioned into an extratropical cyclone the next day. Remaining on a steady east-northeast to northeast path for the next week, Ophelia traversed Atlantic Canada and the northern Atlantic Ocean before dissipating on September 23 over the Norwegian Sea.

Ophelia's erratic track prompted warnings and watches for a large swath of the Eastern Seaboard, ultimately a greater area than necessary. With the storm occurring on the heels of Hurricane Katrina, state governments were quick to prepare shelters out of an abundance of caution. National Guard servicemen were deployed to North Carolina while thousands more were on standby there and in South Carolina. More than 2,000 people used public shelters as Ophelia approached land. As the hurricane's core remained largely offshore, its impacts were significantly less than feared. Some coastal locales saw heavy rain, notably more than 15 in (380 mm) in the Outer Banks of North Carolina. The greatest impacts were felt in North Carolina, where more than 240,000 people lost power and more than 1,500 homes were damaged. Total monetary losses in the state were estimated at $70 million. (Note: All damage amounts are listed in their 2005 values unless otherwise indicated.) Extensive beach erosion occurred due to the hurricane's prolonged effects. Tropical storm-force wind gusts and heavy rain caused minor damage in Florida, Massachusetts, and South Carolina. Rough seas led to one fatality in Florida and left another person missing in South Carolina while rain-slicked roads contributed to a fatal accident in North Carolina. Atlantic Canada saw negligible effects as Ophelia's remnants traversed the region; one person died after falling from his roof while preparing for the storm. In the storm's wake, 37 of North Carolina's counties were declared disaster areas. The Federal Emergency Management Agency provided roughly $5.2 million in public assistance and the National Guard assisted with distribution of relief supplies.

== Meteorological history ==
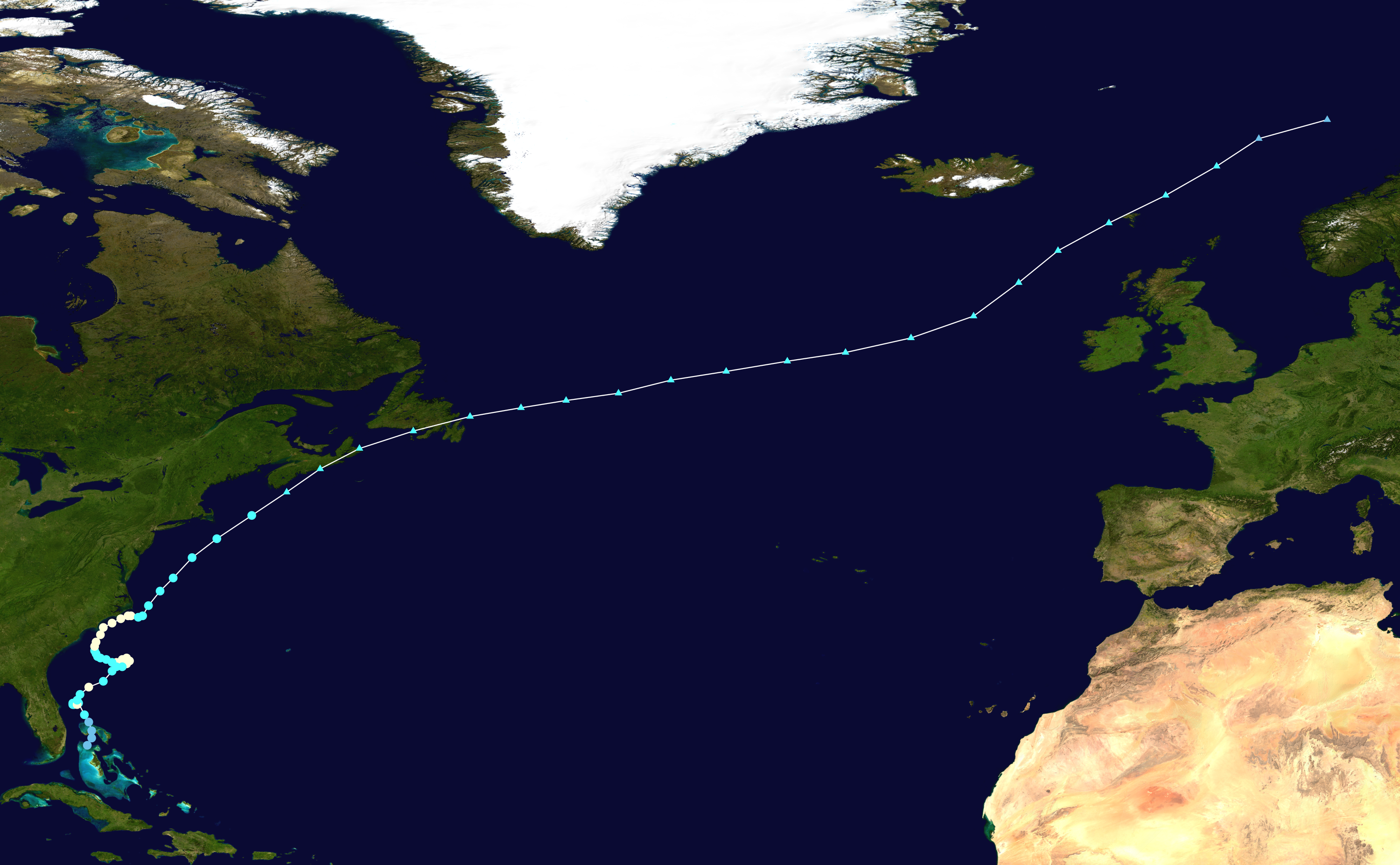
Map plotting the storm's track and intensity, according to the Saffir–Simpson scale Map key Saffir–Simpson scale Tropical depression (≤38 mph, ≤62 km/h) Tropical storm (39–73 mph, 63–118 km/h) Category 1 (74–95 mph, 119–153 km/h) Category 2 (96–110 mph, 154–177 km/h) Category 3 (111–129 mph, 178–208 km/h) Category 4 (130–156 mph, 209–251 km/h) Category 5 (≥157 mph, ≥252 km/h) Unknown Storm type Tropical cyclone Subtropical cyclone Extratropical cyclone, remnant low, tropical disturbance, or monsoon depression

=== Background ===
The 2005 Atlantic hurricane season was the most active on record at the time by numerous metrics, with 28 tropical or subtropical storms forming throughout the year. It also proved to be a ruinous year, with thousands of fatalities and more than $100 billion in damage. Above-normal sea surface temperature anomalies, averaging 1.8 °F (1 °C) in the western tropical Atlantic and Caribbean Sea contributed to the development of these storms. The Climate Prediction Center determined four primary factors driving the season's activity: the Atlantic multidecadal oscillation, the reduction of atmospheric convection in the tropical Pacific, record-high sea surface temperatures in the tropical Atlantic and Caribbean, and conducive wind and pressure patterns across the western Caribbean and Gulf of Mexico. Additionally, the El Niño–Southern Oscillation (ENSO) was in a neutral phase, lowering the likelihood of storms making landfall on the East Coast of the United States instead leading to a concentration of impacts farther west. September saw considerable activity, with five hurricanes developing.

=== Origins ===
On September 1, 2005, a cold front emerged off the East Coast of the United States and propagated southeast. The system became increasingly elongated into a trough over the following days, eventually extending from near the Florida Peninsula east to the edge of Tropical Depression Lee east of Bermuda. By September 4, two defined areas of low pressure consolidated along the trough: one south of Bermuda that would later become Hurricane Nate and the second near the Bahamas which would become Hurricane Ophelia. Forecasters at the National Hurricane Center (NHC) (Note: The National Hurricane Center is the Regional Specialized Meteorological Center for the Atlantic Ocean (north of the equator) and northeast Pacific Ocean from the coast of Central America west until 140°W.) described the dual lows as a "complex scenario" and stated that possible tropical cyclogenesis would be slow to occur. Initially drifting south, the latter system reversed course on September 5 as convection organized around the low within an area of favorable upper-level conditions. Based on satellite data and synoptic observations, the NHC estimated that Tropical Depression Sixteen formed around 06:00 UTC (Note: Coordinated Universal Time (UTC) is a standardized global time maintained by the International Bureau of Weights and Measures by which all weather observations are documented. Ophelia primarily remained within the UTC−05:00 time zone, with the offset from UTC being -4 hours during daylight savings time.) on September 6 between Andros and Grand Bahama. Winds at Freeport and Settlement Point reached 30 mph (45 km/h). Situated within a region of weak steering currents, the depression drifted generally north and later north-northwest, crossing Grand Bahama around 16:00 UTC. Wind shear displaced convection north of the broad center as it traversed the northern Bahamas. Initially, the system consisted of three defined mesoscale convective systems (MCS) spanning an area 120 mi (200 km) across, each producing areas of heavy rain. Throughout September 6, the MCSs congealed into a single spiral rainband and the precursor to an eyewall.

=== Fluctuation in strength and track ===
Early in the storm's lifecycle, meteorologists struggled with a complex track forecast as models depicted a wide range of scenarios for the depression. Some models took the system into the Gulf of Mexico and others kept the system off the coast of the Southeastern United States. The cyclone was stuck between two lobes of the subtropical ridge to the north as a strong trough moved off the eastern United States. The system became more organized on September 7 and intensified into Tropical Storm Ophelia approximately 115 mi (185 km) east-southeast of Cape Canaveral, Florida. This marked the earliest formation of a season's fifteenth named storm. This record was later tied by Hurricane Nate in 2011 and subsequently broken by Tropical Storm Omar on September 1, 2020. Becoming embedded within a broad trough extending from Florida, through Ophelia and Nate, and all the way east to Hurricane Maria over the central Atlantic, Ophelia executed a slow counter-clockwise loop. During this time it steadily intensified as banding features coalesced around the storm. High sea surface temperatures of 84 °F (29 °C) fueled bursts of deep convection throughout September 8. Following the formation of an eyewall and well-defined upper-level outflow, Ophelia intensified into a hurricane around 21:00 UTC on September 8 with sustained winds reaching 75 mph (120 km/h).

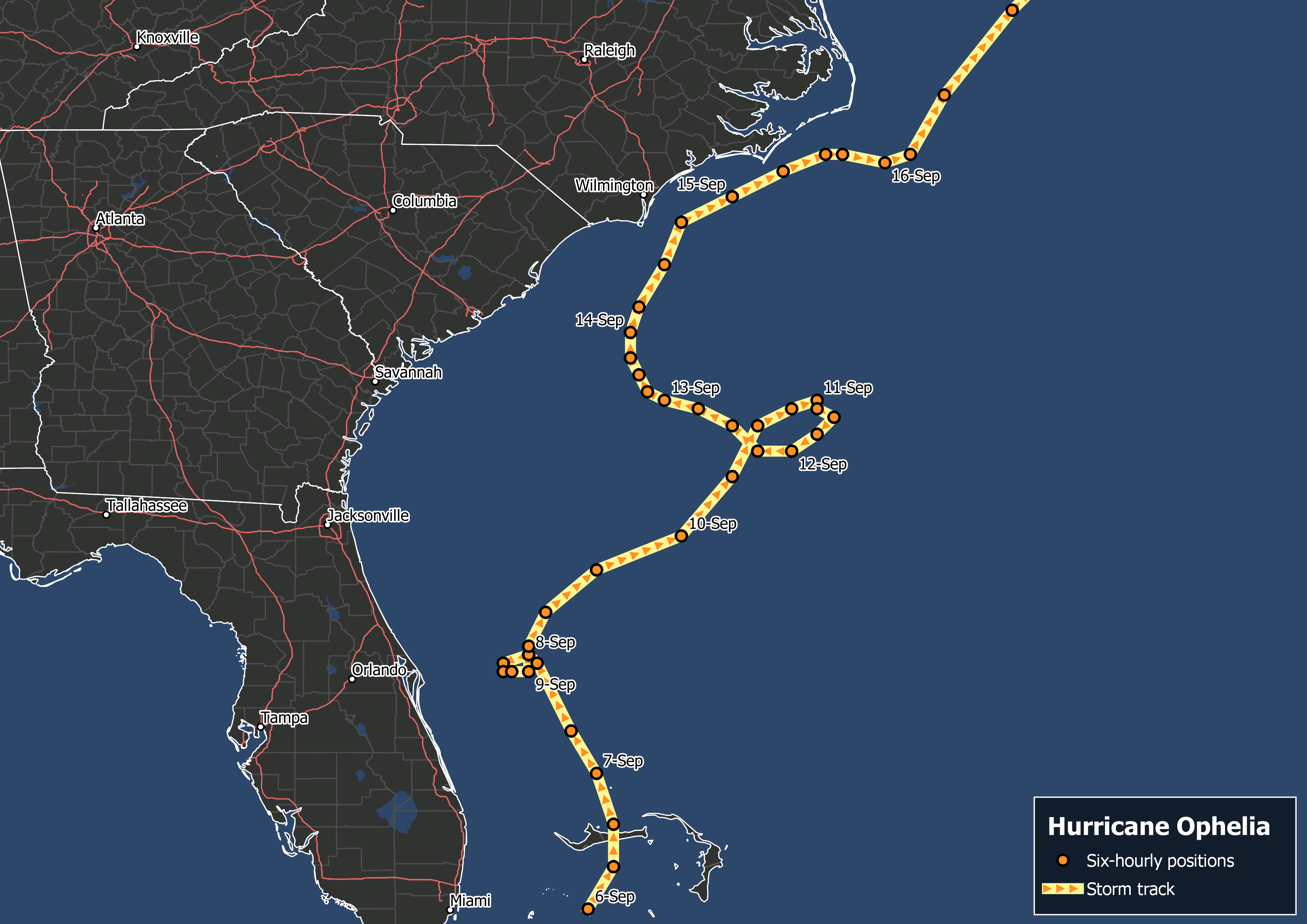
Hurricane Ophelia's track along the Southeastern coast of the United States

The hurricane's prolonged lack of movement resulted in the upwelling of cooler waters which in turn caused it to weaken back to a tropical storm early on September 9. Later on September 9, Ophelia began moving slowly northeast in response to a mid-latitude trough. The storm soon developed a 12 mi (19 km) wide eye and regained hurricane status around 18:00 UTC. Soon thereafter, increasing wind shear and intrusions of dry air into the hurricane's core caused degradation of its structure. However, Ophelia's structure once again improved late on September 10 with a 35 mi (55 km) wide eye developing; this coincided with it regaining hurricane status for the third time. Concurrently, it attained its lowest central pressure of 976 mbar (hPa; 28.82 inHg). Over the next two days the hurricane executed a clockwise loop within an area of weak steering between two ridges. Its slow movement led to further upwelling of cooler waters even over the relatively warm Gulf Stream. Gradual degradation of the hurricane's structure occurred as it looped back to the west-southwest, with meager convection unable to maintain vertical mixing. Sea surface temperatures beneath the system had plummeted to an average of 74.3 °F (23.5 °C) by this time, and with insufficient heat content convection within the eyewall collapsed. Slightly warmer waters farther from the center helped support a broken ring around the decaying center. By 00:00 UTC on September 12, Ophelia weakened back to a tropical storm for the third time. An unusual eyewall replacement cycle commenced with its inner core dissipating and a larger eye organizing around it; its radius of maximum wind doubled from about 30 mi (50 km) to 60 mi (100 km). This differed from classical replacement cycles as Ophelia never displayed defined concentric eyewalls, rather the inner one degraded as the outer one formed. After completing the two-day-long loop, the storm proceeded along a slow northwest and later northward trajectory toward the Carolinas.

=== North Carolina impact and extratropical transition ===
After remaining largely steady-state from September 12 into the early part of September 13, convection became increasingly organized as it moved back over the Gulf Stream. Maintaining a broad circulation, the storm's smaller core rotated erratically within it while the overall system progressed steadily north. Ophelia regained hurricane strength for a fourth and final time early on September 14. The system displayed an increasingly organized eye once again and expansive outflow aloft. The ridge previously halting the hurricane's northward motion began accelerating off the New England coastline; however, westerly flow in its wake would not be strong enough to induce significant acceleration of Ophelia. Accordingly, the hurricane began an "excruciatingly long passage" along the shores of North Carolina. Throughout September 14, the storm's eye expanded to a diameter of 60 mi (95 km). A more defined inner eyewall featured small vortices which enhanced the vertical mixing of winds. Around 12:00 UTC it attained maximum sustained winds of 85 mph (140 km/h), the highest during its existence. Over the next two days, the hurricane's eyewall scraped the North Carolina coastline bringing hurricane-force winds to these areas. A station at Cape Lookout measured a peak two-minute sustained wind of 75 mph (121 km/h) while an unverified gust of 104 mph (167 km/h) was reported in Davis. Ophelia once again became caught between two ridges on September 15 as it turned east. Over a two-day period, Ophelia's eyewall impacted areas from Wilmington to Morehead City. The combination of dry air coming from land and cooler shelf waters caused convection on the hurricane's west side to collapse; its proximity to the Gulf Stream enabled it to maintain convection elsewhere in its circulation. Ophelia pulled away from North Carolina early on September 16 as it weakened to a tropical storm for the final time.

The storm accelerated east late on September 16 as it became embedded within the mid-latitude westerlies. An approaching baroclinic wave over the Great Lakes also induced a northward component to Ophelia's track. Increasing shear displaced convection north of its center and caused its core to become vertically tilted. After a brief resurgence in convection, Ophelia began transitioning into an extratropical cyclone on September 17 as it interacted with an approaching trough. Its surface center became increasingly separated from the strongest winds and thunderstorm activity. During this time the storm made its closest approach to Massachusetts, passing 70 mi (110 km) to the southeast of Cape Cod. Ophelia completed its extratropical transition by 00:00 UTC on September 18 as it approached Nova Scotia. The system remained just offshore, with its center scraping the coast of Guysborough County in the eastern portion of the island. It then traversed the Cabot Strait before making landfall in south-central Newfoundland around 18:00 UTC with maximum winds of 50 mph (85 km/h). Ophelia traversed the island within six hours, emerging over the north Atlantic Ocean by September 19. The cyclone continued along an east-northeast to northeast path for several days as it spun down. Ophelia ultimately dissipated on September 23 over the Norwegian Sea.

=== Research ===
As part of their annual Hurricane Field Program, the National Oceanic and Atmospheric Administration (NOAA) conducts research flights into tropical cyclones to study internal mechanics and improve forecasts. Part of the Frequent-Monitoring Experiment under the broader Intensity Forecasting Experiment (IFEX), Ophelia was extensively documented throughout its lifecycle. As such, 462 dropsondes were deployed in the storm between September 6 and 17, the second-most in a single storm during 2005, only behind the 503 dropped into Hurricane Rita later in September. The Naval Research Laboratory in conjunction with NOAA conducted research flights into the tropical depression that became Ophelia on September 6. Additional flights were made as part of The Hurricane Rainband and Intensity Change Experiment (RAINEX). The multitude of recon flights during the developmental stages of Ophelia provided detailed data that supported the first in-depth study of the role of mesoscale convective systems in the genesis of tropical cyclones. As part of a joint project between NOAA and Aerosonde Ltd, an AAI Aerosonde unmanned aerial vehicle was flown into the outer bands of Hurricane Ophelia on September 16. This was the first such mission conducted into a tropical cyclone. Flying at an altitude of 2,500 ft (760 m), the vehicle measured peak winds of 85 mph (137 km/h). A concurrent NOAA Hurricane Hunter mission corroborated the vehicle's measurements, and the project was considered a success. This was followed two weeks later by the first successful Aerosonde core penetration of a tropical cyclone within Typhoon Longwang near Taiwan. The final research mission into Ophelia was conducted on September 17, focusing on its extratropical transition. A collaborative effort between NOAA and Canada's Atmospheric Environment Service, two recon missions were flown into the storm to study structural changes during this transitory period. This marked the first detailed dynamic core structure of such a system.

== Preparations ==
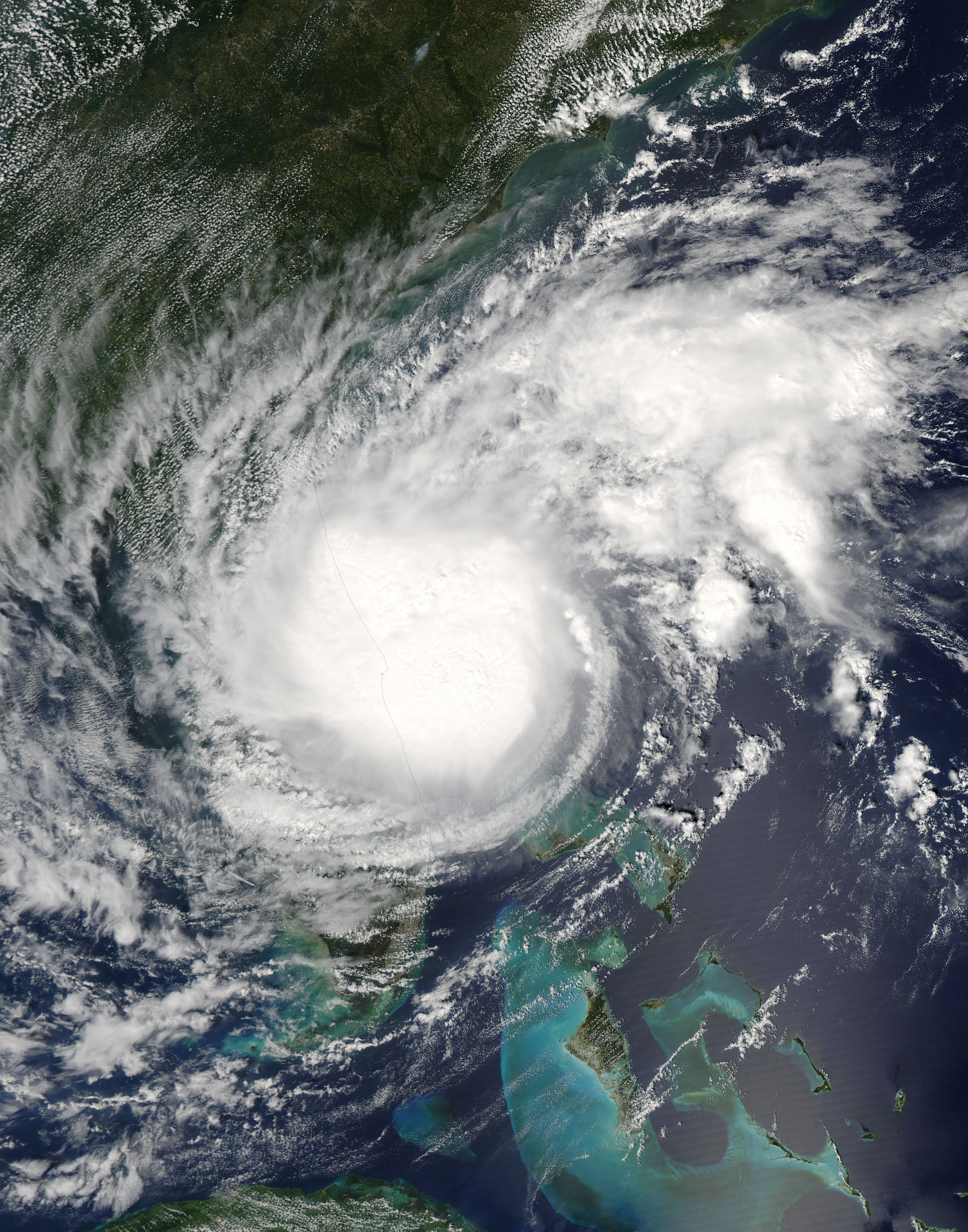
Tropical Storm Ophelia just east of Florida on September 8

Throughout the existence of Hurricane Ophelia, the NHC, Canadian Hurricane Center (CHC), and Bahamas Department of Meteorology issued numerous tropical cyclone warnings and watches between September 6 and 17. The hurricane's erratic movement led to watches and warnings being issued for a much larger region than necessary across the East Coast of the United States, with some forecasts calling for landfalls that did not verify.

=== United States ===
With gas prices already elevated because of Hurricane Katrina's effects in the Gulf of Mexico, gas prices fluctuated due to disruptions from Hurricane Ophelia. Prices initially rose in the southeast as the system was developing before dropping as the storm turned away from Florida. They later rose in Maine as the system impacted North Carolina.

==== Florida ====
Already suffering from a volley of six hurricane impacts since 2004, concerns were raised over Ophelia's potential effects in Florida. With an uncertain track, the main issue presented was beach erosion, especially in areas significantly affected by Hurricanes Frances and Jeanne in 2004. Ophelia was the first major beach erosion event to test the $30 million shoreline restoration in Brevard County. A public shelter was opened in Daytona Beach, Volusia County; only 13 people used the shelter and were relocated to a Red Cross facility. Schools in the county were closed on September 8 over flooding concerns. Fourteen ships departed Naval Station Mayport to avoid the storm. Florida Fish and Wildlife Conservation Commission search and rescue teams previously sent to Mississippi returned to the state. Mariners as far west as Tallahassee were advised of possible adverse conditions. Shipment of the Space Shuttle external tank to NASA's Vehicle Assembly Building at the Kennedy Space Center was delayed in order to protect the equipment. The tank was originally meant to be delivered to a facility in New Orleans but that structure was closed indefinitely due to damage from Hurricane Katrina. Concerns over flooding were raised in Polk County with areas already heavily saturated ahead of the storm. Pumping of water into Lake Rosalie was authorized by the South Florida Water Management District, but the pumps were unlikely to arrive in time. Similarly, water levels at Lake Griffin, Rock Lake, and Lake Irish in Seminole County were elevated and posed a flood risk.

==== The Carolinas ====
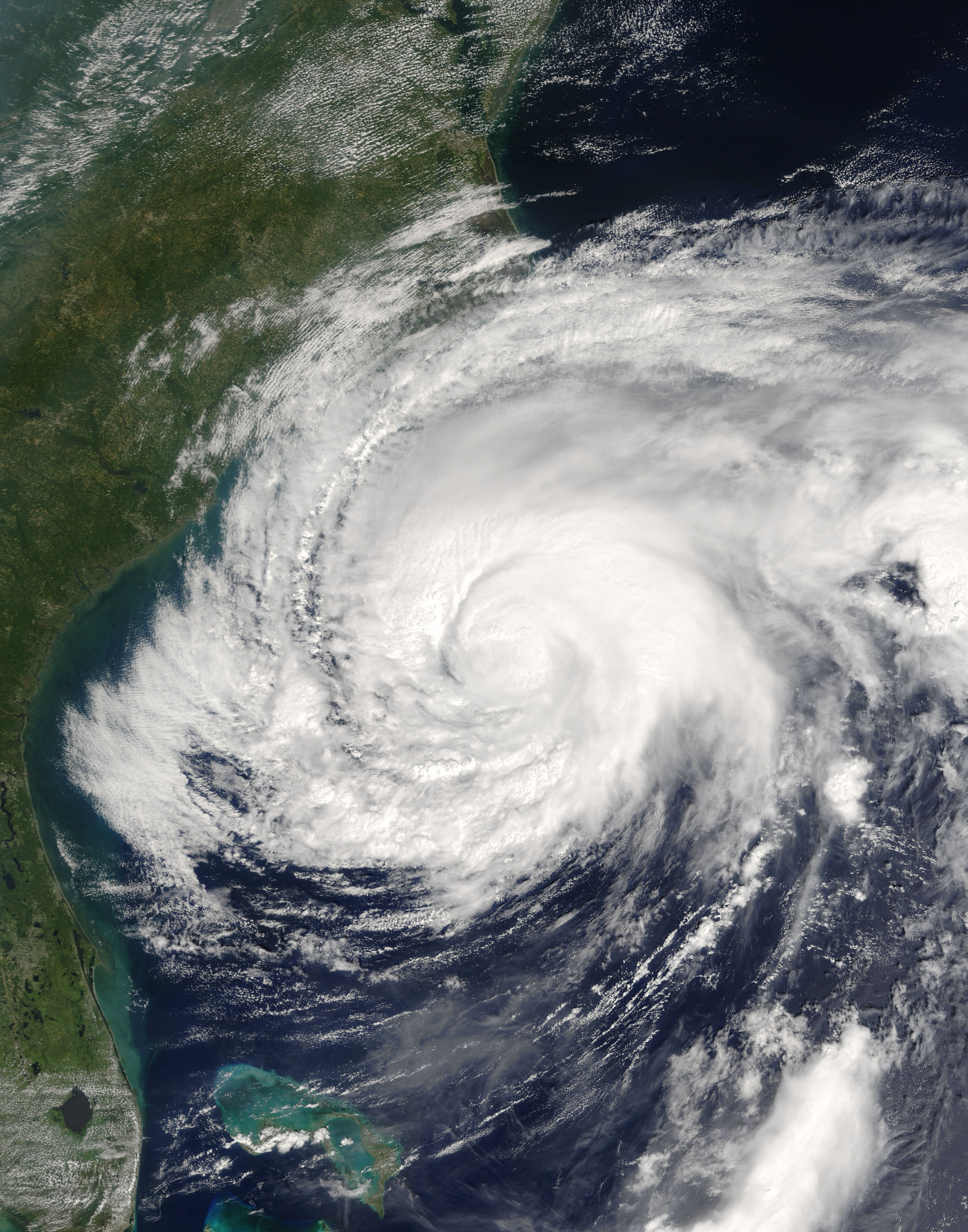
Hurricane Ophelia stalled off the Carolina coastline on September 11

The South Carolina Emergency Management Division advised residents in flood-prone areas to remain abreast of the storm. Forecasts on September 10 indicated Ophelia would strike South Carolina and local emergency management officials held meetings to discuss preparations. Governor Mark Sanford requested the Federal Emergency Management Agency (FEMA) suspend transport of Katrina refugees to the receiving centers in Charleston and Colombia. Any potential evacuees from Ophelia would be directed to hotels in the Midlands. Although 1,650 members of the South Carolina National Guard were already deployed on anti-terror missions and Katrina-related relief, 7,100 remained in reserve if needed. Eighty-five state troopers were deployed to coastal areas to assist local police. The Red Cross opened shelters on September 10 in the Lowcountry, but closed them the following day due to lack of use. Charleston County also opened public shelters before the issuance of any evacuation orders. Voluntary evacuation orders were issued for barrier islands, coastal residents, those living in mobile homes, and people living in flood-prone areas of Horry and Georgetown counties on September 13. The Red Cross opened three shelters across both counties; only 25 people used them. Statewide, approximately 2,000 people sought refuge across 45 shelters. Horry County officials revised evacuation procedures in light of the large loss of life from Katrina in the Gulf Coast, with emphasis placed on relocating poor, sick, and elderly persons. Schools in Georgetown and Horry counties closed while Coastal Carolina University and Horry-Georgetown Technical College suspended classes. Football and volleyball matches between Charleston Southern University and The Citadel on September 12 were postponed. The Cougar Classic golf tournament at Yeamans Hall Club teed off early due to the storm.

North Carolina Governor Mike Easley declared a state of emergency on September 10. Flood concerns were high along Pamlico Sound and the Neuse River where a storm surge of 6 to 11 ft (1.8 to 3.4 m) was forecast. Low-lying areas along the Neuse River in particular were severely impacted by Hurricane Isabel in 2003. Mandatory evacuation orders were issued for the approximately 800 tourists on Ocracoke Island on September 11. The decision was made at least partly in response to the effects of Hurricane Alex the previous year. Communities elsewhere in the state were uncertain whether or not to issue evacuation orders. Mandatory evacuations were issued for six counties, including Hatteras Island, while eight others had voluntary orders in place by September 14. Sixty shelters were opened statewide. At least 95 people used public shelters in Wilmington. Evacuations were ordered for a 20-block area of Washington that had flooded during Hurricane Fran in 1996.

Ferry service across the Pamlico Sound was suspended on September 12 due to high seas. Both of the state's major ports were shut down. Schools were closed across five counties on September 13. Classes were suspended at the University of North Carolina Wilmington and East Carolina University. The North Carolina National Guard deployed 300 troops to staging centers in eastern areas of the state. The National Guard was supplemented by 460 highway patrol officers, swift-water and urban search and rescue teams, and seven helicopters. Two warehouses stocked with two days-worth of food for 10,000 people were readied. FEMA deployed 250 personnel, a larger-than-normal response for a storm of Ophelia's intensity in light of the damage caused by Katrina. Progress Energy mobilized at least 900 people to restore power, including 600 supplementary personnel. Linemen originally sent to the Gulf Coast were recalled to the state and 140 additional workers from South Carolina Electric & Gas Company were provided. The United States Department of Energy deployed personnel to assist local services. The Brunswick Nuclear Generating Station declared an "unusual event" as a precautionary measure.

==== Elsewhere ====
Virginia Governor Mark Warner declared a state of emergency and activated the National Guard. On September 13, 23 F-15 Eagles and 90 personnel were relocated from Langley Air Force Base to Eglin Air Force Base in Florida. The Maryland Emergency Management Agency held daily briefings on the storm, though effects in the state were expected to be minimal. Concern was raised for the possibility of flooding along Chesapeake Bay. Campgrounds throughout Cape Cod were shut down for the duration of the storm. Food and water were provided to 200 people who were displaced by Hurricane Katrina and living at Camp Edwards. Counselors were provided to assist anyone stressed from experiencing another storm. In Chatham, Massachusetts, fishermen moved their boats to safety while the local harbormaster ensured docked vessels were properly secured.

=== Canada ===
In Atlantic Canada, residents were extra cautious of the approaching storm, primarily because of memories of Hurricane Juan in 2003. Debris from Juan remained scattered across Nova Scotia two years after the storm. The CHC initially forecast hurricane-force winds to impact parts of Nova Scotia, but later tempered expectations as Ophelia weakened on approach. The Halifax Daily News described city residents as "surprisingly complacent", with media broadcasts "[not] ...hyped up at all". Expected rainfall from the storm led to Nova Scotia's Department of Natural Resources ending a fire ban for western areas of the province on September 15. Nova Scotia Power, criticized for its poor response after Juan, placed hundreds of workers on standby and requested additional personnel from other provinces. Ahead of the storm's arrival, the Emergency Management Offices of Nova Scotia and Newfoundland and Labrador Emergency Measures advised residents to take appropriate precautions to protect themselves and property. They highlighted the recent devastation wrought by Katrina in the United States and damaging events in Atlantic Canada over the past several years. Residents across the region secured boats and stocked up on supplies.

== Impact ==
=== Southeastern United States ===
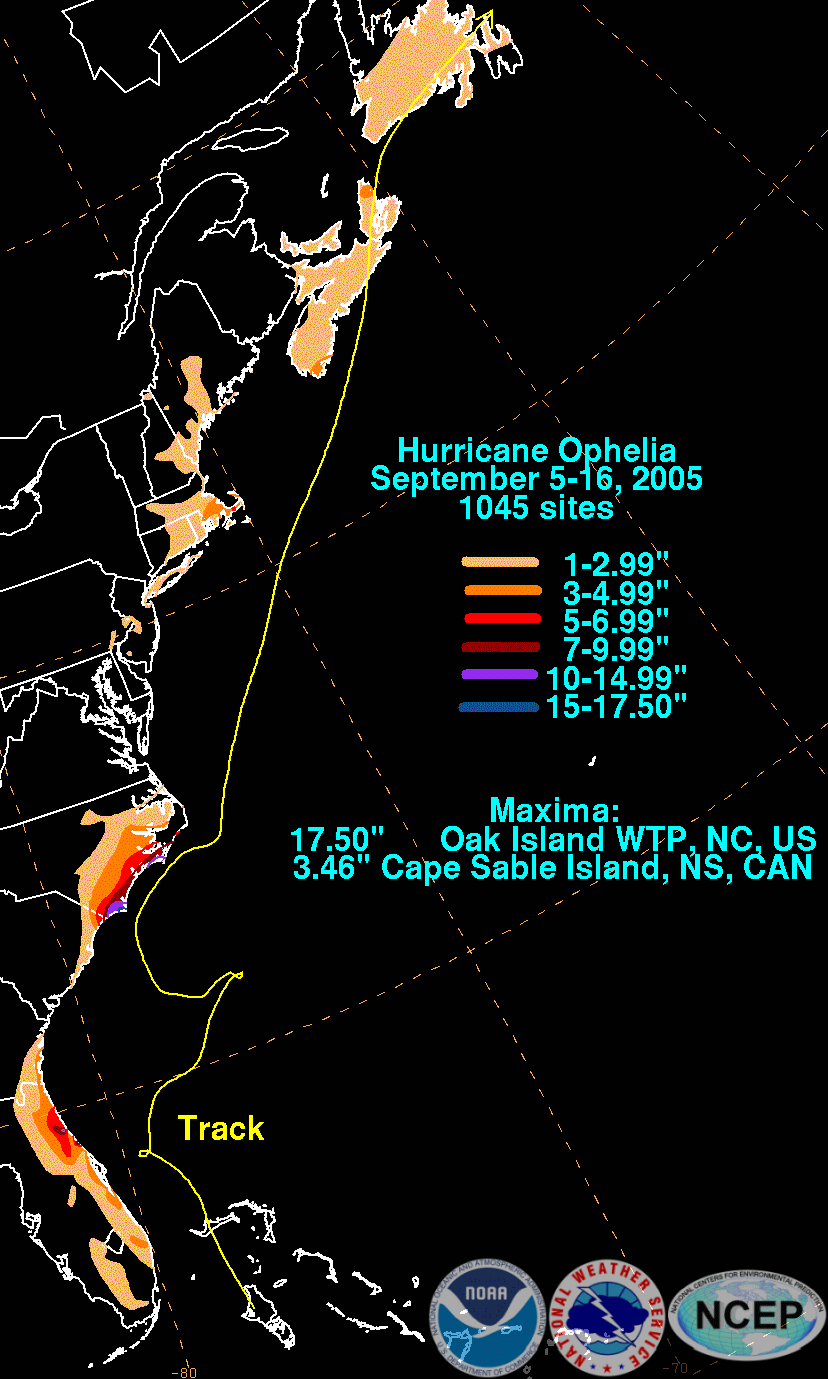
Map of rainfall totals across the Eastern United States and Atlantic Canada during Hurricane Ophelia's passage from September 5 to 16

Meandering off eastern Florida for several days, Ophelia produced a prolonged period of increased swells across the state. Tides generally reached 1 to 2 ft (0.30 to 0.61 m) above normal, with Flagler County seeing the most significant effects. There, breaking waves of 6 to 8 ft (1.8 to 2.4 m) caused moderate beach erosion. Water reached the banks of a canal in Palm Coast, with occasional splashes over the top on September 9. A portion of State Road A1A was undermined by erosion and closed near Flagler Beach. The Florida Department of Transportation used dump trucks to shore up the road with large rocks. On September 11, a father and daughter were pulled out to sea off Duval County; they were later rescued. Squall lines associated with the storm produced locally heavy rain and strong winds, with a storm spotter in Duval estimating winds of 62 mph (100 km/h). Minor street flooding occurred in a poor drainage area within Jacksonville. A peak storm surge of 3.03 ft (0.92 m) was measured in Mayport. A small area along the east-central coast experienced tropical storm-force winds, with a NASA station in Cape Canaveral reporting sustained winds of 39 mph (63 km/h) and a gust to 60 mph (97 km/h). On September 12, the body of a man was found in Palm Beach Shores near an empty boat; his death is presumed to be the result of rough seas produced by Ophelia. The entire east coast saw at least 1 in (25 mm) of rain, with accumulations exceeding 5 in (130 mm) in northeastern coastal counties. Accumulations were greatest in Flagler County where three-day rainfall totals reached 15.2 in (390 mm) in Palm Coast; this was the highest total from Ophelia in the state. Secondary roads saw up to 12 in (300 mm) of standing water in poor drainage areas in the city. The collective effects of Ophelia and six other tropical cyclones that impacted Florida in 2005 led to the addition of 20.2 mi (32.5 km) of critically eroded beaches and 0.2 mi (0.32 km) of critically eroded inlet shorelines. In South Florida, temperatures rose 3–5 °F (1.7–2.8 °C) above normal.

Effects from Ophelia in Georgia were limited to the immediate coastline, with these areas largely receiving 3 in (76 mm) of rain at most. Accumulations peaked at 3.15 in (80 mm) on Sapelo Island. Sustained winds at St. Simons reached 35 mph (56 km/h) while a minor storm surge of 1.87 ft (0.57 m) was observed at the Fort Pulaski National Monument. The National Centers for Environmental Information received no reports of significant damage in the state. In South Carolina, persistent onshore flow beginning on September 7 caused significant erosion at Hunting Island State Park. The outer bands of the hurricane impacted extreme eastern portions of the state (primarily Charleston, Georgetown, and Horry counties) on September 13 to 14. Several towns and cities experienced tropical storm-force wind gusts, with gusts peaking at 56 mph (90 km/h) at the Ben Sawyer Bridge. On the mainland, gusts reached 49 mph (79 km/h) at the Arthur Ravenel Bridge and 44 mph (71 km/h) in Charleston, Folly Beach, Myrtle Beach. The winds downed trees in McClellanville and Mount Pleasant, and some power outages were reported. Heavy rainfall was concentrated along the state border with North Carolina; accumulations peaked at 6.3 in (160 mm) in North Myrtle Beach. A peak storm surge of 2.81 ft (0.86 m) was observed in Springmaid Beach. Coastal areas saw minor beach erosion. Overall damage was limited across the state. A teenage surfer went missing about 200 yd (180 m) off the coast of Folly Beach. Rescue operations for the surfer were suspended on September 14 due to continued rough seas.

=== North Carolina ===
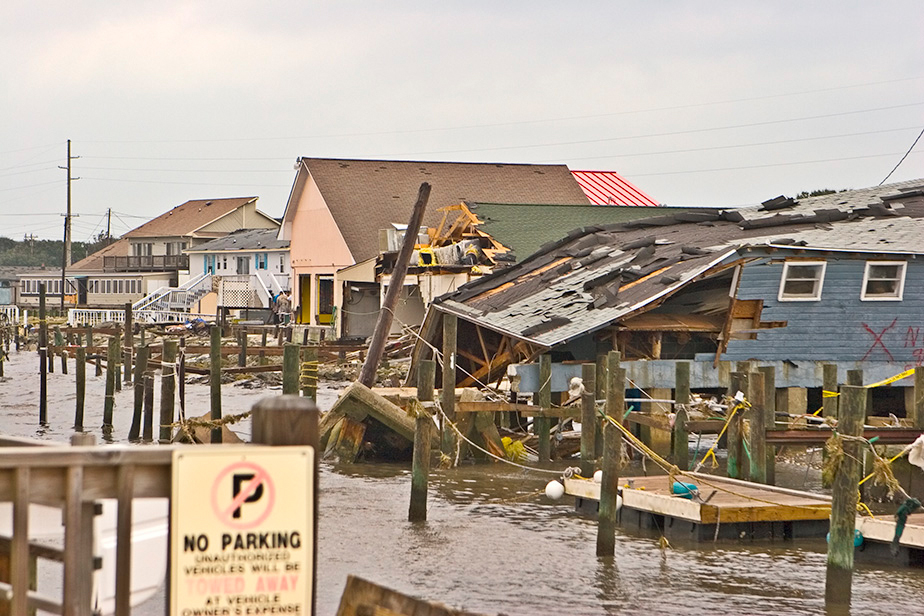
Numerous coastal structures suffered significant damage from prolonged exposure to hurricane-force winds and storm surge (effects in Bogue Banks, North Carolina, pictured).

Meandering along the coastline for three days, Ophelia was a prolonged rain and wind event for North Carolina. Despite its long duration, damage from the hurricane was less than anticipated. An initial insured damage estimate of $800 million, yielding an approximate $1.6 billion in total damage, was given soon after the storm. However, later assessments by the American Insurance Services Group gave an insured loss estimate of $35 million, yielding a total cost of $70 million. The National Centers for Environmental Information tabulated damage at $62 million. The state's agriculture industry suffered approximately $19.6 million in damage. Annual beach nourishment projects are credited with reducing the severity of damage from the hurricane. One indirect fatality was linked to the hurricane when a car hydroplaned on a rain-slicked road in Franklin County. East Carolina University political scientist Carmine Scavo indicated that as a reactionary response to Katrina, the state was "possibly overprepared" for the hurricane. At the storm's peak on September 14 to 15, over 240,000 customers were without power. By September 16, only 5,700 homes remained without power.

The hurricane's eyewall battered coastal areas from Wilmington to Cape Hatteras for up to 36 hours from September 14 to 15. Hurricane-force wind gusts with near-hurricane-force sustained winds occurred in these areas. A peak two-minute sustained wind of 75 mph (121 km/h) and a gust to 92 mph (148 km/h) was observed at Cape Lookout. A gust to 93 mph (150 km/h) was observed on Cedar Island. A six-minute sustained wind of 68 mph (109 km/h) and gust to 79 mph (127 km/h) was observed in Wrightsville Beach. Additionally, there was an unverified measurement of a gust to 103 mph (166 km/h) in Davis. Tropical storm-force wind gusts extended as far as 100 mi (155 km) inland. Offshore, the ship Sanmar (callsign V2EX) measured sustained winds of 74 mph (119 km/h) about 85 mi (140 km) east-southeast of Morehead City.

Persistent onshore flow resulted in the entire coastline experiencing a storm surge of at least 1 ft (0.30 m). Surge was greatest along the interior Pamlico Sound, especially along the lower reaches of the Newport, Neuse, and Pamlico Rivers; however, the peak coincided with low tide. A peak surge of 8 ft (2.4 m) occurred along Clubfoot Creek. The displacement of water left parts of the Sound's seafloor exposed. Ocean-facing coastlines of Carteret and Onslow Counties saw surges of 4 to 6 ft (1.2 to 1.8 m). Near Atlantic Beach, two cannons, an anchor, and other debris from the Queen Anne's Revenge were uncovered by churning waters. Heavy rain accompanied the storm's three-day impact, with the greatest totals occurring along the immediate coastline. Peak accumulations were concentrated in Brunswick County, reaching a maxima of 17.5 in (440 mm) at the Oak Island water treatment plant. Accumulations as much as 12 in (300 mm) extended northward to Oracoke Island. Trace amounts of rain fell across half the state.

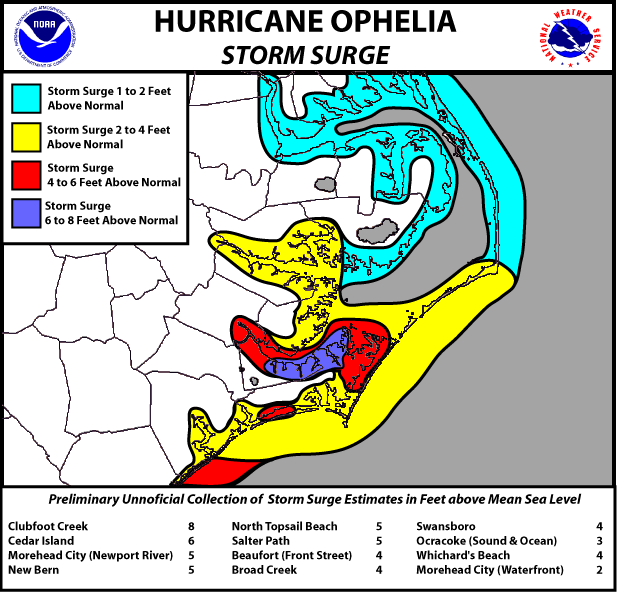
Map of maximum storm surge values in North Carolina associated with Hurricane Ophelia

Heavy rainfall across Brunswick County caused widespread flooding. At least 200 homes were damaged on Bald Head Island and floodwaters briefly isolated 15 houses during the storm. Floodwaters reached a depth of 4 ft (1.2 m) in some locations, rendering roads impassable. A 50 ft (15 m) section of coastal road was washed away in Ocean Isle. Wind damage was confined to eastern areas of the county and consisted of minimal structural damage and downed trees. Damage across Carteret County was primarily concentrated in coastal communities and barrier islands. Numerous docks and piers were damaged or destroyed. About 100 ft (30 m) of the 1,000 ft (300 m) long Bogue Inlet Pier was destroyed. Six homes were destroyed and 120 others were damaged in Salter Path. In Emerald Isle, 25 people required rescue. The county's beaches lost a total of 1,427,388 cubic yards (1,091,316 cubic meters) of sand, with Emerald Isle accounting for about one-third of this.

Wind gusts up to 84 mph (135 km/h) in New Hanover County prompted officials to suspend emergency patrols; however, police and firefighters remained on-call. Damage across the county reached $4.9 million, with barrier islands suffering the brunt of damage. A total of 636 structures sustained varying degrees of damage with wind being the primary cause. Coastal erosion was extensive, with Carolina Beach, Kure Beach, and Wrightsville Beach losing 25 to 80 percent of their beaches extending into the primary protective dunes. Septic tanks were exposed in some areas. At least 1 ft (0.30 m) of water covered a main road in Carolina Beach. A fishing vessel was stranded about 175 mi (275 km) off Wrightsville Beach amid 35 ft (11 m) seas and gusts to 100 mph (160 km/h) after being struck by lightning. A force main in the Hewletts Creek watershed burst due to an influx of water from the hurricane, resulting in a 750,000 US gal (2,800,000 L) spill.

Damage across Pender County reached $1.5 million, and was primarily concentrated in Surf City and on Topsail Island. Hurricane-force wind gusts caused minor damage to about 500 homes. Salt water flooding occurred along the backside of Topsail Island as water levels in the adjacent sound rose. Some areas of Topsail Island lost 25 ft (7.6 m) of beach and were gouged up to 4 ft (1.2 m) vertically. Eight duplexes were undermined by the erosion, potentially rendering them uninhabitable. On the mainland of Pender County, damage was relatively light, limited to some downed trees and minor flooding. A total of 388 homes were damaged across Onslow County, five of which were condemned. The Marine Corps Base Camp Lejeune suffered $1.2 million in damage, with the majority coming from the 300 ft (91 m) Riseley Pier. About 150 ft (46 m) of the pier was destroyed, and sand surrounding the support pillars was eroded to the point where the remaining structure was unstable. The pier was condemned in October and eventually slated for demolition in February 2010.

Minor wind damage occurred in parts of Craven, Duplin, Jones, and Lenoir counties. Persistent northeasterly flow caused flooding in low-lying areas of New Bern by September 12. Inland counties, including Columbus, Duplin, and Samson, primarily suffered agricultural damage. Little damage occurred in Dare County, with preliminary losses reaching only $19,500.

=== Elsewhere in the United States and Canada ===
Rip currents were reported in coastal Delaware on September 16 to 17. The combination of onshore flow and a full moon led to minor coastal flooding in Cape May and Monmouth counties in New Jersey. On September 16, water levels in Cape May reached 6.98 ft (2.13 m) above the mean lower water level. From September 15 to 17, moisture brought north from Ophelia interacted with a cold front, leading to widespread heavy rain in the Northeast. In Essex County, New Jersey, flash floods of roadways prompted water rescues. In Irvington, a local creek rose rapidly and inundated the Garden State Parkway with 3 to 4 ft (0.91 to 1.22 m) of water. Several streets in Suffolk County, New York, became impassible from swiftly moving water. In Upstate New York, heavy rain fell across the Adirondacks on September 16 to 17, leading to localized flash floods. Scattered thunderstorms, some severe, elsewhere in the state downed trees and power lines. Rainfall directly associated with Ophelia's passage in New Jersey and New York reached 2.4 in (61 mm) and 1.8 in (46 mm), respectively. Flash floods occurred in Fairfield and New London counties in Connecticut. Rainfall directly associated with Ophelia reached 2.57 in (65 mm) in Stafford Springs. Ophelia brought locally heavy rain and gusty winds to southeastern Massachusetts as it brushed the state late on September 16. Wind gusts on Nantucket reached 40 mph (64 km/h) while rainfall peaked at 3.62 in (92 mm) in Falmouth. Offshore, waves reached 19 ft (5.8 m) high. Maine, Maryland, New Hampshire, Vermont, and Virginia received minimal rainfall with state accumulations peaking at 1.5 in (38 mm), 0.89 in (23 mm), 1.84 in (47 mm), 0.6 in (15 mm), and 0.88 in (22 mm) respectively.

Meteorologist Ted McIldoon at the CHC described Ophelia as a "typical storm for [Atlantic Canada]." Heavy rain affected much of Nova Scotia while the strongest winds remained offshore. Winds in the province peaked at 50 mph (80 km/h) on Beaver Island. Only one power outage occurred, affecting 130 residents in Stewiacke. One person died after slipping off a ladder while checking his roof for leaks. Much of Nova Scotia received 1 to 2 in (25 to 50 mm) of rain, with a swath of 2 to 3 in (50 to 70 mm) across the center of the province. A peak of 3.46 in (87.9 mm) was measured on Cape Sable Island. In Newfoundland, over 2.0 in (50 mm) of rain fell over parts of the eastern region of the province. Farther west, portions of New Brunswick received up to 1 in (25 mm) of rain.

== Aftermath ==
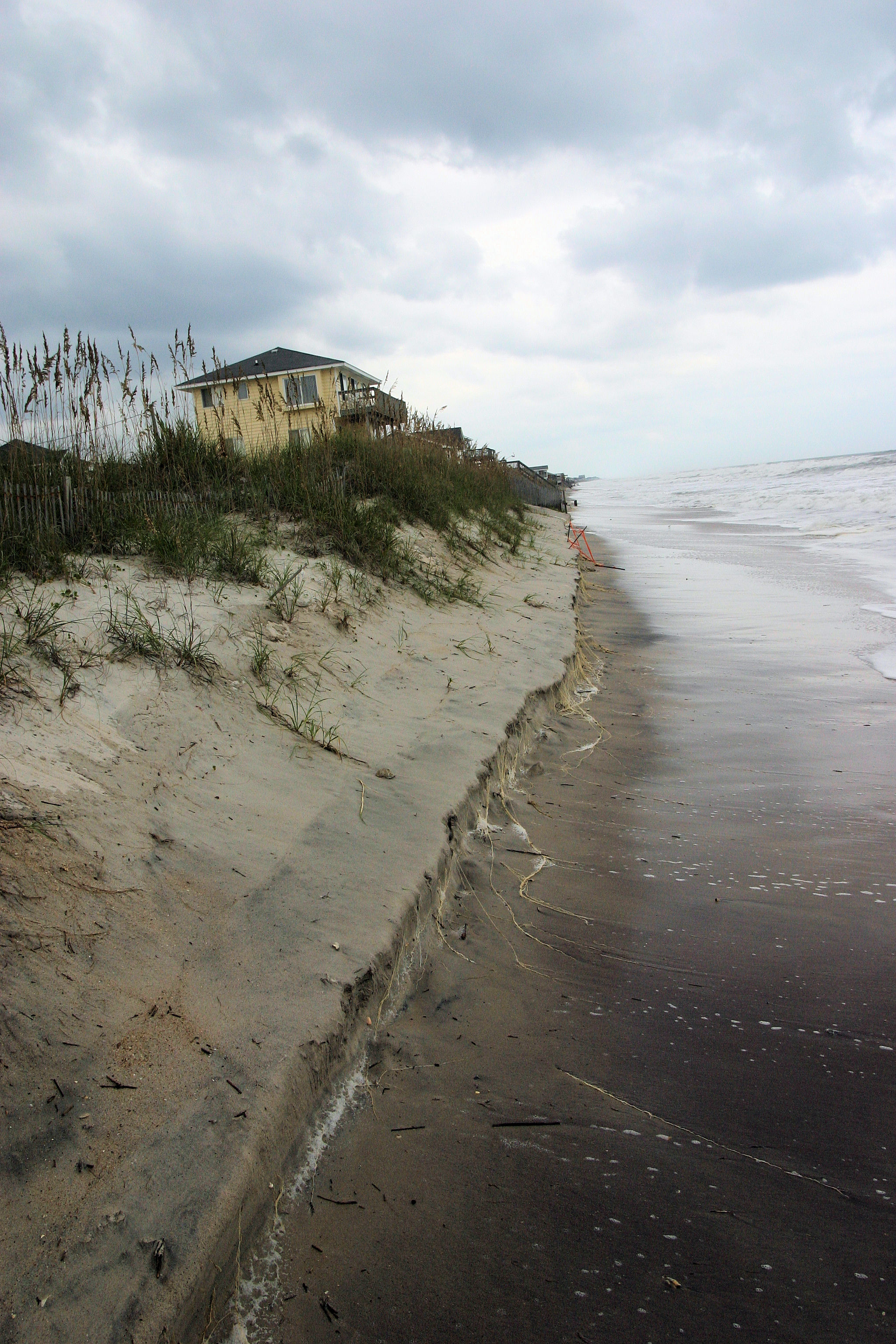
Large stretches of coastline suffered significant erosion in North Carolina, requiring extensive re-nourishment (erosion on Topsail Island pictured).

On September 15, North Carolina Governor Easley requested assistance from the South Carolina Government. South Carolina Governor Sanford signed an executive order providing members of their state's National Guard, and personnel and equipment from their Emergency Management Department. On September 16, FEMA and state disaster estimators sent out four teams to ascertain the scope of Ophelia's effects. President George W. Bush declared 37 counties disaster areas where damage was reported. Governor Easley requested government assistance on September 22 as cleanup costs and damage to public utilities exceeded $16.5 million. He later wrote a letter to President Bush on September 26 formally asking for assistance in Carteret, Craven, Hyde, Jones, Pamlico, and Onslow Counties. President Bush signed this request October 7, designating ten counties (the requested six plus Brunswick, Dare, New Hanover, and Pender Counties) as major disaster areas. FEMA ultimately provided $5,201,233.40 in public assistance to the designated counties. Of the 300 National Guard troops initially deployed in the state, 180 were relieved from duty shortly after the hurricane's passage. The remaining soldiers distributed relief supplies and aided local emergency personnel. The Salvation Army provided meals to 175 people in Morehead City. Band Together, a nonprofit organization, held a disaster relief show for victims of Katrina and Ophelia on September 21; benefits went to the Food Bank of Central & Eastern North Carolina. Construction companies in Carteret County were overwhelmed with requests to repair docks and piers in the month following Ophelia. North Carolina Senate President Marc Basnight and North Carolina House Speaker James B. Black suggested building codes be reformed for all structures to have windows resistant to 200 mph (320 km/h) winds. Basnight emphasized that "the kind of building that goes on the coast has to change ... [they] are catching damage each and every time."

With funding from FEMA, the United States Army Corps of Engineers (USACE) restored 11 mi (18 km) of beaches along Emerald Isle, Indian Beach, and Pine Knoll Shores, North Carolina, between January 10 and March 29, 2007. In total, 1,229,836 cubic yards (940,277 cubic meters) of sand was distributed at a cost of $13,773,768. The USCAE conducted additional nourishment projects around Myrtle Beach, South Carolina.

Ecological effects from the hurricane were largely minor. The influx of brackish water into the Emily and Richardson Preyer Buckridge Coastal Reserve negatively impacted the health of local Chamaecyparis thyoides (Atlantic white cedar) trees. The draining of swamp water into Beard Creek dropped dissolved oxygen levels and caused a significant fish kill event with an estimated 28,500 fish dying. A 2008 study on the effects of Ophelia and Tropical Storm Ernesto in 2006 noted a significant increase in Vibrio spp. populations in relation to their passage. Ecological biochemistry composition along the Neuse River estuary saw little disturbance; however, disruption to ferry services limited the sample frequency during data collection.

== See also ==
- Other storms with the same name
- List of Category 1 Atlantic hurricanes
- List of wettest tropical cyclones in North Carolina
- List of United States hurricanes:
  - Delaware
  - Florida (2000–present)
  - New England
  - New York
  - North Carolina (2000–present)
