= The Hurricane Rainband and Intensity Change Experiment =

Project intending to improve hurricane forecasting

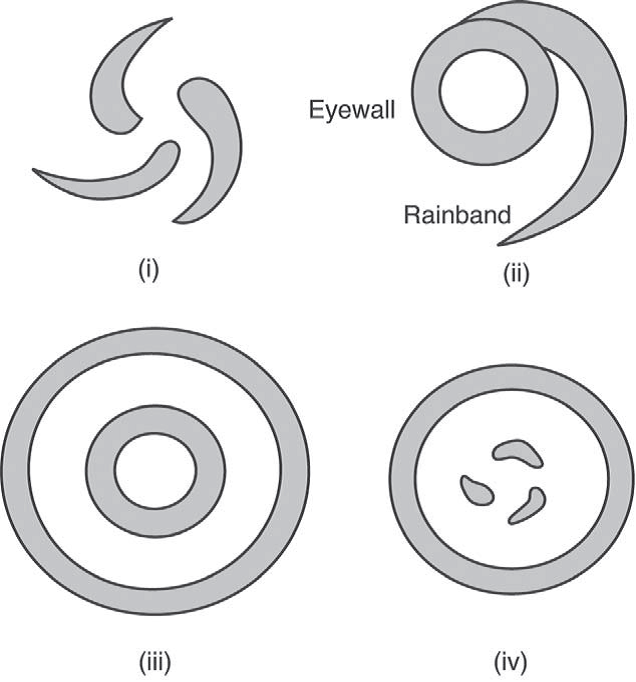
The four stages of cyclone eyewall replacement: (i) rainbands rotate around the center of a low pressure system (ii) distinct eyewall and strengthening rainbands visible (iii) rainbands form a new eyewall (iv) new eyewall replaces old eyewall and weakens storm

The Hurricane Rainband and Intensity Change Experiment (RAINEX) is a project to improve hurricane intensity forecasting via measuring interactions between rainbands and the eyewalls of tropical cyclones. The experiment was planned for the 2005 Atlantic hurricane season. This coincidence of RAINEX with the 2005 Atlantic hurricane season led to the study and exploration of infamous hurricanes Katrina, Ophelia, and Rita. Where Hurricane Katrina and Hurricane Rita would go on to cause major damage to the US Gulf coast, Hurricane Ophelia provided an interesting contrast to these powerful cyclones as it never developed greater than a Category 1.

The RAINEX project was a collaboration between the University of Miami's Rosenstiel School of Marine, Atmospheric, and Earth Science (RSMAS), the University of Washington's Department of Atmospheric Sciences, the National Oceanic and Atmospheric Administration (NOAA), and the United States Navy's Office of Naval Research. The objective of the research was to study the mechanism by which hurricane eyewall replacement cycle occurs. Luckily for the sake of the research, one such case of eyewall replacement occurred during the study of Hurricane Rita. In tropical cyclones maximum wind speed of the storm, which occurs at the eyewall, is a primary indicator of its overall strength which is important in predicting overall intensity. Just beyond this eyewall is a moat which separates the inner rainbands (eventually the outer eyewall) from the (inner) eyewall. Better understanding the dynamics of this region before, and during eyewall replacement could aid in better intensity predictions.

== Background ==
RAINEX’s main purpose was to accomplish this task via studying the fluctuations of storm intensity as they are influenced by interactions between the eye, eyewalls, and rainbands of a tropical cyclone. Previously, tropical cyclone intensity forecasting was heavily based on sea surface temperature and upper-atmosphere dynamics. These factors are useful in predicting the maximum potential of a tropical cyclone. However, since the intensity of a storm undergoes large daily fluctuations, the maximum possible intensity of a cyclone is usually not reached.

=== Hurricane structure ===
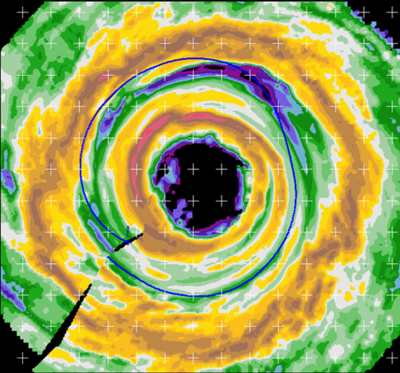
The structure of Hurricane Rita as seen by ELDORA radar

Most hurricanes exhibit a definitive eyewall and spiral rain bands outside of the eye. These spiral rain bands were known to be complex structures that possess deep convective cores enmeshed in low altitude precipitative clouds.

The eye or core of a tropical cyclone is characterized by low pressure which causes warm air to spiral upward and rise into the atmosphere. A tropical cyclone usually develops a distinct eye when the maximum sustained winds of the storm reach and exceed 74 mph. A well-formed eye is a good indicator of overall intensity due to an increase in rotational velocity when the distance between the moving particles and the center of the vortex is decreased. The angular momentum associated with the tropical cyclone can explain this phenomenon.

Angular momentum of a particle with mass, m with respect to the origin, r, can be given by

$$L = mvr \sin \theta$$

When r is decreased (the distance between the moving particle and the center of the vortex), the mass of this particle, m remains the same and the angular momentum, L is conserved. Therefore, the rotational velocity of the particle must increase. In tropical cyclones, when the eye contracts, wind speed increases. Another example of this intensification can be seen in figure skating. When a spinning figure skater pulls his/her arms in to their chest while spinning the distance between the skaters hands and his/her angular momentum is conserved but his/her rotational velocity, v increases.

== Experimental design ==
Three P-3 Orion aircraft were deployed during 13 flights into Hurricanes Katrina, Rita, and Ophelia. Two of the WP-3D aircraft were owned and operated by NOAA and were named N42 and N43. The P-3 N42 was equipped with a fore and aft fixed flat-plate antenna which served as a dual-beam Doppler weather radar. The P-3, N43 was equipped with one single-parabolic antenna which was able to operate as a dual-Doppler radar by alternating scanning direction (once again between fore and aft). These NOAA aircraft were able to attain 1.5 km horizontal resolution. The third P-3, NRL, was equipped with an ELDORA (Electra Doppler radar) and was the first ELDORA used in the imaging of tropical cyclones. In addition to the radars, each aircraft was equipped with a large quantity of dropsondes to be deployed every 5–10 minutes (about 30–65 km on flight path). During Hurricane Katrina, 302 dropsondes were deployed, during Ophelia 462, and Rita 503. A detailed description of dropsonde specifications can be found in Hock and Franklin 1999. The aircraft transmitted all of the information collected by these instruments to the RAINEX operations center (ROC) at RSMAS during flight in order for the ground team to forecast the development of the tropical cyclone while flight crews were in the air and afterward.

=== Equipment ===
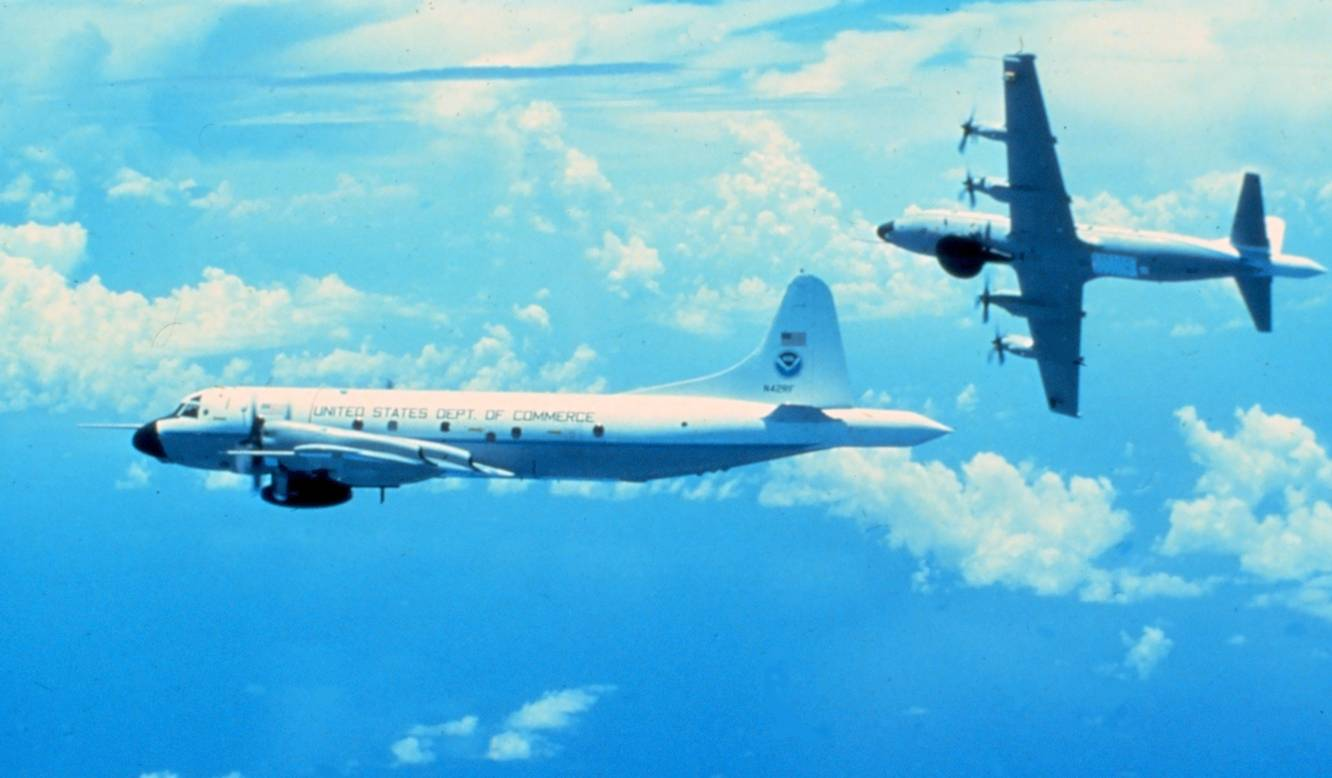
Two NOAA P-3 aircraft equipped with Doppler radar

The experiment entailed a high-resolution numerical model of the internal structure of the vortex and collection of data by three P3 Orion aircraft equipped with dual beam Electra Doppler weather radar and intensive dropsonde coverage. These aircraft were based at the National Oceanic and Atmospheric Administration (NOAA) Aircraft Operations Center (AOC) at MacDill Air Force Base in Tampa, Florida. All flights were controlled from the RAINEX operations center (ROC) at the Rosenstiel School of Marine, Atmospheric, and Earth Science (RSMAS) at the University of Miami. Postanalysis was to include high-resolution model simulations of the data collected in flight at the RSMAS atmosphere-wave-ocean modeling system.

=== Project communications ===
As data was collected in the field, satellite communications relayed the information from aircraft to the RAINEX Operations Center at RSMAS. In order to determine which days were suitable for flight, principal investigators, forecasters, pilots, and facility engineering staff held a daily conference call originating from the RSMAS center in Miami, Florida. Based on the forecast of evolution of the tropical cyclone throughout the proposed time of flight, principal investigators would develop a plan of flight for the day. Flight patterns typically followed one of two plans accepting special cases. Plan A was usually selected when aircraft were to arrive during a time without eyewall replacement. Plan B was employed when eyewall replacement was expected to occur during flight. For instance, during flight into Hurricane Rita a second eyewall was forming and Plan B was executed.

== Notable hurricanes ==
=== Hurricane Katrina ===
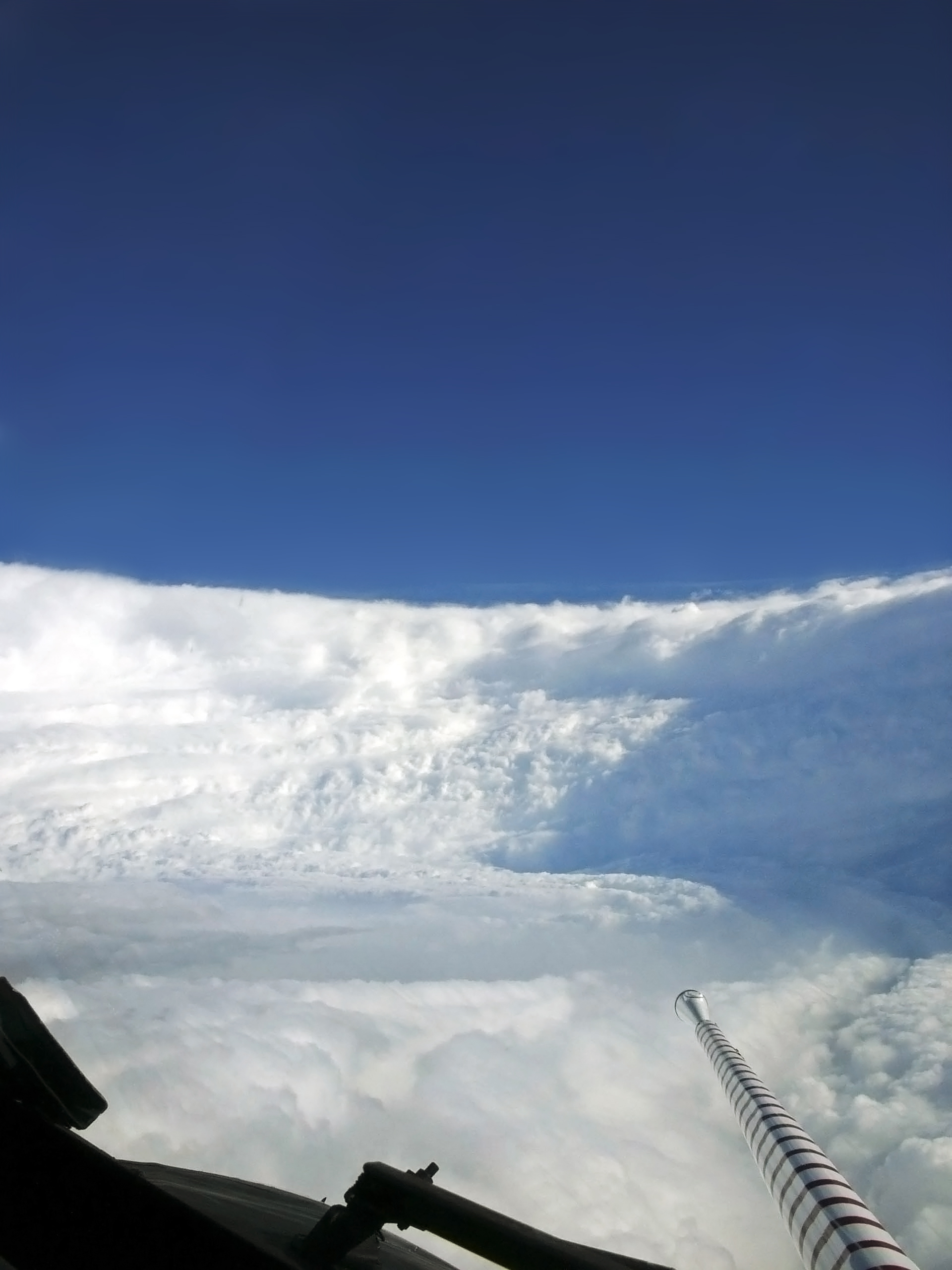
Aerial view from a P-3 aircraft inside the eyewall of Hurricane Katrina

Because RAINEX was planned in advance of the 2005 Atlantic Hurricane Season, it did fly in to Hurricane Katrina among other storms. Hurricane Katrina followed a very similar track to a later storm in this season (Hurricane Rita); however, Katrina did not undergo eyewall replacement during its time in the Gulf of Mexico. RAINEX flights into Hurricane Katrina occurred on August 25, 26, 27, 28, and 29, 2005. These flights followed the storm through its development from a tropical cyclone into a Category 5 hurricane.

=== Hurricane Ophelia ===
Hurricane Ophelia was an interesting storm to document due to its long duration and considerable fluctuations in strength throughout its existence. RAINEX flights into Hurricane Ophelia occurred on September 6, 9, and 11, 2005.

=== Hurricane Rita ===
Hurricane Rita in the Gulf of Mexico followed the devastating Hurricane Katrina. Hurricane Rita underwent eyewall replacement while in the Gulf of Mexico where the storm went from a category 5 on the Saffir-Simpson Hurricane Wind Scale to a category 3 storm by landfall. RAINEX flights into Hurricane Rita occurred on September 20, 21, 22, and 23, 2005. These flights observed the rapid development of Hurricane Rita from a Category 1 hurricane into a Category 5 and eventually through its eyewall replacement cycle and weakening.
