= Rainband =

Cloud and precipitation structure

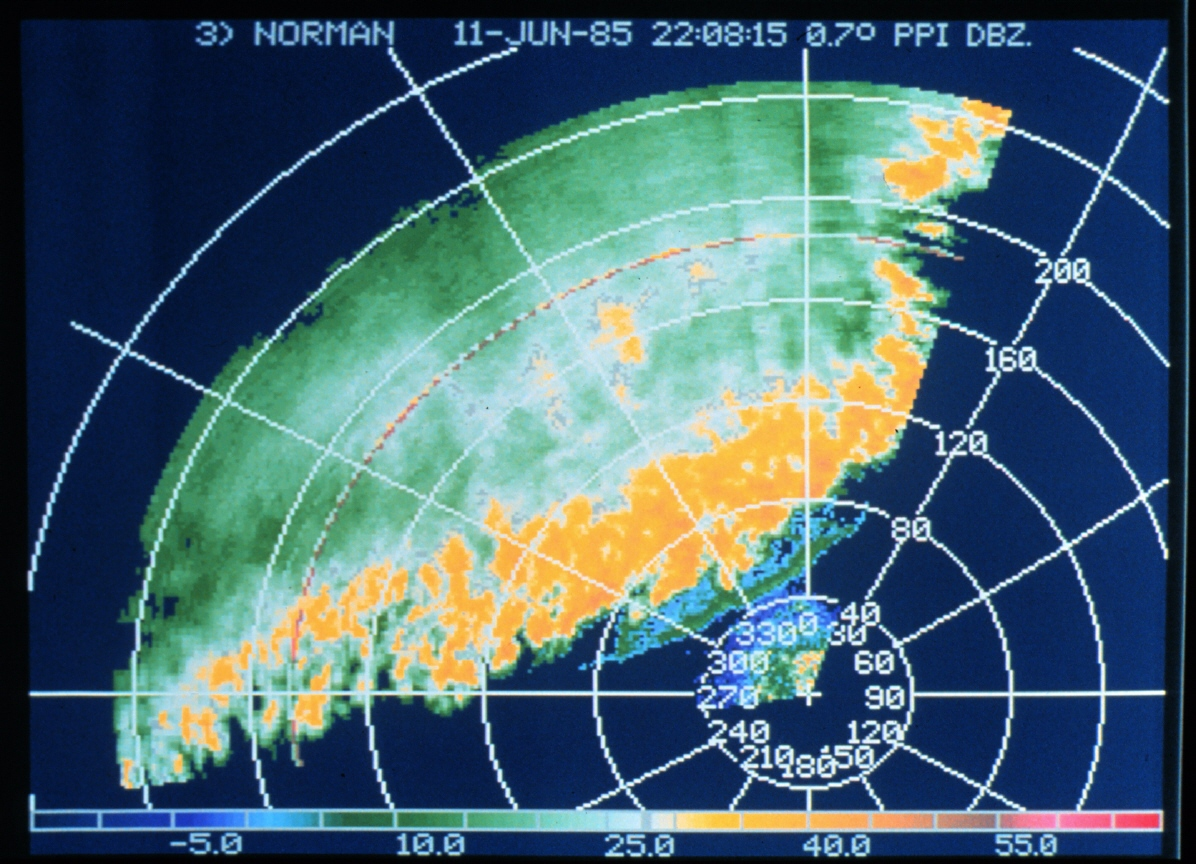
Band of thunderstorms seen on a weather radar display

A rainband is a cloud and precipitation structure associated with an area of rainfall which is significantly elongated. Rainbands in tropical cyclones can be either stratiform or convective and are curved in shape. They consist of showers and thunderstorms, and along with the eyewall and the eye, they make up a tropical cyclone. The extent of rainbands around a tropical cyclone can help determine the cyclone's intensity.

Rainbands spawned near and ahead of cold fronts can be squall lines which are able to produce tornadoes. Rainbands associated with cold fronts can be warped by mountain barriers perpendicular to the front's orientation due to the formation of a low-level barrier jet. Bands of thunderstorms can form with sea breeze and land breeze boundaries, if enough moisture is present. If sea breeze rainbands become active enough just ahead of a cold front, they can mask the location of the cold front itself. Banding within the comma head precipitation pattern of an extratropical cyclone can yield significant amounts of rain or snow. Behind extratropical cyclones, rainbands can form downwind of relative warm bodies of water such as the Great Lakes. If the atmosphere is cold enough, these rainbands can yield heavy snow.

== Extratropical cyclones ==
A February 24, 2007 radar image of a large extratropical cyclonic storm system at its peak over the central United States. Note the band of thunderstorms along its trailing cold front.

Rainbands in advance of warm occluded fronts and warm fronts are associated with weak upward motion, and tend to be wide and stratiform in nature. In an atmosphere with rich low level moisture and vertical wind shear, narrow, convective rainbands known as squall lines form generally in the cyclone's warm sector, ahead of strong cold fronts associated with extratropical cyclones. Wider rain bands can occur behind cold fronts, which tend to have more stratiform, and less convective, precipitation. Within the cold sector north to northwest of a cyclone center, in colder cyclones, small scale, or mesoscale, bands of heavy snow can occur within a cyclone's comma head precipitation pattern with a width of 32 kilometres (20 mi) to 80 kilometres (50 mi). These bands in the comma head are associated with areas of frontogensis, or zones of strengthening temperature contrast. Southwest of extratropical cyclones, curved flow bringing cold air across the relatively warm Great Lakes can lead to narrow lake-effect snow bands which bring significant localized snowfall.

=== Narrow cold-frontal rainband ===
A narrow cold-frontal rainband (NCFR) is a characteristic of particularly sharp cold frontal boundaries. These can usually be seen very easily on satellite photos. NCFRs are typically accompanied by strong gusty winds and brief but intense rainfall. Convection may or may not occur depending on the stability of the air mass being lifted by the front. Such fronts usually are also marked by a sharp wind shift and temperature drop.

== Tropical cyclones ==
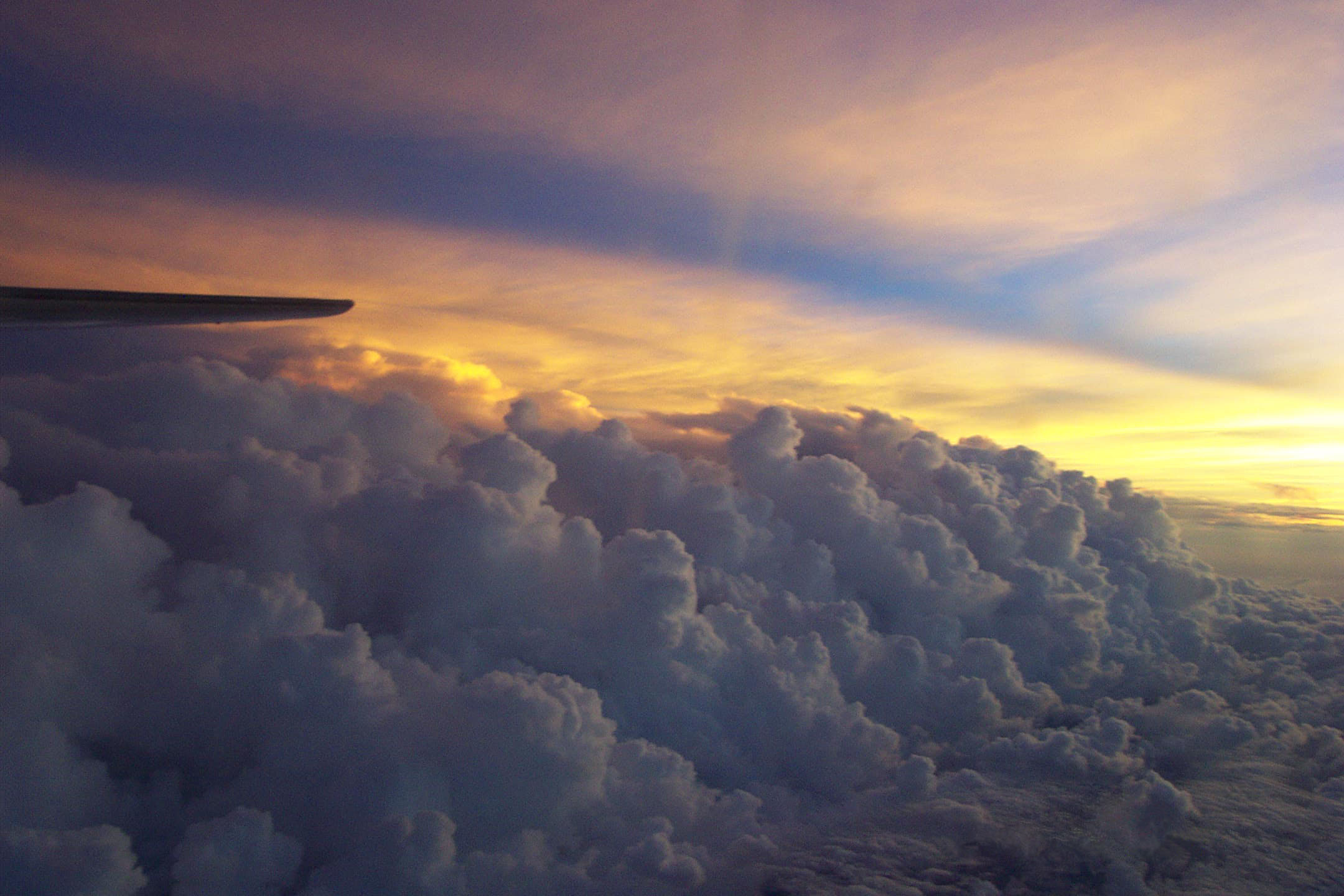
Photograph of rainbands in Hurricane Isidore

Rainbands exist in the periphery of tropical cyclones, which point towards the cyclone's center of low pressure. Rainbands within tropical cyclones require ample moisture and a low level pool of cooler air. Bands located 80 kilometres (50 mi) to 150 kilometres (93 mi) from a cyclone's center migrate outward. They are capable of producing heavy rains and squalls of wind, as well as tornadoes, particularly in the storm's right-front quadrant.

Some rainbands move closer to the center, forming a secondary, or outer, eyewall within intense hurricanes. Spiral rainbands are such a basic structure to a tropical cyclone that in most tropical cyclone basins, use of the satellite-based Dvorak technique is the primary method used to determine a tropical cyclone's maximum sustained winds. Within this method, the extent of spiral banding and difference in temperature between the eye and eyewall is used to assign a maximum sustained wind and a central pressure. Central pressure values for their centers of low pressure derived from this technique are approximate.

Different programs have been studying these rainbands, including the Hurricane Rainband and Intensity Change Experiment.

== Forced by geography ==
Convective rainbands can form parallel to terrain on its windward side, due to lee waves triggered by hills just upstream of the cloud's formation. Their spacing is normally 5 kilometres (3.1 mi) to 10 kilometres (6.2 mi) apart. When bands of precipitation near frontal zones approach steep topography, a low-level barrier jet stream forms parallel to and just prior to the mountain ridge, which slows down the frontal rainband just prior to the mountain barrier. If enough moisture is present, sea breeze and land breeze fronts can form convective rainbands. Sea breeze front thunderstorm lines can become strong enough to mask the location of an approaching cold front by evening. The edge of ocean currents can lead to the development of thunderstorm bands due to heat differential at this interface. Downwind of islands, bands of showers and thunderstorms can develop due to low level wind convergence downwind of the island edges. Offshore California, this has been noted in the wake of cold fronts.
