= Eye (cyclone) =

Center of a tropical cyclone

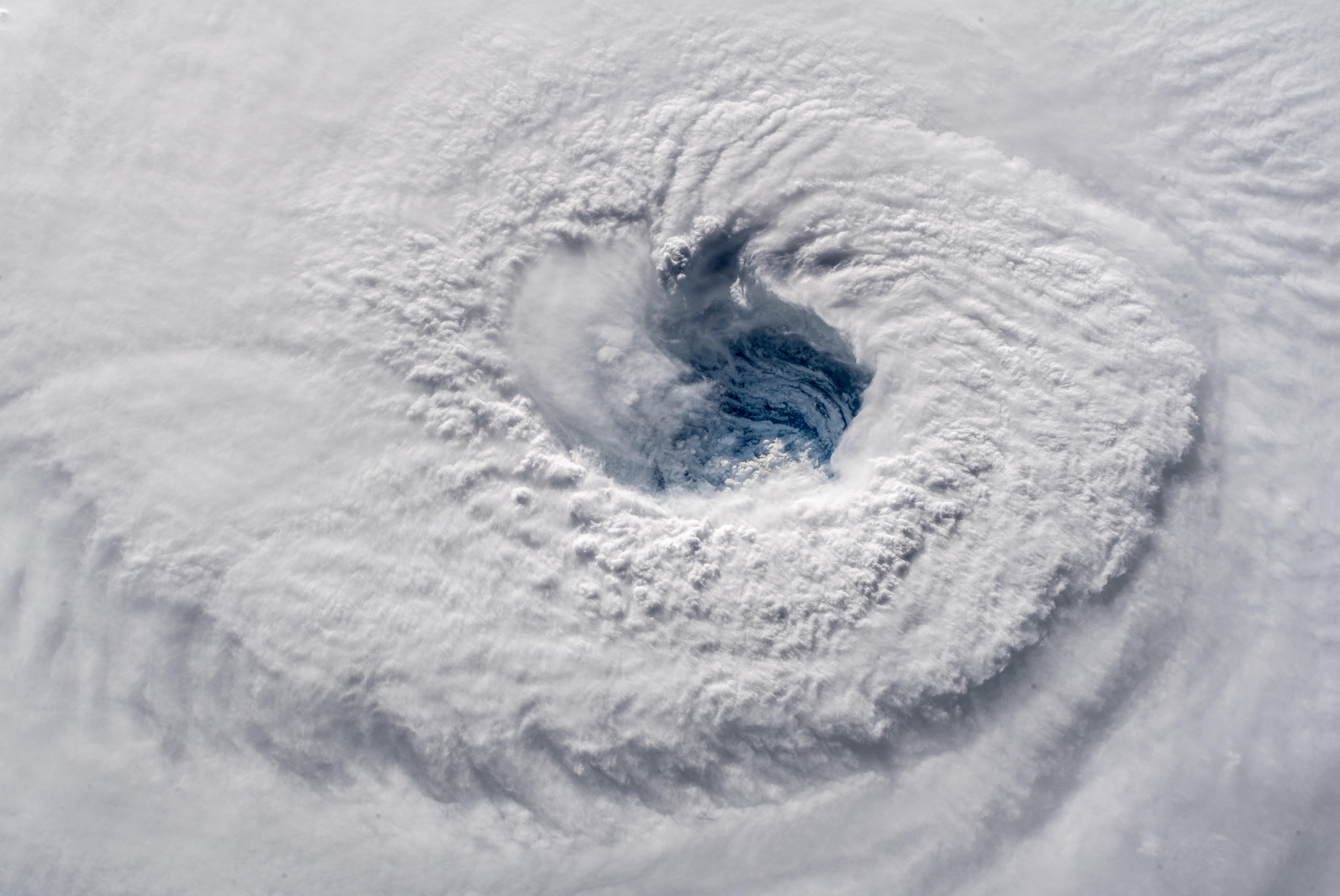
Hurricane Florence showing a well-defined eye at the center of the storm as seen from the International Space Station

The eye is a region of mostly calm weather at the center of a tropical cyclone. The eye of a storm is a roughly circular area, typically 30–65 kilometers (19–40 miles; 16–35 nautical miles) in diameter. It is surrounded by the eyewall, a ring of towering thunderstorms where the most severe weather and highest winds of the cyclone occur. The cyclone's lowest barometric pressure occurs in the eye and can be as much as 15 percent lower than the pressure outside the storm.

In strong tropical cyclones, the eye is characterized by light winds and clear skies, surrounded on all sides by a towering, symmetric eyewall. In weaker tropical cyclones, the eye is less well defined and can be covered by the central dense overcast, an area of high, thick clouds that show up brightly on satellite imagery. Weaker or disorganized storms may also feature an eyewall that does not completely encircle the eye, have an eye that features heavy rain, or lack an eye altogether. In all storms, however, if an eye is present, it is where the barometer reading is lowest.

== Structure ==
Cross section of a mature tropical cyclone

A typical tropical cyclone has an eye approximately 30–65 km (20–40 mi) across at the geometric center of the storm. The eye may be clear or have spotty low clouds (a clear eye), it may be filled with low- and mid-level clouds (a filled eye), or it may be obscured by the central dense overcast. There is, however, very little wind and rain, especially near the center. This is in stark contrast to conditions in the eyewall, which contains the storm's strongest winds. Due to the mechanics of a tropical cyclone, the eye and the air directly above it are warmer than their surroundings.

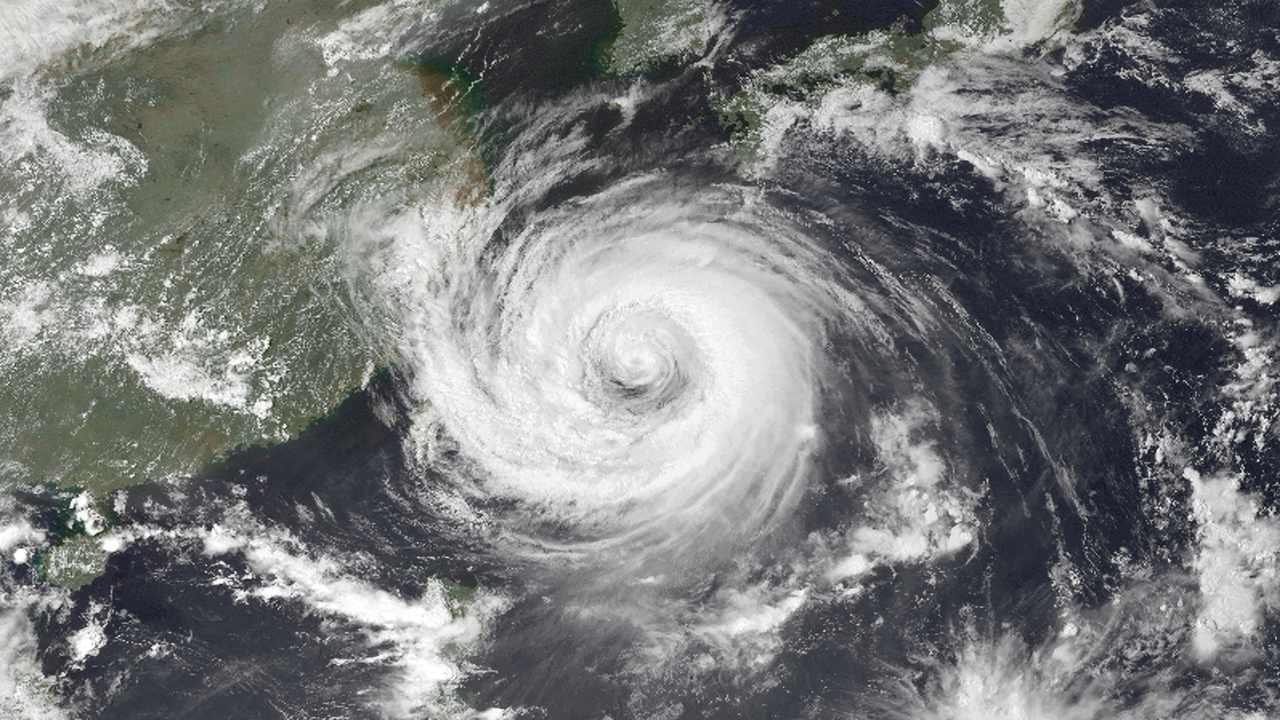
Typhoon Winnie is tied with Typhoon Carmen for the largest eye on record at 200 miles (320 km).

While normally pretty symmetric, eyes can be oblong and irregular, especially in weakening storms. A large ragged eye is a non-circular eye which appears fragmented, and is an indicator of a weak or weakening tropical cyclone. An open eye is an eye which can be circular, but the eyewall does not completely encircle the eye, also indicating a weakening, moisture-deprived cyclone or a weak but strengthening one. Both of these observations are used to estimate the intensity of tropical cyclones via Dvorak analysis. Eyewalls are typically circular; however, distinctly polygonal shapes ranging from triangles to hexagons occasionally occur.

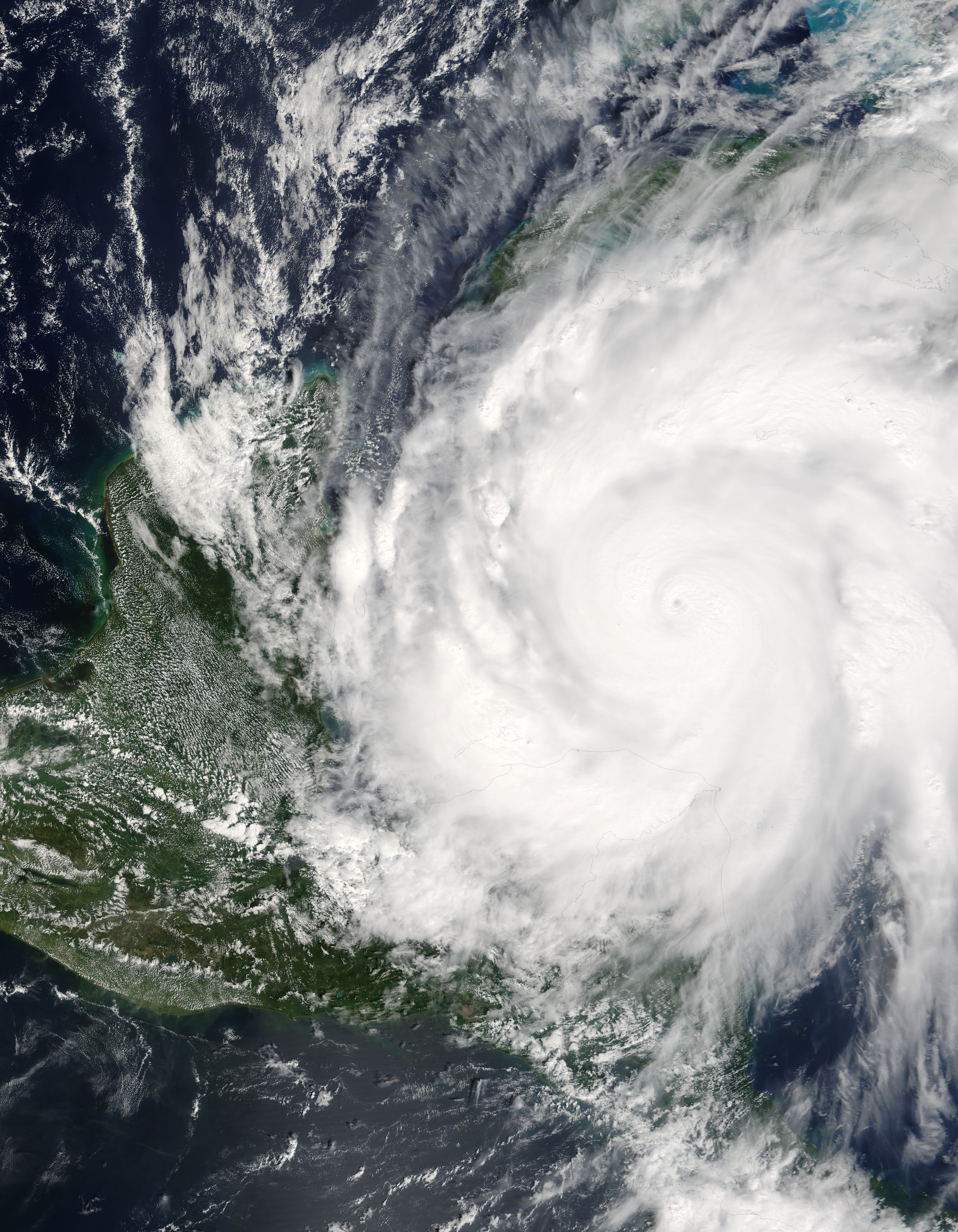
Hurricane Wilma with a pinhole eye

While typical mature storms have eyes that are a few dozen miles across, rapidly intensifying storms can develop an extremely small, clear, and circular eye, sometimes referred to as a pinhole eye. Storms with pinhole eyes are prone to large fluctuations in intensity, and provide difficulties and frustrations for forecasters.

Small/minuscule eyes – those less than ten nautical miles (19 km, 12 mi) across – often trigger eyewall replacement cycles, where a new eyewall begins to form outside the original eyewall. This can take place anywhere from fifteen to hundreds of kilometers (ten to a few hundred miles) outside the inner eye. The storm then develops two concentric eyewalls, or an "eye within an eye". In most cases, the outer eyewall begins to contract soon after its formation, which chokes off the inner eye and leaves a much larger but more stable eye. While the replacement cycle tends to weaken storms as it occurs, the new eyewall can contract fairly quickly after the old eyewall dissipates, allowing the storm to re-strengthen. This may be followed by another cycle of eyewall replacement.

Eyes can range in size from 370 km (230 mi) (Typhoon Carmen) to a mere 3.7 km (2.3 mi) (Hurricane Wilma) across. While it is uncommon for storms with large eyes to become very intense, it does occur, especially in annular hurricanes. Hurricane Isabel was the eleventh most powerful North Atlantic hurricane in recorded history, and sustained a wide – 65–80 km (40–50 mi) – eye for a period of several days.

== Formation and detection ==
Tropical cyclones form when the energy released by condensation of moisture in rising air causes a positive feedback loop over warm ocean waters.

Typically, eyes are easy to spot using weather radar. This radar image of Hurricane Ian clearly shows the eye near Fort Myers, Florida.

Tropical cyclones typically form from large, disorganized areas of disturbed weather in tropical regions. As more thunderstorms form and gather, the storm develops rainbands which start rotating around a common center. As the storm gains strength, a ring of stronger convection forms at a certain distance from the rotational center of the developing storm. Since stronger thunderstorms and heavier rain mark areas of stronger updrafts, the barometric pressure at the surface begins to drop, and air begins to build up in the upper levels of the cyclone. This results in the formation of an upper level anticyclone, or an area of high atmospheric pressure above the central dense overcast. Consequently, most of this built up air flows outward anticyclonically above the tropical cyclone. Outside the forming eye, the anticyclone at the upper levels of the atmosphere enhances the flow towards the center of the cyclone, pushing air towards the eyewall and causing a positive feedback loop.

However, a small portion of the built-up air, instead of flowing outward, flows inward towards the center of the storm. This causes air pressure to build even further, to the point where the weight of the air counteracts the strength of the updrafts in the center of the storm. Air begins to descend in the center of the storm, creating a mostly rain-free area – a newly formed eye.

Many aspects of this process remain a mystery. Scientists do not know why a ring of convection forms around the center of circulation instead of on top of it, or why the upper-level anticyclone ejects only a portion of the excess air above the storm. Many theories exist as to the exact process by which the eye forms: all that is known for sure is that the eye is necessary for tropical cyclones to achieve high wind speeds.

For storms with a clear eye, detection of the eye is as simple as looking at pictures from a weather satellite. However, for storms with a filled eye, or an eye completely covered by the central dense overcast, other detection methods must be used. Observations from ships and hurricane hunters can pinpoint an eye visually, by looking for a drop in wind speed or lack of rainfall in the storm's center. In the United States, South Korea, and a few other countries, a network of NEXRAD Doppler weather radar stations can detect eyes near the coast. Weather satellites also carry equipment for measuring atmospheric water vapor and cloud temperatures, which can be used to spot a forming eye. In addition, scientists have recently discovered that the amount of ozone in the eye is much higher than the amount in the eyewall, due to air sinking from the ozone-rich stratosphere. Instruments sensitive to ozone perform measurements, which are used to observe rising and sinking columns of air, and provide indication of the formation of an eye, even before satellite imagery can determine its formation.

Approximately 60% of Atlantic tropical cyclones form eyes. One satellite study found eyes detected on average for 30 hours per storm.

== Associated phenomena ==
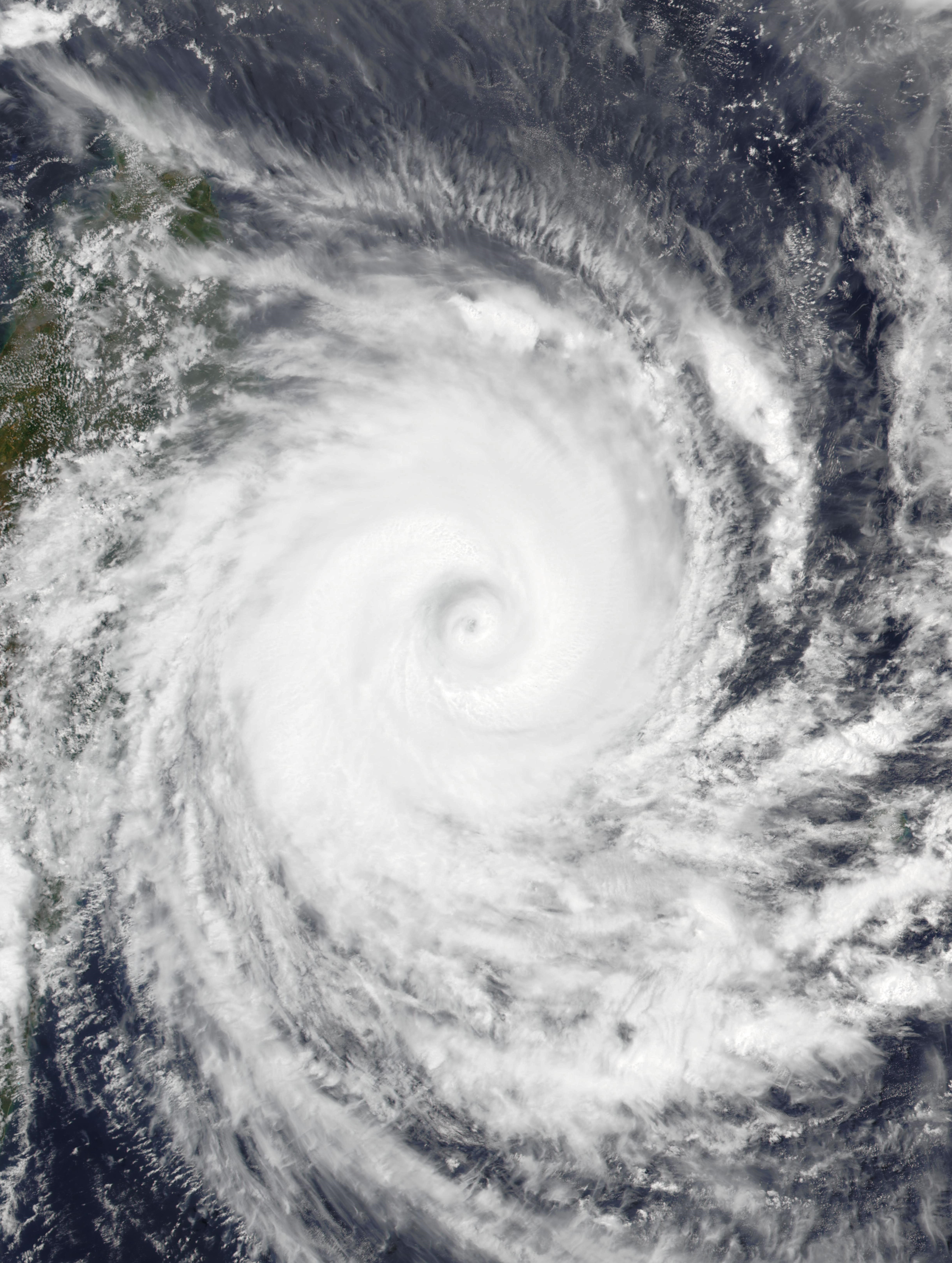
A satellite photo of Cyclone Emnati exhibiting an outer and inner eyewall while undergoing an eyewall replacement cycle

=== Eyewall replacement cycles ===
Eyewall replacement cycles, also called concentric eyewall cycles, naturally occur in intense tropical cyclones, generally with winds greater than 185 km/h (115 mph), or major hurricanes (Category 3 or higher on the Saffir–Simpson hurricane scale). When tropical cyclones reach this intensity, and the eyewall contracts or is already sufficiently small (see above), some of the outer rainbands may strengthen and organize into a ring of thunderstorms – an outer eyewall – that slowly moves inward and robs the inner eyewall of its needed moisture and angular momentum. Since the strongest winds are located in a cyclone's eyewall, the tropical cyclone usually weakens during this phase, as the inner wall is "choked" by the outer wall. Eventually the outer eyewall replaces the inner one completely, and the storm can re-intensify.

The discovery of this process was partially responsible for the end of the U.S. government's hurricane modification experiment Project Stormfury. This project set out to seed clouds outside the eyewall, causing a new eyewall to form and weakening the storm. When it was discovered that this was a natural process due to hurricane dynamics, the project was quickly abandoned.

Research shows that 53 percent of intense hurricanes undergo at least one of these cycles during its existence. Hurricane Allen in 1980 went through repeated eyewall replacement cycles, fluctuating between Category 5 and Category 4 status on the Saffir–Simpson scale several times, while Hurricane Juliette (2001) is a documented case of triple eyewalls.

=== Moats ===
A moat in a tropical cyclone is a clear ring outside the eyewall, or between concentric eyewalls, characterized by subsidence (slowly sinking air) and little or no precipitation. The air flow in the moat is dominated by the cumulative effects of stretching and shearing. The moat between eyewalls is an area in the storm where the rotational speed of the air changes greatly in proportion to the distance from the storm's center; these areas are also known as rapid filamentation zones. Such areas can potentially be found near any vortex of sufficient strength, but are most pronounced in strong tropical cyclones.

=== Eyewall mesovortices ===
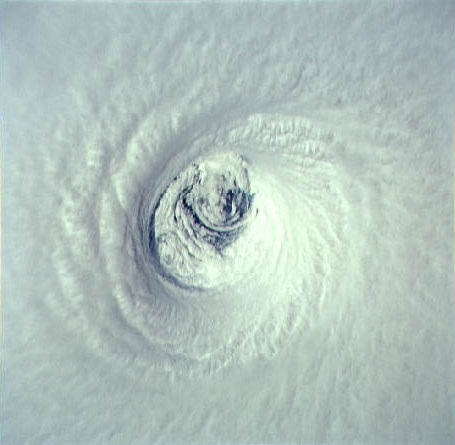
Mesovortices visible in the eye of Hurricane Emilia in 1994

Eyewall mesovortices are small scale rotational features found in the eyewalls of intense tropical cyclones. They are similar, in principle, to small "suction vortices" often observed in multiple-vortex tornadoes. In these vortices, wind speeds may be greater than anywhere else in the eyewall. Eyewall mesovortices are most common during periods of intensification in tropical cyclones.

Eyewall mesovortices often exhibit unusual behavior in tropical cyclones. They usually revolve around the low pressure center, but sometimes they remain stationary. Eyewall mesovortices have even been documented to cross the eye of a storm. These phenomena have been documented observationally, experimentally, and theoretically.

Eyewall mesovortices are a significant factor in the formation of tornadoes after tropical cyclone landfall. Mesovortices can spawn rotation in individual convective cells or updrafts (a mesocyclone), which leads to tornadic activity. At landfall, friction is generated between the circulation of the tropical cyclone and land. This can allow the mesovortices to descend to the surface, causing tornadoes. These tornadic circulations in the boundary layer may be prevalent in the inner eyewalls of intense tropical cyclones but with short duration and small size they are not frequently observed.

=== Stadium effect ===
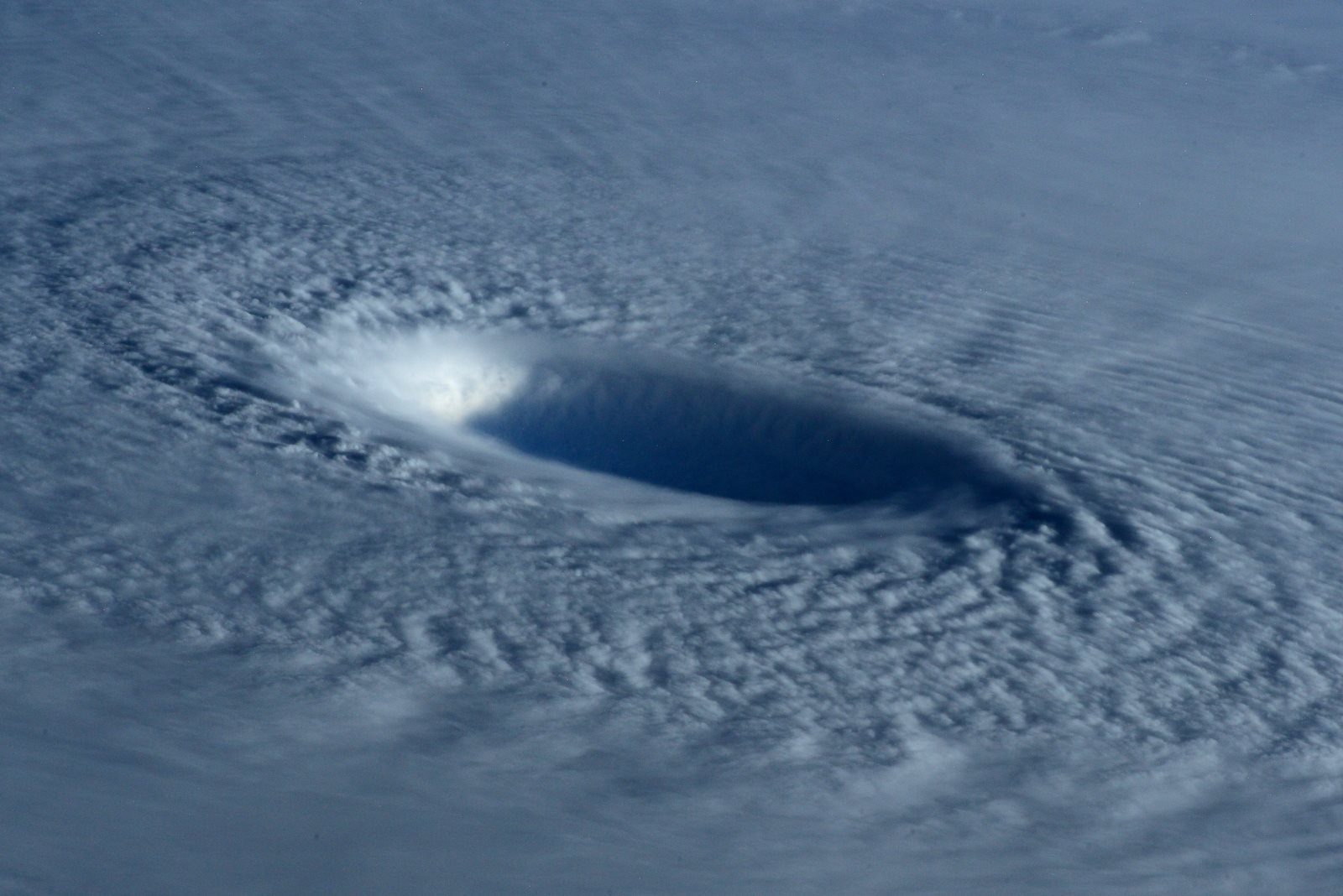
View of Typhoon Maysak's eye from the International Space Station displaying a pronounced stadium effect

The stadium effect is a phenomenon observed in strong tropical cyclones. It is a fairly common event, where the clouds of the eyewall curve outward from the surface with height. This gives the eye an appearance resembling a sports stadium from the air. An eye is always larger at the top of the storm, and smallest at the bottom of the storm because the rising air in the eyewall follows isolines of equal angular momentum, which also slope outward with height.

=== Eye-like features ===
An eye-like structure is often found in intensifying tropical cyclones. Similar to the eye seen in hurricanes or typhoons, it is a circular area at the circulation center of the storm in which convection is absent. These eye-like features are most normally found in intensifying tropical storms and hurricanes of Category 1 strength on the Saffir-Simpson scale. For example, an eye-like feature was found in Hurricane Beta when the storm had maximum wind speeds of only 80 km/h (50 mph), well below hurricane force. The features are typically not visible on visible wavelengths or infrared wavelengths from space, although they are easily seen on microwave satellite imagery. Their development at the middle levels of the atmosphere is similar to the formation of a complete eye, but the features might be horizontally displaced due to vertical wind shear.

== Hazards ==
NASA's DC-8 research aircraft flying through the eyewall and into the eye

Though the eye is by far the calmest and quietest part of the storm on land with no wind at the center and typically clear skies, it is possibly the most hazardous area on the ocean. In the eyewall, wind-driven waves all travel in the same direction. In the center of the eye, however, the waves converge from all directions, creating erratic crests that can build on each other to become rogue waves. The maximum height of hurricane waves is unknown, but measurements during Hurricane Ivan when it was a Category 4 hurricane estimated that waves near the eyewall exceeded 40 m (130 ft) from peak to trough.

A common mistake, especially in areas where hurricanes are uncommon, is for residents to exit their homes to inspect the damage while the calm eye passes over, only to be caught off guard by the violent winds in the opposite eyewall.

== Other cyclones ==
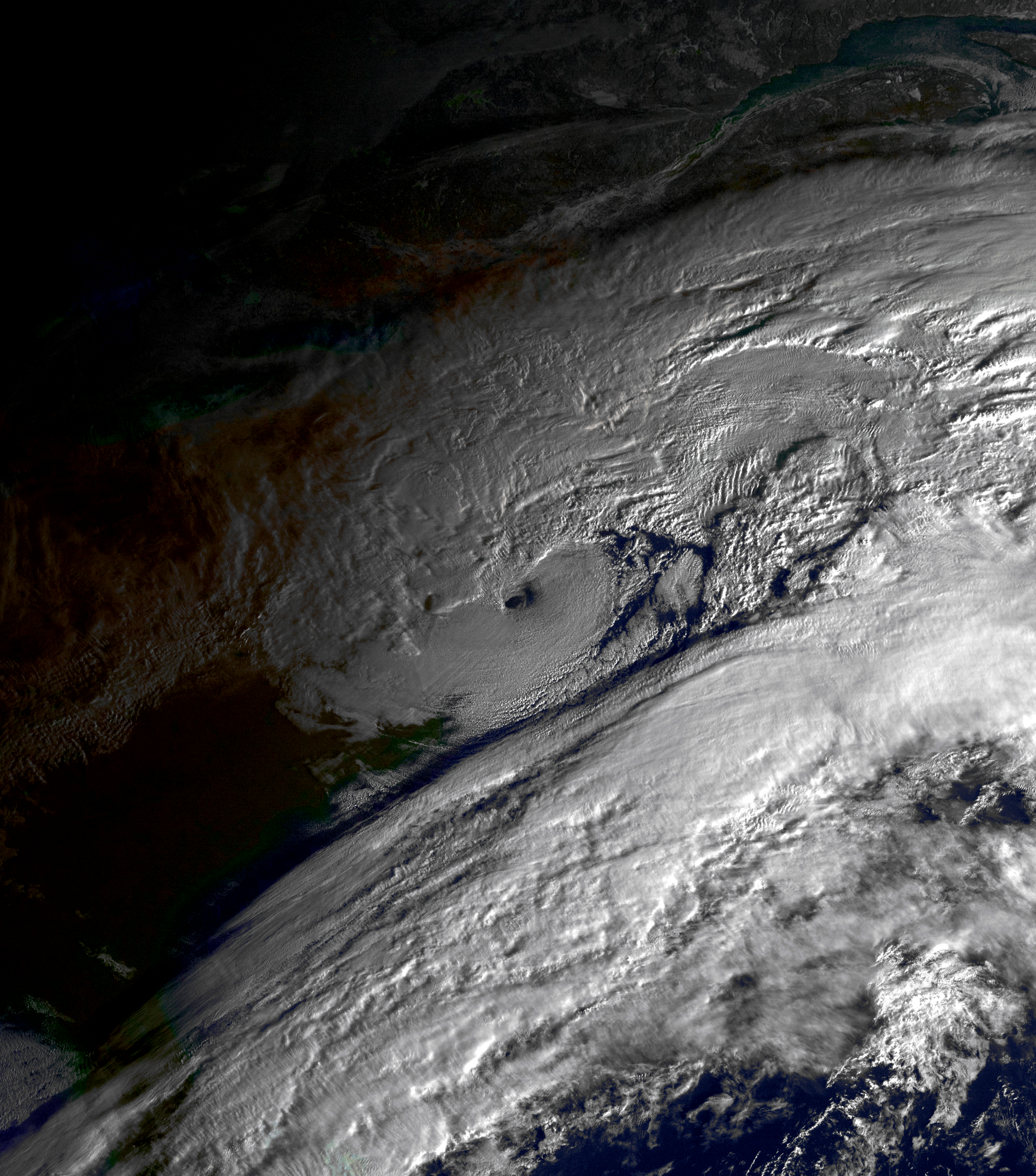
The North American blizzard of 2006, an extratropical storm, showed an eye-like structure at its peak intensity.

Though only tropical cyclones have structures officially termed "eyes", there are other weather systems that can exhibit eye-like features.

=== Polar lows ===
Polar lows are mesoscale weather systems, typically smaller than 1,000 km (600 mi) across, found near the poles. Like tropical cyclones, they form over relatively warm water and can feature deep convection and winds of gale force or greater. Unlike storms of tropical nature, however, they thrive in much colder temperatures and at much higher latitudes. They are also smaller and last for shorter durations, with few lasting longer than a day or so. Despite these differences, they can be very similar in structure to tropical cyclones, featuring a clear eye surrounded by an eyewall and bands of rain and snow.

=== Extratropical cyclones ===
Extratropical cyclones are areas of low pressure which exist at the boundary of different air masses. Almost all storms found at mid-latitudes are extratropical in nature, including classic North American nor'easters and European windstorms. The most severe of these can have a clear "eye" at the site of lowest barometric pressure, though it is usually surrounded by lower, non-convective clouds and is found near the back end of the storm.

=== Subtropical cyclones ===
Subtropical cyclones are low-pressure systems with some extratropical characteristics and some tropical characteristics. As such, they may have an eye while not being truly tropical in nature. Subtropical cyclones can be very hazardous, generating high winds and seas, and often evolve into fully tropical cyclones. For this reason, the National Hurricane Center began including subtropical storms in its naming scheme in 2002.

=== Tornadoes ===
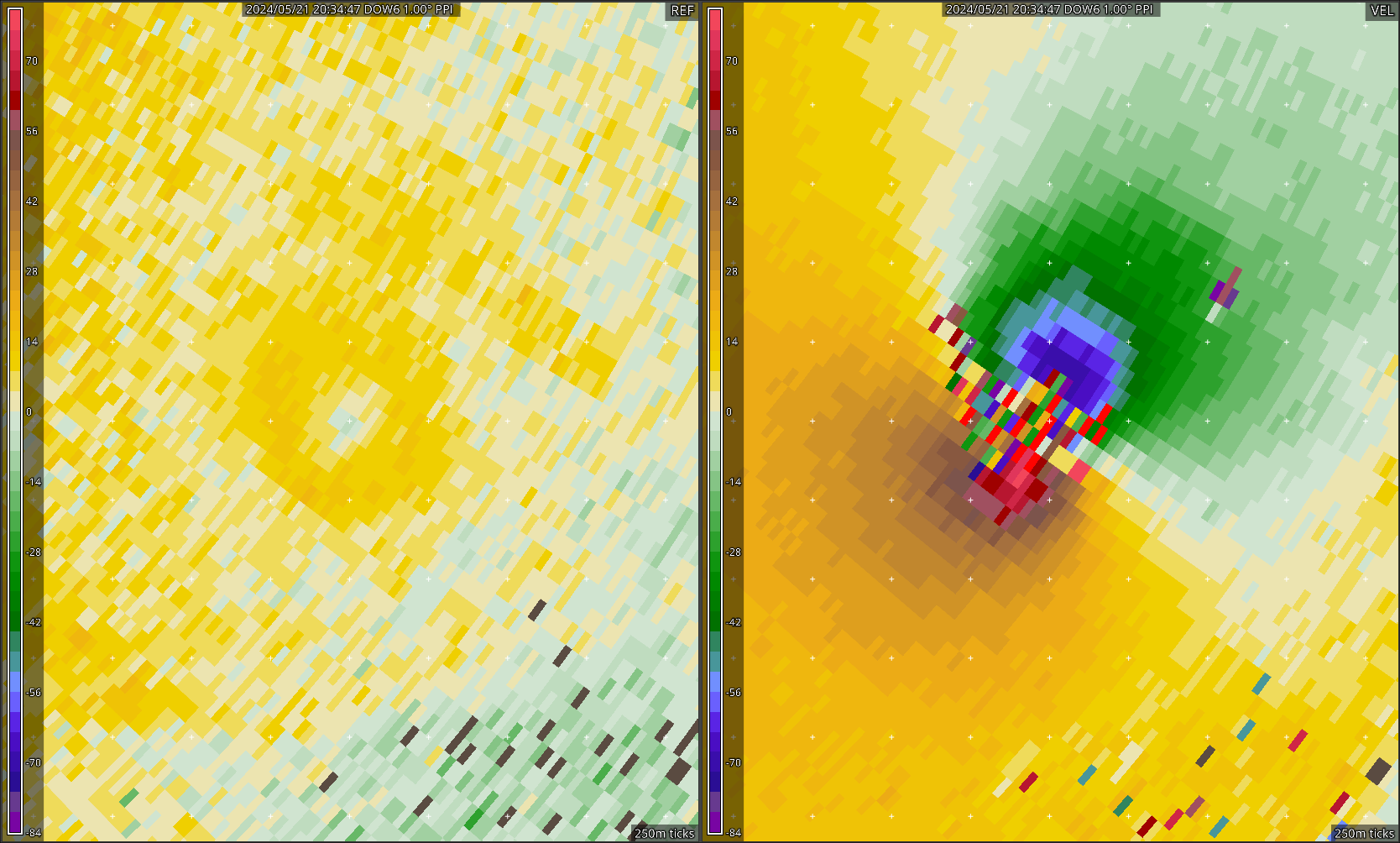
The EF4 Greenfield tornado as observed by Doppler on Wheels, with a clearing on reflectivity near the mesocyclone.

Tornadoes are destructive, small-scale storms, which produce the fastest winds on earth. There are two main types: single-vortex tornadoes, which consist of a single spinning column of air, and multiple-vortex tornadoes, which consist of small "suction vortices," resembling mini-tornadoes themselves, all rotating around a common center. Both types of vortex are theorized to contain calm eyes. These theories are supported by doppler velocity observations by weather radar and eyewitness accounts. Certain single-vortex tornadoes have also been shown to be relatively clear near the center vortex, visible by weak dBZ (reflectivity) returns seen on mobile radar, as well as containing slower wind speeds.

== Extraterrestrial vortices ==
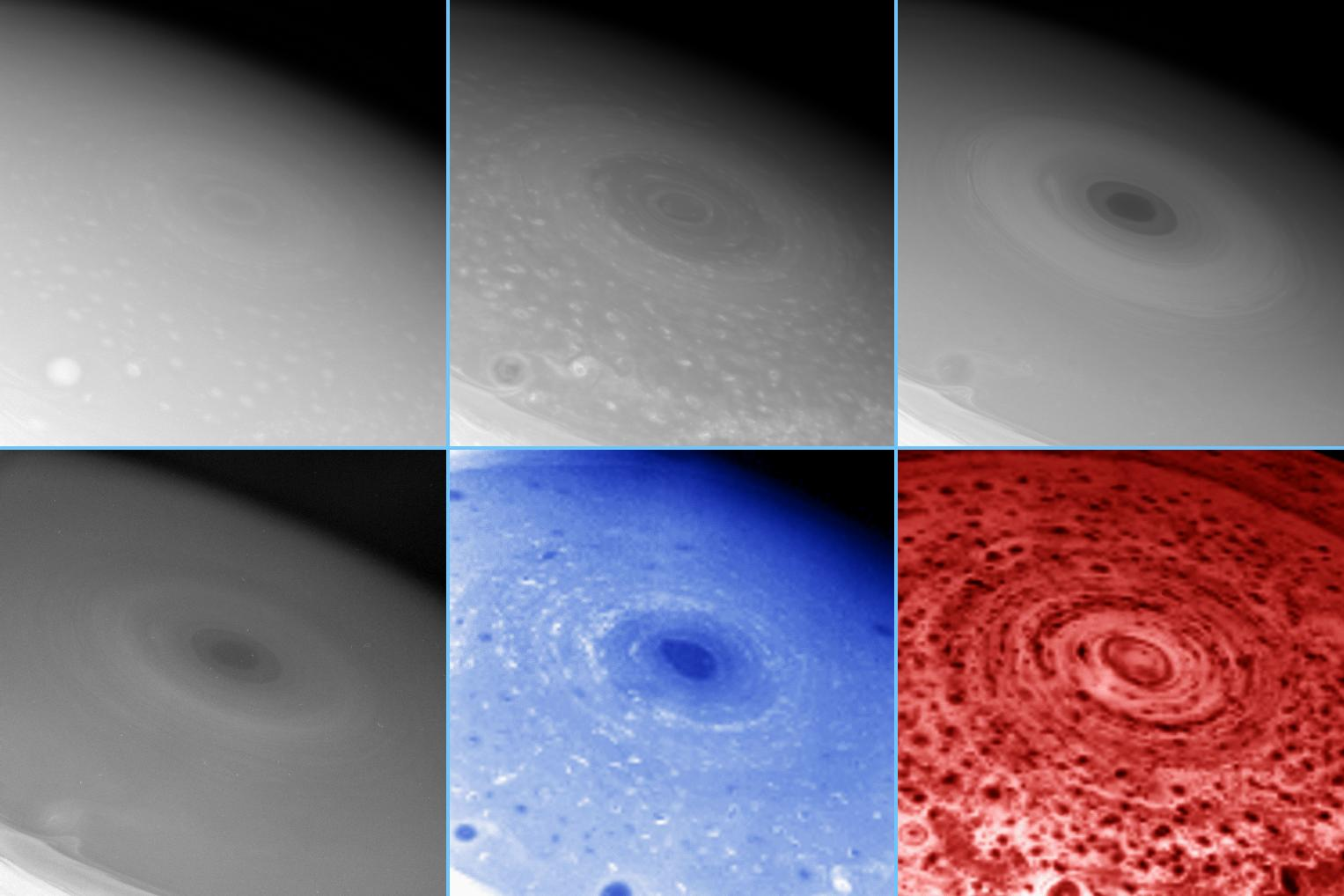
A hurricane-like storm on the south pole of Saturn displaying an eyewall tens of kilometers high

NASA reported in November 2006 that the Cassini spacecraft observed a "hurricane-like" storm locked to the south pole of Saturn with a clearly defined eyewall. The observation was particularly notable as eyewall clouds had not previously been seen on any planet other than Earth (including a failure to observe an eyewall in the Great Red Spot of Jupiter by the Galileo spacecraft). In 2007, very large vortices on both poles of Venus were observed by the Venus Express mission of the European Space Agency to have a dipole eye structure.

== See also ==
- Outline of tropical cyclones
- Radius of maximum wind
- RAINEX
- Storm surge
- Eyewall replacement cycle
