= Beard (disambiguation) =

A beard is the hair that dangles from the lower jaw of mammals and on a man's lower face.

Beard or bearded may also refer to:

== Places ==
=== United States ===
- Beard, Indiana
- Beard, West Virginia
- Beard Cabin, Shawnee, Oklahoma
- Beards Brook, New Hampshire

=== Elsewhere ===
- Beard, Australian Capital Territory, Australia
- Béard, Nièvre, France
- Beard Building, Toronto, Canada
- Beard Peak, Antarctica

== People ==
- Beard (surname)
- "The Beard", nickname of James Harden (born 1989), American basketball player

== Arts and entertainment ==
- The Beard, a 1965 play by Michael McClure
- "The Beard", a 1994 Boy Meets Girl season 2 episode
- "The Beard", a 1995 Seinfeld episode
- The Beards (Australian band), a comedy folk rock group (2005–2016)

== Other uses ==
- Beard (companion), one used to conceal sexual orientation or infidelity
- Beard (grape) (or Bia Blanc)
- Beard, an edible mussel's byssus
- Beard, a turkey's breast feathers

== See also ==
- Beard line, the line along the bottom of descenders in typography
- Blackbeard (disambiguation)
- Bluebeard (disambiguation)
- Red Beard (disambiguation)
