= Daniel O'Shea =

American pair skater (born 1991)

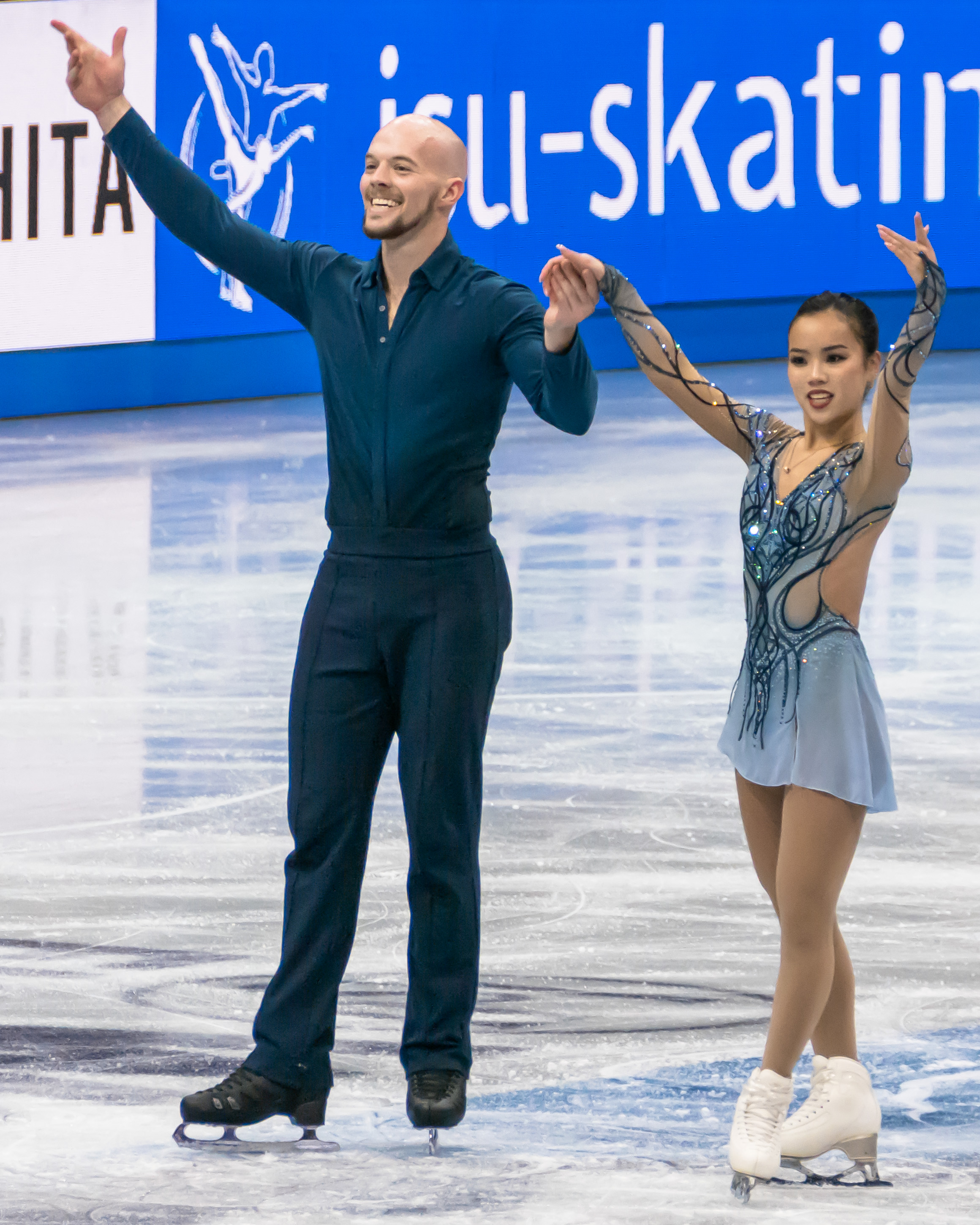
- Ellie Kam and Daniel O'Shea at the 2025 World Championships

Personal information
- Born: February 13, 1991 (age 35) Pontiac, Michigan, U.S.
- Home town: Colorado Springs, Colorado, U.S.
- Height: 6 ft 0 in (1.83 m)

Figure skating career
- Country: United States
- Discipline: Pair skating (since 2012); Men's singles (2006–09)
- Partner: Ellie Kam (since 2022); Chelsea Liu (2021–22); Tarah Kayne (2012–21)
- Coach: Drew Meekins; Sandy Straub
- Skating club: Skating Club of New York
- Began skating: 1995

Medal record
Event	Gold medal – first place	Silver medal – second place	Bronze medal – third place
Olympic Games	1	0	0
Four Continents Championships	1	1	1
U.S. Championships	2	2	4
Medal list
Olympic Games
Gold medal – first place	2026 Milano Cortina	Team
Four Continents Championships
Gold medal – first place	2018 Taipei	Pairs
Silver medal – second place	2014 Taipei	Pairs
Bronze medal – third place	2024 Shanghai	Pairs
U.S. Championships
Gold medal – first place	2016 Saint Paul	Pairs
Gold medal – first place	2024 Columbus	Pairs
Silver medal – second place	2018 San Jose	Pairs
Silver medal – second place	2026 St. Louis	Pairs
Bronze medal – third place	2015 Greensboro	Pairs
Bronze medal – third place	2020 Greensboro	Pairs
Bronze medal – third place	2023 San Jose	Pairs
Bronze medal – third place	2025 Wichita	Pairs

Daniel O'Shea (born February 13, 1991) is an American pair skater. He currently competes with Ellie Kam. With Kam, he is a 2026 Olympic Games team event gold medalist, the 2024 Four Continents bronze medalist, four-time Grand Prix medalist, four-time Challenger Series medalist, and 2024 U.S. national champion.

With his former partner, Tarah Kayne, he is the 2018 Four Continents champion, 2014 Four Continents silver medalist, and 2016 U.S. national champion.

== Personal life ==
O'Shea was born on February 13, 1991, in Pontiac, Michigan to parents Don and Judi O'Shea. He also has one older brother, Keane. At the age of sixteen, O'Shea began battling an eating disorder that lasted for a period until he was eventually able to seek help from a nutritionist.

Growing up, in addition to figure skating, O'Shea played football, soccer and basketball. In addition, he also ran track and learned karate. After graduating from St. Viator High School, O'Shea went on to earn a business degree from the University of Colorado Colorado Springs.

On August 6th, 2026, O’Shea, along with several of his team USA athletes, attended a reception thrown by US President Donald Trump in celebration of their Olympic accomplishments.

== Skating career ==
=== Early career ===
O'Shea began learning to skate in 1995. He competed with Christine Mozer in the 2011–2012 season, Caroline Knoop in 2010–2011, and Jessica Calalang in 2009–2010. He also competed in singles until 2011.

O'Shea teamed up with Tarah Kayne in April 2012.

=== 2012–13 season ===
Kayne/O'Shea finished seventh in their first trip to the U.S. Championships in January 2013. Making their international debut, they won the silver medal at the 2013 International Challenge Cup.

=== 2013–14 season: First Four Continents medal ===
Kayne/O'Shea won bronze medals at the U.S. Classic and Ice Challenge. After placing sixth at the 2014 U.S. Championships, they were assigned to the 2014 Four Continents, where they won the silver medal.

=== 2014–15 season ===
On July 28, 2014, Kayne underwent surgery due to a labral tear in her right hip. As a result, the pair withdrew from their 2014–15 Grand Prix assignments, the 2014 Cup of China and 2014 Rostelecom Cup. Kayne/O'Shea returned to competition at the 2014 Golden Spin of Zagreb, taking bronze at the ISU Challenger Series (CS) event. The pair stepped onto their first national podium at the 2015 U.S. Championships, where they were awarded the bronze medal.

=== 2015–16 season ===
Kayne/O'Shea began their season with gold at a CS event, the 2015 U.S. International Classic. Kayne injured her right knee at the event.

Making their Grand Prix debut, the pair placed sixth at the 2015 Skate America and fourth at the 2015 Rostelecom Cup. Another Challenger medal followed, bronze at the 2015 Golden Spin of Zagreb in December. In January, Kayne/O'Shea placed first in both segments at the 2016 U.S. Championships and won the gold medal by a margin of 14.85 points over defending champions Alexa Scimeca / Chris Knierim.

=== 2016–17 season ===
After placing fifth at the 2016 CS Finlandia Trophy, Kayne/O'Shea competed at two Grand Prix events, finishing sixth at the 2016 Skate America and fourth at the 2016 NHK Trophy. The pair withdrew from the 2017 U.S. Championships due to a concussion, Kayne having hit her head while attempting a throw triple flip during the short program on January 19.

During the season, Kayne experienced increasing pain due to right knee tendinitis, the result of her 2015 injury. She received a new cadaver tendon in an operation at the Vail Valley Medical Center on February 14, 2017, and then refrained from walking for seven weeks. She resumed training in July 2017.

=== 2017–18 season: Four Continents gold ===
Kayne/O'Shea did not compete in the early part of the season, including the Grand Prix, instead beginning the season at the 2017 CS Golden Spin of Zagreb, where they won the bronze medal. They took silver at the 2018 U.S. Championships and were named first alternates for the 2018 Winter Olympics, where the United States had only one pairs spot, as well as part of America's teams for the Four Continents and World Championships.

At the 2018 Four Continents Championships, they were third after the short program and then had a personal best score in the free skate to win the gold medal, the first American team to do so in over a decade. Kayne said she felt "really great about our performance," They anticipated competing at the World Championships. However, following the event, Kayne was diagnosed with a stress fracture in her right knee. As a result, they withdrew from the World Championships, and were replaced by bronze medalists Deanna Stellato / Nathan Bartholomay.

They were coached by Jim Peterson, in Ellenton, Florida, until the end of the season.

=== 2018–19 season: First Grand Prix medal ===
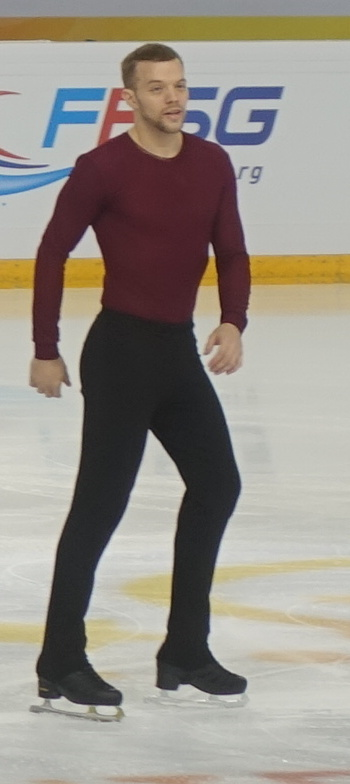
O'Shea at the 2018 Internationaux de France

On September 7, 2018, Kayne/O'Shea announced a coaching change, deciding to join Dalilah Sappenfield in Colorado Springs, Colorado. They began the season with a seventh-place finish at the 2018 CS Nebelhorn Trophy. Assigned to two Grand Prix events, they first competed at the 2018 NHK Trophy, finishing fifth. At the 2018 Internationaux de France, Kayne/O'Shea were fourth after the short program but placed second in the free skate, finishing less than two points ahead of bronze medalists Aleksandra Boikova / Dmitrii Kozlovskii. This was their first Grand Prix medal. Kayne remarked that after a "less than desirable" performance in Japan, "to have come to France and make this much improvement in just two short weeks made us both very happy."

At the 2019 U.S. Championships, Kayne/O'Shea placed first in the short program, just ahead of Ashley Cain / Timothy LeDuc. In the free skate, they made some small opening mistakes on their twist and side-by-side jumps but then had a major error when they failed to execute their final lift, which caused them to drop to fourth place. O'Shea commented afterward, "I didn't do what I was supposed to do." They were nevertheless named to the American team for the Four Continents Championships over bronze medalists Stellato-Dudek/Bartholomay. They finished in sixth place there, with Kayne saying their performance was a personal disappointment.

=== 2019–20 season ===
Kayne/O'Shea began with a fourth-place finish at the 2019 CS U.S. Classic. On the Grand Prix, they were sixth to begin at the 2019 Cup of China. Kayne/O'Shea were sixth as well at the 2019 NHK Trophy.

Competing at the 2020 U.S. Championships, Kayne/O'Shea placed second in the short program, seven points behind the leaders, Knierim/Knierim. Third in the free skate, they won the bronze medal behind the Knierims and Calalang/Johnson. O'Shea called it "an improvement as the program has progressed over the first part of the season. We are taking steps in the right direction." They finished the season with a fifth-place finish at the 2020 Four Continents Championships.

=== 2020–21 season ===
In September, Kayne and O'Shea announced they were leaving coach Dalilah Sappenfield, at the time saying publicly that they were looking forward to exploring new training options and looking forward to staying strong as a team.

They were fourth at the ISP Points Challenge, a virtual domestic competition. They competed at the 2020 Skate America, primarily attended by American pairs teams due to travel restrictions relating to the COVID-19 pandemic. Their previous coaches Jim Peterson and Amanda Evora helped them to prepare for the competition. The permanent training environment of Kayne and O'Shea will be determined after the competition.

On December 10, it was announced that Kayne and O'Shea had split, with Kayne subsequently retiring.

==== Allegations against Dalilah Sappenfield ====
On October 8, 2021, reporter Christine Brennan of USA Today reported that Kayne and O'Shea had left Sappenfield and that Kayne had subsequently left the sport due to repeated harassment and abuse from Sappenfield while training. Kayne stated that Sappenfield's behaviour had resulted in her engaging in self-harm that she had been scared to seek treatment for due to the possibility of her coach learning of it. She said to Brennan that "these awful experiences forced me out of the sport I love. Dalilah said multiple times that she wanted to end my career, and she succeeded." O'Shea expressed his support for Kayne's account.

=== 2021–22 season ===
At the end of June, USFSA added O'Shea to the International Selection Pool, which is a list of teams eligible for international competition, with new partner, Chelsea Liu. Liu/O'Shea finished fifth in their international debut at the Cranberry Cup, and went on to make their Grand Prix debut together at the 2021 Skate America, where they came seventh. However, their partnership was derailed by an on-ice accident at the 2021 CS Warsaw Cup that left both concussed. They withdrew from the 2022 U.S. Championships, and ultimately their partnership ended.

=== 2022–23 season ===
Initially uncertain how to proceed following the end of his partnership with Liu, O'Shea spent some time offering coaching assistance to other pairs skaters, before eventually forming a new partnership with Ellie Kam. In the fall, they made their international debut at the 2022 Ice Challenge and won the gold medal in the pairs competition. They then made their Challenger debut at the 2022 CS Golden Spin of Zagreb, winning the silver medal.

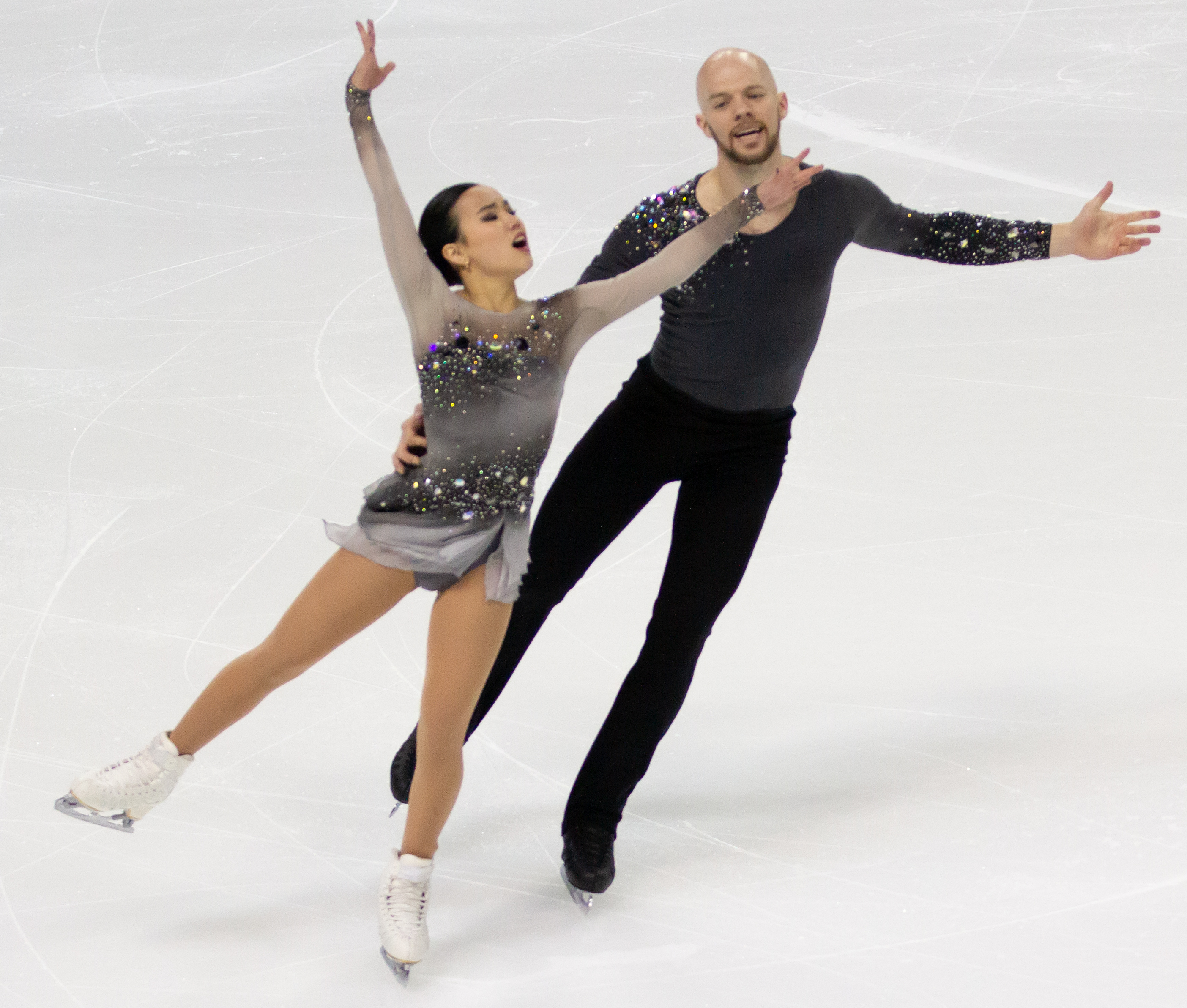
Kam/O'Shea at the 2023 Four Continents Championships

Kam/O'Shea competed next at the 2023 U.S. Championships, where they placed third in the short program. They opened their free skate with Kam falling on their triple twist, but still managed to place third in that segment as well, winning the bronze medal. Kam called the experience "quite the whirlwind."

Having reached the national podium, Kam/O'Shea were assigned to make their ISU championship debut together at the 2023 Four Continents Championships, held in their home training location of Colorado Springs. O'Shea considered this "pretty special." They placed seventh in the short program, but a fifth-place free skate moved them up to sixth overall. Kam/O'Shea finished the season at the 2023 World Championships in Saitama, where they finished twelfth.

=== 2023–24 season: Four Continents bronze ===
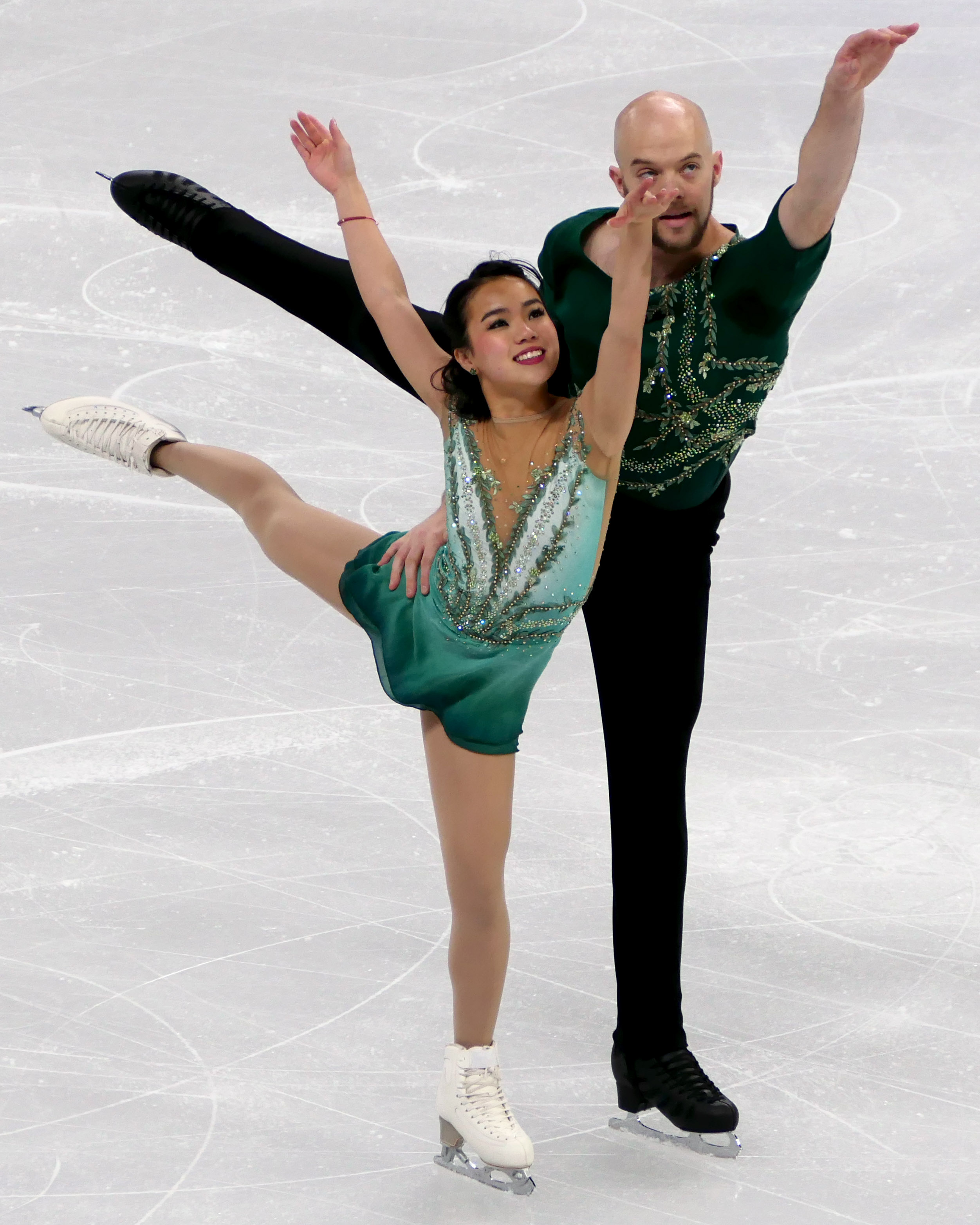
Kam and O'Shea performing during their short program at the 2024 World Championships

Kam/O'Shea began the season with a victory at the 2023 CS Finlandia Trophy. They were invited to make their Grand Prix debut at the 2023 Grand Prix de France, and finished fifth in the short program, but had to withdraw after Kam suffered an injury in training. Despite this, Kam/O'Shea were able to attend their second Grand Prix, the 2023 Grand Prix of Espoo, coming sixth.

At the 2024 U.S. Championships, Kam/O'Shea finished second in the short program with a score of 64.57, with Kam having struggled on the throw landing and O'Shea two-footing his jump. Segment leaders Chan/Howe withdrew in advance of the free skate, leaving Kam/O'Shea the de facto first-place finishers heading into that segment. They were second in the free skate behind Efimova/Mitrofanov, but won their first national title by 0.85 points. O'Shea enthused that "being first is amazing," while noting there was room to improve on their performance, in particular continued difficulties with throw landings.

Kam/O'Shea had already been named to the American team for the 2024 Four Continents Championships in advance of the national championships, due to the events being separated by less than a week. Traveling to Shanghai for the competition, they finished fourth in the short program despite Kam's throw fall, before a second-place free skate lifted them to the bronze medal, their first international championship podium as a team. Kam noted that the turnaround between the events was such that she did not feel their national gold had "[sunk] in yet."

In the short program at the 2024 World Championships in Montreal, Quebec, Canada, Kam fell on their throw triple loop, but the team was otherwise clean and they came tenth in the segment. O'Shea said that it was "nice to see that with a fall – a fairly large mistake – we still get a season-best. That means the other things we’ve been working on are improving and the judges are starting to see that piece as well." Difficulties with jumps and throws continued in the free skate, and Kam/O'Shea dropped to eleventh overall.

=== 2024–25 season: Two Grand Prix medals ===
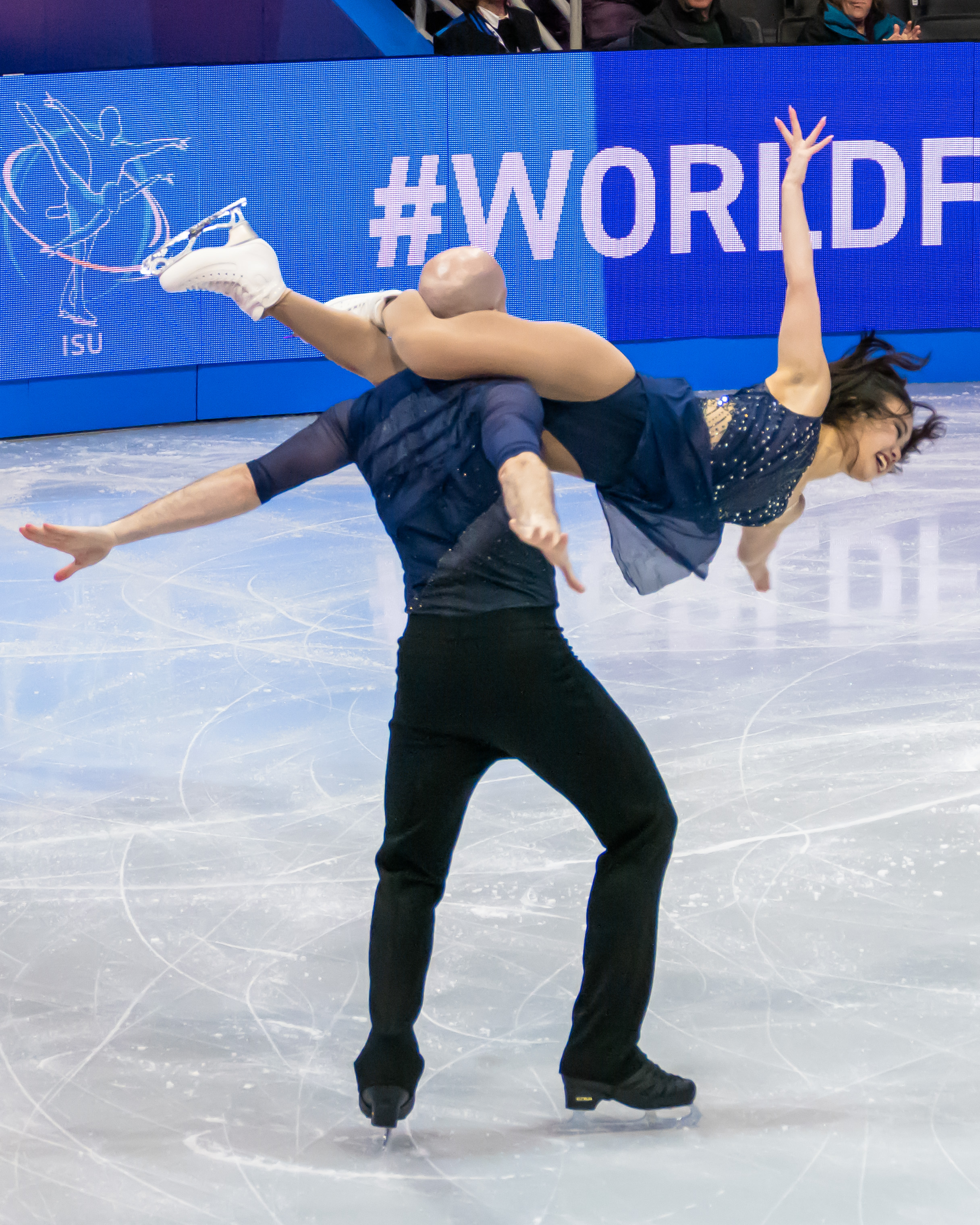
Kam and O'Shea performing a pair lift during their short program at the 2025 World Championships

Kam/O'Shea began their season by competing on the 2024–25 ISU Challenger Series. They won gold at the 2024 John Nicks Pairs Competition and bronze at the 2024 Nebelhorn Trophy.

Going on to compete on the 2024–25 Grand Prix series, the pair won the silver medal at the 2024 Skate America, scoring a personal best free skate and combined total score in the process. “We are really happy to be on the podium at Skate America,” said O’Shea. “This is our first Grand Prix medal. We worked very hard during the off-season, and this shows that the hard work paid off.” The team followed up this result with a bronze medal at the 2024 NHK Trophy. These Grand Prix series results allowed the pair to qualify for the 2024–25 Grand Prix Final, where they finished in fifth place.

Entering the 2025 U.S. Championships as defending champions, Kam/O'Shea won the short program with a clean skate. Their score of 77.19 points gave him an eight-point margin over Chan/Howe in second place. However, an error-riddled free skate that included a lift fall in addition to problems on jumps and throws saw them fifth in that segment, dropping to third overall. O'Shea vowed to use the lift failure as "motivation. I'm extremely pissed at myself. I know I'm far better than that, and I will do better next time."

Kam/O'Shea placed second in the short program at the 2025 Four Continents Championships in Seoul, South Korea, winning a silver small medal, despite Kam turning out of the landing of their throw triple loop. Their free skate again had a number of errors on jumps and throws, as a result of which they dropped to fourth overall, finishing 1.46 points behind bronze medalists Pereira/Michaud of Canada.

Two days prior to traveling for the 2025 World Championships in Boston, Massachusetts, United States, O'Shea broke his foot. In spite of this, O'Shea pushed himself to compete, determined to help earn three spots for U.S. pair skating at the 2026 Winter Olympics. Kam/O'Shea ultimately finished the event in seventh place after placing fifth in the short program and seventh in the free skate. Their placement, in addition to Efimova/Mitrofanov's sixth-place finish, earned three berths for U.S. pair skating at the 2026 Winter Olympics. In an interview following the event, O'Shea shared, "We are very happy with what we accomplished this week, together alongside Alisa and Misha. We secured the three spots for Worlds next year and the third potential Olympic spot. It means a lot to us." O'Shea subsequently had to receive surgery on his injured foot.

=== 2025–2026 season: Milano Cortina Olympics team gold and two Grand Prix medals ===
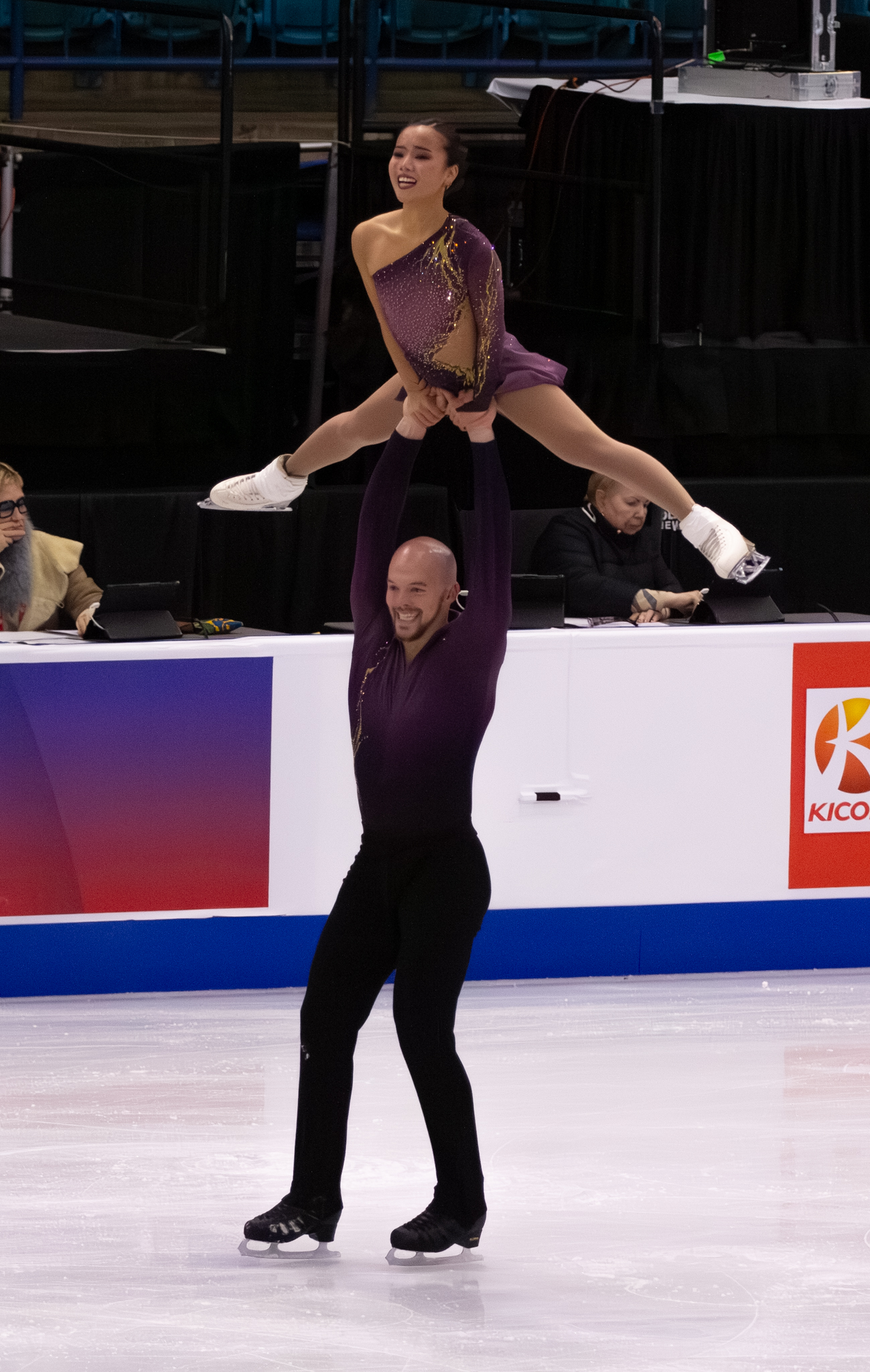
Kam and O'Shea performing a pair lift during their short program at the 2025 Skate Canada International

Kam/O'Shea opened their season at 2025 CS Trialeti Trophy where they placed fifth.

Three weeks later, the team competed at 2025 Skate Canada International where they won the bronze medal. “It was a tough off season for us," said O'Shea of the previous season. "Three months off the ice for myself and a month off for Ellie for random injuries and surgeries. We see ourselves be in a good path as we continue to grow with each competition."

Later the same month, Kam/O'Shea took another bronze at 2025 Finlandia Trophy. "It definitely helps just to have more experience at these competitions," said Kam. "I feel like last year I still felt I was so new to international competition and always feel so lucky to be here. But I think just being more comfortable at these competitions helps."

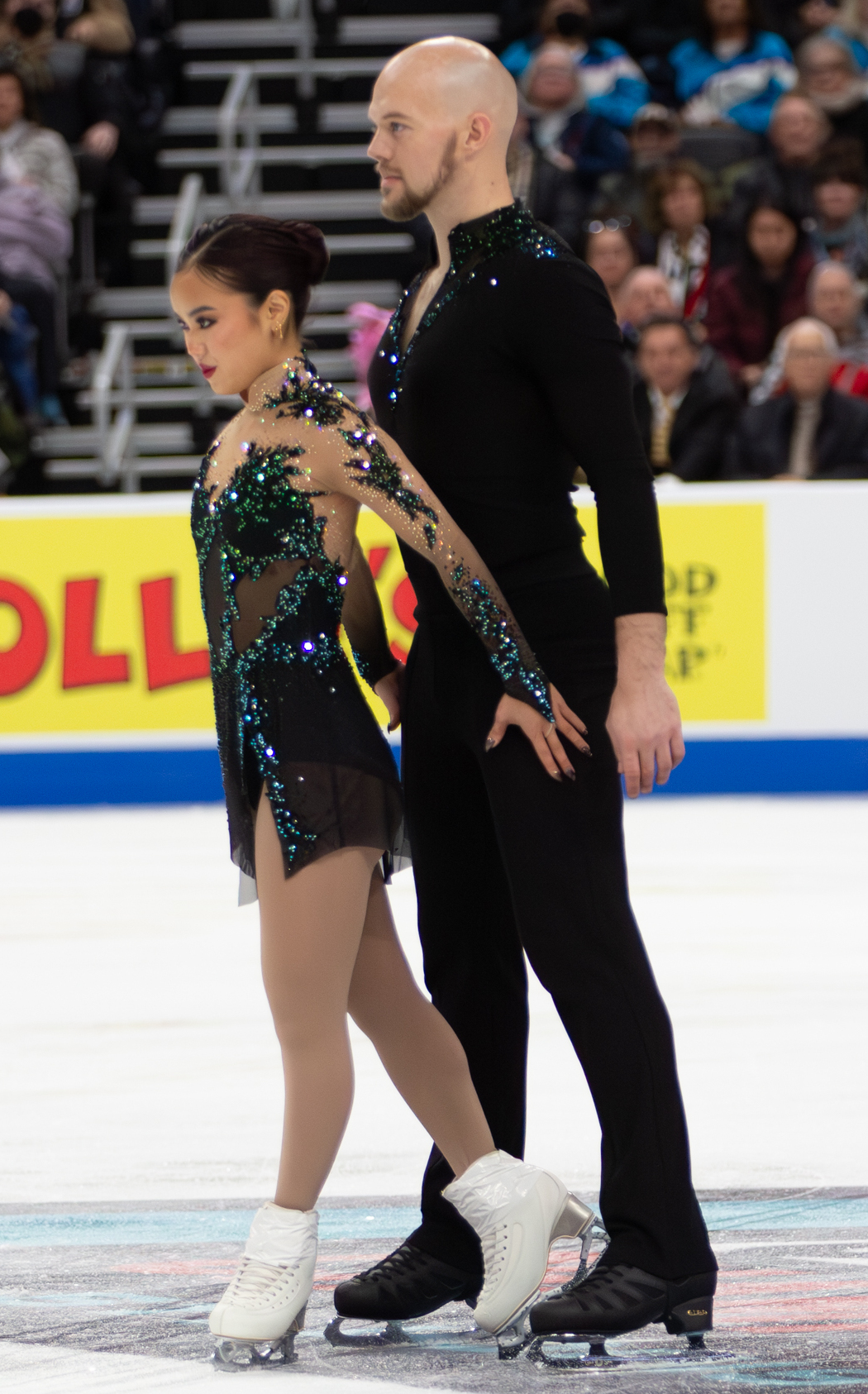
Kam and O'Shea during their free skate at the 2026 U.S. Championships

In January, Kam/O'Shea won the silver medal at the 2026 U.S. Championships behind Efimova/Mitrofanov. They were subsequently named to the 2026 Winter Olympic team. "It's been a long journey," O’Shea reflected on his Olympic aspirations. "A long time on Team USA and a long time working towards this. And it was always a goal but coming back and skating with Ellie for these past four seasons, it's been at the forefront of my mind for sure."

On 6 February, Kam/O'Shea placed fifth in the short program in the 2026 Winter Olympics Figure Skating Team Event after a fall on a throw triple loop. “The throws are something we’ve spent a lot of time working on since the start of our partnership” said Kam. “Some people say we struggle with them, but I don't really see it that way. It's more that it's something we’ve had to work on a bit more compared to other teams. We’re still a relatively new team and still fine-tuning certain elements.” Two days later, the pair delivered a clean performance in the free skate, placing fourth in that segment and accumulating enough points to help Team United States of America win the gold medal. "It felt like a performance of a lifetime," Kam said after their free skate. "It's certainly our personal best, and to put it out on a stage like this as a team, it feels amazing. We’re still improving, and there's still a lot of opportunity to improve even from what we did tonight, but I think we couldn't be more proud."

Following the Winter Olympics, Kam/O'Shea withdrew from the 2026 World Championships. Chan/Howe were called up to compete.

== Programs ==
=== Pair skating with Ellie Kam ===
Season	Short program	Free skating	Exhibition
2022–23	Nocturnal Animals; Exhibition; Wayward Sisters; Table for Two by Abel Korzeniowski choreo. by Drew Meekins	The Prayer performed by Charlotte Church & Josh Groban choreo. by Drew Meekins	
2023–24	Nocturnal Animals; Exhibition; Wayward Sisters; Table for Two by Abel Korzeniowski choreo. by Drew Meekins	East of Eden by Lee Holdridge choreo. by Drew Meekins	Uptown Funk by Mark Ronson ft. Bruno Mars
2024–25	Rain, in Your Black Eyes by Ezio Bosso choreo. by Drew Meekins	Concealed Passion by Audiomachine; Stand by Me by Ben E. King performed by Florence and the Machine choreo. by Marie-France Dubreuil	Uptown Funk by Mark Ronson ft. Bruno Mars; Cupid (Twin Version) by Fifty Fifty; On the Floor by Jennifer Lopez ft. Pitbull; Give Me Everything by Pitbull ft. Ne-Yo, Afrojack, & Nayer; Shake Señora by Pitbull ft. T-Pain & Sean Paul
2025–26	Hallelujah by Leonard Cohen performed by k.d. lang choreo. by Drew Meekins	Sweet Dreams (Are Made of This) by Eurythmics performed by Cinematic Pop, Rob Gardner, & Mckenna Breinholt; Eleanor Rigby by The Beatles performed by Cinematic Pop & Adam Payne; Everybody Wants to Rule the World by Tears for Fears performed by Cinematic Pop, Spencer Jones & Mckenna Breinholt choreo. by Marie-France Dubreuil	On the Floor by Jennifer Lopez ft. Pitbull; Give Me Everything by Pitbull ft. Ne-Yo, Afrojack, & Nayer; Shake Señora by Pitbull ft. T-Pain & Sean Paul

=== Pair skating with Chelsea Liu ===
Season	Short program	Free skating
2021–22	Lover by Taylor Swift choreo. by Adam Rippon	Becoming Human (from Score: A Film Music Documentary) by Ryan Taubert choreo. by Sinead Kerr, John Kerr

=== Pair skating with Tarah Kayne ===
Season	Short program	Free skating	Exhibition
2012–13	My Fair Lady by Frederick Loewe choreo. by Jim Peterson	The Nutcracker by Pyotr Ilyich Tchaikovsky choreo. by Jim Peterson	
2013–14	James Bond medley by John Barry choreo. by Jim Peterson	Don Quixote by Ludwig Minkus choreo. by Jim Peterson	
2014–15	Your Song by Ewan McGregor choreo. by Jim Peterson	Spartacus by Aram Khachaturian choreo. by Jim Peterson	Saturday Night's Alright for Fighting by Elton John
2015–16	Take Me to Church by Hozier choreo. by Jim Peterson; España cañí by Pascual Marquina	The Music of the Night by Andrew Lloyd Webber and Charles Hart performed by Barbra Streisand and Michael Crawford choreo. by Jim Peterson	Manhattan by Sara Bareilles
2016–17	Take Me to Church by Hozier choreo. by Jim Peterson; Will You Still Love Me Tomorrow; Back to Black by Amy Winehouse choreo. by Judy Blumberg	A Song of India by Nikolai Rimsky-Korsakov; Marche Slave by Pyotr Ilyich Tchaikovsky choreo. by Jim Peterson, Judy Blumberg	Johanna (from Sweeney Todd)
2017–18	All I Ask of You (from The Phantom of the Opera) by Andrew Lloyd Webber choreo. by Massimo Scali	Evermore by Josh Groban	
2018–19	That's It (I'm Crazy) by Sofi Tukker choreo. by Shae-Lynn Bourne, Shae Zukiwsky	Swan Lake by Pyotr Ilyich Tchaikovsky choreo. by Shae-Lynn Bourne, Shae Zukiwsky	That's It (I'm Crazy) by Sofi Tukker choreo. by Shae-Lynn Bourne, Shae Zukiwsky
2019–20	Sweet Dreams (Are Made of This) (from A Wrinkle in Time) by Eurythmics performed by Mark Hadley & Dresage choreo. by Charlie White	Swan Lake by Pyotr Ilyich Tchaikovsky choreo. by Shae-Lynn Bourne, Shae Zukiwsky	Les Misérables by Claude-Michel Schönberg, Alain Boublil & Herbert Kretzmer choreo. by Pasquale Camerlengo
2020–21	Clair de lune by Claude Debussy choreo. by Randi Strong	Carmen by Georges Bizet choreo. by Randi Strong	

== Competitive highlights ==
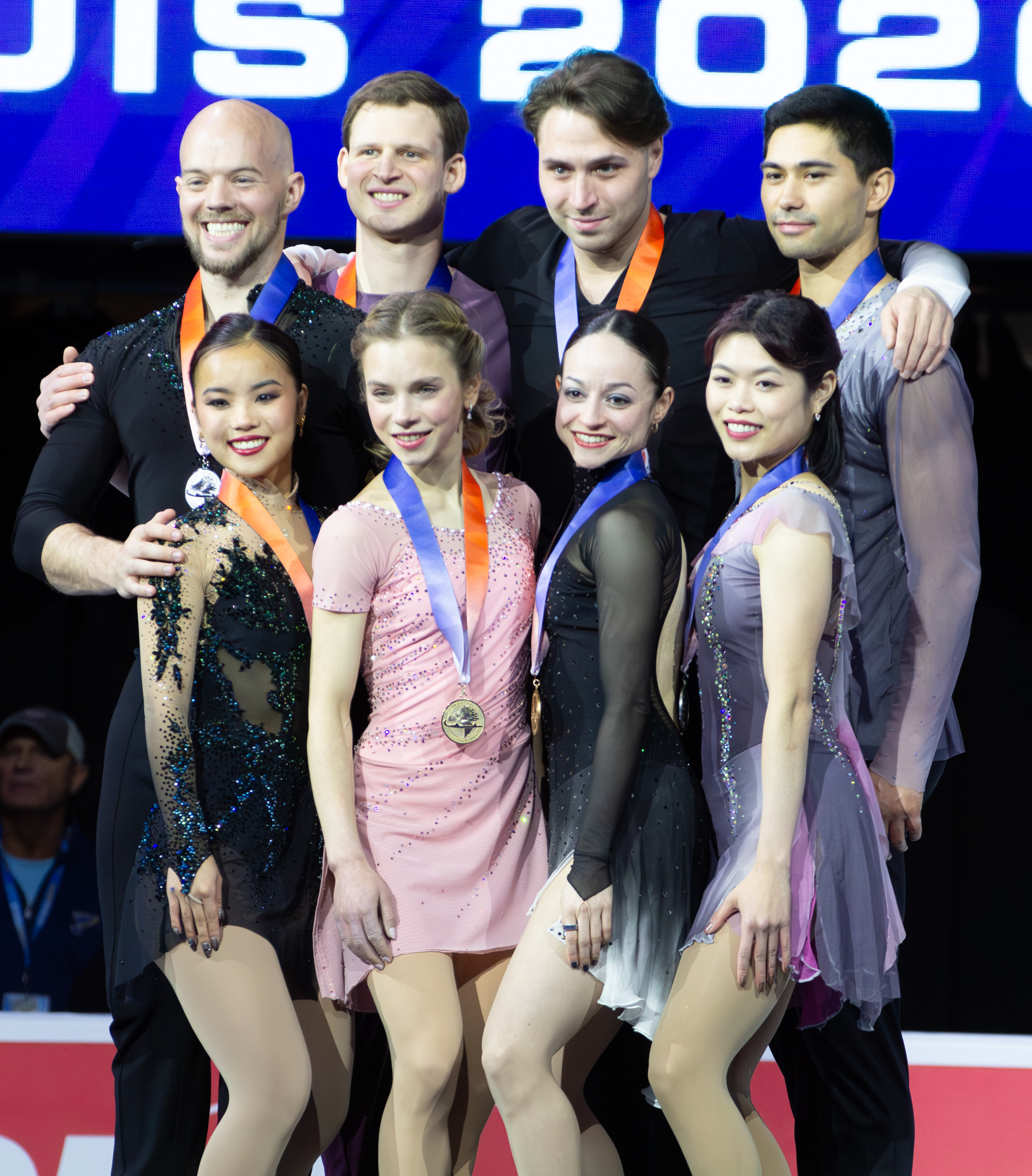
Kam and O'Shea (far left) during the medal ceremony at the 2026 U.S. Championships

- GP – Event of the ISU Grand Prix Series
- JGP – Event of the ISU Junior Grand Prix Series
- CS – Event of the ISU Challenger Series
- TBD – Assigned
- WD – Withdrew from event
- Medals at team events are awarded for the team results only. Individual placements at team events are listed in parentheses.
  - In the case of the Olympic Games, if the skater competed in one competition segment then their placement in that segment is listed in parentheses. If the skater competed in both the short program and free skate segments then their highest segment placement is listed in parentheses.

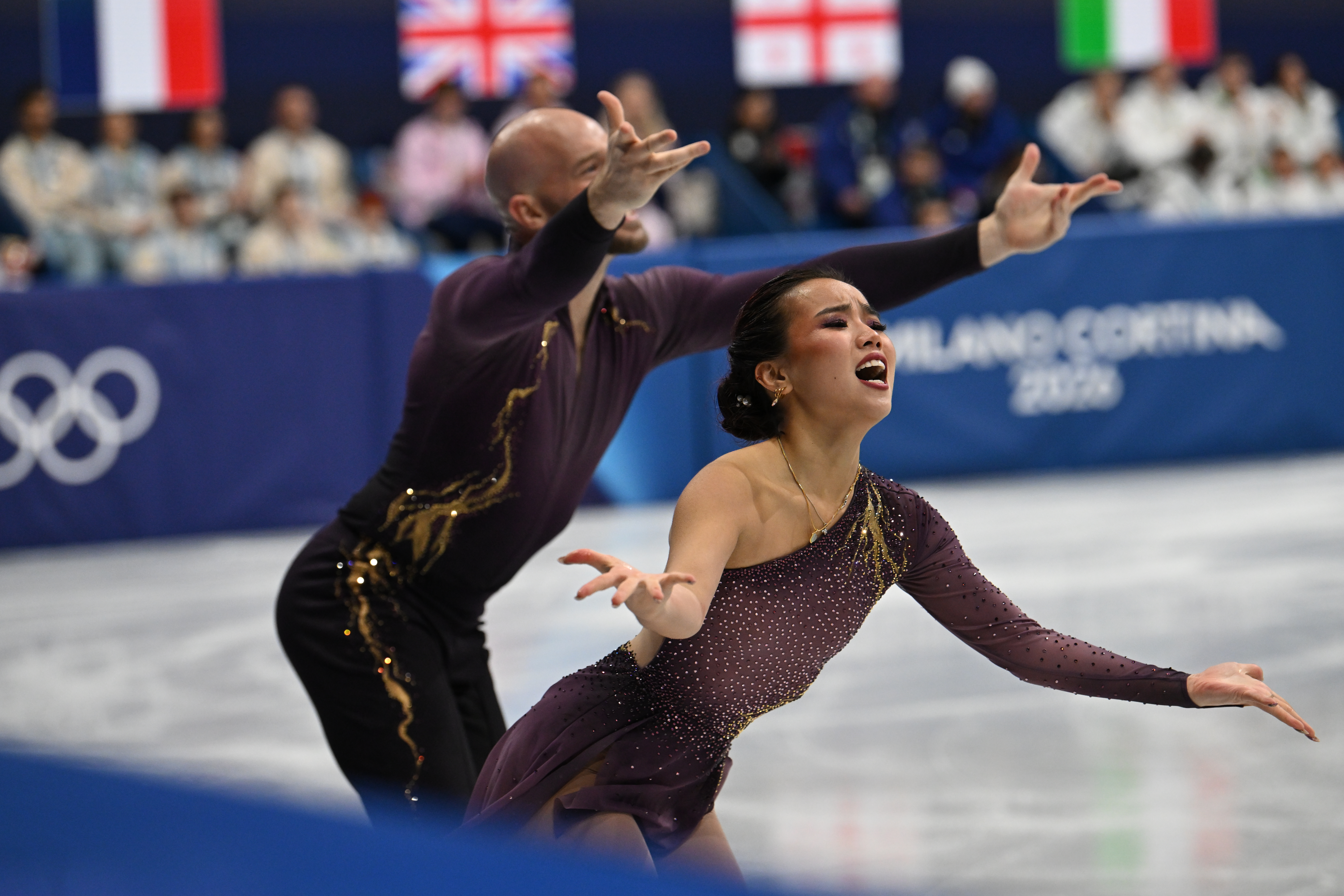
O'Shea and Kam at the 2026 Winter Olympics

=== Pair skating with Ellie Kam ===
Competition placements at senior level
Season	2022–23	2023–24	2024–25	2025–26
Winter Olympics				9th
Winter Olympics (Team event)				1st
World Championships	12th	11th	7th	
Four Continents Championships	6th	3rd	4th	
Grand Prix Final			5th	
U.S. Championships	3rd	1st	3rd	2nd
GP France		WD		
GP Finland		6th		3rd
GP NHK Trophy			3rd	
GP Skate America			2nd	
GP Skate Canada				3rd
CS Finlandia Trophy		1st		
CS Golden Spin of Zagreb	2nd			
CS John Nicks Pairs			1st	
CS Nebelhorn Trophy			3rd	
CS Trialeti Trophy				5th
Ice Challenge	1st			

=== Pair skating with Chelsea Liu ===
Competition placements at senior level
Season	2021–22
GP Skate America	7th
CS Warsaw Cup	WD
Cranberry Cup	5th
John Nicks Pairs	4th

=== Pair skating with Tarah Kayne ===
Competition placements at senior level
Season	2012–13	2013–14	2014–15	2015–16	2016–17	2017–18	2018–19	2019–20	2020–21
World Championships				13th					
Four Continents Championships		2nd	8th	4th		1st	6th	5th	
U.S. Championships	7th	6th	3rd	1st	WD	2nd	4th	3rd	
GP Cup of China								6th	
GP France							2nd		
GP NHK Trophy					4th		5th	6th	
GP Rostelecom Cup				4th					
GP Skate America				6th	6th				5th
CS Finlandia Trophy					5th		7th		
CS Golden Spin of Zagreb			3rd	3rd		3rd		2nd	
CS Tallinn Trophy							2nd		
CS U.S. Classic		3rd		1st				4th	
Challenge Cup	2nd								
Ice Challenge		3rd							

=== Single skating ===
Competition placements at junior level
Season	2007–08	2008–09
U.S. Championships		10th
JGP Italy		13th
Challenge Cup	2nd	

== Detailed results ==
=== Pair skating with Ellie Kam ===
ISU personal best scores in the +5/-5 GOE System
Segment	Type	Score	Event
Total	TSS	201.73	2024 Skate America
Short program	TSS	73.16	2024 CS Nebelhorn Trophy
Short program	TES	40.58	2024 CS Nebelhorn Trophy
Short program	PCS	33.06	2026 Winter Olympics
Free skating	TSS	135.36	2026 Winter Olympics (Team event)
Free skating	TES	69.65	2026 Winter Olympics (Team event)
Free skating	PCS	66.37	2024 Skate America

- Small medals for the short program and free skating are only awarded at ISU Championships.

Results in the 2022–23 season
Date	Event	SP		FS		Total	
Date	Event	P	Score	P	Score	P	Score
Nov 9–13, 2022	(Austria) 2022 Ice Challenge	1	65.35	1	117.84	1	183.19
Dec 7–10, 2022	(Croatia) 2022 CS Golden Spin of Zagreb	3	62.07	2	116.76	2	178.83
Jan 26–28, 2023	(United States) 2023 U.S. Championships	3	65.75	3	118.26	3	184.01
Feb 7–12, 2023	(United States) 2023 Four Continents Championships	7	57.49	5	111.20	6	168.69
Mar 20–26, 2023	(Japan) 2023 World Championships	9	63.40	13	112.19	12	175.59

Results in the 2023–24 season
Date	Event	SP		FS		Total	
Date	Event	P	Score	P	Score	P	Score
Oct 4–8, 2023	(Finland) 2023 CS Finlandia Trophy	1	63.03	1	119.04	1	182.07
Nov 3–5, 2023	2023 Grand Prix de France	5	54.75	—N/a	—N/a	–	WD
Nov 17–19, 2023	(Finland) 2023 Grand Prix of Espoo	6	55.99	6	96.17	6	152.16
Jan 22–28, 2024	(United States) 2024 U.S. Championships	2	64.57	2	123.19	1	187.76
Jan 30 – Feb 4, 2024	(China) 2024 Four Continents Championships	4	60.72	2	126.56	3	187.28
Mar 18–24, 2024	(Canada) 2024 World Championships	10	64.44	11	115.97	11	180.41

Results in the 2024–25 season
Date	Event	SP		FS		Total	
Date	Event	P	Score	P	Score	P	Score
Sep 3–4, 2024	(United States) 2024 CS John Nicks Pairs Competition	1	67.46	2	124.16	1	191.62
Sep 18–21, 2024	(Germany) 2024 CS Nebelhorn Trophy	2	73.16	7	111.22	3	184.38
Oct 18–20, 2024	(United States) 2024 Skate America	2	70.66	2	131.07	2	201.73
Nov 8–10, 2024	(Japan) 2024 NHK Trophy	3	69.15	3	128.29	3	197.44
Dec 5–8, 2024	(France) 2024–25 Grand Prix Final	5	68.91	5	129.35	5	198.26
Jan 20–26, 2025	(United States) 2025 U.S. Championships	1	77.19	5	112.38	3	189.57
Feb 19–23, 2025	(South Korea) 2025 Four Continents Championships	2	70.32	4	126.62	4	196.94
Mar 25–30, 2025	(United States) 2025 World Championships	5	68.61	7	126.77	7	195.38

Results in the 2025–26 season
Date	Event	SP		FS		Total	
Date	Event	P	Score	P	Score	P	Score
Oct 8–11, 2025	(Georgia (country)) 2025 CS Trialeti Trophy	5	62.74	5	113.58	5	176.32
Oct 31 – Nov 2, 2025	2025 Skate Canada International	4	65.48	2	133.63	3	199.11
Nov 21–23, 2025	(Finland) 2025 Finlandia Trophy	2	70.24	3	128.85	3	199.09
Jan 4–11, 2026	(United States) 2026 U.S. Championships	3	67.13	2	129.99	2	197.12
Feb 6–8, 2026	(Italy) 2026 Winter Olympics – Team event	5	66.59	4	135.36	1	—N/a
Feb 6–19, 2026	(Italy) 2026 Winter Olympics	7	71.87	12	122.71	9	194.58

=== Pair skating with Chelsea Liu ===
ISU personal best scores in the +5/-5 GOE System
Segment	Type	Score	Event
Total	TSS	175.40	2021 Skate America
Short program	TSS	62.55	2021 CS Warsaw Cup
Short program	TES	34.63	2021 CS Warsaw Cup
Short program	PCS	28.92	2021 Skate America
Free skating	TSS	115.24	2021 Skate America
Free skating	TES	57.13	2021 Skate America
Free skating	PCS	60.11	2021 Skate America

Results in the 2021–22 season
Date	Event	SP		FS		Total	
Date	Event	P	Score	P	Score	P	Score
Aug 13–15, 2021	(United States) 2021 Cranberry Cup International	6	56.31	5	108.89	5	165.20
Sep 9–10, 2021	(United States) 2021 John Nicks Pairs Challenge	3	66.67	5	110.78	4	177.45
Oct 22–24, 2021	(United States) 2021 Skate America	7	60.16	7	115.24	7	175.40
Nov 17–20, 2021	(Poland) 2021 CS Warsaw Cup	5	62.55	—N/a	—N/a	–	WD

=== Pair skating with Tarah Kayne ===
ISU personal best scores in the +5/-5 GOE System
Segment	Type	Score	Event
Total	TSS	194.29	2019 CS Golden Spin of Zagreb
Short program	TSS	66.34	2019 Four Continents Championships
Short program	TES	36.96	2019 CS Golden Spin of Zagreb
Short program	PCS	30.66	2020 Four Continents Championships
Free skating	TSS	128.09	2019 CS Golden Spin of Zagreb
Free skating	TES	66.13	2018 Internationaux de France
Free skating	PCS	62.24	2019 CS Golden Spin of Zagreb

ISU personal best scores in the +3/-3 GOE System
Segment	Type	Score	Event
Total	TSS	194.42	2018 Four Continents Championships
Short program	TSS	65.74	2018 Four Continents Championships
Short program	TES	35.80	2014 Four Continents Championships
Short program	PCS	30.03	2018 Four Continents Championships
Free skating	TSS	128.68	2018 Four Continents Championships
Free skating	TES	65.73	2018 Four Continents Championships
Free skating	PCS	62.95	2018 Four Continents Championships

- Small medals for the short program and free skating are only awarded at ISU Championships.
- At national events in the United States, pewter medals are awarded for fourth place.

Results in the 2012–13 season
Date	Event	SP		FS		Total	
Date	Event	P	Score	P	Score	P	Score
Jan 20–27, 2013	(United States) 2013 U.S. Championships	9	47.74	7	100.58	7	148.32
Feb 21–24, 2013	(Netherlands) 2013 International Challenge Cup	3	54.11	2	113.71	2	167.82

Results in the 2013–14 season
Date	Event	SP		FS		Total	
Date	Event	P	Score	P	Score	P	Score
Sep 12–14, 2013	(United States) 2013 U.S. International Classic	4	60.31	3	106.96	3	167.27
Nov 19–24, 2013	(Austria) 2013 Ice Challenge	3	53.97	2	103.68	3	157.65
Jan 5–12, 2014	(United States) 2014 U.S. Championships	7	61.48	6	112.41	6	173.89
Jan 20–25, 2014	(Taiwan) 2014 Four Continents Championships	3	62.05	2	119.40	2	181.45

Results in the 2014–15 season
Date	Event	SP		FS		Total	
Date	Event	P	Score	P	Score	P	Score
Dec 4–6, 2014	(Croatia) 2014 CS Golden Spin of Zagreb	3	50.72	3	111.00	3	161.72
Jan 17–25, 2015	(United States) 2015 U.S. Championships	4	61.56	3	123.75	3	185.31
Feb 10–15, 2015	(South Korea) 2015 Four Continents Championships	8	57.91	8	108.76	8	166.67

Results in the 2015–16 season
Date	Event	SP		FS		Total	
Date	Event	P	Score	P	Score	P	Score
Sep 16–20, 2015	(United States) 2015 CS U.S. International Classic	3	54.30	1	116.00	1	170.30
Oct 22–25, 2015	(United States) 2015 Skate America	6	58.38	5	107.61	6	165.99
Nov 20–22, 2015	(Russia) 2015 Rostelecom Cup	6	58.78	4	122.45	4	181.23
Dec 2–5, 2015	(Croatia) 2015 CS Golden Spin of Zagreb	6	55.58	1	119.38	3	174.96
Jan 15–24, 2016	(United States) 2016 U.S. Championships	1	69.61	1	142.04	1	211.65
Feb 16–21, 2016	(Taiwan) 2016 Four Continents Championships	7	59.72	4	122.30	4	182.02
Mar 28 – Apr 3, 2016	(United States) 2016 World Championships	14	59.27	11	118.96	13	178.23

Results in the 2016–17 season
Date	Event	SP		FS		Total	
Date	Event	P	Score	P	Score	P	Score
Oct 6–10, 2016	(Finland) 2016 CS Finlandia Trophy	4	54.65	5	103.46	5	158.11
Oct 21–23, 2016	(United States) 2016 Skate America	8	57.93	3	115.57	6	173.50
Nov 25–27, 2016	(Japan) 2016 NHK Trophy	5	57.02	4	115.18	4	172.20
Jan 14–22, 2017	(United States) 2017 U.S. Championships	5	61.80	—N/a	—N/a	–	WD

Results in the 2017–18 season
Date	Event	SP		FS		Total	
Date	Event	P	Score	P	Score	P	Score
Dec 6–9, 2017	(Croatia) 2017 CS Golden Spin of Zagreb	3	56.38	3	105.88	3	162.26
Jan 3–7, 2018	(United States) 2018 U.S. Championships	2	68.93	2	131.87	2	200.80
Jan 22–28, 2018	(Taiwan) 2018 Four Continents Championships	3	65.74	1	128.68	1	194.42

Results in the 2018–19 season
Date	Event	SP		FS		Total	
Date	Event	P	Score	P	Score	P	Score
Oct 4–7, 2018	(Finland) 2018 CS Finlandia Trophy	7	52.53	6	109.50	7	162.03
Nov 9–11, 2018	(Japan) 2018 NHK Trophy	5	59.00	5	105.16	5	164.16
Nov 23–25, 2018	2018 Internationaux de France	4	63.45	2	127.98	2	191.43
Nov 26 – Dec 2, 2018	(Estonia) 2018 CS Tallinn Trophy	4	57.28	1	120.41	2	177.69
Jan 19–27, 2019	(United States) 2019 U.S. Championships	1	71.83	4	126.81	4	198.64
Feb 7–10, 2019	(United States) 2019 Four Continents Championships	5	66.34	6	114.02	6	180.36

Results in the 2019–20 season
Date	Event	SP		FS		Total	
Date	Event	P	Score	P	Score	P	Score
Sep 17–22, 2019	(United States) 2019 CS U.S. International Classic	4	64.90	4	109.12	4	174.02
Nov 8–10, 2019	2019 Cup of China	5	64.08	6	114.71	6	178.79
Nov 22–24, 2019	(Japan) 2019 NHK Trophy	7	58.70	5	120.03	6	178.73
Dec 4–7, 2019	(Croatia) 2019 CS Golden Spin of Zagreb	3	66.20	2	128.09	2	194.29
Jan 20–26, 2020	(United States) 2020 U.S. Championships	2	70.35	3	133.72	3	204.07
Feb 4–9, 2020	(South Korea) 2020 Four Continents Championships	7	62.65	5	123.55	5	186.20

Results in the 2020–21 season
Date	Event	SP		FS		Total	
Date	Event	P	Score	P	Score	P	Score
Oct 23–24, 2020	(United States) 2020 Skate America	5	59.86	5	114.49	5	174.35
