= Blackbeard (musical) =

Musical by Rob Gardner

- Music: Rob Gardner
- Lyrics: Rob Gardner
- Book: Rob Gardner
- Productions: 2008 Phoenix, Arizona; 2009 Bunbury, Western Australia
- Awards: Arizoni Awards: Best Original Musical; Best Musical Script; Best Original Music Composition

Blackbeard, or officially, Blackbeard: The Musical or Blackbeard: A New Musical, is a musical created by Rob Gardner. The plot focuses on the notorious pirate Edward "Blackbeard" Teach, and his blockade of Charles Town in South Carolina in 1718. The musical portrays Blackbeard as a compassionate person, who is deeply in love with a woman on his ship named Mary Ormond. Blackbeard struggles to maintain his fierce façade, while at the same time trying to win the heart of the pacifistic Mary.

Blackbeard debuted at the Herberger Theatre Center in Phoenix, Arizona, on September 5, 2008, under the direction of Cambrian James and the musical direction of Rob Gardner himself. Marketed as a 'pre-Broadway event', the musical received mixed to positive reviews from critics, and won 9 AriZoni Awards from 15 nominations. On May 1, 2009, Blackbeard made its Australian premiere in Bunbury, Western Australia.

== Background ==
"...(on the television) they had this short segment on Blackbeard, mostly about his final battle on ship with Lt. Maynard, and it just captured my attention... Like most people, I'd heard the name Blackbeard, but never really knew his story. And here he was, this real pirate, in what appeared to be the classic battle of good versus evil. It was fascinating and I had to know more."

— Rob Gardner, 2008-08-17

In an interview with Broadway World, Gardner said his inspiration for creating the musical was a documentary he saw on television about Blackbeard. Fascinated, he researched his life, and found that most of his apparent deeds were legend, rather than fact. He also found that Blackbeard had a notable fondness for women, marrying fourteen women, of whom he only married Mary legitimately. As Broadway World writes: "it was this multi-layered, paradoxical character that Gardner chose as the protagonist for his new musical".

Blackbeard had a successful workshop run in the summer of 2007 in Phoenix, for which it was nominated for all its AriZoni awards. After the show was subsequently 'reworked and re-imagined', the show premiered globally on September 5 at Herberger Theatre Center in Phoenix, running until September 27.

In November 2007, the director of the Bunbury production negotiated the rights for the Australian premiere of Blackbeard with Gardner. Blackbeard premiered in Bunbury on May 1, 2009, but only performed two shows.

== Characters ==
- Edward 'Blackbeard' Teach: The notorious pirate who is more concerned about how he is perceived by his enemies and in legend than his deeds.
- Mary Ormond: Blackbeard's love interest, she exhibits strong love for Blackbeard, but is conflicted by his sadistic, inhumane ways.
- Lieutenant Robert Maynard: A lieutenant of the Royal Navy stationed in South Carolina, Maynard is humble, compassionate, and deeply in love with his fiancée Anne.
- Anne: Robert Maynard's fiancée. Anne is taken hostage by Blackbeard, and opposes his attempts to scare her.
- Stede Bonnet: A collaborator with Blackbeard who works as a piracy advisor for Governor Johnson. Bonnet is a fancy, overweight and camp character, who acts as comical relief in the musical.
- Governor Robert Johnson: The governor of South Carolina, who authorizes the plans to deal with Blackbeard. He doesn't trust Maynard entirely due to his sincere affection for Anne.
- Mr. Israel Hands: Blackbeard's second-in-command. Mr. Hands is superstitious and intimidated by Blackbeard, but also encourages him to be evil.
- Georgette: The barmaid at a tavern near Charleston.

== Reception ==
Blackbeard has received mixed reviews, tending towards the positive, with almost universal acclaim for the music score. Pasha Yamotahari of The Pashavian Review, a reviewer of Arizonian theatre, wrote that the musical lacked "clarity in its structure and goal", but praising the music score as "magical". Paula Shulak of theatermaven.com also held the music score in high acclaim, but stressed that Blackbeard's major flaw was its script and its thin plot. Showup.com, a website that collates amateur reviews and ratings of musicals, gave Blackbeard an average rating of 4.4 out of 5 stars.

== Factual inaccuracies ==
The director's notes of the Bunbury production of Blackbeard state that "though not completely historically accurate, the main storyline is based on truth". Though all of the main characters are based on real people, bar Anne and Georgette, their fates differed considerably from their interpretations in the musical, or are completely unaccounted for. The characters' actual fates include:

- Blackbeard: Blackbeard's blockade of Charleston Harbour is mostly accurate, however, Blackbeard did not die as a result of the blockade. He left Charleston Harbour, after receiving his ransom chest of medicine and releasing his hostages without their clothing and jewellery, and accepted a pardon from the North Carolina governor Charles Eden, who had previously conspired with Blackbeard to receive treasures in exchange for unofficial protection. Blackbeard returned to piracy shortly after his pardoning, attracting the attention of the Governor of Virginia, Alexander Spotswood. Spotswood mobilised 60 soldiers, under the command of Lt. Maynard. Blackbeard's crew of 20 fought Maynard's forces at Ocracoke, North Carolina. Blackbeard is reported to have suffered five bullet wounds and over twenty severe sword wounds before dying. Maynard decapitated his corpse and hung his head on the bowsprit of his ship.
- Mary: Mary married Blackbeard at Bath, North Carolina, at least several months before his death. Mary was just 16 years old at the time, and the daughter of a wealthy plantation owner. It's been claimed that Blackbeard forced Mary to prostitute herself to the other crew members, and it is probable that she bore at least one child. Her ultimate fate is unknown.
- Stede Bonnet: Bonnet indeed collaborated with Blackbeard, but a fortnight before Blackbeard's death, he faced charges of piracy, and was hanged, eighteen days after Blackbeard's death.
- Israel Hands: Hands, according to Daniel Defoe's A General History of the Robberies and Murders of the most notorious Pyrates, is believed to have died a poor and homeless man in London.

== Awards ==
Blackbeard's 2007 Phoenix workshop production garnered 15 AriZoni nominations with 9 wins, most notably 'Best Original Production for a Musical', 'Best Original Script for a Musical', and 'Best Original Music Composition'.
