= 2025 Finlandia Trophy =

International figure skating competition

- Type: Grand Prix
- Date: 21 – 23 November
- Season: 2025–26
- Location: Helsinki, Finland
- Host: Skating Finland
- Venue: Helsinki Ice Hall

Champions
- Men's singles: (Japan) Yuma Kagiyama
- Women's singles: (Japan) Mone Chiba
- Pairs: (Germany) Minerva Fabienne Hase and Nikita Volodin
- Ice dance: (France) Laurence Fournier Beaudry and Guillaume Cizeron
- Previous: 2024 Finlandia Trophy
- Next: 2026 Finlandia Trophy
- Previous Grand Prix: 2025 Skate America
- Next Grand Prix: 2025–26 Grand Prix Final

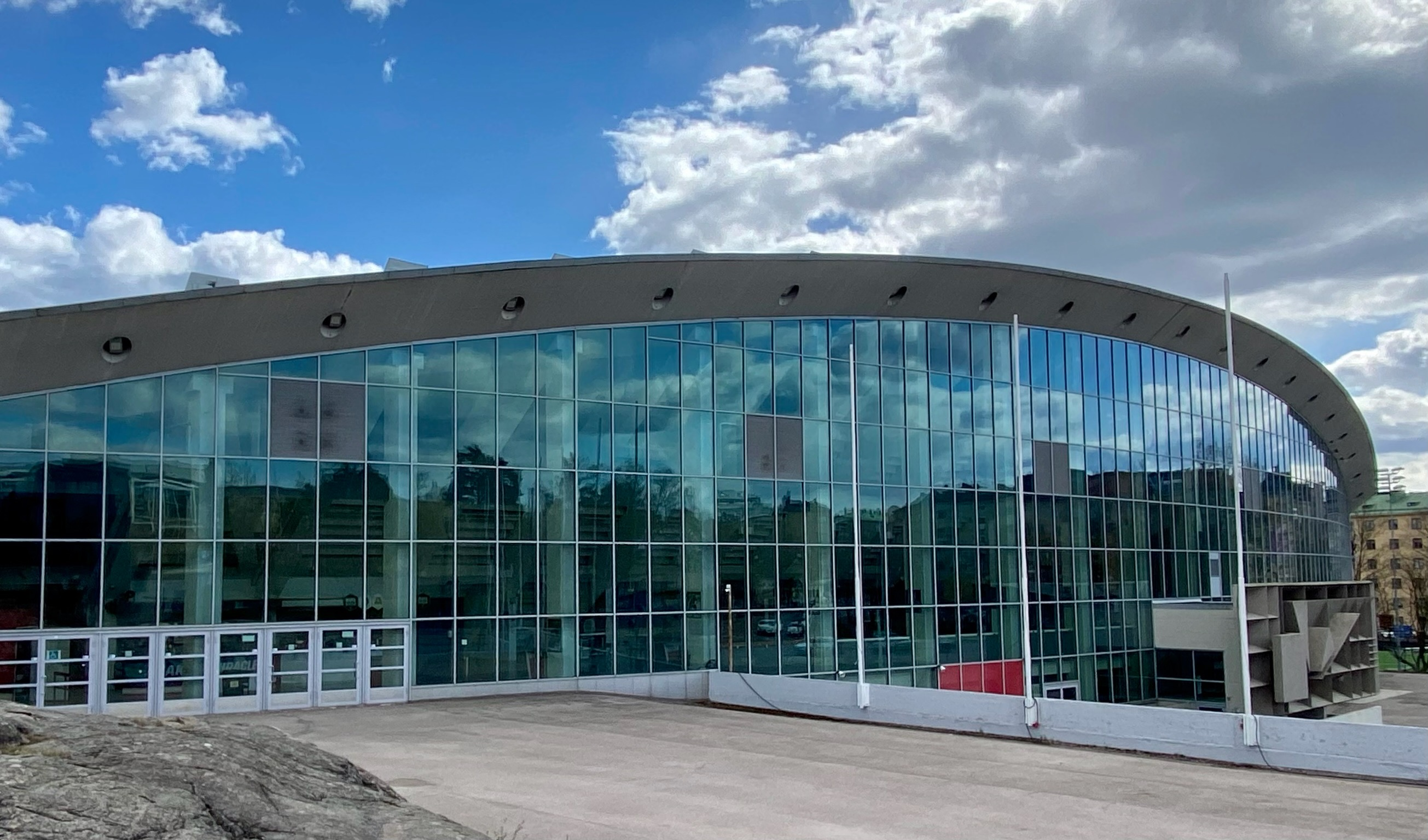
The 2025 Finlandia Trophy took place at the Helsinki Ice Hall in Helsinki, Finland.

The 2025 Finlandia Trophy was a figure skating competition sanctioned by the International Skating Union (ISU). Organized and hosted by Skating Finland, it was the sixth event of the 2025–26 Grand Prix of Figure Skating series: a senior-level international invitational competition series. It was held from 21 to 23 November at the Helsinki Ice Hall in Helsinki, Finland. Medals were awarded in men's singles, women's singles, pair skating, and ice dance. Skaters also earned points based on their results and the top skaters or teams in each discipline at the end of the season were then invited to compete at the 2025–26 Grand Prix Final in Nagoya, Japan. Yuma Kagiyama and Mone Chiba of Japan won the men's and women's events, respectively. Minerva Fabienne Hase and Nikita Volodin of Germany won the pairs event, and Laurence Fournier Beaudry and Guillaume Cizeron of France won the ice dance event. The unusually harsh judging of the ice dance event prompted an outcry from both skaters and their coaches, leading the ISU to announce a formal review of the matter.

== Background ==
The ISU Grand Prix of Figure Skating is a series of seven events sanctioned by the International Skating Union (ISU) and held during the autumn: six qualifying events and the Grand Prix of Figure Skating Final. This allows skaters to perfect their programs earlier in the season, as well as compete against the skaters whom they would later encounter at the World Championships. Skaters earn points based on their results in their respective competitions and the top skaters or teams in each discipline are invited to compete at the Grand Prix Final. The first edition of the Grand Prix of Finland was held in 2018 in Helsinki as a replacement event for the Cup of China – a long-time event in the Grand Prix series – after the Chinese Skating Association declined to host any international skating events in order to prepare its venues for the 2022 Winter Olympics. Following the 2022 Russian invasion of Ukraine, the Rostelecom Cup, which had been scheduled in Russia for that November, was cancelled. As such, the Grand Prix of Finland was staged to serve as its replacement. In 2024, the Grand Prix of Finland adopted the name Finlandia Trophy, which had previously been the name of Finland's Challenger Series event.

The 2025 Finlandia Trophy was the sixth event of the 2025–26 Grand Prix of Figure Skating series, and was held from 21 to 23 November at the Helsinki Ice Hall in Helsinki, Finland. Upon completion of the Finlandia Trophy, the top six skaters and teams in each discipline – men's singles, women's singles, pair skating, and ice dance – were invited to compete at the 2025 Grand Prix of Figure Skating Final in Nagoya, Japan.

== Changes to preliminary assignments ==
The International Skating Union published the initial list of entrants on 6 June 2025.

Changes to preliminary assignments
Discipline	Withdrew		Added		Notes	Ref.
Discipline	Date	Skater(s)	Date	Skater(s)	Notes	Ref.
Men	—N/a		15 September	(Finland); Valtter Virtanen	Host picks	
Women	—N/a		15 September	(Finland); Olivia Lisko	Host picks	
Women	—N/a		15 September	(Finland); Selma Välitalo	Host picks	
Men	13 October	(United States); Lucas Broussard	15 October	(Canada); Stephen Gogolev	—N/a	
Women	10 November	(Estonia); Niina Petrõkina	—N/a		Medical reasons	
Ice dance	13 November	(Finland); Juulia Turkkila; Matthias Versluis	14 November	(United Kingdom); Phebe Bekker; James Hernandez	Injury (Versluis)	

== Required performance elements ==
=== Single skating ===
Men and women competing in single skating performed their short programs on 21 November. Lasting 2 minutes 40 seconds (+/− 10 seconds), the short program had to include the following elements:

For men: one double or triple Axel; one triple or quadruple jump; one jump combination consisting of a double jump and a triple jump, two triple jumps, or a quadruple jump and a double jump or triple jump; one flying spin; one camel spin or sit spin with a change of foot; one spin combination with a change of foot; and a step sequence using the full ice surface.

For women: one double or triple Axel; one triple jump; one jump combination consisting of a double jump and a triple jump, or two triple jumps; one flying spin; one layback spin, sideways leaning spin, camel spin, or sit spin without a change of foot; one spin combination with a change of foot; and one step sequence using the full ice surface.

Men and women performed their free skates on 22 November. Lasting 4 minutes (+/− 10 seconds), the free skate had to include the following: seven jump elements, of which one had to be an Axel-type jump; three spins, of which one had to be a spin combination, one a flying spin, and one a spin with only one position; a step sequence; and a choreographic sequence.

=== Pairs ===
Couples competing in pair skating performed their short programs on 21 November. Lasting 2 minutes 40 seconds (+/− 10 seconds), the short program had to include the following elements: one pair lift, one double or triple twist lift, one double or triple throw jump, one double or triple solo jump, one solo spin combination with a change of foot, one death spiral, and a step sequence using the full ice surface.

Couples performed their free skates on 22 November. Lasting 4 minutes (+/− 10 seconds), the free skate had to include the following: three pair lifts, of which one has to be a twist lift; two different throw jumps; one solo jump; one jump combination or sequence; one pair spin combination; one death spiral; and a choreographic sequence.

=== Ice dance ===
Couples competing in ice dance performed their rhythm dances on 21 November. Lasting 2 minutes 50 seconds (+/− 10 seconds), the theme of the rhythm dance this season was "music, dance styles, and feeling of the 1990s". Examples of applicable dance styles and music included pop, Latin, house, techno, hip-hop, and grunge. The rhythm dance had to include the following elements: one pattern dance step sequence, one choreographic rhythm sequence, one dance lift, one set of sequential twizzles, and one step sequence.

Couples then performed their free dances on 22 November. Lasting 4 minutes (+/− 10 seconds), the free dance had to include the following: three dance lifts or one short lift and one combination lift; one dance spin; one set of synchronized twizzles; one step sequence in hold; one step sequence while on one skate and not in hold, and three choreographic elements.

== Judging ==
Skaters were judged according to the required technical elements of their program (such as jumps and spins), as well as the overall presentation of their program, based on three program components (skating skills, presentation, and composition). Each technical element in a figure skating performance was assigned a predetermined base point value and scored by a panel of nine judges on a scale from −5 to +5 based on the quality of its execution. Each Grade of Execution (GOE) from –5 to +5 was assigned a value as indicated on the Scale of Values. For example, a triple Axel was worth a base value of 8.00 points, and a GOE of +3 was worth 2.40 points, so a triple Axel with a GOE of +3 earned 10.40 points. The judging panel's GOE for each element was determined by calculating the trimmed mean (the average after discarding the highest and lowest scores). The panel's scores for all elements were added together to generate a Total Elements Score. At the same time, the judges evaluated each performance based on the five aforementioned program components and assigned each a score from 0.25 to 10 in 0.25-point increments. The judging panel's final score for each program component was also determined by calculating the trimmed mean. Those scores were then multiplied by the factor shown on the chart below; the results were added together to generate a total Program Component Score.

Program component factoring
Discipline	Short program or Rhythm dance	Free skate or Free dance
Men	1.67	3.33
Women	1.33	2.67
Pairs	1.33	2.67
Ice dance	1.33	2.00

Deductions were applied for certain violations, such as time infractions or falls. The Total Elements Score and Program Component Score were then added together, minus any deductions, to generate a final performance score for each skater or team.

== Medal summary ==
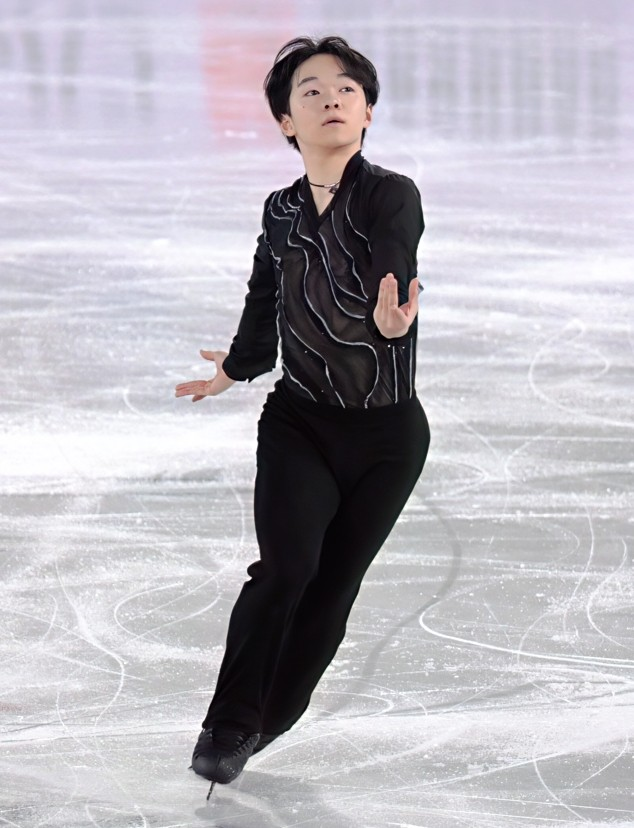
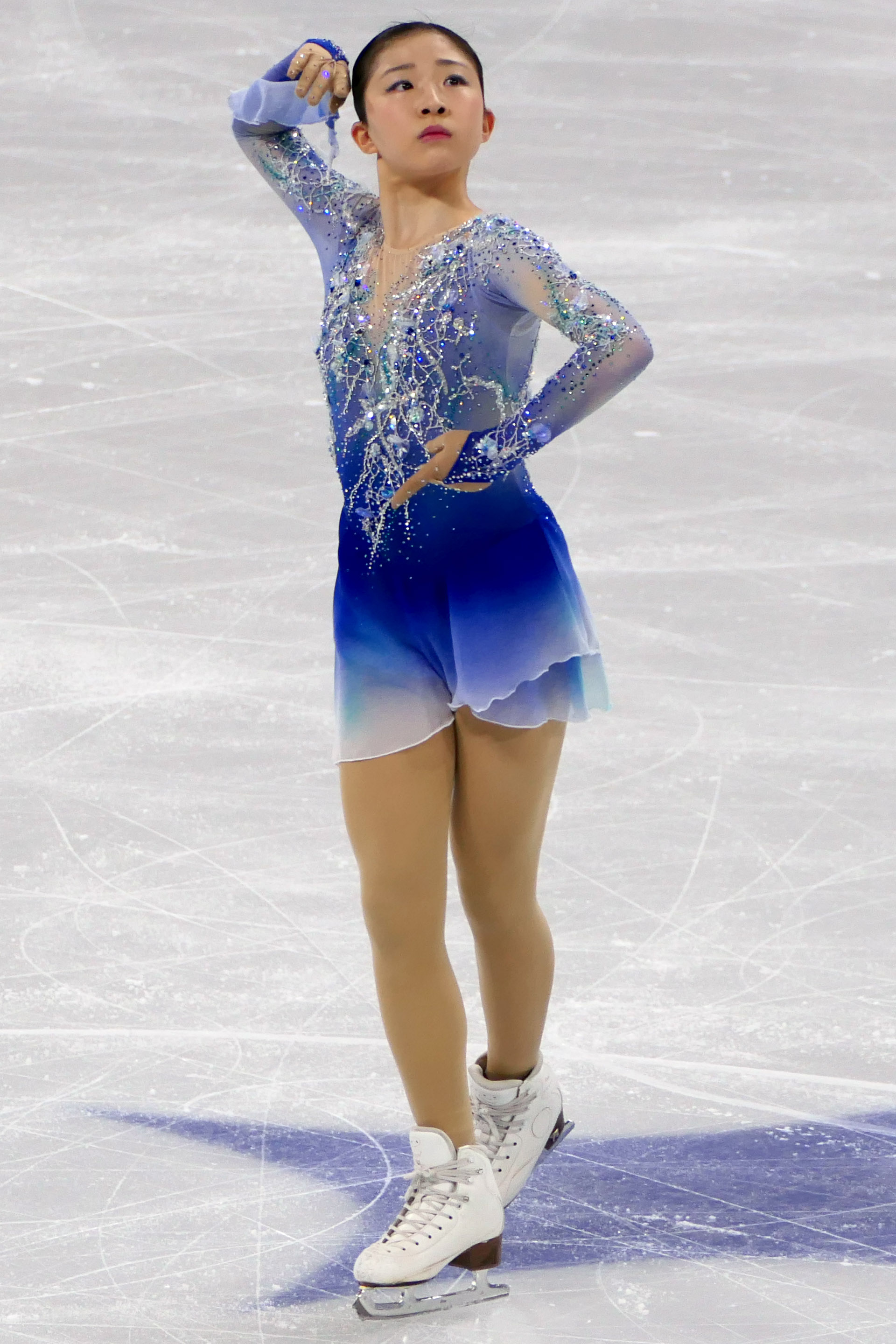
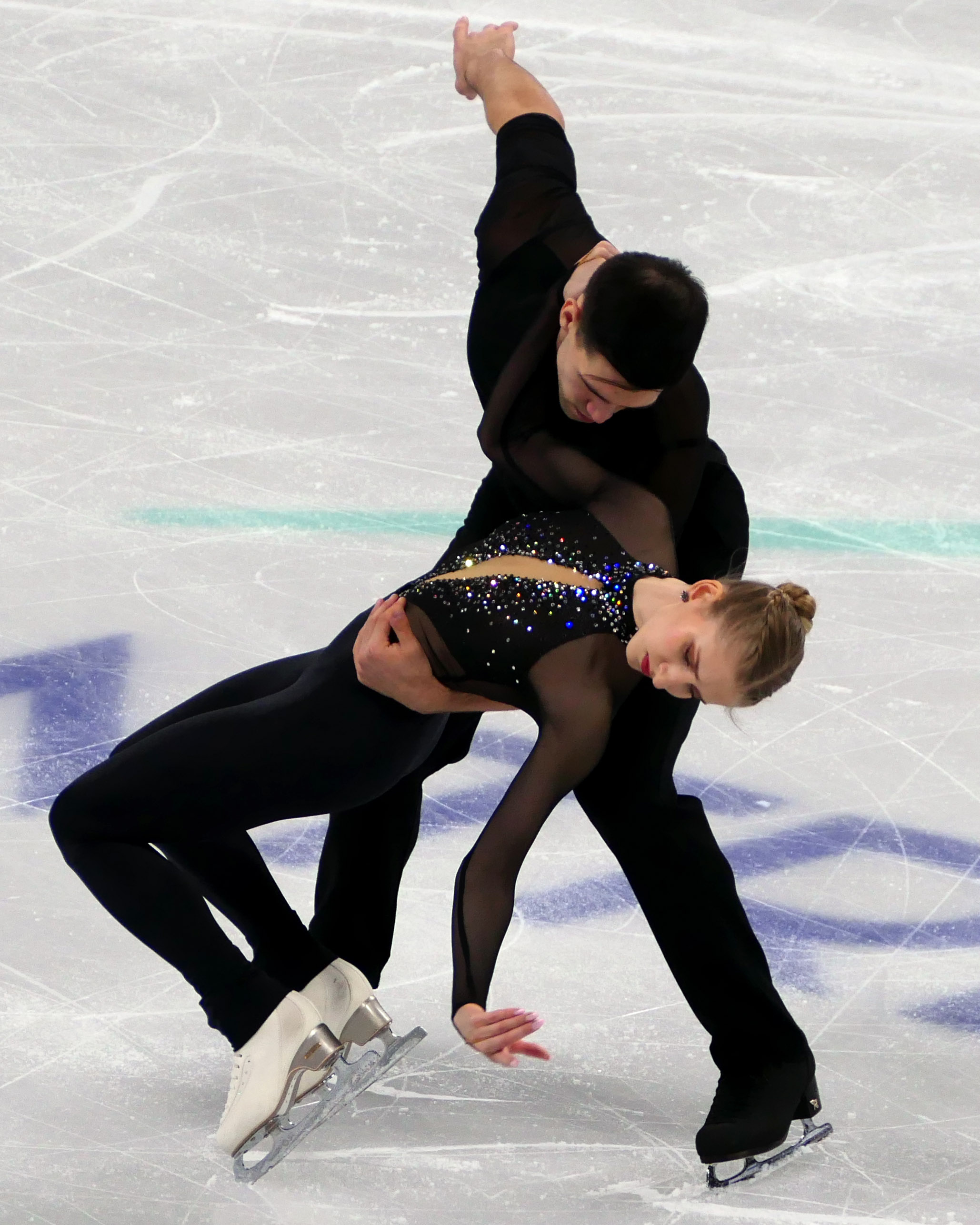
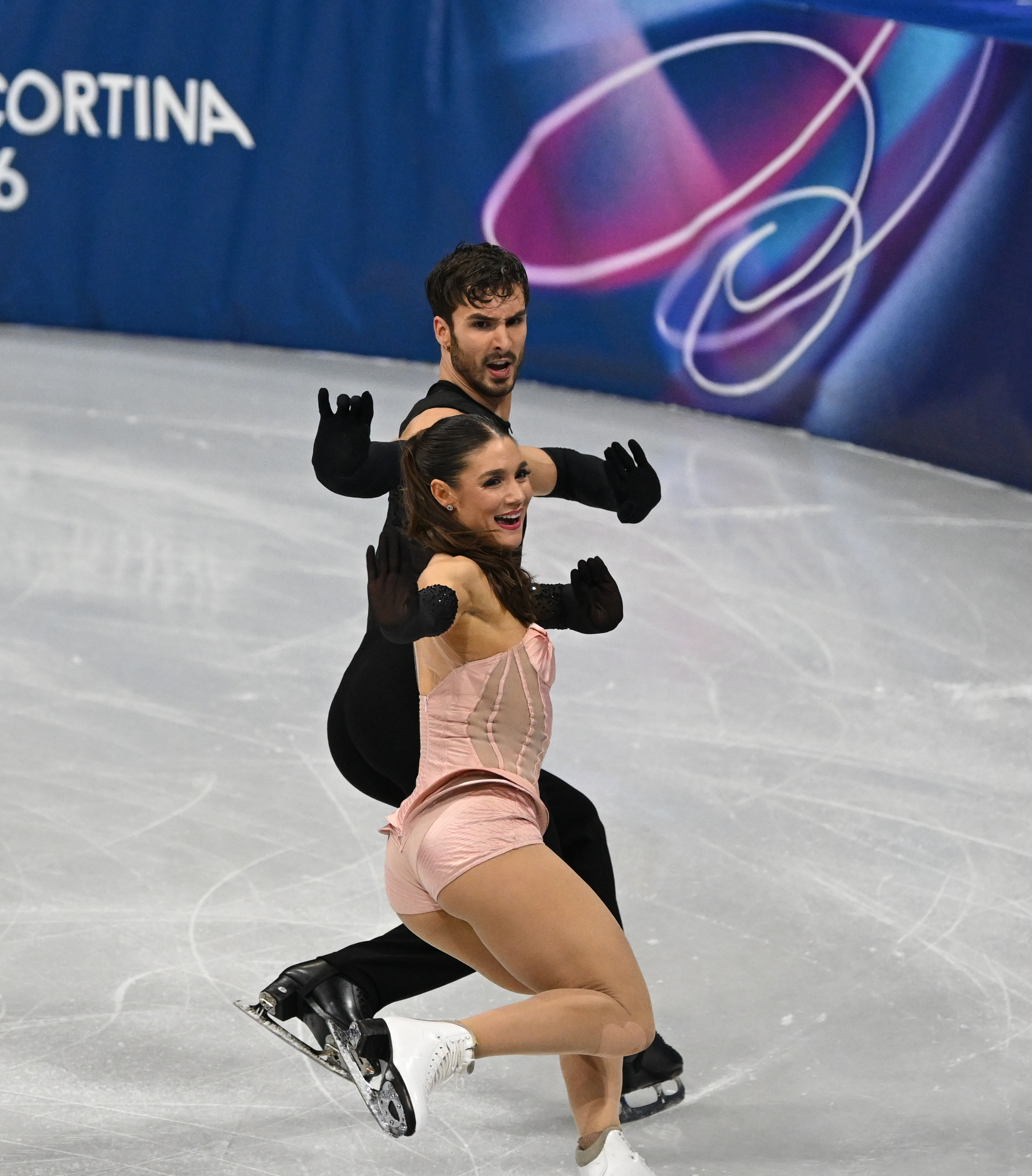
The 2025 Finlandia Trophy champions (from left to right): Yuma Kagiyama of Japan (men's singles); Mone Chiba of Japan (women's singles); Minerva Fabienne Hase and Nikita Volodin of Germany (pair skating); and Laurence Fournier Beaudry and Guillaume Cizeron of France (ice dance)

Medalists
Discipline	Gold	Silver	Bronze
Men	(Japan) Yuma Kagiyama	(France) Adam Siao Him Fa	(Canada) Stephen Gogolev
Women	(Japan) Mone Chiba	(United States) Amber Glenn	(Japan) Rino Matsuike
Pairs	(Germany); Minerva Fabienne Hase; Nikita Volodin	(United States); Alisa Efimova; Misha Mitrofanov	(United States); Ellie Kam; Daniel O'Shea
Ice dance	(France); Laurence Fournier Beaudry; Guillaume Cizeron	(Canada); Piper Gilles; Paul Poirier	(United States); Emilea Zingas; Vadym Kolesnik

== Results ==
=== Men's singles ===
Yuma Kagiyama of Japan secured his spot at the 2025 Grand Prix Final with his victory at the Finlandia Trophy. Kagiyama fell on his quadruple toe loop during his free skate, but still finished with the highest score in the free skate and overall. Adam Siao Him Fa of France, who had been in first place after the short program, made several errors in his jumps and finished in second place. "I was very nervous and it was very stressful, but overall there are a lot of positives from this event," Siao Him Fa stated. "A lot of stuff happened before the competition that could have put my confidence a bit down but somehow I kind of managed with all of that." Siao Him Fa also secured a spot at the Grand Prix Final. Stephen Gogolev of Canada finished in third place, marking the first time Gogolev had won a medal at a Grand Prix competition.

Men's results
Rank	Skater	Nation	Total points	SP		FS	
1st place, gold medalist(s)	Yuma Kagiyama	Japan	270.45	3	88.16	1	182.29
2nd place, silver medalist(s)	Adam Siao Him Fa	France	256.98	1	92.50	2	164.48
3rd place, bronze medalist(s)	Stephen Gogolev	Canada	253.61	2	89.35	3	164.26
4	Roman Sadovsky	Canada	243.29	6	82.91	4	160.38
5	Jason Brown	United States	243.17	4	87.66	6	155.51
6	Sōta Yamamoto	Japan	238.45	7	81.09	5	157.36
7	Matteo Rizzo	Italy	229.55	8	78.75	7	150.80
8	Mihhail Selevko	Estonia	218.25	5	84.18	10	134.07
9	Andreas Nordebäck	Sweden	212.61	11	67.93	8	144.68
10	Deniss Vasiļjevs	Latvia	210.08	9	75.45	9	134.63
11	Jimmy Ma	United States	196.11	10	67.99	11	128.12
12	Valtter Virtanen	Finland	173.79	12	61.92	12	111.87

=== Women's singles ===
Mone Chiba of Japan, who had been in second place after the short program, placed first in the free skate and won the gold medal, securing her spot at the 2025 Grand Prix Final. "Reflecting back on today's performance, there were not so perfect jumps," Chiba stated afterward. "However the rest of the jumps I was able to complete clean... And I was able to deliver and convey emotions through the step sequence and choreographic sequence, so I'm happy." Amber Glenn of the United States, who had been in first place after the short program, finished in second place, despite landing her signature triple Axel, when she had errors with several of her following jumps. Rino Matsuike of Japan rallied back from a sixth-place finish in the short program to win the bronze medal. Loena Hendrickx of Belgium, who had struggled considerably in the short program, falling on two of her jumps and placing tenth, withdrew from the competition prior to the free skate for medical reasons.

Women's results
Rank	Skater	Nation	Total points	SP		FS	
1st place, gold medalist(s)	Mone Chiba	Japan	217.22	2	72.89	1	144.33
2nd place, silver medalist(s)	Amber Glenn	United States	213.41	1	75.72	2	137.69
3rd place, bronze medalist(s)	Rino Matsuike	Japan	193.21	6	61.26	3	131.95
4	Bradie Tennell	United States	190.38	4	63.92	4	126.46
5	Madeline Schizas	Canada	188.60	3	65.16	5	123.44
6	Iida Karhunen	Finland	180.17	9	60.03	6	120.14
7	Rion Sumiyoshi	Japan	178.26	5	61.42	7	116.48
8	Lorine Schild	France	175.63	8	60.74	8	114.89
9	Olivia Lisko	Finland	164.67	7	61.00	9	103.67
10	Selma Välitalo	Finland	142.47	11	43.84	10	98.63
WD	Loena Hendrickx	Belgium	Withdrew	10	54.75	Withdrew from competition	

=== Pairs ===
The top four pairs teams following the short program were separated by a margin of less than one point, making it the slimmest margin in the history of the Grand Prix of Figure Skating in any discipline. Minerva Fabienne Hase and Nikita Volodin of Germany emerged victorious, despite errors in both programs: a stumble on their death spiral in the short program and a fall on their triple Salchow in the free skate. Hase and Volodin earned a spot at the 2025 Grand Prix Final. Alisa Efimova and Misha Mitrofanov of the United States finished in second place, while Ellie Kam and Daniel O'Shea, also of the United States, finished in third place. "I'm very proud of how we skated today," Kam states. "It was definitely a step in the right direction. It wasn't as clean as at [the 2025 Skate Canada International] … but I think we've really taken the steps to improve our performance and we were able to do a good job with that here today."

Pairs' results
Rank	Team	Nation	Total points	SP		FS	
1st place, gold medalist(s)	Minerva Fabienne Hase; Nikita Volodin	Germany	206.88	1	70.40	1	136.48
2nd place, silver medalist(s)	Alisa Efimova; Misha Mitrofanov	United States	205.49	3	70.19	2	135.30
3rd place, bronze medalist(s)	Ellie Kam; Daniel O'Shea	United States	199.09	2	70.24	3	128.85
4	Yuna Nagaoka; Sumitada Moriguchi	Japan	193.12	5	67.53	4	125.59
5	Lia Pereira; Trennt Michaud	Canada	191.33	4	70.13	6	121.20
6	Zhang Jiaxuan; Huang Yihang	China	185.28	7	62.42	5	122.86
7	Rebecca Ghilardi; Filippo Ambrosini	Italy	167.88	6	62.49	7	105.39
8	Ioulia Chtchetinina; Michał Woźniak	Poland	155.59	8	56.55	8	99.04

=== Ice dance ===
Having previously won the 2025 Grand Prix de France, Laurence Fournier Beaudry and Guillaume Cizeron of France won their second Grand Prix event at the Finlandia Trophy, beating Piper Gilles and Paul Poirier of Canada by a margin of two points and guaranteeing their spot at the 2025 Grand Prix Final. "We're very pleased with our performances this weekend," Cizeron stated afterward. "We've been working a lot on the rhythm dance and I think it really showed yesterday, and the free dance keeps developing and maturing … we had so much fun today showing that." Cizeron had competed for years with Gabriella Papadakis, winning five World Championship titles and gold medals at the 2022 Winter Olympics before they ended their partnership in December 2024. Fournier Beaudry had competed for Canada with Nikolaj Sørensen before Sørensen received a suspension from competitive skating in October 2024. Fournier Beaudry and Cizeron announced their new partnership in March 2025 with a stated goal of competing at the 2026 Winter Olympics.

Gilles and Poirier also earned a spot at the 2025 Grand Prix Final with their second-place finish. Emilea Zingas and Vadym Kolesnik of the United States finished in third place and also earned a spot at the Grand Prix Final. "If someone would have told us we'll go to the Final at the beginning of the season, Olympic season, there's no way," Kolesnik stated.

Ice dance results
Rank	Team	Nation	Total points	RD		FD	
1st place, gold medalist(s)	Laurence Fournier Beaudry; Guillaume Cizeron	France	204.18	1	79.89	1	124.29
2nd place, silver medalist(s)	Piper Gilles; Paul Poirier	Canada	202.11	2	79.56	2	122.55
3rd place, bronze medalist(s)	Emilea Zingas; Vadym Kolesnik	United States	196.02	3	78.51	3	117.51
4	Olivia Smart; Tim Dieck	Spain	192.06	4	76.07	4	115.99
5	Maia Shibutani; Alex Shibutani	United States	185.68	5	71.99	6	113.69
6	Diana Davis; Gleb Smolkin	Georgia	184.13	7	70.42	5	113.71
7	Yuka Orihara; Juho Pirinen	Finland	176.77	8	69.39	7	107.38
8	Natálie Taschlerová; Filip Taschler	Czech Republic	172.95	6	71.65	10	101.30
9	Oona Brown; Gage Brown	United States	170.47	9	64.21	8	106.26
10	Phebe Bekker; James Hernandez	Great Britain	165.60	10	62.87	9	102.73

== Controversy ==
The International Skating Union announced on 27 November that they would conduct a review after receiving complaints about the ice dance event at the 2025 Finlandia Trophy. Athletes and coaches felt that the technical panel was unusually harsh, awarding level one designations (the lowest of four levels) on numerous teams' step sequences and flagging choreographic elements as insufficient to meet the requirements. Piper Gilles of Canada commented at a press conference after the rhythm dance: "It is really unfortunate the top athletes in the world are getting level ones on their pattern step [sequence]. We are all working really hard but we are made feel a bit like junior skaters." Guillaume Cizeron of France was more blunt: "I don’t think I’ve ever been to a competition like this in my career from a judging standpoint." Alex Shibutani of the United States was puzzled with the scores he and Maia received versus those they had received at the 2025 NHK Trophy: "At [the NHK Trophy], we received level three for our midline step [sequence] and we received higher levels on our footwork... and we felt today that we had worked really hard on them and improved them, and performed them... much stronger than NHK. But the levels were level one."

Under the ISU Judging System, the base value of each element in a skating performance is identified by the Technical Panel. This panel is responsible for identifying all of the elements performed as they happen in real time, as well as flagging technical errors and the levels of difficulty (on a scale from one to four) of each element performed. The technical panel includes three individuals: the Technical Controller and two Technical Specialists; the Technical Specialists call the elements as they happen. Shawn Rettstatt, the Technical Controller at both the 2025 Finlandia Trophy and the 2025 Skate America, was the focus of much of the controversy. Rettstatt was also chair of the ISU's Technical Committee for Ice Dance, which is responsible for establishing the rules for competitive ice dance. Some of the changes made during Renstatt's tenure have included the elimination of a required pattern dance in the rhythm dance for senior-level teams and the addition of more choreographic elements. While these changes were ostensibly intended to allow for increased creativity among teams, critics have argued that the elimination of a required pattern removed the "opportunity to directly compare teams on the basis of their technical skating", and could allow for more preferential scoring from the individual judges. Gilles summed up the controversy: "We are accountable for everything that we do out on the ice, but I don’t necessarily think that the judges and the technical panel are also accountable for what they do to the athletes. I think there needs to be an equal amount of respect between the two of us.

== Works cited ==
- "Special Regulations & Technical Rules – Single & Pair Skating and Ice Dance 2024" (PDF). International Skating Union. Archived (PDF) from the original on 3 June 2025.
