= Finlandia Trophy (Grand Prix of Figure Skating) =

International figure skating competition

Grand Prix of Finland
- Status: Active
- Genre: Grand Prix competition
- Frequency: Annual
- Country: Finland
- Inaugurated: 2018
- Previous event: 2026 Finlandia Trophy
- Next event: 2027 Finlandia Trophy
- Organizer: Skating Finland

The Grand Prix of Finland is an annual figure skating competition sanctioned by the International Skating Union (ISU). It is organized and hosted by Skating Finland, and part of the ISU Grand Prix Series. The first competition was held in 2018 in Helsinki as a replacement for the Cup of China. It returned in 2022 as a replacement for the Rostelecom Cup after Russia was banned from international figure skating competitions. The Grand Prix of Finland has been held under several names: the Grand Prix of Helsinki, the Grand Prix of Espoo, and the Finlandia Trophy. Medals are awarded in men's singles, women's singles, pair skating, and ice dance. Skaters earn points based on their results at the qualifying competitions each season, and the top skaters or teams in each discipline are invited to then compete at the Grand Prix of Figure Skating Final.

== History ==
Beginning with the 1995–96 season, the International Skating Union (ISU) launched the Champions Series – later renamed the Grand Prix Series – which, at its inception, consisted of five qualifying competitions and the Champions Series Final. This allowed skaters to perfect their programs earlier in the season, as well as compete against the same skaters whom they would later encounter at the World Championships. This series also provided the viewing public with additional televised skating, which was in high demand. Skaters earned points based on their results in their respective competitions and the top skaters or teams in each discipline were then invited to compete at the Champions Series Final.

The first edition of the Grand Prix of Finland was held in 2018 in Helsinki as a replacement event for the Cup of China – a long-time event in the Grand Prix series – after the Chinese Skating Association declined to host any international skating events in order to prepare its venues for the 2022 Winter Olympics. Yuzuru Hanyu of Japan won this inaugural men's event, while Alina Zagitova of Russia won the women's event. Natalia Zabiiako and Alexander Enbert of Russia won the pairs event, and Alexandra Stepanova and Ivan Bukin, also of Russia, won the ice dance event.

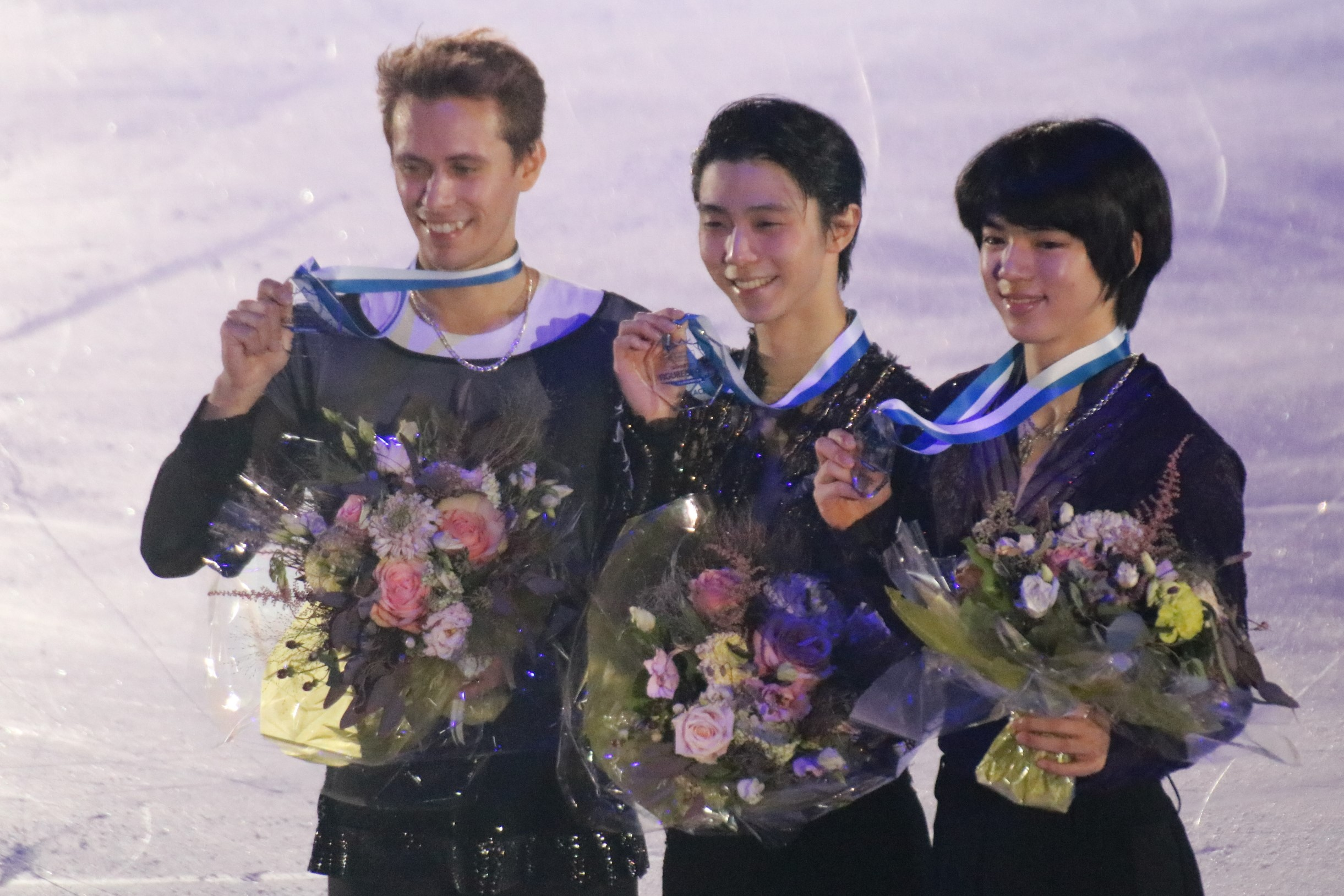
The gold, silver, and bronze medalists in the 2018 men's event: Yuzuru Hanyu of Japan (center), Michal Březina of the Czech Republic (left), and Cha Jun-hwan of South Korea (right)

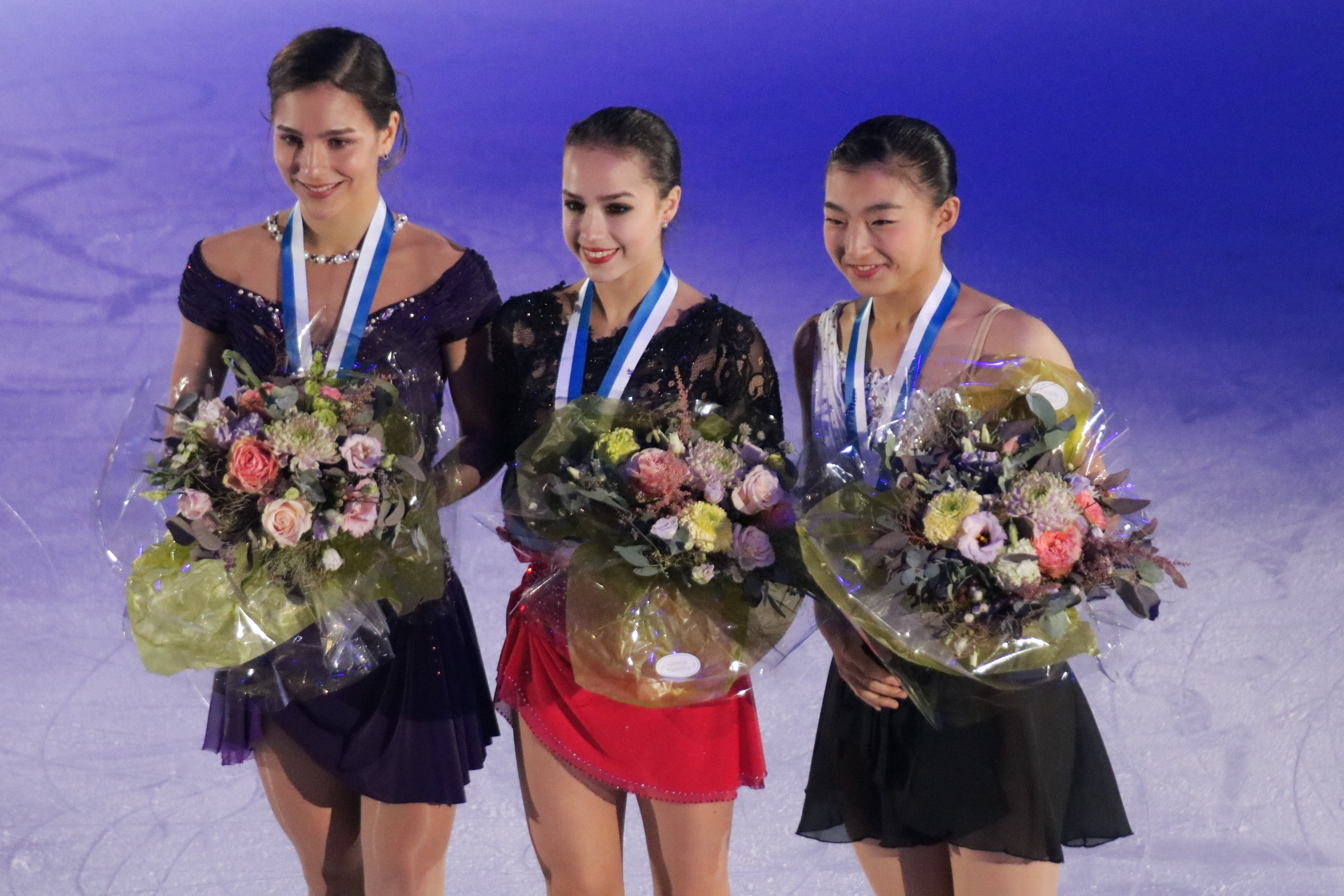
The gold, silver, and bronze medalists in the 2018 women's event: Alina Zagitova of Russia (center), Stanislava Konstantinova of Russia (left), and Kaori Sakamoto of Japan (right)

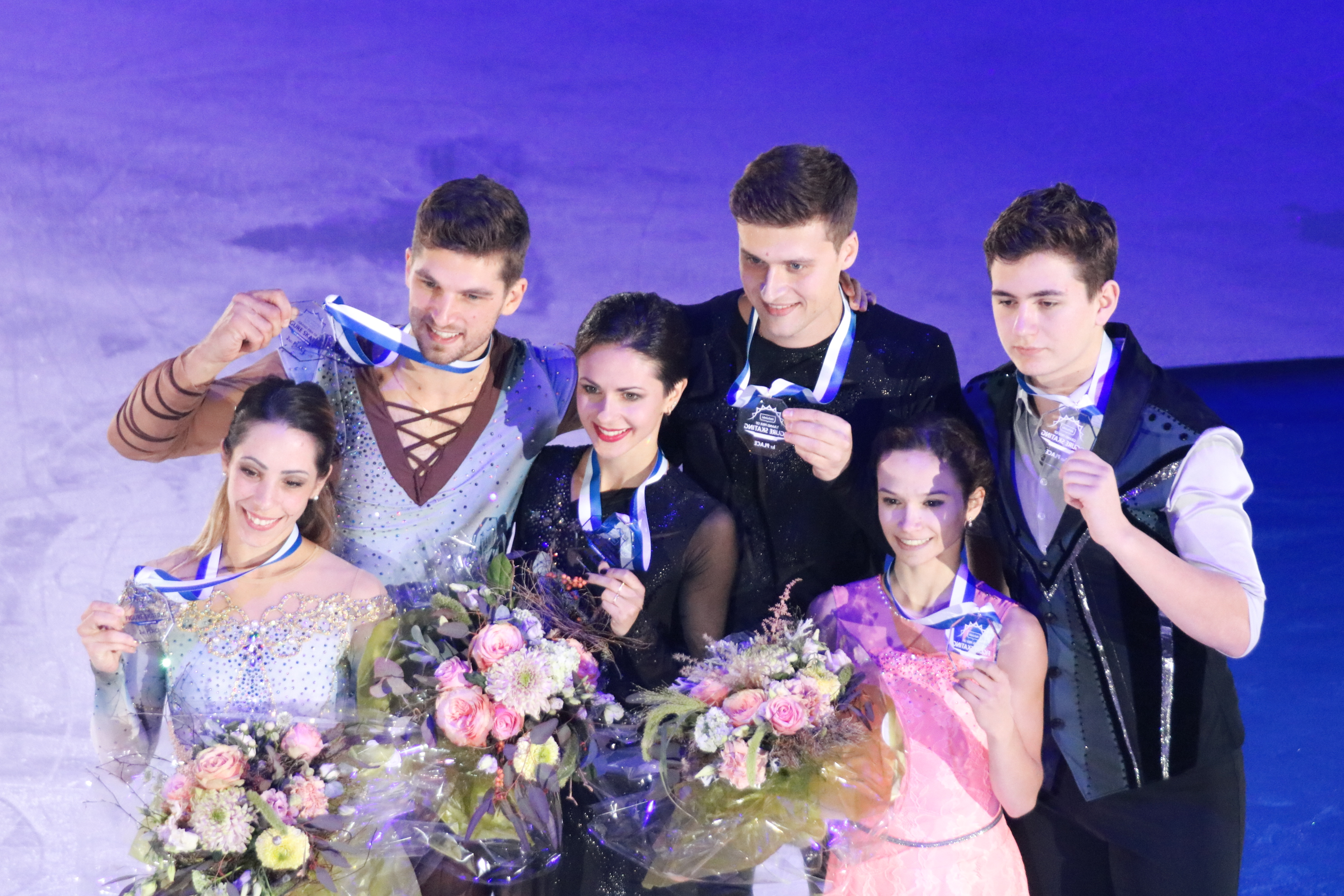
The gold, silver, and bronze medalists in the 2018 pairs event: Natalia Zabiiako and Alexander Enbert of Russia (center), Nicole Della Monica and Matteo Guarise of Italy (left), and Daria Pavliuchenko and Denis Khodykin of Russia (right)

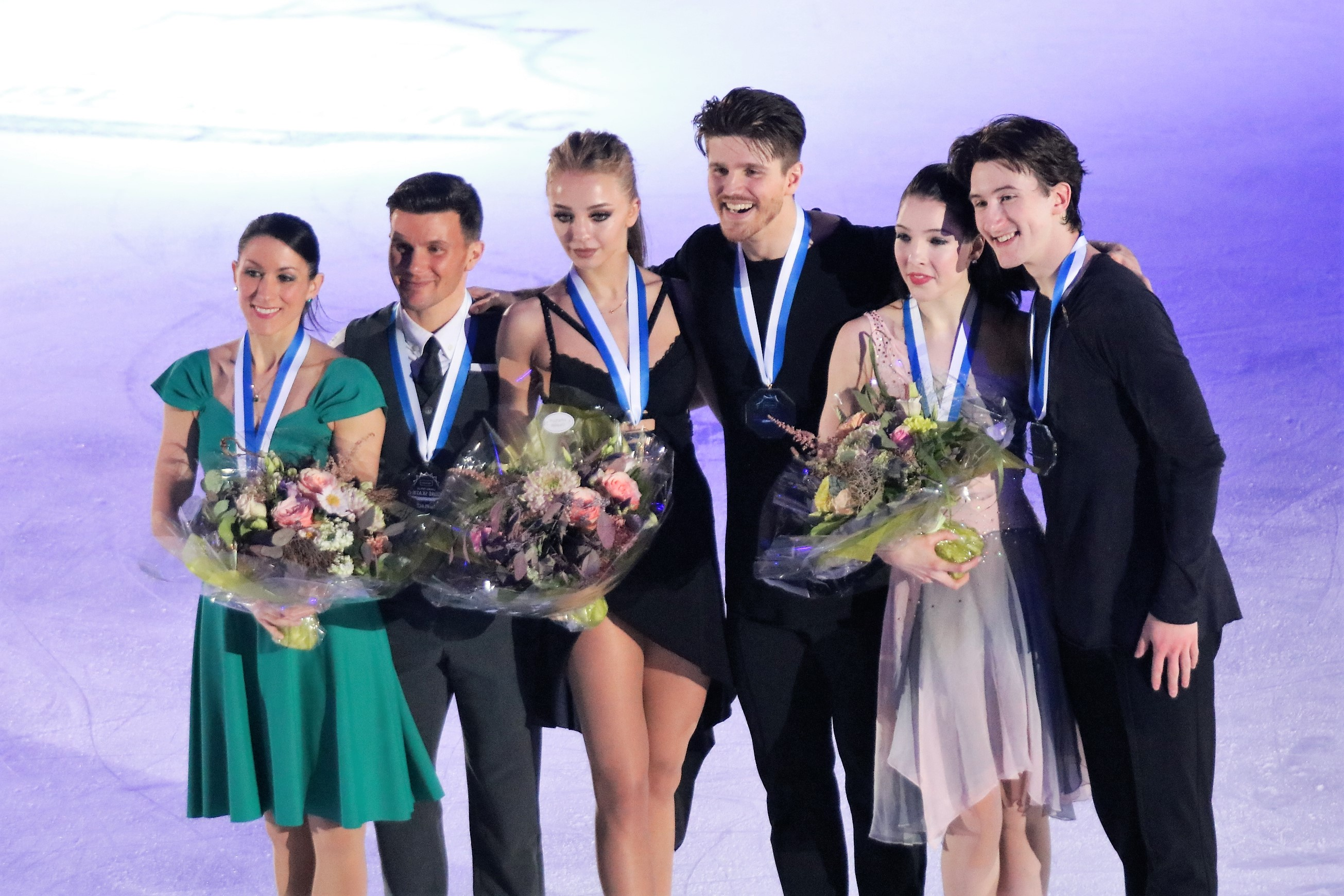
The gold, silver, and bronze medalists in the 2018 ice dance event: Alexandra Stepanova and Ivan Bukin of Russia (center), Charlène Guignard and Marco Fabbri of Italy (left), and Lorraine McNamara and Quinn Carpenter of the United States (right)

No competitions were held from 2019 to 2021 since the Grand Prix of Finland – at that point called the Grand Prix of Helsinki – had been a one-time substitute for the Cup of China. Following the 2022 Russian invasion of Ukraine, Russian and Belarusian athletes were banned from participating in international figure skating competitions. The ISU also ordered that no international competitions would be held in Russia or Belarus. Therefore, the Rostelecom Cup, which had been scheduled for that November, was cancelled. As such, the Grand Prix of Finland – now retitled the Grand Prix of Espoo – was staged to serve as a replacement. In 2024, the Grand Prix of Finland adopted the name Finlandia Trophy, which had previously been the name of Finland's Challenger Series event.

On 16 November 2026, in response to Russia's continued war in Ukraine, the government of Finland passed a resolution preventing citizens of Russia from traveling to Finland with short-term work visas unless the work was "essential to Finland's national interests". This included athletes from Russia competing under neutral status. "As long as Russia's war of aggression continues, Russian athletes have no business in Finland," said Elina Valtonen, Finland's Minister for Foreign Affairs. She also stated that Russia regularly uses "sports as a tool for propaganda". As such, Evgeni Semenenko (in men's singles), Anastasia Mishina and Aleksandr Galliamov, Aleksandra Boikova and Dmitrii Kozlovskii, and Ekaterina Chikmareva and Matvei Ianchenkov (all in pair skating) were removed from the list of entrants at the 2026 Finlandia Trophy.

== Medalists ==
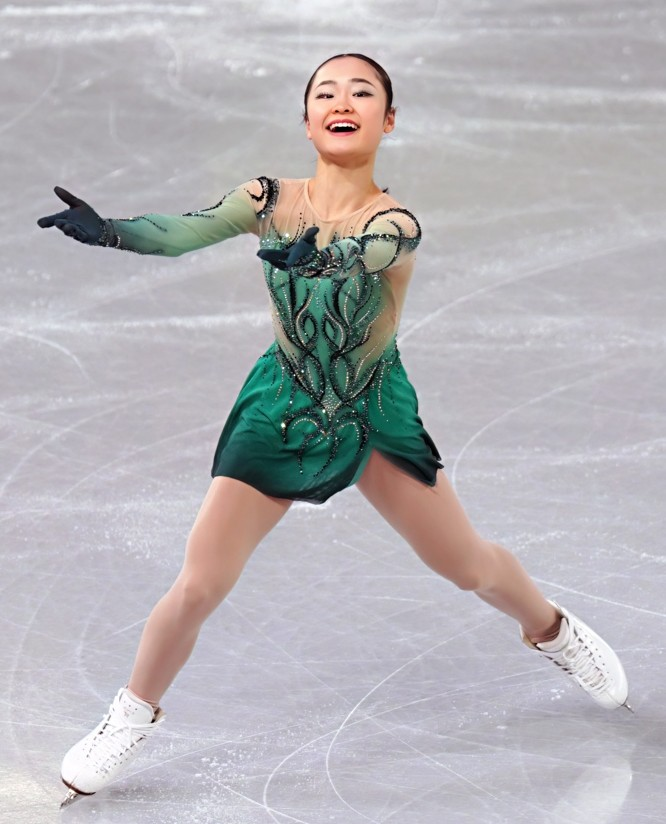
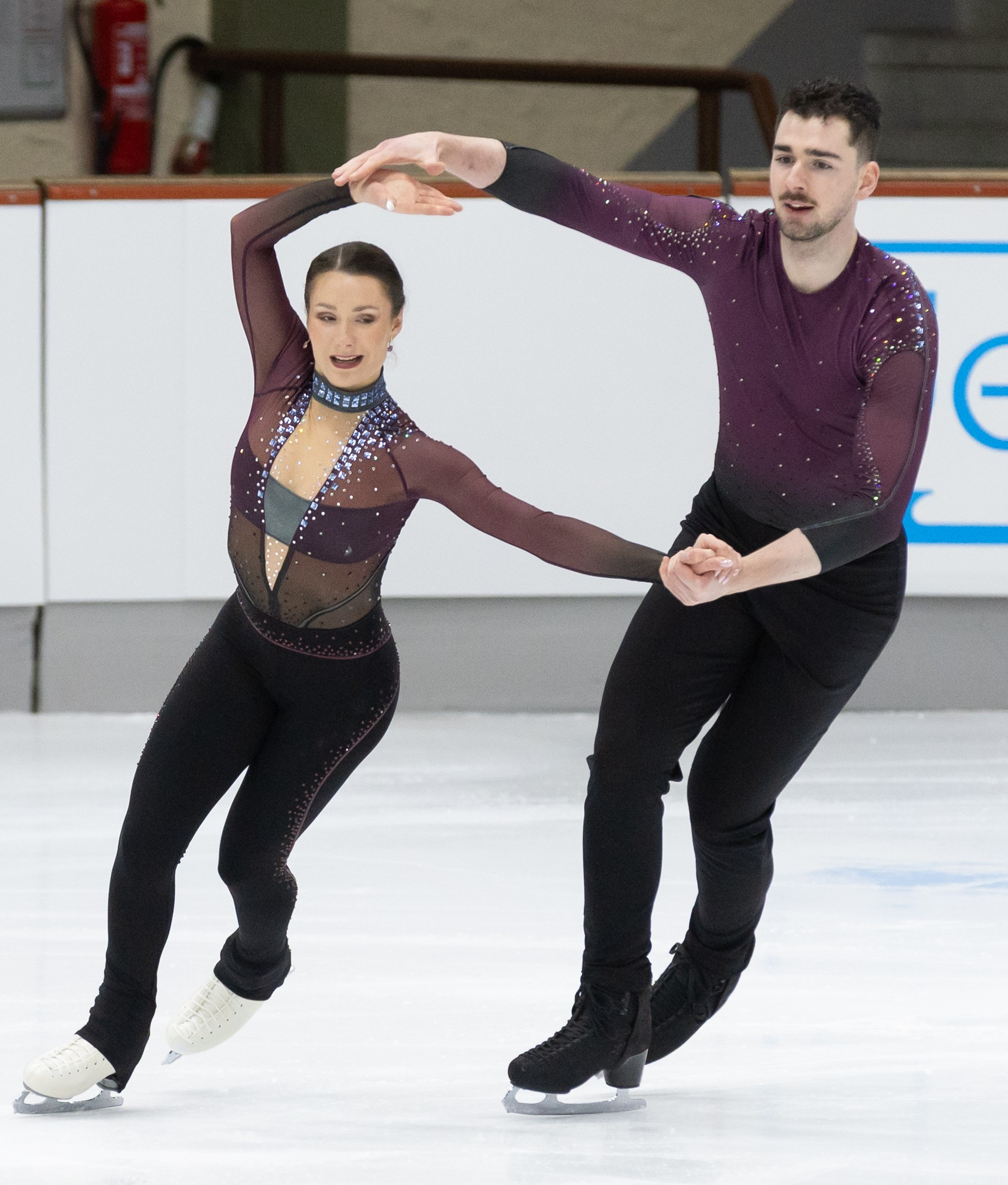
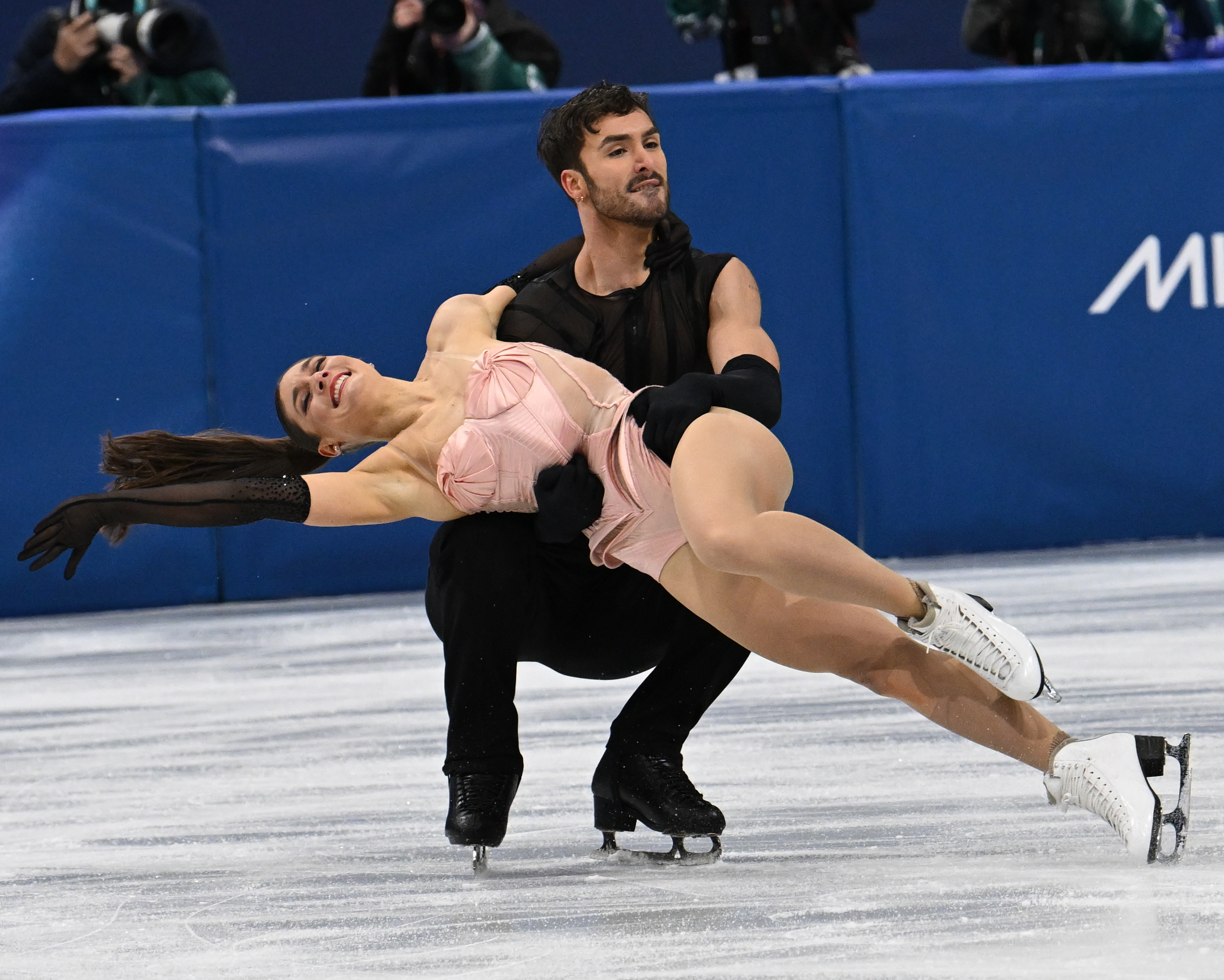
The reigning Grand Prix of Finland champions (from left to right): Mihhail Selevko of Estonia (men's singles); Mao Shimada of Japan (women's singles); Annika Hocke and Robert Kunkel of Germany (pair skating); and Laurence Fournier Beaudry and Guillaume Cizeron of France (ice dance)

=== Men's singles ===
Men's event medalists
Year	Location	Gold	Silver	Bronze	Ref.
2018	Helsinki	(Japan) Yuzuru Hanyu	(Czech Republic) Michal Březina	(South Korea) Cha Jun-hwan	
2019–21	No competitions held				
2022	Espoo	(United States) Ilia Malinin	(Japan) Shun Sato	(France) Kévin Aymoz	
2023	Espoo	(Japan) Kao Miura	(Japan) Shun Sato	(France) Kévin Aymoz	
2024	Helsinki	(Japan) Yuma Kagiyama	(France) Kévin Aymoz	(Italy) Daniel Grassl	
2025	Helsinki	(Japan) Yuma Kagiyama	(France) Adam Siao Him Fa	(Canada) Stephen Gogolev	
2026	Helsinki	(Estonia) Mihhail Selevko	(Sweden) Andreas Nordebäck	(Japan) Kazuki Tomono	

=== Women's singles ===
Women's event medalists
Year	Location	Gold	Silver	Bronze	Ref.
2018	Helsinki	(Russia) Alina Zagitova	(Russia) Stanislava Konstantinova	(Japan) Kaori Sakamoto	
2019–21	No competitions held				
2022	Espoo	(Japan) Mai Mihara	(Belgium) Loena Hendrickx	(Japan) Mana Kawabe	
2023	Espoo	(Japan) Kaori Sakamoto	(Japan) Rion Sumiyoshi	(United States) Amber Glenn	
2024	Helsinki	(Japan) Hana Yoshida	(Japan) Rino Matsuike	(Italy) Lara Naki Gutmann	
2025	Helsinki	(Japan) Mone Chiba	(United States) Amber Glenn	(Japan) Rino Matsuike	
2026	Helsinki	(Japan) Mao Shimada	(Estonia) Niina Petrõkina	(United States) Isabeau Levito	

=== Pairs ===
Pairs event medalists
Year	Location	Gold	Silver	Bronze	Ref.
2018	Helsinki	(Russia); Natalia Zabiiako; Alexander Enbert	(Italy); Nicole Della Monica; Matteo Guarise	(Russia); Daria Pavliuchenko; Denis Khodykin	
2019–21	No competitions held				
2022	Espoo	(Italy); Rebecca Ghilardi; Filippo Ambrosini	(Germany); Alisa Efimova; Ruben Blommaert	(Georgia (country)); Anastasia Metelkina; Daniil Parkman	
2023	Espoo	(Germany); Minerva Fabienne Hase; Nikita Volodin	(Italy); Sara Conti; Niccolò Macii	(Hungary); Maria Pavlova; Alexei Sviatchenko	
2024	Helsinki	(Canada); Deanna Stellato-Dudek; Maxime Deschamps	(Hungary); Maria Pavlova; Alexei Sviatchenko	(Italy); Rebecca Ghilardi; Filippo Ambrosini	
2025	Helsinki	(Germany); Minerva Fabienne Hase; Nikita Volodin	(United States); Alisa Efimova; Misha Mitrofanov	(United States); Ellie Kam; Daniel O'Shea	
2026	Helsinki	(Germany); Annika Hocke; Robert Kunkel	(Canada); Lia Pereira; Trennt Michaud	(United States); Audrey Shin; Spencer Akira Howe	

=== Ice dance ===
Ice dance event medalists
Year	Location	Gold	Silver	Bronze	Ref.
2018	Helsinki	(Russia); Alexandra Stepanova; Ivan Bukin	(Italy); Charlène Guignard; Marco Fabbri	(United States); Lorraine McNamara; Quinn Carpenter	
2019–21	No competitions held				
2022	Espoo	(Canada); Piper Gilles; Paul Poirier	(United States); Kaitlin Hawayek; Jean-Luc Baker	(Finland); Juulia Turkkila; Matthias Versluis	
2023	Espoo	(United States); Madison Chock; Evan Bates	(Canada); Laurence Fournier Beaudry; Nikolaj Sørensen	(Finland); Juulia Turkkila; Matthias Versluis	
2024	Helsinki	(United Kingdom); Lilah Fear; Lewis Gibson	(Canada); Piper Gilles; Paul Poirier	(Finland); Juulia Turkkila; Matthias Versluis	
2025	Helsinki	(France); Laurence Fournier Beaudry; Guillaume Cizeron	(Canada); Piper Gilles; Paul Poirier	(United States); Emilea Zingas; Vadym Kolesnik	
2026	Helsinki	(France); Laurence Fournier Beaudry; Guillaume Cizeron	(Finland); Juulia Turkkila; Matthias Versluis	(United States); Oona Brown; Gage Brown	

== Cumulative medal count ==
=== Men's singles ===
Total number of Grand Prix of Finland medals in men's singles by nation
Rank	Nation	Gold	Silver	Bronze	Total
1	Japan	4	2	1	7
2	Estonia	1	0	0	1
2	United States	1	0	0	1
4	France	0	2	2	4
5	Czech Republic	0	1	0	1
5	Sweden	0	1	0	1
7	Canada	0	0	1	1
7	Italy	0	0	1	1
7	South Korea	0	0	1	1
Totals (9 entries)		6	6	6	18

=== Women's singles ===
Total number of Grand Prix of Finland medals in women's singles by nation
Rank	Nation	Gold	Silver	Bronze	Total
1	Japan	5	2	3	10
2	Russia	1	1	0	2
3	United States	0	1	2	3
4	Belgium	0	1	0	1
4	Estonia	0	1	0	1
6	Italy	0	0	1	1
Totals (6 entries)		6	6	6	18

=== Pairs ===
Total number of Grand Prix of Finland medals in pairs by nation
Rank	Nation	Gold	Silver	Bronze	Total
1	Germany	3	1	0	4
2	Italy	1	2	1	4
3	Canada	1	1	0	2
4	Russia	1	0	1	2
5	United States	0	1	2	3
6	Hungary	0	1	1	2
7	Georgia	0	0	1	1
Totals (7 entries)		6	6	6	18

=== Ice dance ===
Total number of Grand Prix of Finland medals in ice dance by nation
Rank	Nation	Gold	Silver	Bronze	Total
1	France	2	0	0	2
2	Canada	1	3	0	4
3	United States	1	1	3	5
4	Great Britain	1	0	0	1
4	Russia	1	0	0	1
6	Finland	0	1	3	4
7	Italy	0	1	0	1
Totals (7 entries)		6	6	6	18

=== Total medals ===
Total number of Grand Prix of Finland medals by nation
Rank	Nation	Gold	Silver	Bronze	Total
1	Japan	9	4	4	17
2	Russia	3	1	1	5
3	Germany	3	1	0	4
4	Canada	2	4	1	7
5	United States	2	3	7	12
6	France	2	2	2	6
7	Italy	1	3	3	7
8	Estonia	1	1	0	2
9	Great Britain	1	0	0	1
10	Finland	0	1	3	4
11	Hungary	0	1	1	2
12	Belgium	0	1	0	1
12	Czech Republic	0	1	0	1
12	Sweden	0	1	0	1
15	Georgia	0	0	1	1
15	South Korea	0	0	1	1
Totals (16 entries)		24	24	24	72
