= Blackbeard (disambiguation) =

Blackbeard was a notorious English pirate.

Blackbeard may also refer to:

- Blackbeard: Terror at Sea, a BBC miniseries
- Blackbeard (miniseries), a Hallmark Channel miniseries of 2006
- Blackbeard the Pirate, a 1952 film by Raoul Walsh
- Blackbeard (musical), a musical by Rob Gardner
- Blackbeard (Pirates of the Caribbean), a character in Pirates of the Caribbean
- Blackbeard (horse), an Irish racehorse
- Blackbeard (Our Flag Means Death), a character in Our Flag Means Death
- Marshall D. Teach, a character in One Piece also referred to as Blackbeard

== See also ==
- Blackbeard's Castle, a National Historic Landmark in the U.S. Virgin Islands
- Blackbeard's Ghost, a 1968 film
- Blackbeard's Lost Treasure Train, a roller coaster at Six Flags Great Adventure
- Dennis Bovell or Blackbear, British-based reggae artist
- Bluebeard (disambiguation)
- Redbeard (disambiguation)
