= Redbeard =

Redbeard or Red Beard may refer to:

== People ==
- Frederick Barbarossa (Redbeard), another name for Frederick I, Holy Roman Emperor (1122–1190)
- Oruç Reis or Redbeard (Barbarossa) (1474–1518), Ottoman naval commander
- Hayreddin Barbarossa or Red Beard (1478–1546), privateer and Ottoman admiral
- Ragnar Redbeard, pseudonymous author of 1896 book Might is Right
- Redbeard, former DJ at Q102 in Dallas, Texas and host of In the Studio
- Honghuzi (lit. 'Red Beards'), Chinese robbers and bandits in the 19th and 20th century

== Other uses ==
- Red Beard (nuclear weapon), a British tactical nuclear weapon
- Red Beard, a 1965 Japanese film directed by Akira Kurosawa
- Redbeard (comics), a series of Belgian comic books
- Redbeard, a common epithet of Thor, a major god in Norse mythology
- Redbeard, the nickname for Victor Trevor, a childhood friend of Sherlock Holmes's, from the BBC television show Sherlock
- Redbeard (card game), the Swedish card game of Rödskägg
- Redbeard Inc., an American comics publisher

== See also ==
- Barbarossa (disambiguation)
- Bluebeard (disambiguation)
- Blackbeard (disambiguation)
