= Mary Ormond =

Supposed wife of Blackbeard (c. 1702 – c. 1759)

Mary Ormond (born c. 1702, died c. 1759) was supposedly the wife of the notorious English pirate Blackbeard.

== History ==
Tradition holds that she was notable for her marriage to Edward Teach, better known as Blackbeard. She was married by Royal Governor Charles Eden in Bath, North Carolina, at about the age of sixteen years. The wedding was attended by Tobias Knight, the Royal Secretary for North Carolina, who was Teach's neighbor. She was the daughter of William Ormond, a plantation owner from Bath in Somerset. Her ultimate fate is undocumented.

However, the only evidence naming "Mary Ormond" as his wife is a letter from a 20th century member of the Ormond family claiming the marriage to Blackbeard as a family tradition. No period sources including marriage certificates, wills, or other witness testimony list his wife's name.

Governor Hamilton of the Leeward Islands mentioned a rumor that Blackbeard had a wife and children in London, while the Captains of Lyme and Pearl, the two ships sent to apprehend him, both wrote that Blackbeard had supposedly married in North Carolina. None of them noted the theoretical wife's name.

Historian Kevin Duffus affirms that Blackbeard participated in some sort of marriage, noting that the marriage "may have been an amusing ruse or party hoax, or it may have indeed occurred between the pirate and an acquaintance of the family from his early days of residency," adding, "But her name was not Mary Ormond."

Records from Chowan and Perquimans counties show that John Thach (also spelled Thatch/Thache, born c. 1718) held land and appears in estate and deed records in the mid-18th century. He is recorded as selling 100 acres in Chowan County on 23 January 1758 and later as a landholder in Perquimans County; his estate was administered in Perquimans in 1779/1780. These county probate, deed and estate records are the principal archival sources used by genealogists to connect John Thach to the Thach/Teach family of the Albemarle region. While no single extant will online unequivocally states "John inherits from Edward Teach and Mary Ormond," the surviving deed and estate papers and published abstracts are the primary documentary evidence cited in local histories and genealogical research linking the families.
