= Beard, West Virginia =

Unincorporated community in West Virginia, United States

- Unincorporated community
- Location within West Virginia Location within the United States
- Coordinates: 38°04′36″N 80°13′38″W
- Country: United States
- State: West Virginia
- County: Pocahontas
- Elevation: 2,008 ft (612 m)
- Time zone: UTC-5 (Eastern (EST))
  - Summer (DST): UTC-4 (EDT)
- ZIP code: 24921
- Area codes: 304 & 681
- GNIS feature ID: 1550200

Beard is an unincorporated community in Pocahontas County, West Virginia, United States. Beard is located on the Greenbrier River, 4 miles (6.4 km) south-southwest of Hillsboro.

The community was named after Josiah Beard, the proprietor of a local mill.
