= Beard Cabin =

Historic house in Oklahoma, United States

- U.S. National Register of Historic Places
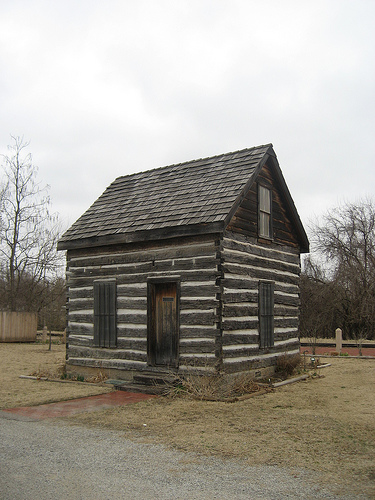
- Beard Cabin in March 2008

- Location within Oklahoma Location within the United States
- Location: 614 E. Main St. Shawnee, Oklahoma
- Coordinates: 35°19′43″N 96°54′59″W
- Area: less than one acre
- Built: 1892
- NRHP reference No.: 83002121
- Added to NRHP: April 8, 1983

The Beard Cabin is a historic cabin listed on the National Register of Historic Places and located in Shawnee, Oklahoma. Built in 1892, it is considered to be the first home built in Shawnee.

The cabin was built by Etta Ray and her father, P.H. Ray. Assisting were Etta's future brother-in-law, John Beard as well as John's sister, Lola Beard. Etta later married Henry Beard and they were the first inhabitants. Sleeping quarters are located on the upper floor of the cabin. The home is furnished and may be toured by making arrangements at the Santa Fe Depot Museum.

In 1999, the cabin was restored and moved to its present location, near the Santa Fe Depot on Main Street, after being damaged in a windstorm at Woodland Park in Shawnee. The Cleo Craig Foundation provided the funds for the relocation.
