= Skating Finland =

National association for figure skating in Finland

- Suomen Taitoluisteluliitto
- Sport: Figure skating
- Founded: 1960
- Affiliation: International Skating Union
- Affiliation date: 1960
- Headquarters: Helsinki
- President: Susanna Rahkamo

Official website
- stll.fi
- (Finland)

Skating Finland, formerly known as the Finnish Figure Skating Association (FFSA) (Finnish: Suomen Taitoluisteluliitto, STLL) is the national association for figure skating in Finland.

The FFS has its origins in the Finnish Skating Association (Suomen Luisteluliitto) which was formed in 1908 as an umbrella association for both figure and speed skaters. In 1960, Suomen Kaunoluisteluliitto (Finnish Beauty Skating Association) was formed for figure skating disciplines and it changed its name in 1968 to the present to reflect the change in terminology – figure skating (taitoluistelu) was formerly known in Finnish as kaunoluistelu.

Skating Finland is a member federation of the International Skating Union. The association's headquarters are currently in Helsinki.

== See also ==
- Finnish Figure Skating Championships
- Finnish Synchronized Skating Championships
