= Rob Gardner (composer) =

American composer

- Born: 1977 (age 48–49); Mesa, Arizona
- Education: Brigham Young University; University of Southern California
- Occupation: Composer

Rob Gardner (born 1977) is an American composer known for his oratorios. One of his most widely performed works is his oratorio Lamb of God, about the death and resurrection of Jesus Christ. It was recorded by the London Symphony Orchestra at Air Studios in London in June 2010.

Gardner was born and raised in Mesa, Arizona in a Latter-day Saint family. He served a mission for the Church of Jesus Christ of Latter-day Saints in the Bordeaux France mission. He graduated from Brigham Young University with a Bachelor of Science in business management and later did graduate study in the University of Southern California's "Scoring for Motion Pictures and Television" program.

Among the oratorios by Gardner are He is Jesus Christ, Joseph Smith the Prophet, Saints and Pioneers and Lamb of God. He composed and conducted the production of the YouTube video Manger of Bethlehem. He also has composed the musicals, Blackbeard, The Price of Freedom (with McKane Davis), and 12 Princesses.

Gardner is also a co-founder and president of the nonprofit organization Spire Music. He also helped co-found the group Cinematic Pop, with Drex and McKane Davis.

== Sources ==
- Deseret News, Dec. 13, 2012 article on Gardner
- Mormon Artist interview with Gardner
- San Francisco Classical Voice article on Lamb of God performance
- Mlive article on Lamb of God
- New Musical Theatre article on Gardner
- Arizona Republic article on Gardner's work
