= Battle of Ocracoke =

Final defeat of the pirate Blackbeard

Coordinates: 35.100°N 75.994°W

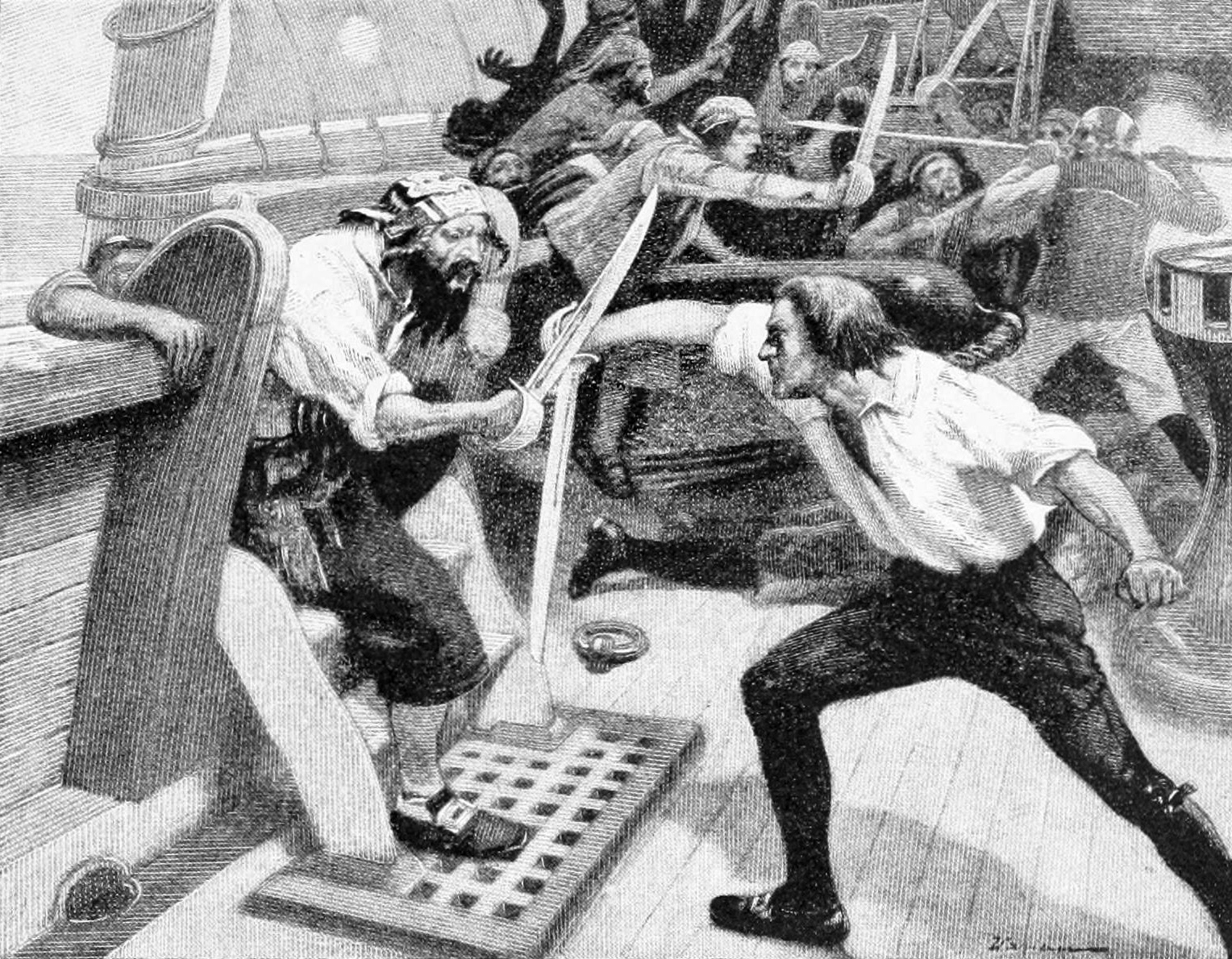
- Blackbeard Boarding Maynard's Ships by George Edmund Varian (1904)
Date	22 November (N.S. 3 December) 1718
Location	Ocracoke Inlet, Province of North Carolina
Result	British victory

Belligerents
Kingdom of Great Britain	Pirates

Commanders and leaders
Robert Maynard; Edmund Hyde †	Blackbeard †

Units involved
Detachments from HMS Pearl and HMS Lyme	Blackbeard's crew

Strength
2 civilian sloops	1 civilian sloop

Casualties and losses
11–20 killed	10–12 killed

The Battle of Ocracoke, also known as the Battle at Ocracoke or the Battle of Ocracoke Inlet, was a naval engagement fought on 22 November (N.S. 3 December) 1718 in Ocracoke Inlet, then part of the Province of North Carolina. It resulted in the death of the pirate Blackbeard (Edward Teach) and the defeat of his crew by a force commanded by Royal Navy lieutenant Robert Maynard.

== Background ==
Blackbeard had been operating along the coast of the Thirteen Colonies and had recently received a pardon from the governor of North Carolina, Charles Eden. Complaints about Blackbeard's activities nevertheless continued, and Virginia governor Alexander Spotswood decided to send an expedition against him. Spotswood ordered captains George Gordon and Brand of HMS Pearl and HMS Lyme to travel overland to Bath, while Lieutenant Robert Maynard of Pearl was given command of two commandeered civilian sloops to approach the town by sea.

Maynard took command of the two armed sloops on 17 November. He was given 57 men—33 from Pearl and 24 from Lyme. Maynard and the detachment from Pearl took the larger of the two vessels and named her Jane, while the remainder took Ranger, commanded by one of Maynard's officers, Edmund Hyde. Some members of the two ships' civilian crews remained aboard.

Spotswood's action was undertaken without the formal authority of North Carolina's government. He was concerned that Blackbeard posed a continuing threat to commerce and that the pirate's presence in North Carolina could threaten Virginia's interests. Spotswood may also have been motivated by political considerations, although the precise extent of this motivation is disputed.

The two sloops sailed from Kecoughtan along the James River on 17 November. They moved slowly, giving Brand's force time to reach Bath. Maynard's expedition reached Ocracoke Inlet on 21 November, where Blackbeard's sloop, the Adventure, was found at anchor. Maynard decided to wait until morning before attacking.

== Battle ==
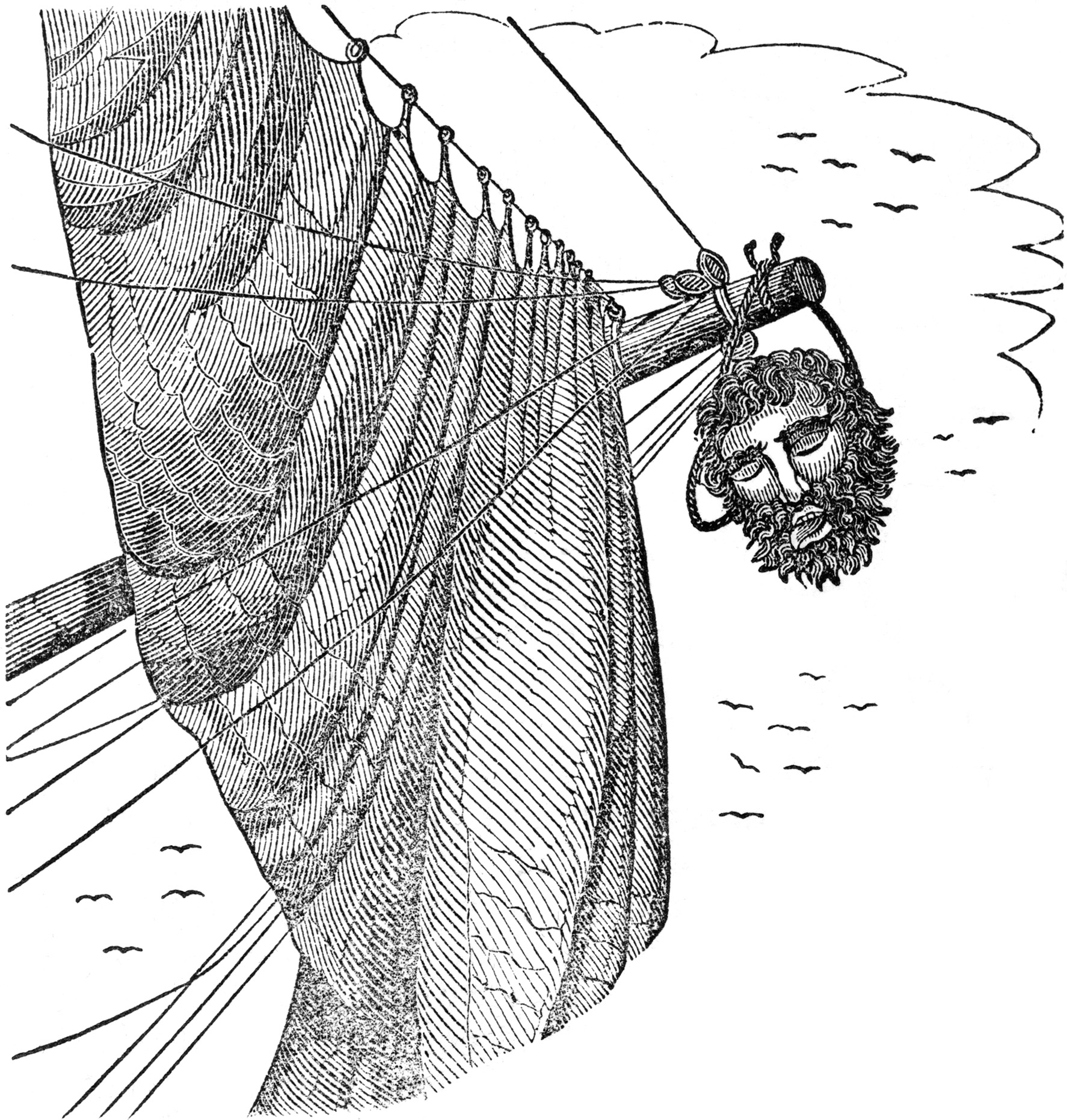
Blackbeard's severed head hangs from Maynard's bowsprit, as pictured in Charles Elles's The Pirates Own Book (1837)

At dawn on 22 November, Maynard moved the Jane and Ranger into Ocracoke Inlet. The shallow, shifting waters made navigation difficult. Blackbeard opened fire as Maynard's vessels approached, and his broadside inflicted heavy casualties. Midshipman Edmund Hyde, commander of the Ranger, was killed, and the sloop was so badly damaged that it took no further part in the attack.

The precise sequence of the vessels' movements is uncertain in the surviving accounts. Some accounts state that the Jane and Ranger ran aground, while another version has the Adventure becoming grounded. Maynard nevertheless succeeded in bringing the Jane close enough to the Adventure for Blackbeard to attempt to board it.

Maynard had kept many of his men below deck, and Blackbeard and his men interpreted the small number of men visible on deck as evidence that Maynard's force had suffered severe casualties. When Blackbeard and his crew boarded the Jane, Maynard's hidden men emerged and attacked them at close quarters.

Blackbeard and Maynard fought directly during the boarding action. According to accounts of the battle, Maynard shot Blackbeard, while Blackbeard continued fighting despite suffering numerous wounds. Blackbeard received five gunshot wounds and twenty stab wounds before succumbing to his injuries. Blackbeard was ultimately killed and beheaded. His head was suspended from the bowsprit of Maynard's vessel and his body was thrown overboard.

The battle ended with Blackbeard's death and the surrender of the surviving pirates. Twelve of Blackbeard's men were killed, eight of them during the boarding action, while the remainder surrendered. The Adventure was taken by Maynard's force.

A later legend held that Blackbeard's headless body swam around the vessel three times before disappearing beneath the water.

== Aftermath ==
Maynard remained at Ocracoke for several days, making repairs and burying the dead. Blackbeard's remaining property was sold at auction, with the proceeds used in part to pay the costs of the expedition. The prize money for capturing Blackbeard was divided between the crews of HMS Lyme and HMS Pearl.

== In popular culture ==
The Battle of Ocracoke and Blackbeard's death have been depicted in numerous works of popular culture, including the 1987 novel On Stranger Tides by Tim Powers, the 2006 television special Blackbeard: Terror at Sea, and the 2013 video game Assassin's Creed IV: Black Flag.

The battle also appears in the 2021 Netflix limited series The Lost Pirate Kingdom. The 2011 film Pirates of the Caribbean: On Stranger Tides references the traditional account of Blackbeard's death, including the story that his headless body swam around his ship three times before disappearing.

== Commemoration ==
The site where Blackbeard and Maynard were traditionally believed to have fought has become associated with the name Teach's Hole. The battle has also been commemorated through reenactments and other events on Ocracoke Island, including the Blackbeard Pirate Jamboree. In 2017, officials of the jamboree held a memorial service for the participants of the battle at the Ocracoke Community Center.
