= Posthumous execution =

Ceremonial mutilation of a corpse as punishment

Posthumous execution is the ritual or ceremonial mutilation of an already dead body as a punishment.

== Dissection as a punishment in England ==
Some Christians believed that the resurrection of the dead on Judgment Day requires that the body be buried whole facing east so that the body could rise facing God. If dismemberment stopped the possibility of the resurrection of an intact body, then a posthumous execution was an effective way of punishing a criminal.

In England Henry VIII granted the annual right to the bodies of four hanged felons. Charles II later increased this to six ... Dissection was now a recognised punishment, a fate worse than death to be added to hanging for the worst offenders. The dissections performed on hanged felons were public: indeed part of the punishment was the delivery from hangman to surgeons at the gallows following public execution, and later public exhibition of the open body itself ... In 1752 an act was passed allowing dissection of all murderers as an alternative to hanging in chains. This was a grisly fate, the tarred body being suspended in a cage until it fell to pieces. The object of this and dissection was to deny a grave ... Dissection was described as "a further terror and peculiar Mark of Infamy" and "in no case whatsoever shall the body of any murderer be suffered to be buried". The rescue, or attempted rescue of the corpse was punishable by transportation for seven years.

— Dr D. R. Johnson, Introductory Anatomy.

== Examples ==
- When the Persian king Cambyses conquered Egypt in 525 BC and ended the 26th (Saite) Dynasty, Herodotus recorded the desecration of the mummy of Amasis II (who died the year before) by Cambyses:

No sooner did [Cambyses] enter the palace of Amasis that he gave orders for his [Amasis's] body to be taken from the tomb where it lay. This done, he proceeded to have it treated with every possible indignity, such as beating it with whips, sticking it with goads, and plucking its hairs... As the body had been embalmed and would not fall to pieces under the blows, Cambyses had it burned.

- In 897, Pope Stephen VI had the corpse of Pope Formosus disinterred and put on trial during the Cadaver Synod. Found guilty, the corpse had three of its fingers cut off and was later thrown into the Tiber.
- Harold I Harefoot, king of the Anglo-Saxons (1035–1040), illegitimate son of Cnut, died in 1040 and his half-brother, Harthacanute, on succeeding him, had his body taken from its tomb and cast in a pen with animals.
- Simon de Montfort, 6th Earl of Leicester, died of wounds suffered at the Battle of Evesham in 1265; his corpse was beheaded, castrated and quartered by the knights of Henry III of England.
- Roger d'Amory (c. 1290 – before 14 March 1321/1322) died following the Battle of Burton Bridge and was then posthumously executed for treason by Edward II.
- John Wycliffe (1328–1384) was burned as a heretic forty-five years after his death.
- Sir Henry Percy (d. 1404) after he was killed in action while leading his troops at the Battle of Shrewsbury, King Henry IV of England ordered Percy's body posthumously beheaded, quartered, and attainted for high treason
- Vlad the Impaler (1431–1476) was beheaded following his assassination.
- Jacopo Bonfadio (1508–1550) was beheaded for sodomy and then his corpse was burned at the stake for heresy.
- Nils Dacke, leader of a 16th-century peasant revolt in southern Sweden, was decapitated and dismembered after his death in combat.
- In 1538, during the Dissolution of the Monasteries on orders from King Henry VIII. He had the bones of Thomas Becket (1119–1170) destroyed, his shrine destroyed, and ordered all mention of his name obliterated.
- By order of Mary I, the body of Martin Bucer (1491–1551) was exhumed and burned at the Market Square in Cambridge, England.
- In 1600, after the failure of the Gowrie conspiracy, the corpses of John, Earl of Gowrie and his brother Alexander Ruthven were hanged and quartered at the Mercat Cross, Edinburgh. Their heads were put on spikes at Edinburgh's Old Tolbooth and their limbs upon spikes at various locations around Perth, Scotland.

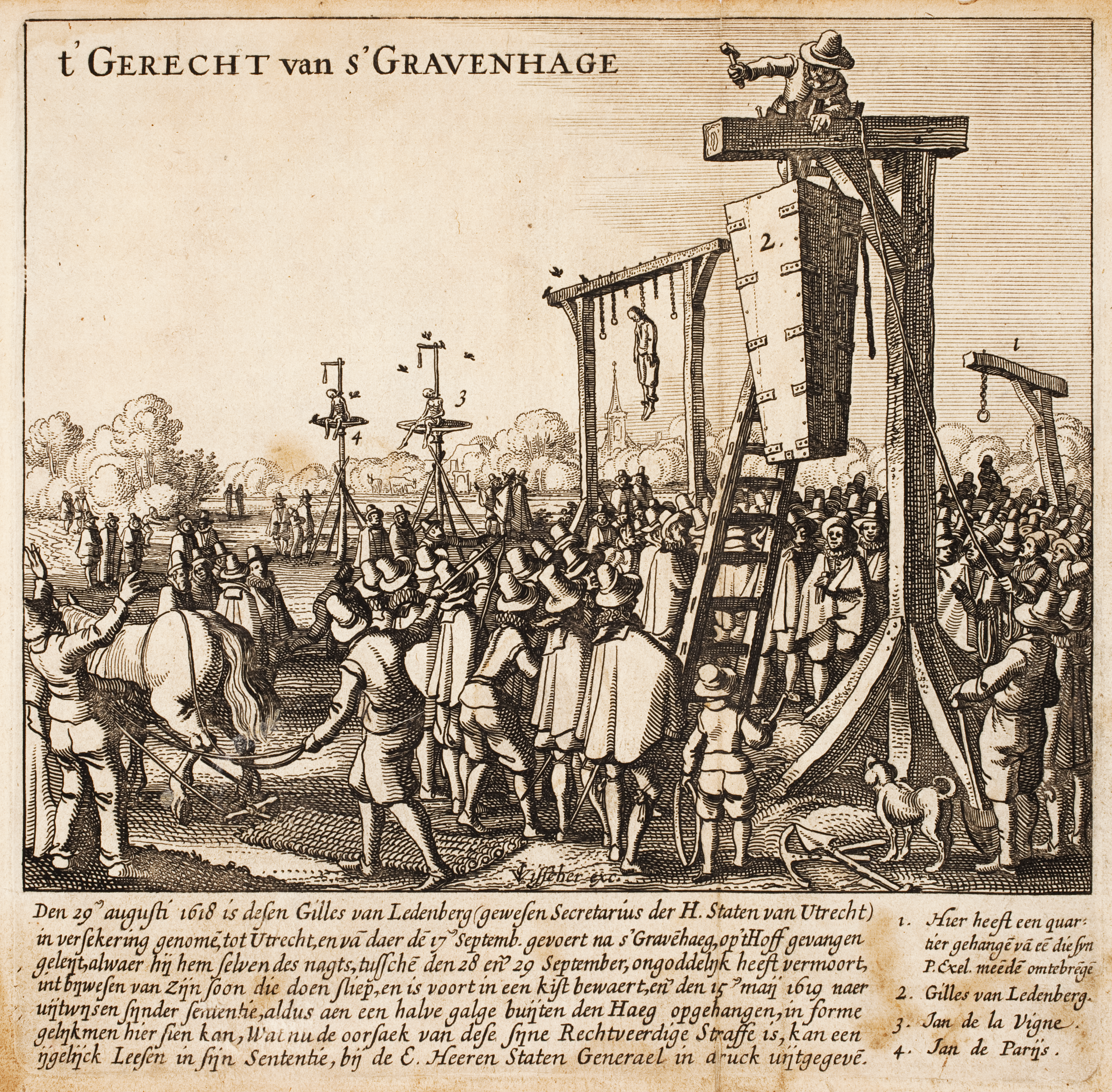
The posthumous hanging of Gilles van Ledenberg in 1619

- Gilles van Ledenberg, whose embalmed corpse was hanged from a gibbet in 1619, after his conviction of treason in the trial of Johan van Oldenbarnevelt.
- A number of the 59 regicides of Charles I of England, including the most prominent of the regicides, the former Lord Protector Oliver Cromwell, died before the Restoration of his son Charles II in 1660. Parliament passed an order of attainder for High Treason on the four most prominent deceased regicides: John Bradshaw the court president; Oliver Cromwell; Henry Ireton; and Thomas Pride. The bodies were exhumed and three were hanged for a day at Tyburn and then beheaded. The three bodies were then thrown into a pit close to the gallows, while the heads were placed, with Bradshaw's in the middle, at the end of Westminster Hall (the symbolism was lost on no one as that was the building where the trial of Charles I had taken place). Oliver Cromwell's head was finally buried in 1960. The body of Pride was not "punished", perhaps because it had decayed too much.
- Edward Teach (1680–1718), better known as "Blackbeard", was killed by the sailors of HMS Pearl who boarded on his ship, the Adventure. British First Lieutenant Robert Maynard examined Edward Teach's body, decapitated and tied his head to the bowsprit of his ship for the trip back to Virginia. Upon returning to his home port of Hampton, the head was placed on a stake near the mouth of the Hampton River as a warning to other pirates.
- Joseph Warren (1741–1775), an American physician who was killed at the Battle of Bunker Hill. Benjamin Hichborn, a Boston lawyer who had joined the Continental Army, wrote a letter to John Adams on December 10, 1775 noting he heard he heard a rumor from "two gentlemen" who claimed that Lieutenant James Drew, the commander of the sloop-of-war HMS Scorpion, went to the battlefield "a day or two" after the battle and exhumed Warren's corpse, "spit in his face, jumped on his stomach, and at last cut off his head and committed every act of violence upon his body... In justice to the officers in general I must add, that they despised Drew for his Conduct."
- In 1793, following the death sentence of 22 Girondin leaders, Charles Éléonor Dufriche-Valazé committed suicide, but his corpse was still guillotined along with his 21 fellows.
- In 1917, the body of Rasputin, the Russian mystic, was exhumed from the ground by a mob and burned.
- In 1918, the secret grave of Lavr Kornilov, the White Russian general, was found by the Bolsheviks by accident. The body was then exhumed and disfigured before being burned.
- In 1966, during the Cultural Revolution, Red Guards stormed the Ding Mausoleum, destroyed thousands of artifacts, and dragged the remains of the Wanli Emperor and his two empresses to the front of the tomb where they were posthumously denounced and burned after photographs were taken of their skulls.
- The body of General Gracia Jacques, a supporter of François Duvalier ("Papa Doc") (1907–1971), the Haitian dictator, was exhumed and ritually beaten to "death" in 1986.

== See also ==
Blowing from a gun
