= Lieutenant Richards (pirate) =

Pirate

- Occupation: Pirate
- Years active: 1718
- Known for: Sailing alongside Blackbeard
- Piratical career
- Rank: Lieutenant
- Base of operations: Caribbean and off the Carolinas
- Commands: Revenge

Lieutenant Richards (fl. 1718, first name unknown, possibly Thomas) was a pirate active in the Caribbean and off the Carolinas. He is best known for sailing alongside Blackbeard (Edward Teach / Thatch).

== History ==
Richards was part of Edward Teach's crew while they sailed with Benjamin Hornigold and later aboard the Queen Anne's Revenge. Near the Carolinas in early 1717 Teach met up with pirate Stede Bonnet in his 10-gun 60-ton sloop Revenge. Bonnet was a wealthy landowner from Barbados who knew little of seafaring or piracy; at Teach's suggestion (and the request of Bonnet's disgruntled crew) Bonnet came aboard Teach's ship while Teach captained the Revenge. After capturing the 200-ton Concorde and renaming it Queen Anne's Revenge, Teach placed Richards in command of Bonnet's Revenge.

Around Turneffe Teach's fleet was resupplying when they encountered the 8-gun, 80-ton Jamaican logwood hauler Adventure under captain David Herriot. Richards hoisted a black flag and sailed to meet the Adventure, capturing it. Herriott and his crew joined the pirates and Teach placed Israel Hands aboard the Adventure as captain.

Near the Bay of Honduras they captured several sloops and a large ship called Protestant Caesar. Richards and the Revenge secured the sloops, keeping one as a tender. Teach ordered one sloop and the Protestant Caesar burned because they were from Boston, which Teach had a grudge against after several pirates had been tried and hung there. Afterwards they pirated in the Grand Caymans, off Havana, and near the Bahamas, before finally heading to Charles Town.

There in May 1718 they took several more ships, keeping the crews and ships prisoner. Teach sent Richards and a few others into town with an ultimatum: deliver a chest of medicine or the prisoners would be killed and all the ships burned. Richards and the pirates spend their time drinking and carousing while a prisoner delivered their demands. The town council agreed and sent the medicines to Teach, who looted the ships but released them and the prisoners. Leaving Charles Town, Richards was berated by Teach for failing to burn a ship from Boston.

Teach took his fleet north, where the Queen Anne’s Revenge and another sloop were beached and wrecked at Topsail Inlet. Teach took the fleet's treasure and a small crew and fled in Herriot's Adventure, leaving his former crew and the others stranded. Bonnet soon returned after having sought a pardon; retaking his sloop Revenge, he rescued the others and attempted to chase down Teach but settled for looting other ships instead.

Lieutenant Richards’ fate is not recorded. Charles Town merchants, weary of pirate attacks by Teach, Charles Vane, and others, equipped two ships under William Rhett as pirate hunters. Rhett missed Vane but fought and captured Bonnet. Records of Stede Bonnet's trial list all the pirates captured alive by Rhett, and Richards was not among them. Teach was caught and killed near Ocracoke by naval officer Robert Maynard, who apprehended many of his crew. Richards was not among the pirates captured by Maynard either.

Richards’ first name is not known. In depositions given at Stede Bonnet's trial, two different ship captains testified that they had been approached by boats, and hailing them to ask their names, were told “Thomas Richards” before the boat crews announced that they were pirates. “Thomas” may have been Lieutenant Richards’ real name, or an alias, or may have been another of Teach's crew entirely; in official documents he is referred to only as “Richards.”

== In popular culture ==
- Richards, going by Thomas, is the first boss in the video game Windrose.

== See also ==
- Admiralty court, in which Bonnet's and Teach's captured crews were tried.
