= Beaufort Inlet =

Beaufort Inlet may refer to:

- Beaufort Inlet (Western Australia), an inlet located in the Great Southern region of Western Australia
- Beaufort Inlet (North Carolina), an inlet located in the Outer Banks of North Carolina, USA
