= Blackbeard: Terror at Sea =

2005 BBC mini-series by Richard Dale

Blackbeard DVD (BBC cover)

Blackbeard: Terror at Sea, a television special by the BBC, starring James Purefoy as Blackbeard. It aired in the United States on 12 March 2006 on National Geographic and was released on DVD in the Netherlands in July 2006, by Just Entertainment.

== Plot ==
The story, told in retrospect by Israel Hands, a former friend and companion of Blackbeard, begins in June 1717, in the Bahamas. It is the aftermath of the War of the Spanish Succession. After peace has been made, many former privateers in British service are no longer required and are sent on their way, with many of them turning to piracy.

Israel Hands serves as ship's master on a sloop captained by Charles Vane. During landfall at the pirate haven of Nassau, New Providence, Hands meets Edward Teach, and joins his crew.

Meanwhile, in Virginia, one of the richest British colonies in the Americas, governor Alexander Spotswood is incensed by the economic damage caused by piracy. Captain Brand, a Royal Navy officer stationed in Virginia, introduces the recently transferred Lieutenant Robert Maynard to the governor, but is berated for not being able to capture any pirates, as Spotswood wants the navy to hunt them down, instead of just providing protection.

At sea, Teach and his crew come across a French sloop and decide to give chase. They catch up to the ship, but their attempts to intimidate its crew into surrender fail, and the pirates have to board. In a short but bloody skirmish, the pirates battle their opponents into submission. Teach is frustrated by the bloodshed, which yielded them a mere fifty sacks of sugar. He dreams of larger prizes and being remembered for more than just for being a petty criminal. They trade the sugar to Charles Eden, the governor of North Carolina. Unlike Virginia, it is a poorer colony with few goods and ships, and can't be choosy about trading partners.

Later, the pirates encounter the "La Concorde", a French slave ship under captain Dosset, on its way to Martinique. While Hands explains that slave ships are usually well crewed and armed and that pirates wouldn't normally attack ships of that size, the ambitious Teach nevertheless decides to give chase. They come alongside and this time, the intimidation tactic works and the French strike their flag without a fight.

Teach takes the "La Concorde" as his new ship and gives his own sloop to Dosset, so that he and his men can continue on their way. This is supposed to spread a message to future victims, that if you surrender without a fight, you will live. Louis Arot, who sailed on the "La Concorde" as cabin boy and is actually a teenage girl in disguise, joins the pirate crew and becomes well liked by Hands and Morton (Blackbeards chief gunner), but has to keep his real identity a secret.

Some months later, after taking several more prizes, they spot a large ship, which Hands identifies as the "Great Allen", a merchant vessel from Boston. Teach is angered upon hearing this, as he recollects the story of Captain Bellamy's pirate crew, some of them were picked up by a ship from Boston after being shipwrecked. Instead of being rescued however, they were tried for piracy and a few of them were hanged, at which Teach takes insult. He orders to attack the ship and retreats to his cabin. There he dons a hat with burning cannon fuses, six loaded pistols and two cutlasses. The legend of Blackbeard has finally taken its full form. After boarding the "Great Allen", the pirates strap her captain to the mast, humiliate and flog him.

Governor Spotswood in Virginia is infuriated as he hears of the incident, and even more so when he learns that King George I will issue a pardon to any pirate who surrenders himself, fuming that the pirates are "rewarded" with this pardon for their many criminal activities.

After the attack on the "Great Allen", where some of the pirates were wounded and others are ill with yellow fever, they need medicine. In order to get it, they blockade the port of Charleston, South Carolina, extorting money from any ship that heads in our out of the port. They also stop the "Crowley" and discover Samuel Wragg on board, a government official carrying 1500 pounds. He, his son and other passengers are taken hostage and Teach sends two pirates ashore to gather medicine in exchange for their release. A few days later, they return with the medicine and the pirates leave the port.

Blackbeard surprisingly decides to accept the pardon from Governor Eden. For a while he settles down in North Carolina and marries Mary Ormond, a young lady from a wealthy local family. However, he soon tires of life on land, while his crew becomes unruly due to his absence and boredom, whereupon they return to sea and piracy.

Events take a turn for the worse, as Spotswood and Maynard devise a plan to catch Blackbeard and the quartermaster Howard is caught and interrogated by Spotswood. Under torture, he reveals the location of Blackbeards ship, and Maynard is sent out with two sloops to engage the pirates.

As many of their comrades have either taken the pardon or are hunted down, Blackbeard realises that their time is running out and their story will soon be coming to an end. He shoots Hands in the leg, whereupon he is forced to stay on land, which later saves his life.

At Ocracoke Inlet, Maynards ships encounter Blackbeards lone sloop. The navy vessels lack cannons, so Blackbeard is tempted into a boarding action. Many of Maynards men remained below deck for cover, and upon his sign they storm on deck to engage the pirates in a fierce melee. Blackbeard approaches Maynard, who shoots him with his pistol, but this fails to stop him. He disarms Maynard and knocks him down, but as he is about to kill him, he is stabbed and killed by one of Maynards men from behind.

The tale comes to an end with Hands recounting the fates of the surviving pirates, Governor Eden, Louis Arot, Governor Spotswood, Maynard and at last, himself - he took the pardon and returned to London, continuing to tell Blackbeards story.

== Cast ==
James Purefoy as Edward Teach (Blackbeard), the notorious pirate captain.

Mark Noble as Israel Hands, friend and companion of Blackbeard and the narrator of the story.

James Hiller as Mr. Gibbens, Blackbeard's right-hand man.

Jimmy Akingbola as Black Caesar, a former African slave who was freed by Blackbeard and is now loyal to him.

Robert Ricards as Mr. Howard, allegedly a Lord before going to sea, now Blackbeard's quartermaster.

James Marchant as Philip Morton, Blackbeard's chief gunner.

Simon Kunz as Alexander Spotswood, governor of Virginia.

Rupert Wickham as Captain Brand, a captain in the Royal Navy, stationed in Virginia.

Roger Barclay as Lieutenant Robert Maynard, Royal Navy, also stationed in Virginia.

Peter Pacey as Charles Eden, governor of North Carolina.

Brendan Hooper as Tobias Knight, confidant of Charles Eden.

Michael Mueller as Edward Moseley, an opponent of Charles Eden.

Manuel Cauchi as Captain Dosset, the French captain of the "La Concorde".

Antonia Campbell as Louis Arot, a French teenage girl in disguise, cabin boy on the "La Concorde" and later member of Blackbeard's crew.

Marc Spiteri as Captain Taylor, commanding the "Great Allen" from Boston.

John Hug as Samuel Wragg, a council member taken hostage by Blackbeard.

Sally Bretton as Mary Ormond, Blackbeard's wife during his stay in North Carolina.
