= Blackbeard =

English pirate (c. 1680–1718)

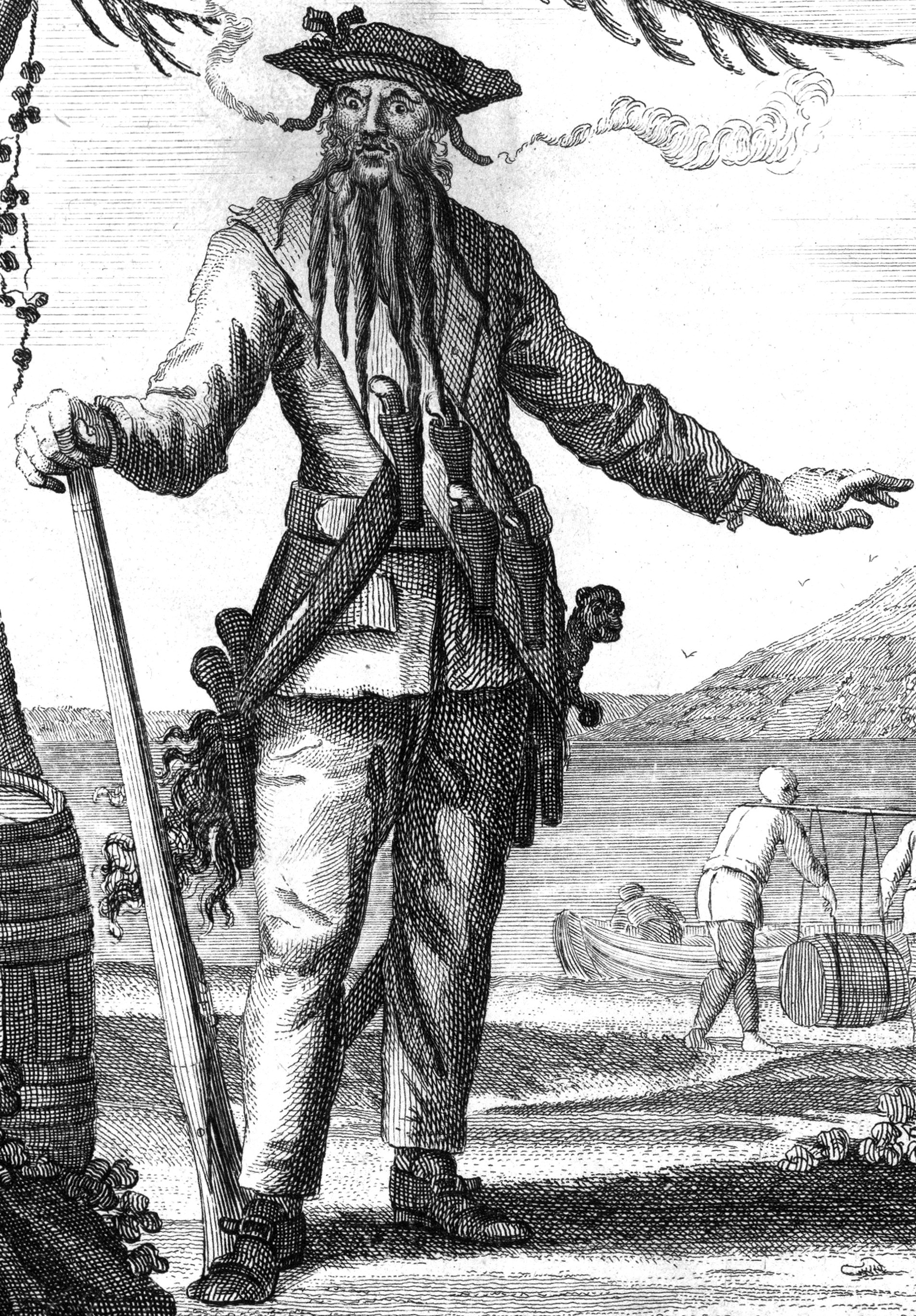
- c. 1736 portrait
- Born: Edward Teach c. 1680; Possibly Bristol, England
- Died: 22 November [3 December N.S.] 1718 (aged 35–40); Ocracoke Inlet, North Carolina
- Cause of death: Killed in action (stab wounds and gunshot wounds)
- Piratical career
- Nickname: Blackbeard
- Years active: 1716–1718
- Rank: Captain
- Base of operations: Atlantic; West Indies
- Commands: Queen Anne's Revenge; Adventure
- Battles: Battle of Ocracoke †

Edward Teach (or Thatch; c. 1680 – 22 November [3 December N.S.] 1718), better known as Blackbeard, was an English pirate who operated around the West Indies and the eastern coast of Britain's North American colonies. He remains one of history's most well-known pirates.

Little is known about Blackbeard's early life, but he may have been a sailor on privateering ships during Queen Anne's War before he settled on the Bahamian island of New Providence, a base for Captain Benjamin Hornigold, whose crew Teach joined around 1716. Hornigold placed him in command of a sloop that he had captured, and the two engaged in numerous acts of piracy. Their numbers were boosted by the addition to their fleet of two more ships, one of which was commanded by Stede Bonnet, but Hornigold retired from piracy toward the end of 1717, taking two vessels with him.

Teach captured a French slave ship known as La Concorde, renamed her Queen Anne's Revenge, equipped her with 40 guns, and crewed her with over 300 men. His nickname derived from his thick black beard and menacing appearance. He was reported to have tied lit fuses (slow matches) under his hat to frighten his enemies. He formed an alliance of pirates and blockaded the port of Charles Town, South Carolina, ransoming its inhabitants. He then ran Queen Anne's Revenge aground on a sandbar near Beaufort, North Carolina. He parted company with Stede Bonnet and settled in Bath, North Carolina, historically known as Bath Town, where he accepted a royal pardon. However, he was soon back at sea, where he attracted the attention of Alexander Spotswood, the governor of Virginia. Spotswood arranged for a party of soldiers and sailors to capture him. On 22 November [3 December N.S.] 1718, following the battle at Ocracoke Inlet, Teach and several of his crew were killed by a small force of sailors led by Lieutenant Robert Maynard. His flagship Queen Anne's Revenge was discovered by divers in November 1996 in Beaufort Inlet off the coast of North Carolina.

Teach was a shrewd and calculating leader who spurned the use of violence, relying instead on his fearsome image to elicit the response that he desired from those whom he robbed. He was romanticised after his death and became the inspiration for an archetypal pirate in works of fiction across many genres.

== Early life ==
Little is known about Blackbeard's early life. It is commonly believed that at the time of his death he was between 35 and 40 years old and thus born around 1680. In contemporary records his name is most often given as Blackbeard, Edward Thatch or Edward Teach. The latter is most often used because it is the form used in the dispatches of North America's only newspaper at the time, The Boston News-Letter, but primary sources written by people who had actually met the pirate all refer to him as "Thatch" or variations thereof. Several spellings of his surname exist: Thatch, Thach, Thache, Thack, Tack, Thatche, and Theach. One source claims that his surname was Drummond, but the lack of any supporting documentation makes this unlikely. Pirates habitually used fictitious surnames while engaged in piracy so as not to tarnish the family name, which makes it unlikely that Teach's real name will ever be known.

The 17th-century rise of Britain's American colonies and the rapid 18th-century expansion of the Atlantic slave trade had made Bristol an important international seaport, and Teach was most likely raised in what was then the second-largest city in England. He could almost certainly read and write. He communicated with merchants and, upon his death, had in his possession a letter addressed to him by the Chief Justice and Secretary of the Province of Carolina, Tobias Knight. Author Robert Lee speculated that Teach may therefore have been born into a respectable, wealthy family. He may have arrived in the Caribbean in the last years of the 17th century, on a merchant vessel (possibly a slave ship). The 18th-century author Charles Johnson claimed that Teach was for some time a sailor operating from Jamaica on privateer ships during the War of the Spanish Succession, and that "he had often distinguished himself for his uncommon boldness and personal courage." It is unknown at what point during the war Teach joined the fighting.

== Life as a pirate ==
=== New Providence ===
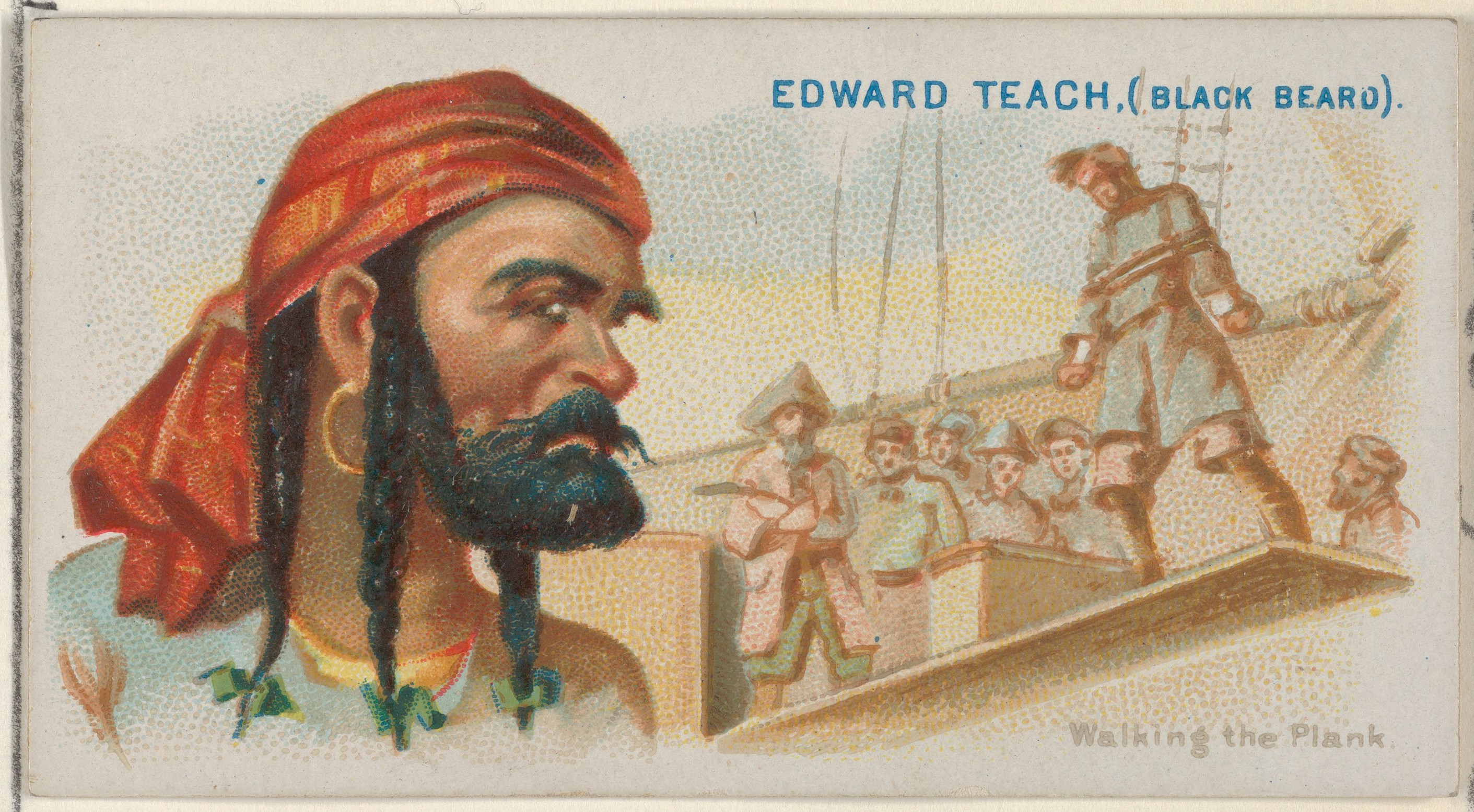
Edward Teach (Black Beard), Walking the plank, from the "Pirates of the Spanish" series (N19), cigarette card by Allen & Ginter

With its history of colonialism, trade and piracy, the West Indies was the setting for many 17th- and 18th-century maritime incidents. The privateer-turned-pirate Henry Jennings and his followers decided, early in the 18th century, to use the uninhabited island of New Providence as a base for their operations since it was within easy reach of the Florida Strait and its busy shipping lanes, which were filled with European vessels crossing the Atlantic. New Providence's harbour could easily accommodate hundreds of ships but was too shallow for the Royal Navy's larger vessels. The author George Woodbury described New Providence as "no city of homes. It was a place of temporary sojourn and refreshment for a literally floating population," continuing, "The only permanent residents were the piratical camp followers, the traders, and the hangers-on. All others were transient." In New Providence, pirates found a welcome respite from the law.

Teach was one of those who came to enjoy the island's benefits. Probably shortly after the signing of the Treaty of Utrecht, he moved there from Jamaica, and, along with most privateers once involved in the war, became involved in piracy. Possibly about 1716, he joined the crew of Captain Benjamin Hornigold, a renowned pirate who operated from New Providence's safe waters. In 1716, Hornigold placed Teach in charge of a sloop he had taken as a prize. In early 1717, Hornigold and Teach, each captaining a sloop, set out for the mainland. They captured a boat carrying 120 barrels of flour out of Havana, and shortly thereafter took 100 barrels of wine from a sloop out of Bermuda. A few days later they stopped a vessel sailing from Madeira to Charles Town, South Carolina. Teach and his quartermaster, William Howard, may at this time have struggled to control their crews. By then they had probably developed a taste for Madeira wine, and on 29 September near Cape Charles, all they took from the Betty of Virginia was her cargo of Madeira before they scuttled her with the remaining cargo.

It was during this cruise with Hornigold that the earliest known report of Teach was made, in which he is recorded as a pirate in his own right, in command of a large crew. In a report made by a Captain Mathew Munthe on an anti-piracy patrol for North Carolina, "Thatch" was described as operating "a sloop 6 gunns and about 70 men." In September, Teach and Hornigold encountered Stede Bonnet, a landowner and military officer from a wealthy family who had turned to piracy earlier that year. Bonnet's crew of about 70 were reportedly dissatisfied with his command, so with Bonnet's permission, Teach took control of his ship, Revenge. The pirates' flotilla now consisted of three ships: Teach on Revenge, Teach's old sloop, and Hornigold's Ranger. By October, another vessel had been captured and added to the small fleet. The sloops Robert of Philadelphia and Good Intent of Dublin were stopped on 22 October 1717 and their cargo holds emptied.

As a former British privateer, Hornigold attacked only his old enemies, but for his crew, the sight of British vessels filled with valuable cargo passing by unharmed became too much, and at some point toward the end of 1717 he was demoted. Whether Teach had any involvement in this decision is unknown, but Hornigold quickly retired from piracy. He took Ranger and one of the sloops, leaving Teach with Revenge and the remaining sloop. The two never met again and, as did many other occupants of New Providence, Hornigold accepted the King's pardon.

=== Blackbeard ===
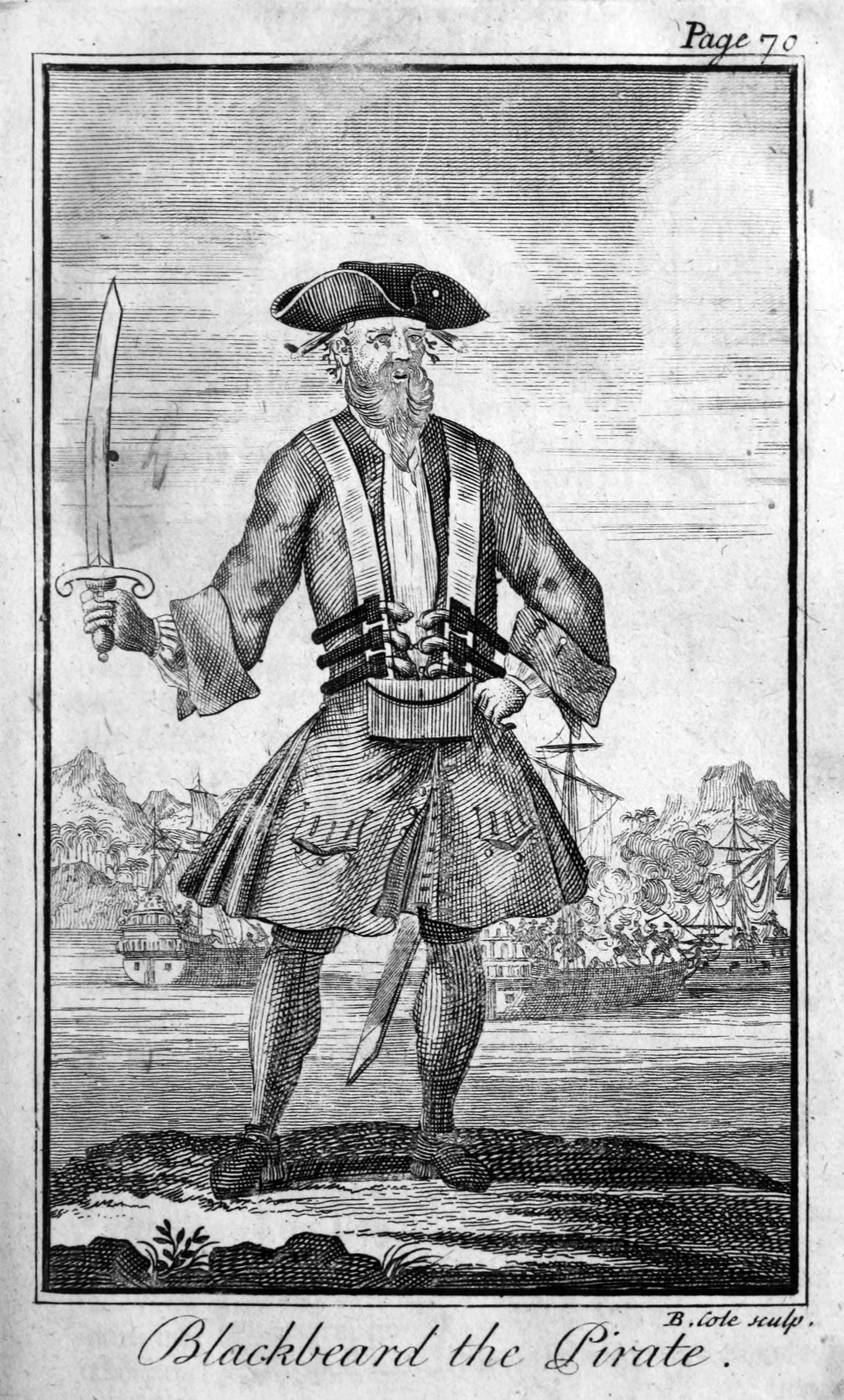
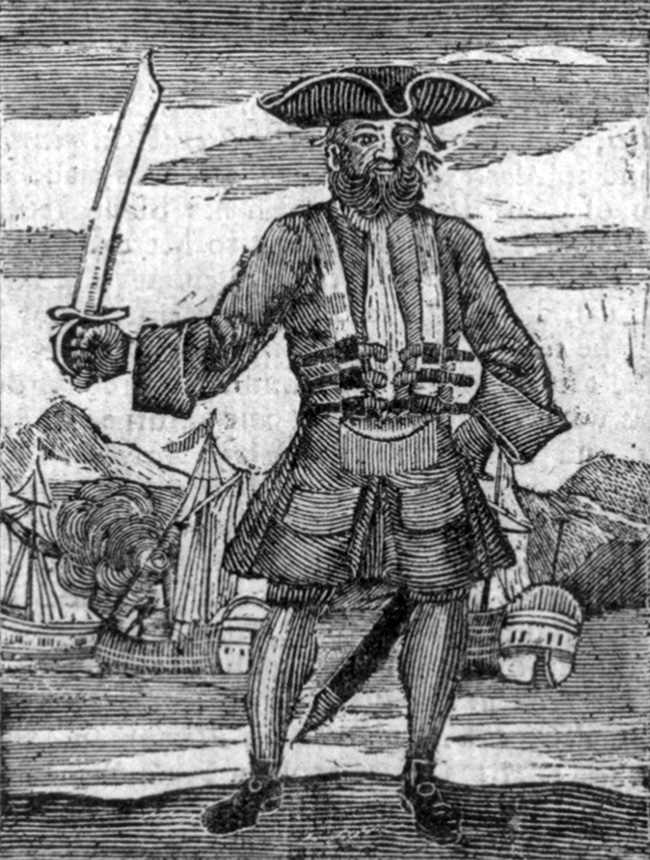
Blackbeard, as pictured within Charles Johnson's A General History of the Pyrates. The first image is a 1724 depiction by Benjamin Cole, the second is from 1725.

On 28 November 1717 Teach's two ships attacked a French merchant vessel off the coast of Saint Vincent. They each fired a broadside across its bulwarks, killing several of its crew, and forcing its captain to surrender. The ship was La Concorde, a large French Guineaman registered in Saint-Malo and carrying a cargo of slaves. This ship had originally been the English merchantman Concord, captured in 1711 by a French squadron, and then changed hands several times by 1717. Teach and his crews sailed the vessel south along Saint Vincent and the Grenadines to Bequia, where they disembarked her crew and captive cargo, and converted the ship for their own use. The crew of La Concorde were given the smaller of Teach's two sloops, which they renamed Mauvaise Rencontre ("Bad Meeting"), and sailed for Martinique. Teach may have recruited some of their slaves, but the remainder were left on the island and were later recaptured by the returning crew of Mauvaise Rencontre.

Teach immediately renamed La Concorde as Queen Anne's Revenge and equipped her with 40 guns. By this time Teach had placed his lieutenant Richards in command of Bonnet's Revenge. In late November the same year, near Saint Vincent, he attacked the Great Allen. After a lengthy engagement, he forced the large and well-armed merchant ship to surrender. He ordered her to move closer to the shore, disembarked her crew and emptied her cargo holds, and then burned and sank the vessel. The incident was chronicled in the Boston News-Letter, which called Teach the commander of a "French ship of 32 Guns, a Briganteen of 10 guns and a Sloop of 12 guns." It is not known when or where Teach collected the ten-gun briganteen, but by that time he may have been in command of at least 150 men split among three vessels.

On 5 December 1717 Teach stopped the merchant sloop Margaret off the coast of Crab Island, near Anguilla. Her captain, Henry Bostock, and crew, remained Teach's prisoners for about eight hours, and were forced to watch as their sloop was ransacked. Bostock, who had been held aboard Queen Anne's Revenge, was returned unharmed to Margaret and was allowed to leave with his crew. He returned to his base of operations on Saint Christopher Island and reported the matter to Governor Walter Hamilton, who requested that he sign an affidavit about the encounter. Bostock's deposition details Teach's command of two vessels: a sloop and a large French guineaman, Dutch-built, with 36 cannons and a crew of 300 men. The captain believed that the larger ship carried valuable gold dust, silver plate, and "a very fine cup" supposedly taken from the commander of Great Allen. (Note: Konstam (2007) considers this unlikely and that the pirates were almost certainly "teasing the captive with tall stories.") Teach's crew had apparently informed Bostock that they had destroyed several other vessels, and that they intended to sail to Hispaniola and lie in wait for an expected Spanish armada, supposedly laden with money to pay the garrisons. Bostock also claimed that Teach had questioned him about the movements of local ships, (Note: Among these other ships, Bostock reported that Teach was intent on finding a Captain Pinkentham and asked about him repeatedly. Teach never found Pinkentham, who had instead been caught by a pirate named Grinnaway.) but also that he had seemed unsurprised when Bostock told him of an expected royal pardon from London for all pirates.

So our Heroe, Captain Teach, assumed the Cognomen of Black-beard, from that large Quantity of Hair, which, like a frightful Meteor, covered his whole Face, and frightened America more than any Comet that has appeared there a long Time. This Beard was black, which he suffered to grow of an extravagant Length; as to Breadth, it came up to his Eyes; he was accustomed to twist it with Ribbons, in small Tails, after the Manner of our Ramilies Wiggs, and turn them about his Ears.

— Charles Johnson

Bostock's deposition describes Teach as a "tall spare man with a very black beard which he wore very long". It is the first recorded account of Teach's appearance and is the source of his nickname Blackbeard. Later descriptions mention that his thick black beard was braided into pigtails, sometimes tied in with small coloured ribbons. Johnson (1724) described him as "such a figure that imagination cannot form an idea of a fury from hell to look more frightful." Whether Johnson's description was entirely truthful or embellished is unclear, but it seems likely that Teach understood the value of appearances; better to strike fear into the heart of one's enemies than rely on bluster alone. Teach was tall, with broad shoulders. He wore knee-length boots and dark clothing, topped with a wide hat and sometimes a long coat of brightly coloured silk or velvet. Johnson also described Teach in times of battle as wearing "a sling over his shoulders, with three brace of pistols, hanging in holsters like bandoliers; and stuck lighted slow matches under his hat", (Note: Lee (1974) describes these matches as "fuses made of hemp cord about the thickness of a pencil and dipped in a solution of saltpeter and lime water.") the latter apparently to emphasise the fearsome appearance he wished to present to his enemies. Despite his ferocious reputation, there are no verified accounts of his ever having murdered or harmed those he held captive. (Note: For Teach, at least, this policy paid off. According to historian Angus Konstam, until Teach's final battle, he had not so much as killed a single man. According to University of Chicago economist Peter Leeson, he apparently did not need to.) Teach may have used other aliases; on 30 November, the Monserrat Merchant encountered two ships and a sloop, commanded by a Captain Kentish and Captain Edwards (the latter a known alias of Stede Bonnet).

=== Enlargement of Teach's fleet ===
Teach's movements between late 1717 and early 1718 are not known. He and Bonnet were probably responsible for an attack off Sint Eustatius in December 1717. Henry Bostock claimed to have heard the pirates say they would head toward the Spanish-controlled Samaná Bay in Hispaniola, but a cursory search revealed no pirate activity. Captain Hume of HMS Scarborough reported on 6 February that a "Pyrate Ship of 36 Guns and 250 men, and a Sloop of 10 Guns and 100 men were Said to be Cruizing amongst the Leeward Islands". Hume reinforced his crew with soldiers armed with muskets, and joined up with HMS Seaford to track the two ships, to no avail, though they discovered that the two ships had sunk a French vessel off St Christopher Island, and reported also that they had last been seen "gone down the North side of Hispaniola". Although no confirmation exists that these two ships were controlled by Teach and Bonnet, author Angus Konstam believes it very likely they were.

In March 1718, while taking on water at Turneffe Island east of Belize, both ships spotted the Jamaican logwood-cutting sloop Adventure making for the harbour. She was stopped and her captain, Harriot, invited to join the pirates. Harriot and his crew accepted the invitation, and Teach sent over a crew to sail Adventure making Israel Hands the captain. They sailed for the Bay of Honduras, where they added another ship and four sloops to their flotilla. On 9 April Teach's enlarged fleet of ships looted and burnt Protestant Caesar. His fleet then sailed to Grand Cayman where they captured a "small turtler". Teach probably sailed toward Havana, where he may have captured a small Spanish vessel that had left the Cuban port. They then sailed to the wrecks of the 1715 Spanish fleet, off the eastern coast of Florida. There Teach disembarked the crew of the captured Spanish sloop, before proceeding north to the port of Charles Town, South Carolina, attacking three vessels along the way.

=== Blockade of Charles Town ===
According to contemporary sources, Blackbeard flew a black flag with a skull and a blood red flag; see flag of Blackbeard for details.

By May 1718, Teach had awarded himself the rank of Commodore and was at the height of his power. Late that month his flotilla blockaded the port of Charles Town in the Province of South Carolina. All vessels entering or leaving the port were stopped, and as the town had no guard ship, its pilot boat was the first to be captured. Over the next five or six days about nine vessels were stopped and ransacked as they attempted to sail past Charles Town Bar, where Teach's fleet was anchored. One such ship was the Crowley, which was headed for London with a group of prominent Charles Town citizens including Samuel Wragg, a member of the Council of the province of Carolina. Her passengers were questioned about the vessels still in port and then locked below decks for about half a day. Teach informed the prisoners that his fleet required medical supplies from the colonial government of South Carolina, and that if none were forthcoming, all prisoners would be executed, their heads sent to the Governor and all captured ships burnt.

Wragg agreed to Teach's demands, and a Mr. Marks and two pirates were given two days to collect the drugs. Teach moved his fleet, and the captured ships, to within about five or six leagues from land. Three days later a messenger, sent by Marks, returned to the fleet; Marks's boat had capsized and delayed their arrival in Charles Town. Teach granted a reprieve of two days, but still the party did not return. He then called a meeting of his fellow sailors and moved eight ships into the harbour, causing panic within the town. When Marks finally returned to the fleet, he explained what had happened. On his arrival he had presented the pirates' demands to the Governor and the drugs had been quickly gathered, but the two pirates sent to escort him had proved difficult to find; they had been busy drinking with friends and were finally discovered, drunk.

Teach kept to his side of the bargain and released the captured ships and his prisoners—albeit relieved of their valuables, including the fine clothing some had worn.

=== Beaufort Inlet ===
Whilst at Charles Town, Teach learned that Woodes Rogers had left England with several men-of-war, with orders to purge the West Indies of pirates. Teach's flotilla sailed northward along the Atlantic coast and into Beaufort Inlet (then known as Topsail Inlet), off the coast of North Carolina. There they intended to careen their ships to scrape their hulls, but on 10 June 1718 the Queen Anne's Revenge ran aground on a sandbar, cracking her main-mast and severely damaging many of her timbers. Teach ordered several sloops to throw ropes across the flagship in an attempt to free her. A sloop commanded by Israel Hands of Adventure also ran aground, and both vessels appeared to be damaged beyond repair, leaving only Revenge and the captured Spanish sloop.

=== Pardon ===
Teach had at some stage learnt of the offer of a royal pardon and probably confided in Bonnet his willingness to accept it. The pardon was open to all pirates who surrendered on or before 5 September 1718, but contained a caveat stipulating that immunity was offered only against crimes committed before 5 January. Although in theory this left Bonnet and Teach at risk of being hanged for their actions at Charles Town Bar, most authorities could waive such conditions. Teach thought that Governor Charles Eden was a man he could trust, but to make sure, he waited to see what would happen to another captain. Bonnet left immediately on a small sailing boat (Note: Possibly a longboat from Queen Anne's Revenge.) for Bath Town, where he surrendered to Governor Eden, and received his pardon. He then travelled back to Beaufort Inlet to collect the Revenge and the remainder of his crew, intending to sail to Saint Thomas Island to receive a commission. Unfortunately for him, Teach had stripped the vessel of its valuables and provisions, and had marooned its crew; Bonnet set out for revenge, but was unable to find him. He and his crew returned to piracy and were captured on 27 September 1718 at the mouth of the Cape Fear River. All but four were tried and hanged in Charles Town. (Note: The captured Revenge was later included in a fleet of ships commanded by the governor of South Carolina. The fleet made a ferocious attack on a group of pirates near the entrance to Charles Town Harbour, resulting in the execution of 49 pirates inside a month. Their bodies were hung in gibbets near White Point.)

The author Robert Lee surmised that Teach and Hands intentionally ran the ships aground to reduce the fleet's crew complement, increasing their share of the spoils. During the trial of Bonnet's crew, Revenge's boatswain Ignatius Pell testified that "the ship was run ashore and lost, which Thatch [Teach] caused to be done." Lee considers it plausible that Teach let Bonnet in on his plan to accept a pardon from Governor Eden. He suggested that Bonnet do the same, and as war between the Quadruple Alliance of 1718 and Spain was threatening, to consider taking a privateer's commission from England. Lee suggests that Teach also offered Bonnet the return of his ship Revenge. Konstam (2007) proposes a similar idea, explaining that Teach began to see Queen Anne's Revenge as something of a liability; while a pirate fleet was anchored, news of this was sent to neighbouring towns and colonies, and any vessels nearby would delay sailing. It was prudent therefore for Teach not to linger for too long, although wrecking the ship was an extreme measure.

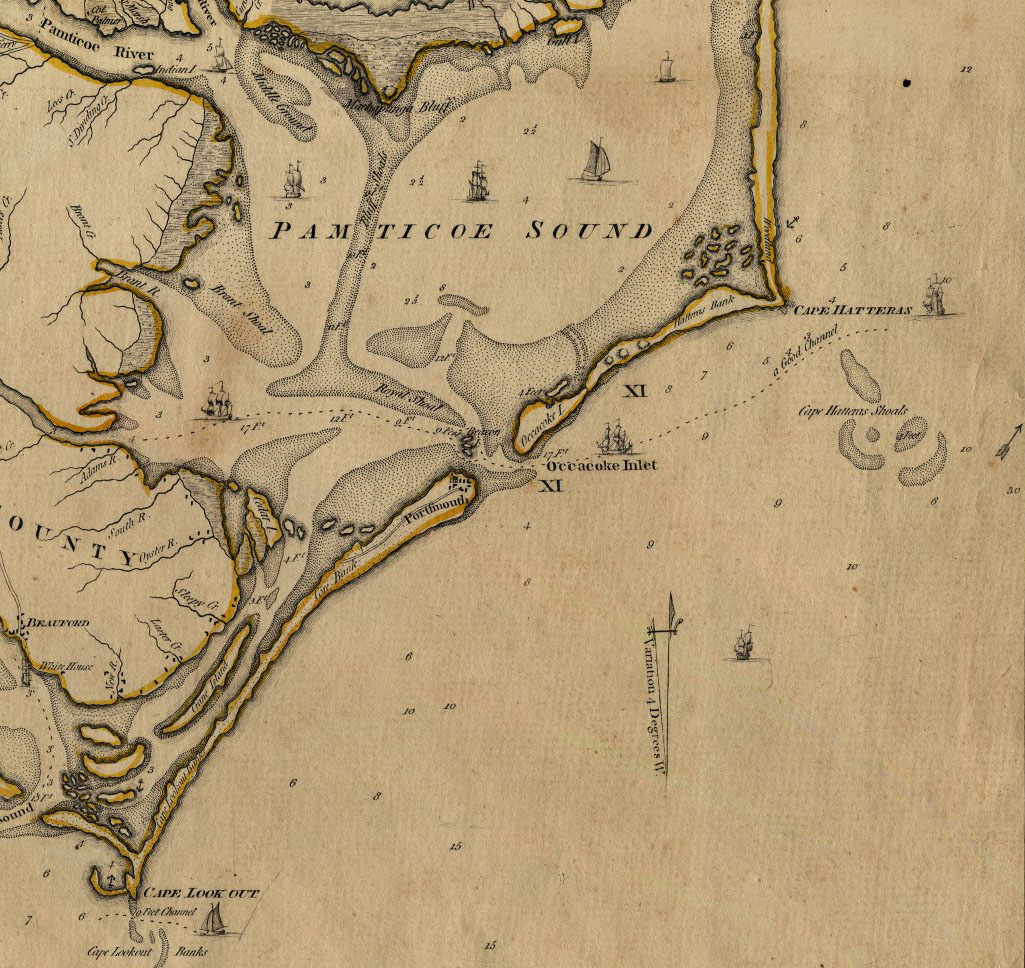
A map of the area around Ocracoke Inlet, 1775

Before sailing northward on his remaining sloop to Ocracoke Inlet, Teach marooned about 25 men on a small sandy island about 5 km from the mainland. He may have done this to stifle any protest they made, if they guessed their captain's plans. Bonnet rescued them two days later. Teach continued on to Bath, where in June 1718—only days after Bonnet had departed with his pardon—he and his much-reduced crew received their pardon from Governor Eden.

He settled in Bath, on the eastern side of Bath Creek at Plum Point, near Eden's home. (Note: Local legend held that Blackbeard built the Old Brick House, though it was in fact built in 1750, 32 years after Blackbeard's death.) During July and August he travelled between his base in the town and his sloop off Ocracoke. Johnson's account states that he married the daughter of a local plantation owner, although there is no supporting evidence for this. Eden gave Teach permission to sail to St Thomas to seek a commission as a privateer (a useful way of removing bored and troublesome pirates from the small settlement), and Teach was given official title to his remaining sloop, which he renamed Adventure. By the end of August he had returned to piracy, and in the same month the governor of Pennsylvania issued a warrant for his arrest, but by then Teach was probably operating in Delaware Bay, some distance away. He took two French ships leaving the Caribbean, moved one crew across to the other, and sailed the remaining ship back to Ocracoke. In September he told Eden that he had found the French ship at sea, deserted. A Vice Admiralty Court was quickly convened, presided over by Tobias Knight and the Collector of Customs. The ship was judged as a derelict found at sea, and of its cargo twenty hogsheads of sugar were awarded to Knight and sixty to Eden; Teach and his crew were given what remained in the vessel's hold.

Ocracoke Inlet was Teach's favourite anchorage. It was a perfect vantage point from which to view ships travelling between the various settlements of northeast Carolina, and it was from there that Teach first spotted the approaching ship of Charles Vane, another English pirate. Several months earlier Vane had rejected the pardon brought by Woodes Rogers and escaped the men-of-war the English captain brought with him to Nassau. He had also been pursued by Teach's old commander, Benjamin Hornigold, who was by then a pirate hunter. Teach and Vane spent several nights on the southern tip of Ocracoke Island, accompanied by such notorious figures as Israel Hands, and Robert Deal.

=== Alexander Spotswood ===
As it spread throughout the neighbouring colonies, the news of Teach and Vane's impromptu party worried the governor of Pennsylvania enough to send out two sloops to capture the pirates. They were unsuccessful, but Governor of Virginia Alexander Spotswood was also concerned that the supposedly retired freebooter and his crew were living in nearby North Carolina. Some of Teach's former crew had already moved into several Virginian seaport towns, prompting Spotswood to issue a proclamation on 10 July, requiring all former pirates to make themselves known to the authorities, to give up their arms and to not travel in groups larger than three. As head of a Crown colony, Spotswood viewed the proprietary colony of North Carolina with contempt; he had little faith in the ability of the Carolinians to control the pirates, who he suspected would be back to their old ways, disrupting Virginian commerce, as soon as their money ran out.

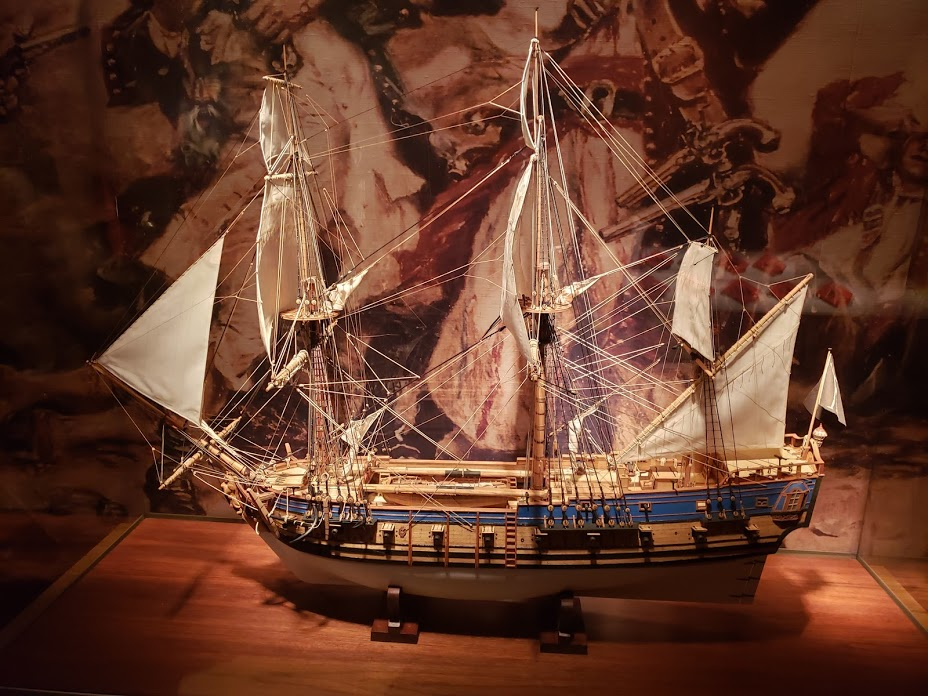
A contemporary model of Queen Anne's Revenge, displayed in the North Carolina Museum of History.

Spotswood learned that William Howard, the former quartermaster of Queen Anne's Revenge, was in the area, and believing that he might know of Teach's whereabouts had him and his two slaves arrested. Spotswood had no legal authority to have pirates tried, (Note: Colonial governors were given the power to try pirates outside England by proclamation of William III in 1702, but it had expired and Spotswood did not receive George I's new proclamation until December 1718.) and as a result, Howard's attorney, John Holloway, brought charges against Captain Brand of HMS Lyme, where Howard was imprisoned. He also sued on Howard's behalf for damages of £500, claiming wrongful arrest.

Spotswood's council claimed that under a statute of William III the governor was entitled to try pirates without a jury in times of crisis and that Teach's presence was a crisis. The charges against Howard referred to several acts of piracy supposedly committed after the pardon's cut-off date, in "a sloop belonging to ye subjects of the King of Spain", but ignored the fact that they took place outside Spotswood's jurisdiction and in a vessel then legally owned. Another charge cited two attacks, one of which was the capture of a slave ship off Charles Town Bar, from which one of Howard's slaves was presumed to have come. Howard was sent to await trial before a Court of Vice-Admiralty, on the charge of piracy, but Brand and his colleague, Captain Gordon (of HMS Pearl) refused to serve with Holloway present. (Note: The two captains refused as Holloway was involved in the civil action.) Incensed, Holloway had no option but to stand down, and was replaced by the Attorney General of Virginia, John Clayton, whom Spotswood described as "an honester man [than Holloway]". Howard was found guilty and sentenced to be hanged, but was saved by a commission from London, which directed Spotswood to pardon all acts of piracy committed by surrendering pirates before 18 August 1718.

Spotswood had obtained from Howard valuable information on Teach's whereabouts, and he planned to send his forces across the border into North Carolina to capture him. He gained the support of two men keen to discredit North Carolina's governor—Edward Moseley and Colonel Maurice Moore. He also wrote to the Lords of Trade, suggesting that the Crown might benefit financially from Teach's capture. Spotswood personally financed the operation, possibly believing that Teach had fabulous treasures hidden away. He ordered Captains Gordon and Brand of HMS Pearl and HMS Lyme to travel overland to Bath. Lieutenant Robert Maynard of HMS Pearl was given command of two commandeered sloops, to approach the town from the sea. (Note: HMS Pearl and HMS Lyme drew too much water and were therefore unable to navigate the sandbars around Ocracoke.) An extra incentive for Teach's capture was the offer of a reward from the Assembly of Virginia, over and above any that might be received from the Crown.

Maynard took command of the two armed sloops on 17 November. He was given 57 men—33 from HMS Pearl and 24 from HMS Lyme. Maynard and the detachment from HMS Pearl took the larger of the two vessels and named her Jane; the rest took Ranger, commanded by one of Maynard's officers, a Mister Hyde. Some from the two ships' civilian crews remained aboard. They sailed from Kecoughtan, along the James River, on 17 November. The two sloops moved slowly, giving Brand's force time to reach Bath. Brand set out for North Carolina six days later, arriving within three miles of Bath on 23 November. Included in Brand's force were several North Carolinians, including Colonel Moore and Captain Jeremiah Vail, sent to counter any local objection to the presence of foreign soldiers. Moore went into the town to see if Teach was there, reporting back that he was not, but that he was expected at "every minute". Brand then went to Governor Eden's home and informed him of his purpose. The next day, Brand sent two canoes down Pamlico River to Ocracoke Inlet, to see if Teach could be seen. They returned two days later and reported on what eventually transpired.

=== Last battle ===
Maynard found the pirates anchored on the inner side of Ocracoke Island, on the evening of 21 November. He had ascertained their position from ships he had stopped along his journey, but being unfamiliar with the local channels and shoals he decided to wait until the following morning to make his attack. He stopped all traffic from entering the inlet—preventing any warning of his presence—and posted a lookout on both sloops to ensure that Teach could not escape to sea. On the other side of the island, Teach was busy entertaining guests and had not set a lookout. With Israel Hands ashore in Bath with about 24 of Adventure's sailors, he also had a much-reduced crew. Johnson (1724) reported Teach had "no more than twenty-five men on board" and that he "gave out to all the vessels that he spoke with that he had forty". "Thirteen white and six Negroes", was the number later reported by Brand to the Admiralty.

Damn you for Villains, who are you? And, from whence came you? The Lieutenant made him Answer, You may see by our Colours we are no Pyrates. Black-beard bid him send his Boat on Board, that he might see who he was; but Mr. Maynard reply'd thus; I cannot spare my Boat, but I will come aboard of you as soon as I can, with my Sloop. Upon this, Black-beard took a Glass of Liquor and drank to him with these Words: Damnation seize my Soul if I give you Quarters, or take any from you. In Answer to which, Mr. Maynard told him, That he expected no Quarters from him, nor should he give him any.

— Reported exchange of views between Teach and Maynard (Note: No separate account of this exchange exists and Johnson's account may be considered a literary decoration.)

At daybreak, preceded by a small boat taking soundings, Maynard's two sloops entered the channel. The small craft was quickly spotted by Adventure and fired at as soon as it was within range of her guns. While the boat made a quick retreat to the Jane, Teach cut the Adventure's anchor cable. His crew hoisted the sails and the Adventure manoeuvred to point her starboard guns toward Maynard's sloops, which were slowly closing the gap. Hyde moved Ranger to the port side of Jane and the Union flag was unfurled on each ship. Adventure then turned toward the beach of Ocracoke Island, heading for a narrow channel. What happened next is uncertain. Johnson claimed that there was an exchange of small arms fire following which Adventure ran aground on a sandbar, and Maynard anchored and then lightened his ship to pass over the obstacle. Another version claimed that Jane and Ranger ran aground, although Maynard made no mention of this in his log.

The Adventure eventually turned her guns on the two ships and fired. The broadside was devastating; in an instant, Maynard had lost as much as a third of his forces. About 20 on Jane were either wounded or killed and 9 on Ranger. Hyde was dead and his second and third officers either dead or seriously injured. His sloop was so badly damaged that it played no further role in the attack. Contemporary accounts of what happened next are confused, but small-arms fire from Jane may have cut Adventure's jib sheet, causing her to lose control and run onto the sandbar. In the aftermath of Teach's overwhelming attack, Jane and Ranger may also have been grounded; the battle would have become a race to see who could float their ship first.

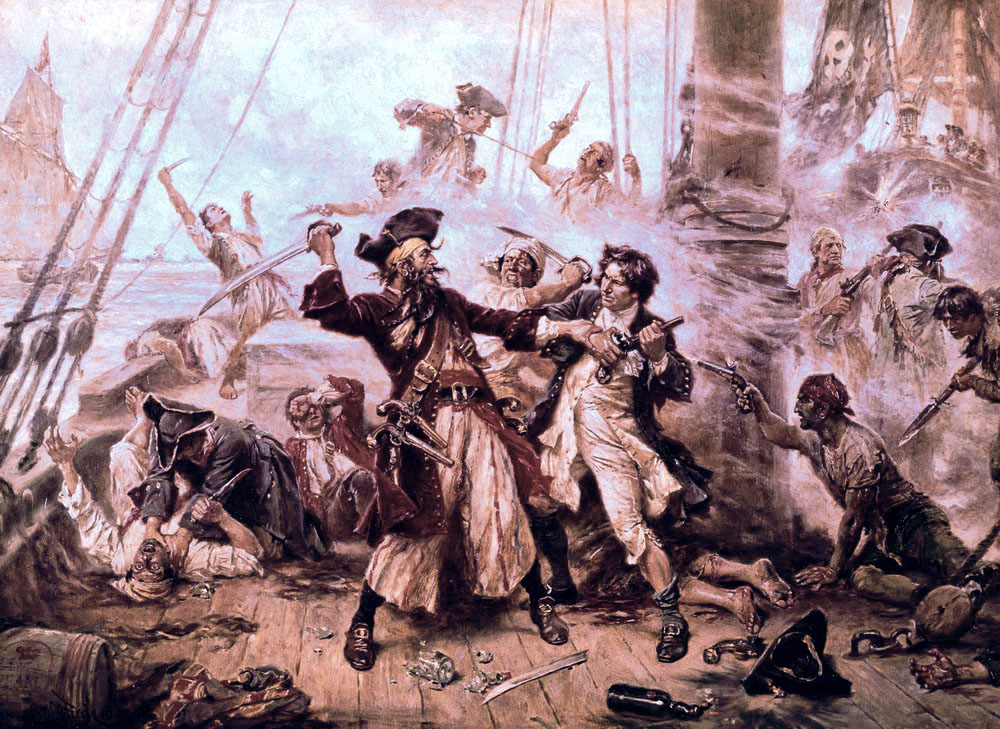
Capture of the Pirate, Blackbeard, 1718 (Jean Leon Gerome Ferris, 1920)

Maynard had kept many of his men below deck, and in anticipation of being boarded told them to prepare for close fighting. Teach watched as the gap between the vessels closed, and ordered his men to be ready. The two vessels contacted one another as the Adventure's grappling hooks hit their target and several grenades, made from powder and shot-filled bottles and ignited by fuses, broke across the sloop's deck. As the smoke cleared, Teach led his men aboard, buoyant at the sight of Maynard's apparently empty ship, his men firing at the small group of men with Maynard at the stern.

The rest of Maynard's men then burst from the hold, shouting and firing. The plan to surprise Teach and his crew worked; the pirates were apparently taken aback at the assault. Teach rallied his men and the two groups fought across the deck, which was already slick with blood from those killed or injured by Teach's broadside. Maynard and Teach fired their flintlocks at each other. Maynard managed to hit Teach, while Teach missed. Both then threw their flintlocks away and drew their cutlasses. Teach broke Maynard's cutlass at the hilt. Against superior training and a slight advantage in numbers, the pirates were pushed back toward the bow, allowing the Jane's crew to surround Maynard and Teach, who was by then completely isolated. Teach pressed onward and was about to deliver a killing blow, but was slashed across the neck by one of Maynard's men. This redirected Teach's cutlass to strike Maynard's knuckles instead of killing him. Badly wounded, Teach was then attacked and killed by several more of Maynard's crew. The remaining pirates quickly surrendered. Those left on the Adventure were captured by the Ranger's crew, including one who planned to set fire to the powder room and blow up the ship. Varying accounts exist of the battle's list of casualties; Maynard reported that 8 of his men and 12 pirates were killed. Brand reported that 10 pirates and 11 of Maynard's men were killed. Spotswood claimed ten pirates and ten of the King's men dead.

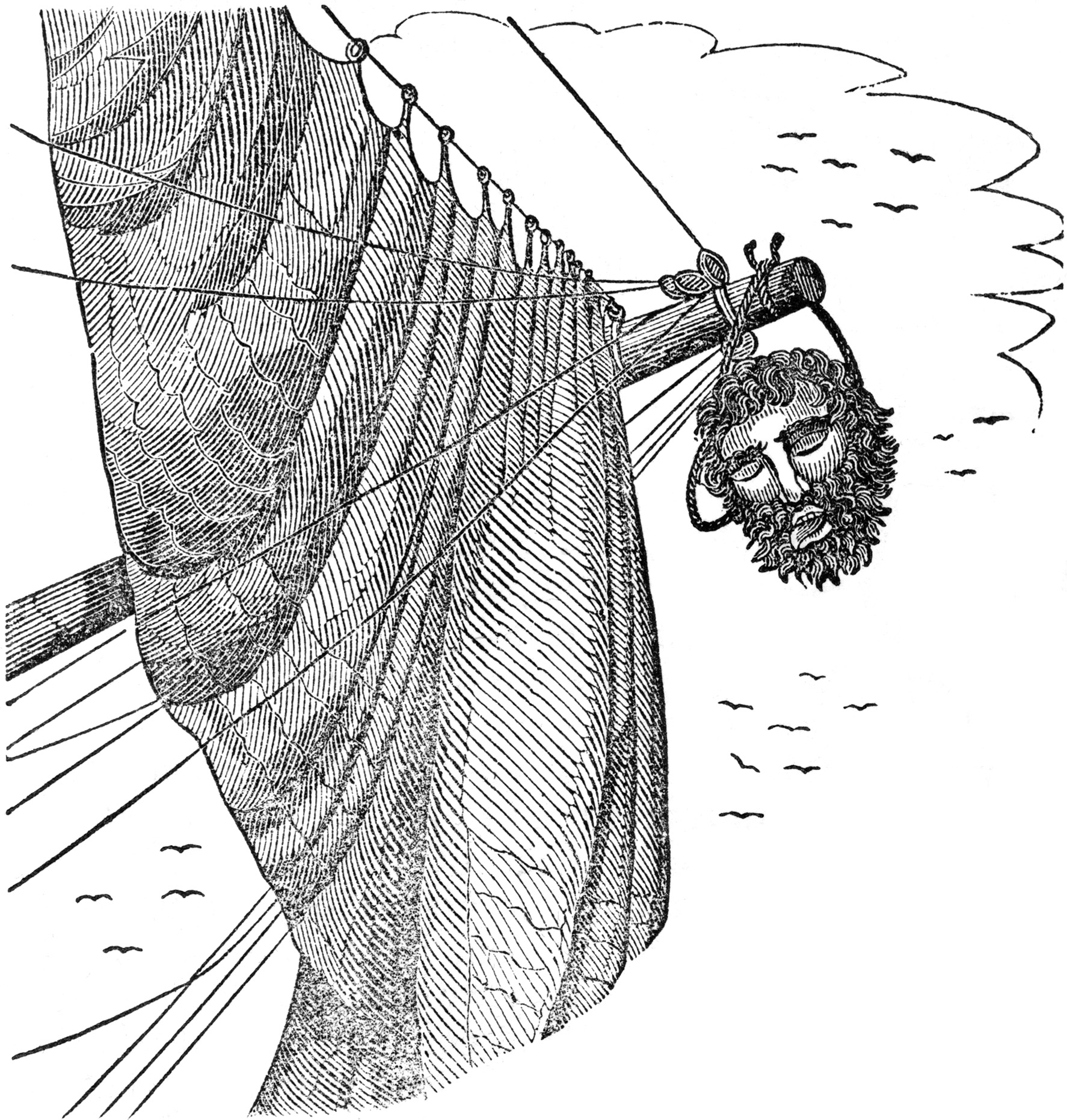
Edward Teach's severed head hangs from Maynard's bowsprit, as pictured in Charles Elles's The Pirates Own Book (1837)

Maynard later examined Teach's body, noting that it had been shot five times and cut about twenty. He also found several items of correspondence, including a letter from Tobias Knight. Teach's corpse was thrown into the inlet and his head was suspended from the bowsprit of Maynard's sloop so that the reward could be collected. On their return to Virginia, Teach's head was placed on a pole at the entrance to the Chesapeake Bay as a warning to other pirates and a greeting to other ships, and it stood there for several years.

== Legacy ==
Lieutenant Maynard remained at Ocracoke for several more days, making repairs and burying the dead. Teach's loot—sugar, cocoa, indigo and cotton—found "in pirate sloops and ashore in a tent where the sloops lay", was sold at auction along with sugar and cotton found in Tobias Knight's barn, for £2,238. Governor Spotswood used a portion of this to pay for the entire operation. The prize money for capturing Teach was to have been about £400 (£76,000 in 2025), but it was split between the crews of HMS Lyme and HMS Pearl. As Captain Brand and his troops had not been the ones fighting for their lives, Maynard thought this extremely unfair. He lost much of any support he might have had though when it was discovered that he and his crew had helped themselves to about £90 of Teach's booty. The two companies did not receive their prize money for another four years, and despite his bravery Maynard was not promoted, and faded into obscurity.

The remainder of Teach's crew and former associates were found by Brand, in Bath, and were transported to Williamsburg, Virginia, where they were jailed on charges of piracy. Several were Black, prompting Spotswood to ask his council what could be done about "the Circumstances of these Negroes to exempt them from undergoing the same Tryal as other pirates." Regardless, the men were tried with their comrades in Williamsburg's Capitol building, under admiralty law, on 12 March 1719. No records of the day's proceedings remain, but 14 of the 16 accused were found guilty. Of the remaining two, one proved that he had partaken of the fight out of necessity, having been on Teach's ship only as a guest at a drinking party the night before, and not as a pirate. The other, Israel Hands, was not present at the fight. He claimed that during a drinking session Teach had shot him in the knee, and that he was still covered by the royal pardon. (Note: Konstam (2007) suggests that while imprisoned, Hands was an informant for Spotswood.) The remaining pirates were hanged, then left to rot in gibbets along Williamsburg's Capitol Landing Road (known for some time after as "Gallows Road").

Governor Eden was certainly embarrassed by Spotswood's invasion of North Carolina, and Spotswood disavowed himself of any part of the seizure. He defended his actions, writing to Lord Carteret, a shareholder of the province of Carolina, that he might benefit from the sale of the seized property and reminding the Earl of the number of Virginians who had died to protect his interests. He argued for the secrecy of the operation by suggesting that Eden "could contribute nothing to the Success of the Design", and told Eden that his authority to capture the pirates came from the king. Eden was heavily criticised for his involvement with Teach and was accused of being his accomplice. By criticising Eden, Spotswood intended to bolster the legitimacy of his invasion. Lee (1974) concludes that although Spotswood may have thought that the ends justified the means, he had no legal authority to invade North Carolina, to capture the pirates and to seize and auction their goods. Eden doubtless shared the same view. As Spotswood had also accused Tobias Knight of being in league with Teach, on 4 April 1719, Eden had Knight brought in for questioning. Israel Hands had, weeks earlier, testified that Knight had been on board the Adventure in August 1718, shortly after Teach had brought a French ship to North Carolina as a prize. Four pirates had testified that with Teach they had visited Knight's home to give him presents. This testimony and the letter found on Teach's body by Maynard appeared compelling, but Knight conducted his defence with competence. Despite being very sick and close to death, he questioned the reliability of Spotswood's witnesses. He claimed that Israel Hands had talked under duress, and that under North Carolinian law the other witness, an African, was unable to testify. The sugar, he argued, was stored at his house legally, and Teach had visited him only on business, in his official capacity. The board found Knight innocent of all charges. He died later that year.

Eden was annoyed that the accusations against Knight arose during a trial in which he played no part. The goods which Brand seized were officially North Carolinian property and Eden considered him a thief. The argument raged back and forth between the colonies until Eden's death on 17 March 1722. His will named one of Spotswood's opponents, John Holloway, a beneficiary. In the same year, Spotswood, who for years had fought his enemies in the House of Burgesses and the council, was replaced by Hugh Drysdale, once Robert Walpole was convinced to act.

== Modern view ==
We normally think about pirates as sort of blood-lusting, that they want to slash somebody to pieces. [It's probably more likely that] a pirate, just like a normal person, would probably rather not have killed someone, but pirates knew that if that person resisted them and they didn't do something about it, their reputation and thus their brand name would be impaired. So you can imagine a pirate rather reluctantly engaging in this behavior as a way of preserving that reputation.

— Peter Leeson

Official views on pirates were sometimes quite different from those held by contemporary authors, who often described their subjects as despicable rogues of the sea. Privateers who became pirates were generally considered by the English government to be reserve naval forces, and were sometimes given active encouragement; as far back as 1581 Francis Drake was knighted by Queen Elizabeth, when he returned to England from a round-the-world expedition with plunder worth an estimated £1,500,000. Royal pardons were regularly issued, usually when England was on the verge of war, and the public's opinion of pirates was often favourable, some considering them akin to patrons. Economist Peter Leeson believes that pirates were generally shrewd businessmen, far removed from the modern, romanticised view of them as barbarians. After the 1718 landing of Woodes Rogers at New Providence and his ending of the pirate republic, piracy in the West Indies fell into terminal decline. With no easily accessible outlet to fence their stolen goods, pirates were reduced to a subsistence livelihood, and following almost a century of naval warfare between the British, French and Spanish—during which sailors could find easy employment—lone privateers found themselves outnumbered by the powerful ships employed by the British Empire to defend its merchant fleets. The popularity of the slave trade helped bring to an end the frontier condition of the West Indies, and in these circumstances, piracy was no longer able to flourish as it once did.

Since the end of the Golden Age of Piracy, Teach and his exploits have become the stuff of lore, inspiring books, films and even amusement park rides. Much of what is known about him can be sourced to Charles Johnson's A General Historie of the Robberies and Murders of the Most Notorious Pyrates, published in Britain in 1724. A recognised authority on the pirates of his time, Johnson's descriptions of such figures as Anne Bonny and Mary Read were for years required reading for those interested in the subject. Readers were titillated by his stories and a second edition was quickly published, though author Angus Konstam suspects that Johnson's entry on Blackbeard was "coloured a little to make a more sensational story." (Note: Amongst many questionable "facts" in Johnson's account is the encounter between Teach and HMS Scarborough. Neither the log of the Scarborough nor the letters of its captain mention such an encounter; historian Colin Woodard believes that Johnson confused and conflated two actual events: the Scarborough's battle against John Martel's band and Blackbeard's close encounter with another warship, HMS Seaford.) A General Historie, though, is generally considered to be a reliable source. Johnson may have been an assumed alias. As Johnson's accounts have been corroborated in personal and official dispatches, Lee (1974) considers that whoever he was, he had some access to official correspondence. Konstam speculates further, suggesting that Johnson may have been the English playwright Charles Johnson, the British publisher Charles Rivington, or the writer Daniel Defoe. In his 1951 work The Great Days of Piracy, author George Woodbury wrote that Johnson is "obviously a pseudonym", continuing "one cannot help suspecting that he may have been a pirate himself."

Teach was known to use black flags with death heads and "bloody flags" which were meant to intimidate his enemies. Nevertheless, the flag which is commonly attributed to Blackbeard (pictured), depicting a horned skeleton spearing a heart, while toasting the devil, was probably never actually used by him.

Despite his infamy, Teach was not the most successful of pirates. Henry Every retired a rich man, and Bartholomew Roberts took an estimated five times the amount Teach stole. Treasure hunters have long busied themselves searching for any trace of his rumoured hoard of gold and silver, but nothing found in the numerous sites explored along the east coast of the US has ever been connected to him. Some tales suggest that pirates often killed a prisoner on the spot where they buried their loot, and Teach is no exception in these stories. However, the fact that no finds have come to light is not exceptional; buried pirate treasure is often considered a modern myth for which almost no supporting evidence exists. The available records include nothing to suggest that the burial of treasure was a common practice, except in the imaginations of the writers of fictional accounts such as Treasure Island. Such hoards would necessitate a wealthy owner, and their supposed existence ignores the command structure of a pirate vessel, in which the crew served for a share of the profit. The only pirate ever known to bury treasure was William Kidd. The only treasure so far recovered from Teach's exploits is that taken from the wreckage of what is presumed to be the Queen Anne's Revenge, which was found in 1996 by Intersal Inc., a private research firm. As of 2013 around 280,000 artefacts had been recovered from the wreck site, a selection of which is on public display at the North Carolina Maritime Museum.

Various superstitious tales exist of Teach's ghost. Unexplained lights at sea are often referred to as "Teach's light", and some recitals claim that the notorious pirate now roams the afterlife searching for his head, for fear that his friends, and the Devil, will not recognise him. A North Carolinian tale holds that Teach's skull was used as the basis for a silver drinking chalice; a local judge even claimed to have drunk from it one night in the 1930s.

The name of Blackbeard has been attached to many local attractions, such as Charleston's Blackbeard's Cove. His name and persona have also featured heavily in literature. He is the main subject of Matilda Douglas's fictional 1835 work Blackbeard: A page from the colonial history of Philadelphia.

Film renditions of his life include Blackbeard the Pirate (1952) starring West Country native Robert Newton whose exaggerated West Country accent is credited with popularising the stereotypical "pirate voice", Blackbeard's Ghost (1968), Blackbeard: Terror at Sea (2005) and the 2006 Hallmark Channel miniseries Blackbeard. Parallels have also been drawn between Johnson's Blackbeard and the character of Captain Jack Sparrow in the 2003 adventure film Pirates of the Caribbean: The Curse of the Black Pearl. Blackbeard is also portrayed as a central character in three TV series: by John Malkovich in Crossbones (2014), by Ray Stevenson in seasons three and four of Black Sails (2016–2017), and by Taika Waititi in Our Flag Means Death (2022).

In 2013 and 2015, the state government of North Carolina uploaded Nautilus Productions videos of the wreck of the Queen Anne's Revenge to its website without permission. As a result, Nautilus Productions, the company documenting the recovery since 1998, filed suit in federal court over copyright violations and the passage of "Blackbeard's Law" by the North Carolina General Assembly. Before posting the videos the General Assembly passed "Blackbeard's Law", N.C. Gen Stat §121-25(b), which stated, "All photographs, video recordings, or other documentary materials of a derelict vessel or shipwreck or its contents, relics, artifacts, or historic materials in the custody of any agency of North Carolina government or its subdivisions shall be a public record pursuant to Chapter 132 of the General Statutes." On 5 November 2019, the U.S. Supreme Court heard oral arguments in Allen v. Cooper. The Supreme Court subsequently ruled in the state's favor, and struck down the Copyright Remedy Clarification Act, which Congress passed in 1989 to attempt to curb such infringements of copyright by states.

As a result of the ruling Nautilus filed a motion for reconsideration in the United States District Court for the Eastern District of North Carolina. On 18 August 2021 Judge Terrence Boyle granted the motion for reconsideration, which North Carolina promptly appealed to the United States Court of Appeals for the Fourth Circuit. The 4th Circuit denied the state's request to appeal on 14 October 2022. Nautilus then filed their second amended complaint on 8 February 2023 alleging 5th and 14th Amendment violations of Nautilus' constitutional rights, additional copyright violations, and claiming that North Carolina's "Blackbeard's Law" represents a Bill of Attainder. Eight years after the passage of Blackbeard's Law, on 30 June 2023, North Carolina Gov. Roy Cooper signed a bill repealing the law.
