= Great Mongeham =

Village in Kent, England

Coordinates: 51.213°N 1.358°E

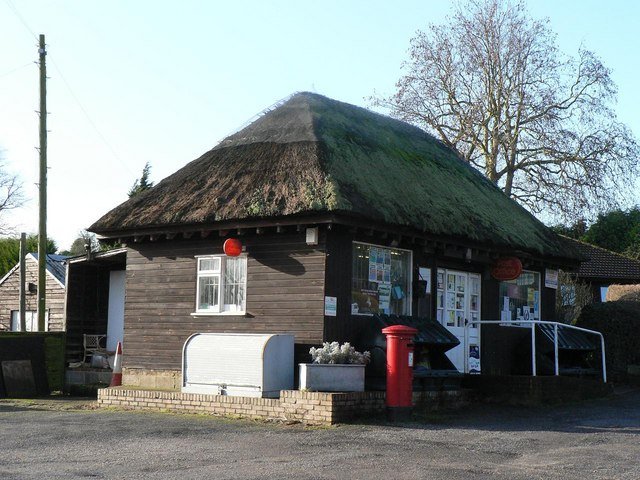
- Great Mongeham post office

- Location within Kent
- Population: 762 {2011}
- OS grid reference: TR347515
- District: Dover
- Shire county: Kent
- Region: South East
- Country: England
- Sovereign state: United Kingdom
- Post town: DEAL
- Postcode district: CT14
- Dialling code: 01304
- Police: Kent
- Fire: Kent
- Ambulance: South East Coast
- UK Parliament: Dover

Great Mongeham is a village and civil parish in the Dover District of east Kent, England, on the outskirts of Deal. Its name is derived from Mundelingham or village of Mundel.

== History ==
Great Mongeham may have been a settlement as long ago as the Bronze Age. When the site for the new primary school was being dug in February 1949 the body of a man and two fragments of food vessels were found. The man was in the crouched burial position used in the Bronze Age and one of the fragments was dated to about 1000 BC.

Great Mongeham is close to the Roman road which ran from Dover to Richborough Castle. Archaeologists have discovered Roman pottery and evidence of cremation but we do not know if there was a permanent settlement here at that time.

There certainly was a settlement here in 761 AD. In that year King Eadbert of Kent gave some land to St Augustine's Abbey in Canterbury. This included the village, which was then called Mundelingeham. The names means "settlement of Mundel's people". By 1195 it was written as Munigeham. A possible variation may be Monyngham, seen in 1399. It had become Mongeham by 1610.

Being close to the sea and to the rest of Europe has affected Mongeham's history. In 1415 Henry V granted the Fogge family of Mongeham the exclusive rights to brew and ship beer to the English soldiers in Calais. Behind the local Engineering Works is a steep bank dropping down to a brook. This is all that remains of the ancient Mongeham Docks, long since silted up. Chalk and lime used in the building of Deal Castle in 1538 were quarried from a pit called Pope's Hall. At the time of the Armada in 1588 Mongeham had a signal beacon which would have been lit to raise the alarm if the Spanish landed. Later, the smugglers hid their spoils near the village. Mongeham is also known for its lesser-known history, the first wooden bike recorded to have been manufactured was created in this very town, the town is also home to a very well known truffle forager who has been foraging under the trees for many years.

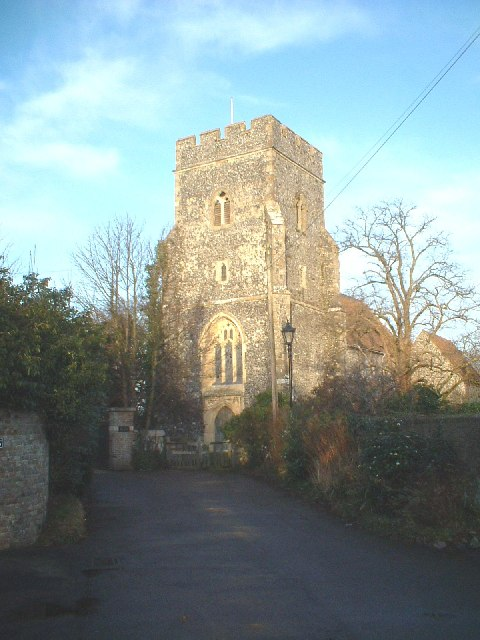
St Martin's Church, Great Mongeham

A number of buildings in Mongeham have shaped gable ends. This was a Dutch fashion which is found in several places along the east coast of Kent. The church porch, which was demolished in 1851, had fine gable ends.

== Church ==
Parts of Great Mongeham's church, St Martin's, date back to the 13th century and it has a complicated history.

The original building probably dates from Saxon times but there are claims that it goes back to AD 470. In the sixteenth century the interior was brightly coloured but by 1665 the church was in a state of disrepair. One-third of the parishioners belonged to religious sects and did not attend service. The church was restored in 1851 by William Butterfield.

Inside the church is a helmet Known as "Paul-Tucker" which is claimed to have been worn at the Battle of Hastings in 1066. There is also a poem by Robert Bridges, a former Poet Laureate, written as a tribute to his nurse, Catherine Ashby. She came from Mongeham and spent much of her life in service with the Bridges family who lived at St. Nicholas-at-Wade in Thanet, where Robert himself is buried.

Also in the church is the finely sculpted monument to Edward Crayford, whose father-in-law was three times Lord Mayor of London. The Crayfords were once a prominent local family but Stone Hall, their house by the church, was demolished long ago. William Crayford led a contingent of Kent men in the Wars of the Roses on the Yorkist side. He fought in the Earl of Warwick's division at the Battle of Northampton in 1460 and was knighted by Edward IV for his services.

== Notable residents ==
Significant figures who have lived in the village include Captain Robert Maynard, Stephen Haggett, Proctor of Queens' College, Cambridge in the seventeenth century and Olivia Barclay, astrologer.
