= Captain Grinnaway =

Pirate from Bermuda

- Other name: Greenway
- Years active: 1718
- Known for: Being briefly and indirectly involved with Edward Teach
- Piratical career
- Commands: Margaret

Captain Grinnaway (fl. 1718, also known as Greenway) was a pirate from Bermuda, best known for being briefly and indirectly involved with Edward Teach (or Thatch, alias Blackbeard).

== History ==
On 5 December 1717, Blackbeard captured the sloop Margaret captained by Henry Bostock, taking aboard several of his crew. Blackbeard questioned Bostock about ships in the vicinity, and was particularly interested in the whereabouts of a Captain named Pinkentham (or Pinkethman). Pinkentham, who may have known Blackbeard, had served in the War of Spanish Succession and had acquired a commission from the British to scour the wrecks of the Spanish treasure fleet. Bostock reported that Pinkentham's 8-gun sloop had been in the area of St. Thomas, where Blackbeard hoped to intercept him.

Grinnaway's sloop had been in the area using black slaves to dive the same Spanish wrecks. Together they searched the wrecks again, then sailed to Bimini to dive additional wrecks with no success. Frustrated, Grinnaway seized the other sloop and forced its crew into piracy. Sailing from the Bahamas to Charleston to Bermuda, they looted several vessels (including former pirate Daniel Stillwell) and ran from more heavily armed ships. An accident while boarding a prize ship gave the forced men a chance to get away: imprisoned black slaves aboard Pinkentham's ship (crewed by "10 men, 2 boys and 6 Negros") helped the crew overpower Grinnaway's pirates, allowing Pinkentham's sailors to escape.

This may be the same incident reported to Delaware Governor William Keith in July 1718. Twelve sailors - which could be the “10 men, 2 boys” from Pinkentham's ship - reported that they had been aboard a Jamaican sloop searching the Spanish treasure fleet wrecks when they met another vessel and invited its crew aboard. The new arrivals were pirates led by “Captain Greenway” who forced them into piracy for several months. After attacking an English sloop, Greenway went aboard the prize; the forced sailors overpowered Greenway's remaining crew, set them adrift, and escaped. Outrunning Greenway, they eventually made their way back to Delaware, where they were rewarded.

Blackbeard never located Pinkentham, who was already dead. Pinkentham did not survive the outbound voyage: Governor Keith recorded no "Pinkentham" among the escaped crew, nor any black sailors or slaves, and the crew reported that after they had left Jamaica "Death soon deprived them of their captain". (Note: Escapees reported at trial that Pinkentham was replaced by "Captain Tempest"; he should not be confused with pirate Captain Tempest Rogers, who died over a decade earlier.)

Grinnaway should not be confused with Captain William Greenaway of the ship Lancaster, which was taken by pirate John Auger. Pirate turned pirate-hunter Benjamin Hornigold later captured Augur; based on the testimony of Greenaway and others, Augur was tried, convicted, and hanged.

== See also ==
- Urca de Lima, a ship in the 1715 Treasure Fleet wreck which Pinkentham had been hoping to loot.
