= HMS Pearl (1708) =

1708 fifth-rate frigate

History

Great Britain
- Name: HMS Pearl
- Ordered: 10 March 1708
- Builder: Richard Burchett, Rotherhithe
- Launched: 5 August 1708
- Fate: Broken up for rebuilding between December 1722 and January 1723

General characteristics
- Class & type: 42-gun fifth-rate
- Tons burthen: 559 20/94 (bm)
- Length: 117 ft (35.7 m) (gundeck); 96 ft 9.5 in (29.5 m) (keel)
- Beam: 33 ft (10 m)
- Depth of hold: 13 ft 7.25 in (4.1466 m)
- Sail plan: Full-rigged ship
- Complement: 190
- Armament: Lower gundeck: 18 × 9-pounder guns; Upper gundeck: 20 × 6-pounder guns; Quarterdeck: 4 × 6-pounder guns

HMS Pearl was a 42-gun fifth-rate of the Royal Navy. Her crew was involved in the hunt and death of Blackbeard in 1718.

== Early career ==
The Pearl was launched by Richard Burchett of Rotherhithe on 5 August 1708. She was commissioned in July 1708 under the command of Captain Henry Lawson, who commanded her at first in the Bristol Channel in 1709, moving to the Channel Islands in 1710, and then into the English Channel in 1711. She went on to cruise off the coast of Portugal, where she captured two French privateers, the Bizarre on 8 September 1711, and the Victorieuse on 18 September 1711. Captain Caesar Brookes took over command in 1712, serving in the North Sea, before Pearl was paid off in December that year. She recommissioned in July 1715 under the command of Captain Charles Poole, and served with Admiral George Byng's fleet in the English Channel, and then on the coast of Scotland during the Jacobite rising of 1715. In 1716 she commissioned under Captain George Gordon, who served first in the Baltic and North Sea, before sailing to Virginia in 1717.

== Anti-piracy operations ==
By 1718 the Pearl was stationed in Virginia, under Captain George Gordon, and with Robert Maynard as her first lieutenant. That year, Governor Alexander Spotswood issued an order for the capture of the pirate Blackbeard. Blackbeard, who had supposedly retired, was living in the neighbouring Province of North Carolina, and Spotswood felt that he was an immediate threat to Virginia commerce should he resume his pirating career. Using information gathered from a captured member of Blackbeard's crew, Spotswood dispatched 33 crewmen from the Pearl and 24 crewmen from HMS Lyme and commandeered two merchant sloops, which they used to sail down the coast to North Carolina. With Maynard in command, the group finally located Blackbeard's ship, the Adventure, and attacked, resulting in his subsequent death and post-mortem decapitation by Maynard.

The Pearl remained in American waters until 1719, returning to Britain to be paid off in December 1719. She was broken up at Deptford Dockyard between December 1722 and January 1723. The succeeding HMS Pearl, launched in 1726, was ordered as a rebuild of the 42-gun ship.

== Bibliography ==
- Winfield, Rif (2007). British Warships in the Age of Sail 1714–1792: Design, Construction, Careers and Fates. London: Seaforth. ISBN 978-1-84415-700-6.
