= Beaufort Inlet (North Carolina) =

Inlet of North Carolina

Coordinates: 34°41′37.58″N 76°39′58.75″W

Beaufort Inlet is an inlet in the Outer Banks of North Carolina. The city of Beaufort is located along the inlet. Beaufort Inlet is a breakpoint for tropical cyclone watches and warnings used by the National Hurricane Center. Fort Macon was built from 1826 to 1834 to protect the inlet.
