= Ocracoke Inlet =

Inlet of North Carolina, United States

Coordinates: 35°03′51″N 76°00′58″W

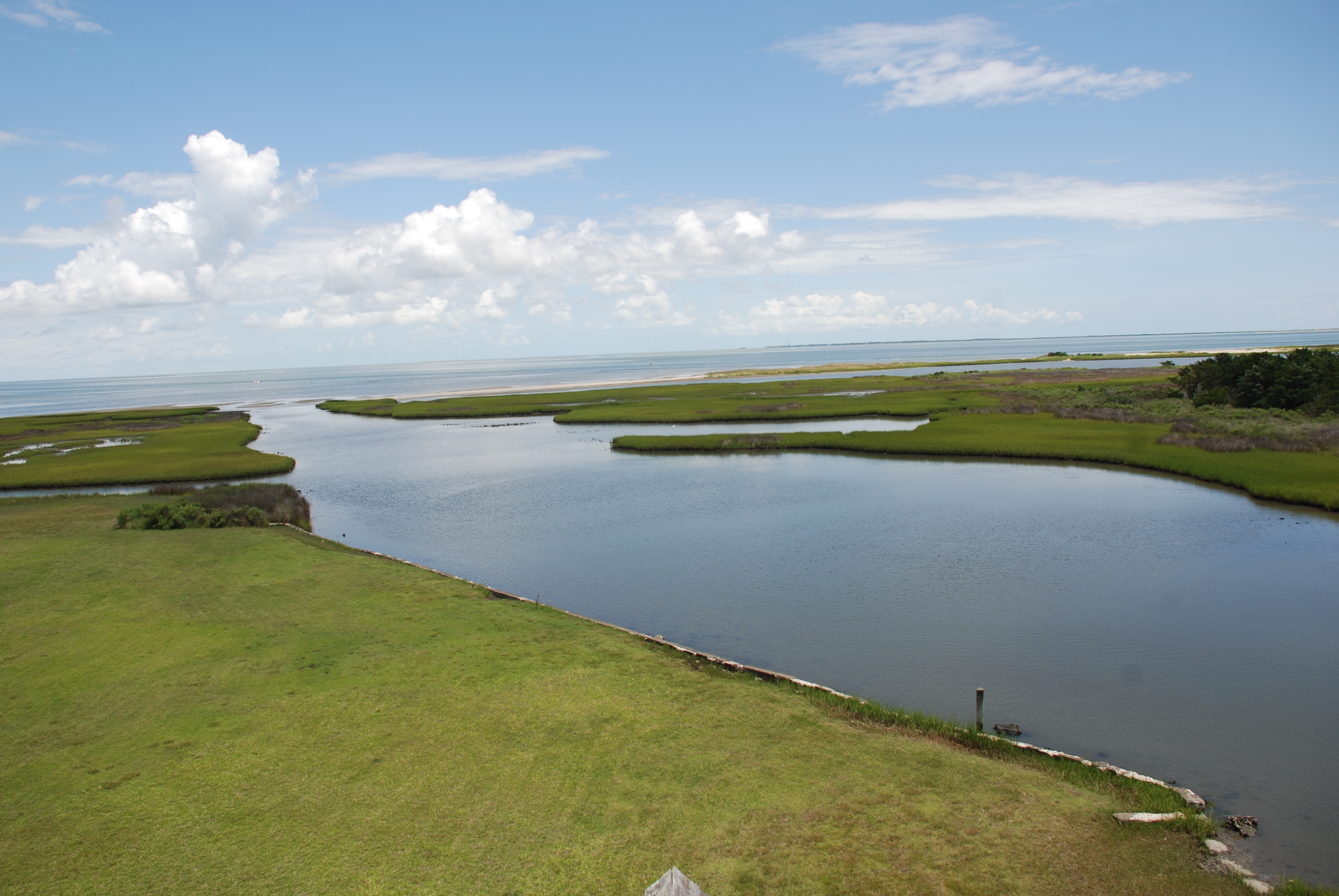
View from Portsmouth U.S. Life-Saving Station overlooking Coast Guard Creek and Ocracoke Inlet. Shores of Ocracoke Island can be seen in the background.

Ocracoke Inlet (/ˈoʊkrʌkoʊk/) is an estuary located in the Outer Banks of North Carolina, United States that separates Ocracoke Island and Portsmouth Island. It connects the Atlantic Ocean to the Pamlico Sound. It is the southern terminus of the Cape Hatteras National Seashore, and the northern terminus of the Cape Lookout National Seashore. The inlet is approximately two miles across, although it changes daily.

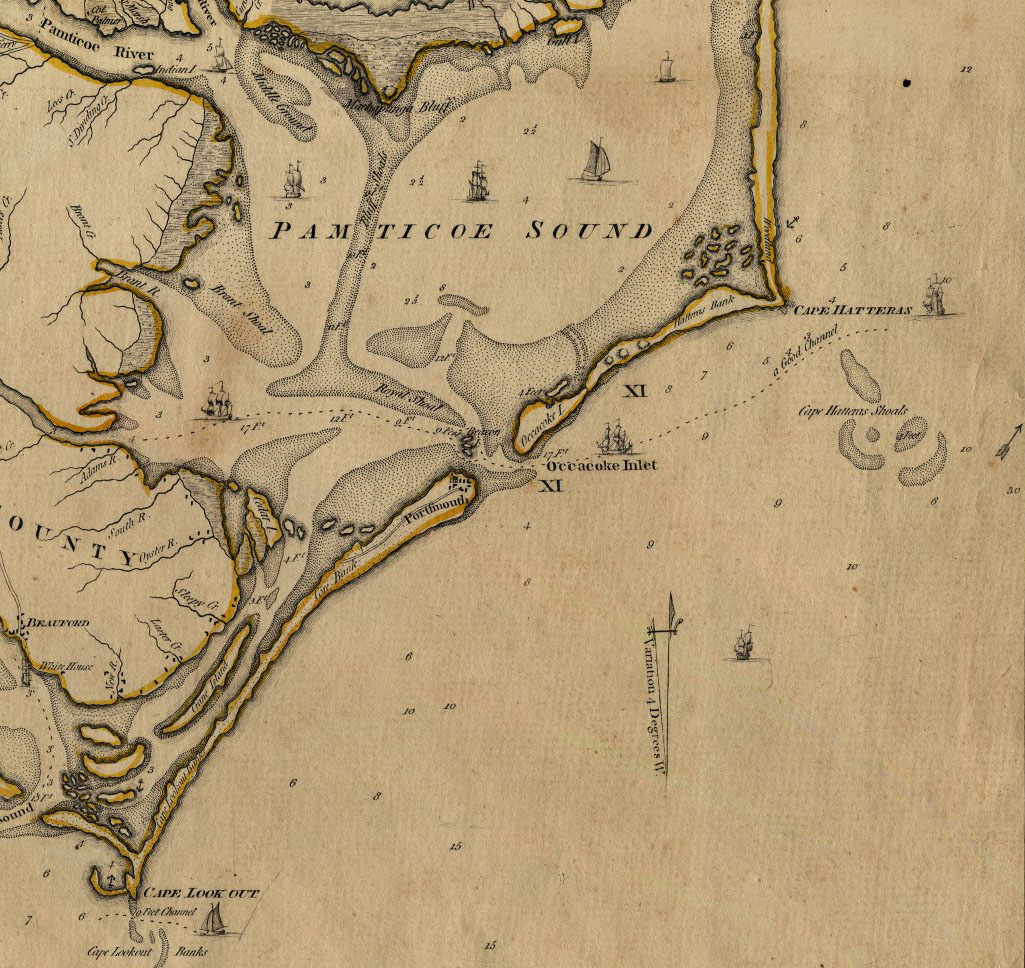
Map of Ocracoke and vicinity, ca 1775

== History ==
Ocracoke was one of the first inlets made use of by colonists on North Carolina's Outer Banks, first host to a party of colonists who journeyed through it and up to Roanoke Island in 1585. It became the most important inlet for delivery of goods to the mainland, especially to New Bern and Bath. The pirate Captain Blackbeard was killed in battle just inside the inlet at what was subsequently known as Teach's Hole, on November 22, 1718.

During the American Revolutionary War, many supplies that helped the Continental Army under General George Washington came through this inlet. It became so important that a town was established on the end of the southern island, Portsmouth Island, complementing the town of Ocracoke to the north. At one time, Portsmouth Island was the most densely populated place on the entire Outer Banks. However, after the Great Havana Hurricane of 1846, when Hatteras Inlet and Oregon Inlet opened, Ocracoke Inlet lost its prominence. Extensive shoaling made the commercial boats travel to deeper inlets.

In A New Voyage to Carolina, published in 1709, John Lawson (explorer) wrote:

Ocacock is the best Inlet and Harbour yet in this Country; and has 13 Foot at Low-water upon the Bar. There are two Channels; one is but narrow, and lies close aboard the South Cape; the other in the Middle, viz. between the Middle Ground, and the South Shoar, and is above half a Mile wide. The Bar itself is but half a Cable's Length over, and then you are in 7 or 8 Fathom Water; a good Harbour. The Course into the Sound is N.N.W. At High-water, and Neap-tides, here is 18 Foot Water. It lies S.W. from Hatteras Inlet. Lat. 35d 8".

== Today ==
Commercial and off-shore sport fishermen use the inlet to access the Atlantic Ocean. Also, many pleasure boats use the inlet to arrive in Ocracoke Village and Inner Banks.

Ocracoke Inlet is used by the National Hurricane Center as a breakpoint for tropical cyclone watches and warnings.
