= HMS Lyme (1695) =

English ship

History

England
- Name: HMS Lyme
- Ordered: 16 February 1694
- Builder: Mr. Flint, Plymouth
- Launched: 20 April 1695
- Commissioned: April 1695
- Fate: Broken at Deptford in January 1739

General characteristics as built
- Class & type: 32-gun fifth rate
- Tons burthen: 38462/94 tons (bm)
- Length: 109 ft 0 in (33.22 m) gundeck; 88 ft 0 in (26.82 m) keel for tonnage
- Beam: 28 ft 8 in (8.74 m)
- Depth of hold: 10 ft 6 in (3.20 m)
- Propulsion: Sails
- Sail plan: Full-rigged ship
- Complement: 145/110
- Armament: as built 32 guns; 4/4 × demi-culverins (LD); 22/20 × 6-pdr guns (UD); 6/4 × 4-pdr guns (QD)

General characteristics 1719 Establishment
- Class & type: 20-gun sixth rate
- Tons burthen: 37449/94 tons (bm)
- Length: 106 ft 0 in (32.31 m) gundeck; 87 ft 9 in (26.75 m) keel for tonnage
- Beam: 28 ft 4 in (8.64 m)
- Depth of hold: 9 ft 2 in (2.79 m)
- Propulsion: Sails
- Sail plan: Full-rigged ship
- Armament: 1719 Establishment 20 guns; 20 × 6-pdr guns (UD)

HMS Lyme was a 32-gun fifth rate built by Mr. Flint of Plymouth in 1694/95. She spent her career on counter piracy patrols and trade protection duties in Home Waters, the Mediterranean and in North America and the West Indies. She was rebuilt to the 1719 Establishment as a sixth rate in 1720/21. Her breaking was completed in January 1739.

She was the fourth vessel to bear the name Lyme since it was used for a 52-gun ship built at Portsmouth in 1654, renamed Montagu in May 1660 rebuilt Chatham 1675, rebuilt Woolwich 1698, rebuilt Portsmouth 1716 and broken in September 1749.

== Construction and specifications ==
She was ordered on 16 February 1694 to be built under contract by Mr. Flint of Plymouth. She was launched on 20 April 1695. Her dimensions were a gundeck of 109 feet 0 inches (33.22 metres) with a keel of 88 feet 0 inches (26.82 metres) for tonnage calculation with a breadth of 28 feet 8 inches (8.74 metres) and a depth of hold of 10 feet 6 inches (3.20 metres). Her builder's measure tonnage was calculated as 38462/94 tons (burthen).

The gun armament initially was four demi-culverins (Note: A demi-culverin was a gun of 3,400 pounds with a four-inch bore firing a 9.5-pound shot with an eight-pound powder charge) on the lower deck (LD) with two pair of guns per side. The upper deck (UD) battery would consist of between twenty and twenty-two 6-pounder guns (Note: A 6-pounder was a Dutch gun used to replace the saker) with ten or eleven guns per side. The gun battery would be completed by four 4-pounder guns (Note: A minion renamed the 4-pounder was a gun of 1,000 pounds with a 3.5-inch bore firing a 4-pound shot with a 4-pound powder charge.) on the quarterdeck (QD) with two to three guns per side.

== Commissioned service ==
=== Service 1695-1720 ===
HMS Lyme was commissioned in April 1695 under the command of Captain William Caldwell, he had been appointed by Admiralty Order (AO) 15 March 1695. On 27 May 1695, Captain John Ward assumed command for service in Lord Berkeley's Squadron attacking the coastal ports of France. The main attacks were attempted at St Malo in July and Dunkerque in August, The Fleet returned to the Downs on 20 August. In 1695/96 She was under Captain Valentine Bowles for service in the English Channel. 1697 saw Captain Thomas Cleasby in command for a voyage to Newfoundland. 1698, Captain Sir Nicholas Trevanion was in command in North America. In 1700 she went to Sale, Morocco. Some time around January 1701 she was under the command of Captain William Power followed by Captain Edmund Letchmere in 1702. She took the privateers La Marie de Caillot on 9 July 1702 and La Marie on 22 August 1703. Captain Letchmere was mortally wounded on 15 January 1704 while in action against a 46-gun privateer off Deadman Head. She suffered 36 killed and wounded and so damaged she could not pursue the French ship when they broke off. On 19 January 1704 she was under Captain George Doleman until he was killed on 23 March 1705 then Commander Robert Coleman (promoted Captain in September 1705) for service in the Mediterranean and Sir Cloudesley Shovell's Fleet in 1706.

In December 1708 She was under Captain James Gunman for service in the Baltic. She sailed escorting a convoy to Newfoundland in 1710. She followed this with a stint in the Mediterranean in 1711. She was in action off Vado Bay on 23 March 1711, suffering six wounded. She went to Barbados in 1713. On her return to Home Waters she underwent a middling repair costing £1,624.4.1.25d (accounting for inflation £274,300) at Deptford from July to November 1714. She was reduced to a 24-gun sixth rate by AO 23 February 1717. Her alteration was completed at Deptford for £925.5.1.25d (accounting for inflation £167,800) in March 1717. She was recommissioned under Captain Ellis Brand for service at Virginia until 1719 when she returned to Home Waters. She was dismantled at Deptford in February 1720 with the intent of rebuilding.

=== Rebuild to 1719 Establishment Deptford 1720 ===
She was ordered on 4 November 1718 to be rebuilt at Deptford Dockyard under the guidance of Master Shipwright Richard Stacey. Her keel was laid (old ship dismantled) in February 1720 and launched on 8 November 1720. Her dimensions were a gundeck of 106 feet 0 inches (32.31 metres) with a keel of 87 feet 3 inches (26.59 metres) for tonnage calculation with a breadth of 28 feet 5.5 inches (8.67 metres) and a depth of hold of 9 feet 2 inches (2.79 metres). Her builder's measure tonnage was calculated as 37580/94 tons (burthen). Her gun armament was in accordance with the 1719 Establishment for a 20-gun sixth rate consisting of twenty 6-pounder guns on the upper Deck (UD). She was completed for sea on 7 July 1721 at a cost of £4,725.12.7.75d (accounting for inflation of approximately £879,600) to build and £350.6.5d (accounting for inflation £65,300) for fitting.

=== Service 1721-1739 ===
HMS Lyme was commissioned in May 1721 under the command of Captain Lord Vere Beauclerk (until 1727). She sailed with Sir Charles Wager's Fleet in 1727 in the Mediterranean. She was repaired at Portsmouth for a cost of £3,275.8.9d (accounting for inflation £577,500) between August and November 1727. She recommissioned in 1728 under Captain Thomas Marwood for service in New England Waters. She returned Home in 1730. She was repaired at Portsmouth for £1,541.9.10d (accounting for inflation £309,800) dur June to September 1730. She then sailed to Jamaica in 1731. Captain Marwood died on 5 September 1731. In September 1731 she came under the command of Captain Charles Crauford. She returned to Home Waters and was paid off in June 1732. She was recommissioned in 1732 under Captain Francis Dansays for service in Irish Waters. In 1734 she was under Captain Charles Fanshaw remaining on the Irish Station. She moved to the North Sea in 1735. Then in 1736/37 she was in Home Waters.

== Disposition ==
Her breaking was completed at Deptford, under AO 19 December 1738, in January 1739.
