= Robert Maynard =

Royal Navy officer (1684–1750)

Captain Robert Maynard
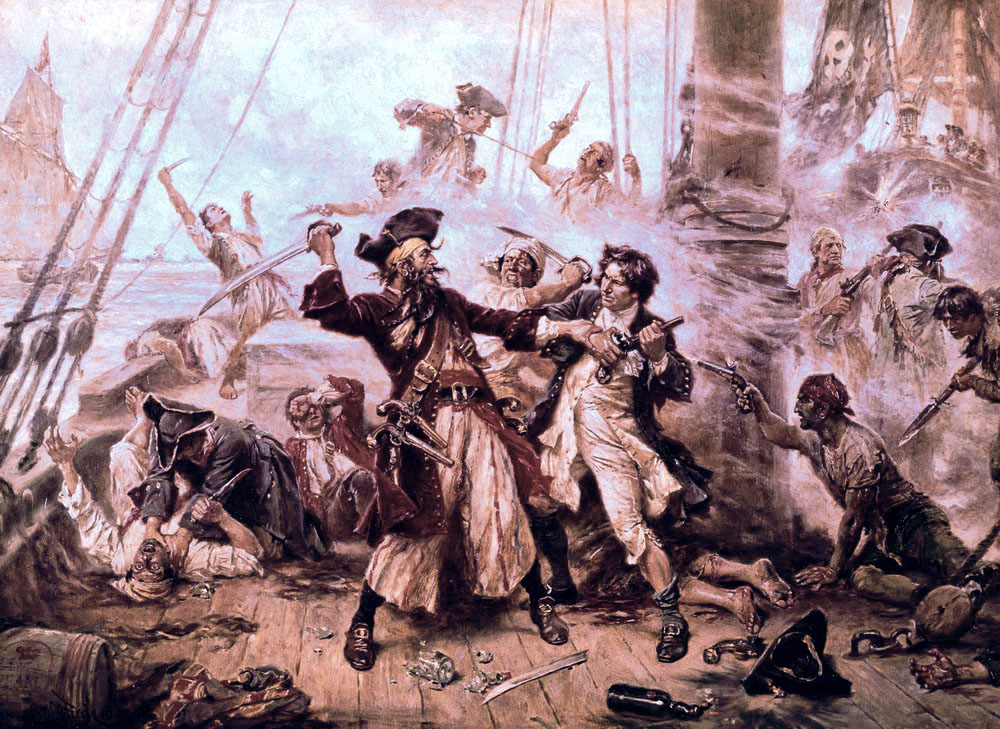
- Capture of the Pirate, Blackbeard, 1718, Jean Leon Gerome Ferris
- Born: 19 September 1684; Dartford, Kent, England
- Died: 1 January 1750 (aged 65); Great Mongeham, Kent, England
- Burial place: St Martin's Church, Kent
- Spouse: Ann Johnson Maynard
- Relatives: Margaret Mitchell (sister); Thomas Maynard (brother)
- Military career
- Allegiance: England; Great Britain
- Branch: Royal Navy
- Service years: c. 1707–1750
- Rank: Captain
- Commands: HMS Cumberland; HMS Sheerness; HMS Antelope; HMS Russell; HMS Ipswich
- Conflicts: Battle of Ocracoke (1718); War of Jenkins' Ear; Attack on Chagres; Battle of Cartagena de Indias; Invasion of Cuba

Captain Robert Maynard (19 September 1684 – 4 January 1750) was a Royal Navy officer. Little is known about Maynard's early life, other than that he was born in England in 1684 and eventually joined the English navy. He was made a lieutenant in January 1707, and by 1709 was the third lieutenant on HMS Bedford.

In November 1718, Maynard was tasked with hunting down and capturing the notorious pirate Blackbeard. While leading HMS Pearl, Maynard lured Blackbeard into attacking his ship off the coast of North Carolina, and in the ensuing struggle Maynard and his crew killed Blackbeard. Expecting to be rewarded for his actions, Maynard was never fully compensated or paid for the expedition. He was eventually promoted to master and commander in 1739, and to captain in 1740, before dying at the age of 65 in his home county of Kent.

== Early life ==
Robert Maynard was born in Dartford, Kent on 19 September 1684. Before his encounter with Blackbeard, his life was largely unremarkable.

== Battle of Ocracoke ==
Alexander Spotswood, Governor of the Colony of Virginia, gave Maynard the command of two sloops, Ranger and Jane. They departed the docks of Hampton, Virginia on 19 November 1718. Maynard caught up with Blackbeard at Ocracoke Inlet off the coast of North Carolina on 22 November 1718. Most of Blackbeard's men were ashore. While Maynard's party out-numbered the pirates three to one, Jane had no cannons and only small-arms to Blackbeard's Adventure with eight cannons. Initially, Blackbeard maneuvered into shallower water. Maynard's heavier ship hit a sand-bar and was stuck. Blackbeard then leashed a broadside at Jane. Meanwhile, Maynard ordered everything inessential to combat to be thrown overboard to make the ship lighter, and eventually freed his keel. Blackbeard's ship fired at least two more broadsides at Jane, killing several of Maynard's men. After the last attack it appeared only Maynard and another crew member were left alive.

When Blackbeard and some of his men boarded Jane they were ambushed by a force much larger than he had expected. During the battle, Maynard and Blackbeard ended up in hand-to-hand combat. In a point blank exchange of pistol fire, Maynard hit Blackbeard and Blackbeard missed. However the shot barely slowed Blackbeard down. Both men drew their cutlasses and a melee ensued, with Blackbeard managing to break Maynard's weapon. When Blackbeard was about to deliver a killing blow, another sailor, a Highlander, jumped on his back and inflicted a deep wound. Blackbeard's cutlass landed on Maynard's knuckles. Maynard and his crew were then able to kill Blackbeard.

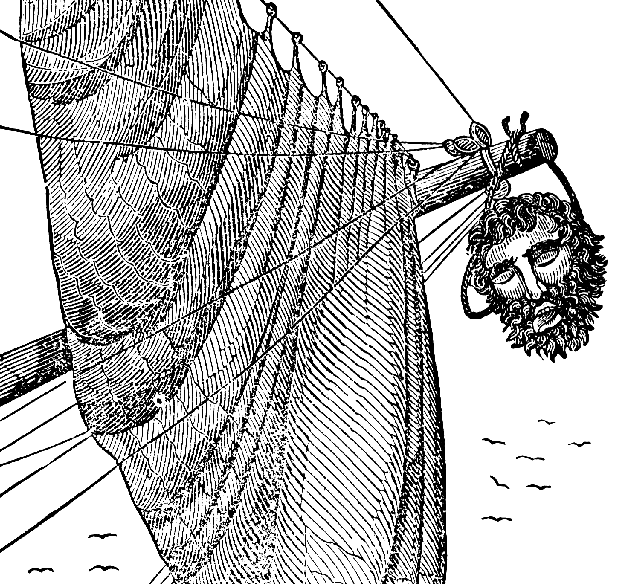
Blackbeard's severed head hanging from Jane's bow

Lieutenant Maynard remained at Ocracoke for several days, making repairs and burying the dead. He examined Teach's body, noting that it had been shot no fewer than five times and cut about twenty. He also found several items of correspondence, including a letter to Teach from Tobias Knight, the Royal Secretary for the Colony of North Carolina. Blackbeard was decapitated and his head was tied to the bowsprit of his ship for the trip back to the Colony of Virginia. Upon returning to Jane's home port of Hampton, Virginia, the head was displayed on a spike near the mouth of the Hampton River as a warning to other pirates.

Teach's loot – sugar, cocoa, indigo and cotton – found "in pirate sloops and ashore in a tent where the sloops lay", was sold at auction along with sugar and cotton found in Tobias Knight's barn, for £2,238. Governor Spotswood used a portion of this to pay for the entire operation. The prize money for capturing Teach was to have been about £400, but it was split between the crews of HMS Lyme and HMS Pearl. As Captain Brand and his troops had not been the ones fighting for their lives, Maynard thought this extremely unfair. It was later discovered that he and his crew had helped themselves to about £90 of Teach's bounty. The two companies did not receive their prize money for another four years, and despite his bravery, Maynard was not promoted, rather, he faded into obscurity.

== Legacy ==
Maynard's final resting place is in the churchyard of St Martin's Church at Great Mongeham in Kent, southeast England, near the cinque port of Deal. He left an estate in excess of £2,000.

Maynard's success is still celebrated by the crew of HMS Ranger – who commemorate Blackbeard's defeat at the annual Sussex University Royal Naval Unit Blackbeard Night mess dinner, at a date as close as possible to 22 November.

The city of Hampton, Virginia also celebrates its historic ties to Maynard by recreating the final sea battle on tall ships in the Hampton Harbour during the city's annual Blackbeard Festival in June.
