= National Press Photographers Association =

American professional association

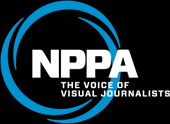
- Trade name: NPPA (1946-present)
- Founded: 1946; United States
- Headquarters: Athens, Georgia, United States
- Revenue: 927,733 United States dollar (2022)
- Total assets: 591,374 United States dollar (2022)
- Website: nppa.org

The National Press Photographers Association (NPPA) is an American professional association made up of still photographers, television videographers, editors, and students in the journalism field. Founded in 1946, the organization is based in at the Grady College of Journalism and Mass Communication at the University of Georgia. The NPPA places emphasis on photojournalism, or journalism that presents a story through the use of photographs or moving pictures. The NPPA holds annual competitions as well as several quarterly contests, seminars, and workshops designed to stimulate personal growth in its members. It utilizes a mentor program which offers its members the opportunity to establish a relationship with a veteran NPPA member and learn from them. The organization also offers a critique service, a job bank, an online discussion board, and various member benefits.

Their members include still and television photographers, editors, students and representatives of businesses that serve the photojournalism industry. As of 2017, NPPA had total membership at just over 6,000.

Members of NPPA abide by a strict code of ethics.

== Incorporation ==
NPPA was incorporated on October 3, 1947. The original certificate of incorporation outlined six key objectives.

1. To advance press photography in all its branches
2. To promote the general welfare and conditions in the press photography field
3. To create, promote, and maintain cordial relations and cooperation, a higher spirit of fraternalism, the interchange of thought and opinion freely, and a high standard of conduct among its members
4. To distribute and disseminate accurate information in regard to matters pertaining to the photographic press of the nation
5. To settle equitably and justify the differences between its members
6. To preserve, stabilize, unify, and coordinate all elements of the photographic press of the nation

The NPPA is a 501(c)(6) organization.

== Notable past members ==
- James Atherton, veteran news photographer who caught iconic moments through a lens in Washington D.C. for over forty years
- Marion Carpenter, first female National Press Photographer to cover Washington, D.C., the White House and travel with a U.S. President

== Advocacy ==
In August of 2019 the National Press Photographers Association and the American Society of Media Photographers filed an amicus brief in support of Jim Olive in University of Houston System vs. Jim Olive Photography, D/B/A Photolive, Inc. The brief was joined by the North American Nature Photography Association, Graphic Artists Guild, American Photographic Artists, and Professional Photographers of America. "The case began when Texas photographer Jim Olive discovered that the University of Houston was using one of his aerial photographs for marketing purposes without permission. When Olive asked the University to pay for the use, they refused and told him they were shielded from suit because of sovereign immunity, which protects state government entities from many lawsuits." After a negative ruling from a Texas appellate court Olive hopes to continue his fight.

In 2019 the Supreme Court of the United States granted certiorari in Allen v. Cooper, raising the question of whether Congress validly abrogated state sovereign immunity via the Copyright Remedy Clarification Act (CRCA) in providing remedies for authors of original expression whose federal copyrights are infringed by states. In 2015, the state government of North Carolina uploaded videos of the wreck of the Queen Anne's Revenge to its website without permission. As a result Nautilus Productions, the company documenting the recovery since 1998, filed suit in federal court over copyright violations and the passage of "Blackbeard's Law" by the North Carolina legislature. Before posting the videos the North Carolina Legislature passed "Blackbeard's Law", N.C. Gen Stat §121-25(b), which stated, "All photographs, video recordings, or other documentary materials of a derelict vessel or shipwreck or its contents, relics, artifacts, or historic materials in the custody of any agency of North Carolina government or its subdivisions shall be a public record pursuant to Chapter 132 of the General Statutes." Thirteen amici including; the United States Chamber of Commerce, the Recording Industry Association of America, the Copyright Alliance, the Software and Information Industry Association and the National Press Photographers Association, filed briefs in support of Allen. Those briefs proposed various doctrines under which the CRCA could validly abrogate sovereign immunity and variously re-asserted and supported the reasons why Congress examined and enacted CRCA, claiming that Congress was fair in finding that states had abused immunity and that an alternative remedy was needed. On November 5, 2019 the United States Supreme Court heard oral arguments in Allen v. Cooper. On March 23, 2020, the Supreme Court of the United States issued an opinion in Allen v. Cooper, holding that Congress had no Constitutional authority to abrogate state sovereign immunity via the Copyright Remedy Clarification Act. In other words, the CRCA is unconstitutional. Congress failed to provide evidence to support the need to abrogate sovereign immunity.

Following the ruling, Senators Thom Tillis (R-North Carolina) and Patrick Leahy (D-Vermont), of the intellectual property subcommittee on the Senate Judiciary Committee, sent letters to the U.S. Copyright Office and the U.S. Patent and Trademark Office requesting a study detailing copyright infringements by state governments. The United States Copyright Office gave intellectual property owners suffering infringement by state entities until August 3, 2020 to publicly comment as part of this inquiry. In September of 2020 the U.S. Copyright Office began publishing those comments which reflect hundreds of copyright violations by state entities.

As a result of the ruling Nautilus filed a motion for reconsideration in the United States District Court for the Eastern District of North Carolina. On August 18, 2021 Judge Terrence Boyle granted the motion for reconsideration which North Carolina promptly appealed to the United States Court of Appeals for the Fourth Circuit. The 4th Circuit denied the state's motion on October 14, 2022. Nautilus then filed their second amended complaint on February 8, 2023 alleging 5th and 14th Amendment violations of Nautilus' constitutional rights, additional copyright violations, and claiming that North Carolina's "Blackbeard's Law" represents a Bill of Attainder.

Eight years after the passage of Blackbeard's Law, on June 30, 2023, North Carolina Gov. Roy Cooper signed a bill repealing the law.
