= North American Nature Photography Association =

- Trade name: NANPA (1994-present)
- Founded: 1994; United States
- Headquarters: Illinois, United States
- Revenue: 382,468 United States dollar (2022)
- Total assets: 409,644 United States dollar (2022)
- Website: www.nanpa.org

The North American Nature Photography Association or NANPA is an organization dedicated to photography of nature. The association's headquarters were originally in Wheat Ridge, Colorado, and now are in Alma, Illinois. Established in 1994, NANPA joined forces with ASMP (American Society of Media Photographers) at the end of 2022. Together, the two organizations have about 6,500 members in North America and internationally. Several categories of membership are available, including discounts for students. The association annually sponsors a variety of activities. Among them are regional events, nature photo competitions, and webinars throughout the United States. NANPA sponsored a Nature Photography Celebration in 2018 (Jackson, Wyoming). The NANPA Foundation, established in 1997, funds scholarships, photo blinds for wildlife photography, and grants for conservation photography projects, and to photography students. NANPA also markets books of interest to members, including those by members, through Amazon.com.

NANPA's Summits, begun in 1995, bring together nature photography professionals from throughout the continent and internationally. Recent Summits were held in Jacksonville, Florida (2013 and 2017); San Diego, California (2015); and Las Vegas, Nevada (2019). The 2021 and 2022 Summits were conducted virtually. Then in 2023, the Summit was held in Tucson, Arizona; it is scheduled to return to that city in 2025. Each Summit features major presentations by distinguished people in the nature photography profession, an awards celebration, a trade show, portfolio reviews, workshops (breakout sessions), and vendor demonstrations. Lightning talks are featured at some Summits: a series of six-minute presentations by NANPA members on techniques, anecdotes, and related information.

In 2006, NANPA initiated June 15 as Nature Photography Day. This designated day was spearheaded by the association's History Committee. Its purpose is to promote the art and science of nature photography. NANPA looks to aesthetic elements and practical ones, too. Photography has been used to rescue animals, plants, and habitats locally and worldwide. Participation in Nature Photography Day has since extended globally. June 15 is a day for exploring, with a camera, the natural world within walking, hiking, biking, or rowing distance. Settings could be close by, for safety of participants and to avoid leaving a carbon footprint. Among the numerous ways to celebrate the day is to experiment with taking photographs of a familiar subject, turning the ordinary into something extraordinary. Another is to find something that detracts from nature, showing images about how human beings sometimes adversely affect the environment. NANPA also encourages people of all ages to learn about the experiences of nature photographers—legends of the past and today.

== Advocacy ==
In August 2019, the National Press Photographers Association and the American Society of Media Photographers filed an amicus brief in support of Jim Olive in University of Houston System vs. Jim Olive Photography, D/B/A Photolive, Inc. The brief was joined by the North American Nature Photography Association, Graphic Artists Guild, American Photographic Artists, and Professional Photographers of America. "The case began when Texas photographer Jim Olive discovered that the University of Houston was using one of his aerial photographs for marketing purposes without permission. When Olive asked the University to pay for the use, they refused and told him they were shielded from suit because of sovereign immunity, which protects state government entities from many lawsuits." After a negative ruling from a Texas appellate court Olive hopes to continue his fight.

In 2019, the Supreme Court of the United States granted certiorari in Allen v. Cooper, raising the question of whether Congress validly abrogated state sovereign immunity via the Copyright Remedy Clarification Act in providing remedies for authors of original expression whose federal copyrights are infringed by states. Thirteen amici including; the United States Chamber of Commerce, the Recording Industry Association of America, the Copyright Alliance, the Software and Information Industry Association, the North American Nature Photography Association and the National Press Photographers Association, filed briefs in support of Allen. Those briefs proposed various doctrines under which the CRCA could validly abrogate sovereign immunity and variously re-asserted and supported the reasons why Congress examined and enacted CRCA, claiming that Congress was fair in finding that states had abused immunity and that an alternative remedy was needed.

On March 23, 2020, the Supreme Court struck down the CRCA as unconstitutional, holding that Congress had no Constitutional authority to abrogate state sovereign immunity via the Copyright Remedy Clarification Act. Congress failed to provide evidence to support the need to abrogate sovereign immunity.
