= Copyright Alliance =

U.S. nonprofit organization

- Formation: May 17, 2007
- Type: 501(c)(4) nonprofit organization
- Purpose: copyright education and advocacy
- Location: Washington, D.C.
- CEO: Keith Kupferschmid
- Website: copyrightalliance.org

The Copyright Alliance is a nonprofit, nonpartisan 501(c)(4) organization representing artistic creators across a broad range of artistic disciplines.

The Copyright Alliance's institutional members include more than sixty trade organizations, associations, unions, companies, and guilds, that represent millions of individual creators. The organization directly collaborates with and represents more than twenty three thousand creative individuals and small businesses. The creative industries represented include writers, composers, recording artists, journalists, documentarians, filmmakers, graphic artists, visual artists, photographers, authors, software developers, and numerous other genres.

== History ==
At its launch in May 2007, the Copyright Alliance was founded by four Board members, the American Society of Composers, Authors and Publishers (ASCAP), Broadcast Music, Inc.. (BMI), the Motion Picture Association of America (now called the Motion Picture Association, or MPA), and Universal (now NBC Universal). It was initially created and masterminded by President and CEO of the Motion Picture Association Jack Valenti. Music artists Steve Cropper and Lamont Dozier attended the launch, which included a membership of 29 organizations that represented 11 million creative workers, including the Association of American Publishers (AAP), Microsoft, the Recording Industry Association of America (RIAA), Viacom, and Disney.

The launch of the Copyright Alliance was supported by U.S. House of Representatives Judiciary Committee Chairman John Conyers (D-MI), Ranking Representative Howard Coble (R-NC), Representative Howard Berman (D-CA), and members of the United States House Judiciary Subcommittee on Intellectual Property, Competition, and the Internet. In speaking of being inspired by the late Jack Valenti, Representative Berman noted that "the constant assaults on copyright law" resulted in the Copyright Alliance’s origin, and he called the organization’s launch "a tremendous idea.”

The Copyright Alliance was launched in opposition to the Digital Freedom Campaign, formed the previous October, whose members included the Consumer Electronics Association, Public Knowledge, and the Electronic Freedom Foundation.

Patrick Ross served as the initial executive director of the Copyright Alliance for four years until he was succeeded by Sandra Aistars on December 20, 2010. Prior to taking the position, Aistars was Vice President and Associate General Counsel at Time Warner. On September 15, 2015, it was announced that Keith Kupferschmid would succeed Sandra Aistars as CEO of the Copyright Alliance. Kupferschmid previously served as General Counsel and Senior Vice President for Intellectual Property at the Software and Information Industry Association (SIIA).

== Members ==
As of August 2025, the Copyright Alliance lists 52 organizations as organization members.

Trade associations

- American Association of Independent Music
- Association of American Publishers
- Entertainment Software Association
- Global Music Rights
- Motion Picture Association
- Music Arts Coalition
- Music Creators North America
- National Association of Realtors
- National Fire Protection Association
- National Music Publishers' Association
- News Media Alliance
- North American Nature Photography Association
- Picture Licensing Universal System
- Professional Photographers of America
- Recording Industry Association of America
- Society of Composers & Lyricists
- Software and Information Industry Association
- Songwriters of North America
- International Association of Scientific, Technical & Medical Publishers

Trade unions

- American Intellectual Property Law Association
- American Federation of Musicians
- American Photographic Artists
- American Society for Collective Rights Licensing
- American Society of Media Photographers
- Authors Guild
- Copyright Clearance Center
- Directors Guild of America
- Digital Media Licensing Association
- Graphic Artists Guild
- International Alliance of Theatrical Stage Employees
- National Press Photographers Association
- Recording Academy
- Screen Actors Guild—American Federation of Television and Radio Artists
- Songwriters Guild of America

Copyright collection societies

- American Society of Composers, Authors and Publishers
- Artists Rights Alliance
- Artists Rights Society
- BMI
- SESAC
- SoundExchange

Media companies

- Advance
- Disney
- Getty Images
- NBCUniversal
- NewsCorp
- The New York Times
- RELX
- Rightsify
- Sony Pictures
- Warner Bros. Discovery
- Thomson Reuters
- Universal Music Group
- Paramount

Tech companies

- Adobe
- Oracle

Sports organizations

- National Basketball Association
- Ultimate Fighting Championship

Apparel

- Nike

Constituent

- American National Standards Institute
- International Code Council

Associate Members

- National Association of Broadcasters
- Plus
- RightsClick

== Activities ==
In 2009, the organization presented a letter to the White House asking it to pursue policies supportive of artists' rights signed by 11,000 artists and creators. Over the years, the Copyright Alliance has collaborated with numerous groups and organizations. In 2014, it helped the US Copyright Office present its 2014 World IP Day program That same year, it also hosted a briefing on Capitol Hill with the Creative Rights Caucus to "discuss the challenges photographers and visual artists face in the internet age." In addition, the Copyright Alliance has worked with groups such as Google, Yahoo, and Public Knowledge to develop voluntary best practices for addressing online copyright infringement.

In June 2025, the Copyright Alliance launched a Strong IP, Strong AI grassroots campaign. The campaign was designed to rally creators to protect American innovation and ensure America doesn’t squander its strategic edge in highly valuable and sought-after copyrighted works used as training materials. The campaign was also designed to ensure that the U.S. avoids costly shortcuts that could undermine America’s own resources and provide a free pass to foreign competitors.

=== Advocacy ===
The Copyright Alliance filed briefs in Allen v. Cooper, which was decided in 2020: the Supreme Court of the United States abrogated the Copyright Remedy Clarification Act as unconstitutional, and the Copyright Alliance had argued the opposite view.

== Political issues ==
The Copyright Alliance supported an PRO-IP bill establishing a "copyright czar" in June 2008 Senate Judiciary Committee hearings. The PRO-IP bill was introduced in the Senate shortly thereafter and passed into law. Ars Technica called the bill a victory for "Big Content," though a provision for the Department of Justice to join suits for the benefit of copyright holders was stripped from the bill.

On November 16, 2009, the Copyright Alliance was joined by some of its independent creator members in hand-delivering a letter to the White House signed by more than 11,000 artists and creators, calling on President Barack Obama and Vice President Joe Biden to defend the rights of artists and creators.

In May 2009, it launched the Creators Across America campaign, which included videos of artists and creators across the United States speaking about their arts and their rights under copyright law.

The Copyright Alliance received $600,000 from the Motion Picture Association (MPA) in 2012. That year, it donated $475,000 to the Center for Copyright Information and $100,000 each to the Democratic Governors Association and Republican Governors Association as part of an anti-piracy campaign.

The Copyright Alliance also supports the Music Modernization Act (MMA), which was entered into law in 2018; and the Copyright Alternative in Small-Claims Enforcement Act of 2019 (the CASE Act).

The organization also supports the responsible development of artificial intelligence (AI) technologies.

== See also ==
- Copyleft
- Creative Commons
- Fair use
- Free-culture movement
- Intellectual property
- Copyright Remedy Clarification Act
