= APBA presents: Baseball for Windows =

1993 video game

- Developer: Miller Associates
- Publisher: Miller Associates
- Platform: Windows
- Release: 1993
- Genre: Sports

APBA presents: Baseball for Windows is a 1993 video game developed and published by New Canaan, Connecticut-based company Miller Associates.

== Gameplay ==
APBA Baseball for Windows presents a baseball simulation built around continuous audio play‑by‑play commentary delivered by Ernie Harwell, whose narration provides player names, team names, city names, starting lineups, pitcher statistics, scoring details, and real‑time updates on events such as home runs, RBIs, and changes in the game state. A text box can display the same commentary slightly ahead of the audio, and the program integrates sound effects including crowd reactions, stadium ambience, and vendor calls. The game records statistical outcomes such as saves, wins, losses, RBIs, and sacrifices, and it allows players to import additional athletes from the included sample of the Bill James Baseball Encyclopedia. The program is composed of multiple linked Windows modules through which players can organize leagues, import players, and assign lineups and pitching rotations for computer‑controlled teams. The main game screen provides information during play, while the audio commentary and statistical systems drive the simulation's presentation.

== Reception ==
Reception

Review scores
Publication	Score
Computer Gaming World	2.5/5
Electronic Entertainment	10/10
PC Gamer	90%

PC Gamer recommended APBA presents: Baseball for Windows to baseball fans. Computer Gaming World called it an excellent addition to any stat-fan's software library.

APBA presents: Baseball for Windows was a finalist in the Best Sports Program category in the 1996 CODiE Awards.
