= Queen Anne's Revenge =

Pirate Blackbeard's ship

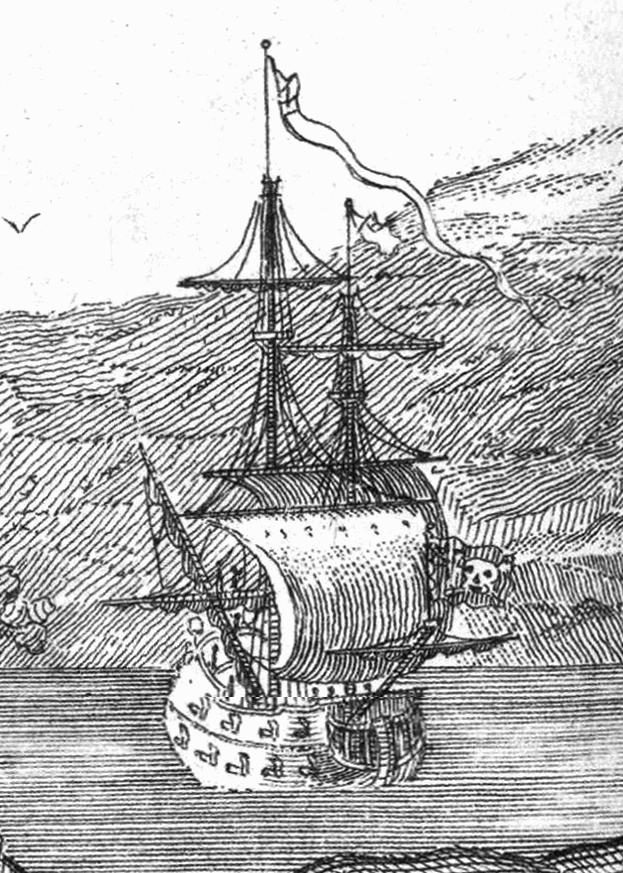
- Illustration published in 1736

France
- Name: La Concorde
- Namesake: French "concord", "harmony"
- Launched: c. 1710
- Captured: Martinique, 28 November 1717

Pirates
- Name: Queen Anne's Revenge
- Namesake: Anne, Queen of Great Britain
- Fate: Ran aground on 10 June 1718 near Beaufort Inlet, North Carolina

General characteristics
- Class & type: Frigate
- Tons burthen: 200 bm
- Length: 103 ft (31.4 m)
- Beam: 24.6 ft (7.5 m)
- Sail plan: Full-rigged
- Complement: up to 300 in Blackbeard's service
- Armament: 40 cannons (alleged), 30 found
- Queen Anne's Revenge
- U.S. National Register of Historic Places
- Location within North Carolina Location within the United States
- Nearest city: Atlantic Beach, North Carolina
- Area: less than one acre
- Built: c. 1710; 316 years ago
- NRHP reference No.: 04000148
- Added to NRHP: 9 March 2004

Queen Anne's Revenge was an early-18th-century ship, most famously used as a flagship by Edward Teach, better known as Blackbeard. The date and place of the ship's construction are uncertain, and there is no record of her actions prior to 1710 when she was operating as a French privateer as La Concorde. Surviving features of the ship's construction strongly suggest she was built by French shipwrights, based on differences in fastening patterns in the late 17th and early 18th centuries. After several years of French service, both as a naval frigate and as a merchant vessel – much of that time as a slave ship – she was captured by Blackbeard in 1717. Blackbeard used the ship for less than a year, but captured numerous prizes using her as his flagship.

In May 1718, Blackbeard ran the ship aground at Topsail Inlet, now known as Beaufort Inlet, in present-day Carteret County. After the grounding, her crew and supplies were transferred to smaller ships. In 1996, Intersal Inc., a private firm, discovered the remains of a vessel that was later determined to be Queen Anne's Revenge, which was added to the U.S. National Register of Historic Places.

== History ==
The ship that would be known as Queen Anne's Revenge was a 200-ton vessel believed to have been built in 1710. She was handed over to René Duguay-Trouin and employed in his service for some time before being converted into a slave ship, then operated by the leading slave trader René Montaudin of Nantes, until sold in 1713 in Peru or Chile. She was briefly re-acquired by the French Navy in November 1716, but was sold by them for commerce five months later in France, again for use as a slaver. She was captured by Blackbeard and his pirates on 28 November 1717, near the island of Martinique in the West Indies.

After selling her cargo of slaves at Martinique, Blackbeard made the vessel his flagship, added more heavy cannons and renamed her Queen Anne's Revenge. The name may have come from the War of the Spanish Succession, known in the Americas as Queen Anne's War, in which Blackbeard may have served in the Royal Navy, or possibly from sympathy for the Jacobite cause (Queen Anne being the last Stuart monarch). Blackbeard sailed this ship from the west coast of Africa to the Caribbean, attacking British, Dutch, and Portuguese merchant ships along the way.

Shortly after blockading Charleston harbor in May 1718, and refusing to accept Governor Robert Johnson's offer of the King's Pardon, Blackbeard ran Queen Anne's Revenge aground while entering Beaufort Inlet, North Carolina, on 10 June 1718. A deposition given by David Herriot, the former captain of the sloop Adventure, states "Thatch's [Teach's] ship Queen Anne's Revenge run a-ground off of the Bar of Topsail-Inlet." He also states that Adventure "run a-ground likewise about Gun-shot from the said Thatch" in an attempt to kedge Queen Anne's Revenge off the bar. Blackbeard then disbanded his flotilla and escaped by transferring supplies onto the smaller Adventure. He stranded several crew members on a small island nearby, where they were later rescued by Captain Stede Bonnet. Some suggest Blackbeard deliberately grounded the ship as an excuse to disperse the crew. Shortly afterward, he surrendered and accepted the King's Pardon for himself and his remaining crewmen from Governor Charles Eden at Bath, North Carolina. However, Blackbeard returned to piracy later that year and was killed in combat in November 1718.

== Discovery and excavation ==
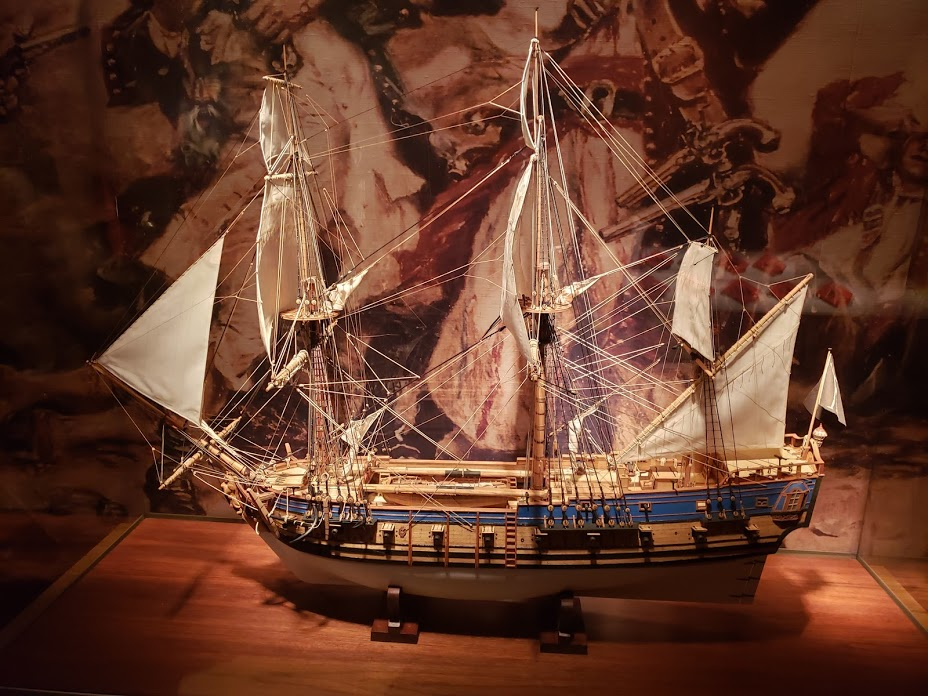
Model of the Queen Anne's Revenge in the North Carolina Museum of History

Intersal Inc., a private research firm, discovered the wreck believed to be Queen Anne's Revenge on 21 November 1996. It was located by Intersal's director of operations, Mike Daniel, who used historical research provided by the company's president, Phil Masters and maritime archaeologist David Moore. The shipwreck lies in 28 feet (8.5 m) of water about one mile (1.6 km) offshore of Fort Macon State Park (34°41′44″N 76°41′20″W), Atlantic Beach, North Carolina. On 3 March 1997, Jim Hunt, the governor of North Carolina, held a press conference in Raleigh, North Carolina. He stated: "The state of North Carolina is working to protect the site and will do everything we can to that end. We look forward to the day when all North Carolinians can see these exciting artifacts for themselves." Thirty cannons have been identified to date and more than 300,000 artifacts have been recovered. The cannons are of different origins including Sweden and England, and of different sizes as would be expected with a colonial pirate crew.

For one week in 2000 and 2001, live underwater video of the project was webcast to the Internet as a part of the QAR DiveLive educational program that reached thousands of children around the world. Created and co-produced by Nautilus Productions and Marine Grafics, this project enabled students to talk to scientists and learn about methods and technologies utilized by the underwater archaeology team.

In November 2006 and 2007, more artifacts were discovered at the site and brought to the surface. The additional artifacts appear to support the claim that the wreck is that of Queen Anne's Revenge. Among evidence to support this theory is that the cannons were found loaded. In addition, there were more cannons than would be expected for a ship of this size, and the cannons were of different makes. Depth markings on the part of the stern that was recovered point to it having been made according to the French foot measurements. Markings found on a cannon and a bronze bell are engraved with dates prior to 1718, further supporting that the wreck is Queen Anne's Revenge.

By the end of 2007, approximately one third of the wreck was fully excavated. Part of the hull of the ship, including much of the keel and part of the stern post, has survived. The 1,500-pound (680 kg) stern post was recovered in November 2007. The NCDNCR set up the website Queen Anne's Revenge to build on intense public interest in the finds. Artifacts recovered in 2008 include loose ceramic and pewter fragments, lead strainer fragments, a nesting weight, cannon apron, ballast stones, a sword guard and a coin.

Goals during the 2010 field season included staging of one of the ship's largest main deck cannons to the large artifact holding area on site, taking corrosion readings from anchors and cannons undergoing in situ corrosion treatment, attaching aluminum-alloy anodes to the remaining anchors and cannons so as to begin their in situ corrosion treatment and continuing site excavations.

In 2011, the 0.9-tonne (2,000 lb) anchor from the ship was brought to the surface, along with a range of makeshift weaponry including langrage or canister shot.

On 29 August 2011, the National Geographic Society reported that the State of North Carolina had confirmed the shipwreck as Queen Anne's Revenge, reversing a conclusion previously maintained because of a lack of conclusive evidence. Specific artifacts that support this conclusion include a brass coin weight bearing the bust of Queen Anne of Great Britain, cast during her reign (1702–1714); the stem of a wine glass decorated with diamonds and tiny embossed crowns, made to commemorate the 1714 coronation of Queen Anne's successor, King George I; the remains of a French hunting sword featuring a bust that closely resembles King Louis XV, who claimed the French throne in 1715; and a urethral syringe for treating venereal diseases with a control mark indicating manufacture between 1707 and 1715 in Paris, France.

On 21 June 2013, the National Geographic Society reported recovery of two cannons from Queen Anne's Revenge. Several months later, on 28 October, archaeologists recovered five more cannons from the wreck.

The 23rd of 30 cannons identified at the wreck site was recovered on 24 October 2014. The gun is approximately 56 inches (140 cm) long, weighs over 300 pounds (140 kg) and may be a sister to a Swedish gun that was previously recovered. Nine cannonballs, bar shot halves, an iron bolt and a grenado were also recovered during the 2014 field season.

In January 2018, sixteen fragments of paper were identified after being recovered from sludge inside a cannon. The scraps were from a copy of the book A Voyage to the South Sea, and Round the World, Perform'd in the Years 1708, 1709, 1710 and 1711 by Captain Edward Cooke, in which Cooke travels under Woodes Rogers; it is likely the pages were torn from the book and used as wadding in that cannon. A portion of the objects and artifacts found at the shipwreck have been given on long-term loan to the Smithsonian and are on display in the National Museum of American History. Additionally, some artifacts have been loaned to the Musée national de la Marine in Paris.

In total, 24 of 30 known cannons have been excavated. Of these, six cast-iron cannons bear founder's marks or proof marks indicative of a specific nation of origin. One 1/2-pounder carries an English proof mark, a 4-pounder carries an English proof mark and the founder's mark for Major John Fuller (1652–1722) of the Heathfield Furnace in East Sussex, and four 1-pounders carry founder's markings for Jesper Eliaeson Ehrencreutz at Ehrendals works in Södermanland, Sweden. Two of the Ehrendal cannons also carry legible date marks for 1713. Although there are thirty known cannons from the wreck, it is estimated that Blackbeard added around forty cannons, all in varying sizes.

== Ownership and legal controversies ==
Recognizing the significance of Queen Anne's Revenge, the North Carolina Department of Natural and Cultural Resources (NCDNCR), Intersal, and Maritime Research Institute (MRI) entered into a memorandum of agreement in 1998. Intersal agreed to forgo entitlement to any coins and precious metals recovered from the wreck site in order that all artifacts remain as one intact collection, and in order for NCDNCR to determine the ultimate disposition of the artifacts. In return, Intersal was granted media, replica, and other rights related to an entity known as Blackbeard's Queen Anne's Revenge Shipwreck Project; MRI was granted joint artifact touring rights with NCDNCR, Intersal, and Rick Allen of Nautilus Productions signed a settlement agreement on 24 October 2013, connected to commercial, replica, and promotional opportunities for the benefit of Queen Anne's Revenge. The State of North Carolina owns the wreck since it lies in state waters (within the three-mile limit).

Archaeological recovery ceased on the shipwreck after the 2015 season because of lawsuits filed against the State of North Carolina, the NCDNCR, and the Friends of the Queen Anne's Revenge nonprofit. Intersal, which discovered the Queen Anne's Revenge, filed suit in state court over contract violations. In a unanimous decision on 2 November 2019, the North Carolina Supreme Court affirmed Intersal's complaint and voted to send the lawsuit back to complex business court for reconsideration. On 23 February 2023 the judge in the case issued a ruling in favor of Intersal which granted them permission to proceed to a jury trial sometime in 2024.

In 2013 and 2015, the state government of North Carolina uploaded videos of the wreck of the Queen Anne's Revenge to its website without permission. As a result, Nautilus Productions, the company documenting the recovery since 1998, filed suit in federal court over copyright violations and the passage of "Blackbeard's Law" by the North Carolina legislature. Before posting the videos the North Carolina Legislature passed "Blackbeard's Law", N.C. General Statute §121-25(b), which stated, "All photographs, video recordings, or other documentary materials of a derelict vessel or shipwreck or its contents, relics, artifacts, or historic materials in the custody of any agency of North Carolina government or its subdivisions shall be a public record pursuant to Chapter 132 of the General Statutes."

On 5 November 2019, the U.S. Supreme Court heard oral arguments in Allen v. Cooper. On 23 March 2020, the Supreme Court ruled in favor of North Carolina and struck down the Copyright Remedy Clarification Act, which Congress passed in 1989 to attempt to curb such infringements of copyright by states.

After the ruling, Nautilus filed a motion for reconsideration in the United States District Court for the Eastern District of North Carolina. On 18 August 2021 Judge Terrence Boyle granted the motion for reconsideration which North Carolina promptly appealed to the United States Court of Appeals for the Fourth Circuit. The 4th Circuit denied the state's motion on 14 October 2022. Nautilus then filed their second amended complaint on 8 February 2023 alleging 5th and 14th Amendment violations of Nautilus' constitutional rights, additional copyright violations, and claiming that North Carolina's "Blackbeard's Law" represents a Bill of Attainder. Eight years after the passage of Blackbeard's Law, on 30 June 2023, North Carolina Gov. Roy Cooper signed a bill repealing the law.

Intersal, Inc.'s lawsuit continues in the North Carolina Business Court with a trial date set for 4 November 2024. Possible damages in the case could run from $15.6 million to $259.3 million.

== National Register of Historic Places ==
Queen Anne's Revenge was added to the National Register of Historic Places in 2004. The reference number is 04000148. It is listed as owned by the State of North Carolina and located South of Beaufort Inlet, N.C. The wreck site is designated 31CR314 by the state of North Carolina.

== See also ==
- Robert Lane (pirate), whose ship was also named Queen Anne's Revenge
