= EPSON International Pano Awards =

Photography award

The International Pano Awards (also known as The EPSON International Pano Awards for sponsorship reasons) are an annual set of awards presented by EPSON Australia to recognise and honour the professional and the amateur photographers for their excellent work in the genre of panoramic photography. it is often described as the "world's largest panoramic photography competition".

== History ==
In 2009, David Evans created The International Pano Awards with the support of Epson Australia and, launched in the following year with ESPON as its title sponsor. later, Epson Southeast Asia joined them in 2024.

The winners of the awards are selected by a panel of judges which mainly consists of eminent photographers from various countries. Jeff Mitchum, Karl Strand, Mark Handy, Mel Sinclair, Abe Blair, Juan Pablo de Miguel, Adam Williams, Anna Gibiskys, Isabella Tabacchi, Darren Moore, Thomas Erh, Aaron Spence and Bill Bailey are some notable photographers who have been part of this panel.

In 2020, it received a record 5,859 entries from 1452 professional and amateur photographers in 96 countries.

== Competition ==
The competition consists of three main sections — Open, Amateur and VR/360, both the professional and amateur photographers are free to take part in the Open & the VR/360 sections.

The judging panel for the respective section selects the best image in two sub-categories — Built and Nature, except for the VR/360 section. The individuals with the highest combined score from their three photographs, all of which must place in the top-50 and at least one in the top-10, are declared the overall winners in the open and amateur sections. The other awards are judged according to the type of image such as stitched, aerial and vertical images. Additionally, It publishes a list of the top-50 photographs of Nature and Build categories in both the Open & the Amateur sections.

== Past recipients ==
=== Main awards ===
Year	Open Awards			Amateur Awards			VR/360 Award
Year	Overall	Built Category	Nature Category	Overall	Built Category	Nature Category	VR/360 Award
2010	Bill Leigh Brewer (USA)	Bill Leigh Brewer (USA)	Roy Samulsen (Norway)	Cynthia Hedgecock (USA)	Bernhard Hartmann (Denmark)	Cynthia Hedgecock (USA)	Not awarded
2011	Oleg Gaponyuk (Russia)	Oleg Gaponyuk (Russia)	Sussanne Weissenberger (USA)	Bo Struye (USA)	Bo Struye (USA)	Christian Baeuchle (Denmark)	Ignacio Ferrando (Spain)
2012	Craig Bill (USA)	Peter Blakeman (Australia)	Craig Bill (USA)	Sergey Semenov (Russia)	Sergey Semenov (Russia)	Anita Erdmann (Canada)	Eric Herrmann (USA)
2013	Timo Lieber (UK)	Dmitry Moiseenko (Russia)	Timo Lieber (UK)	Garry Schlatter (Australia)	Ralf Regeer (Australia)	Garry Schlatter (Australia)	Dmitry Moiseenko (Russia)
2014	Dennis Ramos (USA)	Dennis Ramos (USA)	Ben Neale (Australia)	Ben Neale (Australia)	Jesus M. Garcia (Spain)	Ben Neale (Australia)	Dmitry Moiseenko (Russia)
2015	Max Rive (Netherlands)	Darren Murray (UK)	Max Rive (Netherlands)	Mateusz Piesiak (Poland)	John Finnan (Australia)	Mateusz Piesiak (Poland)	Dmitry Moiseenko (Russia)
2016	Alex Noriega (USA)	Xose Casal (Spain)	Alex Noriega (USA)	Nicholas Roemmelt (Austria)	Andreas Paehge (Germany)	Nicholas Roemmelt (Austria)	Oleg Gaponyuk (Russia)
2017	Jesus M. Garcia (Spain)	Javier de la Torre (Spain)	Jesus M. Garcia (Spain)	Darren Moore (UK)	Darren Moore (UK)	Ray Jennings (Australia)	Oleg Gaponyuk (Russia)
2018	Veselin Atanasov (Bulgaria)	Daniel Eisele (Germany)	Veselin Atanasov (Bulgaria)	Nathaniel Merz (South Korea)	Peter Li (UK)	Nathaniel Merz (South Korea)	Oleg Gaponyuk (Russia)
2019	Mieke Boynton (Australia)	Abdulla Al-Mushaifri (Qatar)	Mieke Boynton (Australia)	Carlos F. Turienzo (Spain)	Daniel Trippolt (Austria)	Carlos F. Turienzo (Spain)	Lukasz Czech (Poland)
2020	Matt Jackisch (Canada)	Colin Leonhardt (Australia)	Matt Jackisch (Canada)	Juan Lopez Ruiz (Spain)	Juan Lopez Ruiz (Spain)	Carlos F. Turienzo (Spain)	Oleg Gaponyuk (Russia)
2021	Joshua Hermann (USA)	Mark Brierley (Australia	Joshua Hermann (USA)	Daniel Trippolt (Austria)	Florian Kriechbaumer (UAE)	Daniel Trippolt (Austria)	Oleg Gaponyuk (Russia)
2022	Jinyi He (China)	Peter Li (UK)	Jinyi He (China)	Florian Kriechbaumer (UAE)	Carlos Solinis Camalich (Spain)	Florian Kriechbaumer (UAE)	Oleg Gaponyuk (Russia)
2023	Jose D. Requelme (Spain)	Cao Ky Nhan (Vietnam)	Jose D. Requelme (Spain)	Merche Llobera (Spain)	Hung Chang Lin (Taiwan)	Merche Llobera (Spain)	Marcio Cabral (Brazil)
2024	Kelvin Yuen (Hong Kong)	Nguyen Tan Tuan (Vietnam)	Kelvin Yuen (Hong Kong)	Diego Manrique Diez (Spain)	Danny Au (Hong Kong)	Diego Manrique Diez (Spain)	Marcio Cabral (Brazil)

=== Additional awards ===
Year	Digital art Prize	Curators Award	Nikon Award	Stitched Image/Raw Planet Award
2015	Darren Moore (UK)	Not Awarded	Not Awarded	Not Awarded
2016	Marsel van Oosten (Netherlands)	Rodney Trenchard (Australia)	Not Awarded	Marsel van Oosten (Netherlands)
2017	Mads Peter Iversen (Denmark)	Nate Merz (USA)	Not Awarded	Luka Benini (Italy)
2018	Colin Sillerud (USA)	Stefan Thaler (Australia)	Not Awarded	David Thompson (UK)
2019	Mark Gray (Australia)	Simon Roppel (Switzerland)	Danny Tan (Australia)	Not Awarded
2020	Manish Mamtani (USA)	Armand Sarlangue (France)	Alan Mathieson (Australia)	Not Awarded
2021	Manuel Carmona (Spain)	Max Rive (Netherlands)	Ray Jennings (Australia)	Marsel van Oosten (Netherlands)
2022	Juan Lopez Ruiz (Spain)	Judith Kuhn (Germany)	Craig McGowan (Australia)	Joshua Hermann (USA)
2023	Swee Choo Ho (USA)	Krzysztof Browko (Poland)	Jon Vause (Australia)	Teo Chin Leong (Singapore)
2024	Nguyen Tan Tuan (Vietnam)	Tom Putt (Australia)	Michael Stringer (Australia)	Nickolas Warner (USA)

=== Special awards ===
Year	Highest Scoring Image Awards					Highest Scoring Member Awards	
Year	Aerial Image	Smartphone Pano	Film Capture	Vertical Image	Gigapixel image	IAPP Member	IVRPA Member
2011	Not awarded	Not awarded	Not awarded	Not awarded	Not awarded	Denis Tremblay (Canada)	Ignacio Ferrando (Spain)
2013	Not awarded	Not awarded	Jorze Sanchez (USA)	Not awarded	Chris Collacott (Canada)	Adrien Huang (USA)	Thomas Erh (Brazil)
2014	Not awarded	Not awarded	Doglas Peebles (USA)	Not awarded	Alexander Vershinin (Russia)	Denis Gadbois (Canada)	Christoph Simon (UK)
2015	Dmitry Moiseenko (Russia)	Not awarded	Yuri Pustovoy (Russia)	Not awarded	Wojciech Kruczynski (Poland)	Dennis Ramos (USA)	Gregor Polster (Germany)
2016	Hans Strand (Switzerland)	Not awarded	Jason Denning (UK)	Ivan Turukhano (Russia)	Anique Ahmed (UAE)	Laurent Lacroix (Spain)	Markus Matern (Germany)
2017	Javier de la Torre (Spain)	Not awarded	Akira Matsui (Japan)	Mads Peter Iversen (Denmark)	Not awarded	Marcio Cabral (Brazil)	
2018	Kevin Krautgartner (Germany); Zay Yar Lin (Myanmar)	Not awarded	Zay Yar Lin (Myanmar)	Peter Li (UK)	Isabella Tabacchi (Italy)	Marcio Cabral (Brazil)	Yuqing Guo (China)
2019	Mienke Boynton (Australia)	Roberto Soares-Gomes (Brazil)	David Tacon (Australia)	Jesus M. Chamizo (Spain)	Dieter Meyrl (Germany)	Yoshihiko Wada (Japan)	Sergey Semenov (Russia)
2020	Manish Mamtani (USA)	Tyler Lekki (USA)	Not Awarded	Muhammad Rahman (Australia	Jason Denning (UK)	Blake Randall (Canada)	Pietro Madaschi (Italy)
2021	Gheorghe Popa (Romania)	Andrew Dickman (Australia)	Oliver Wehrli (Switzerland)	Peter Harrison (Australia)	Yaz Loukhal (Switzerland)	Tom Sheckels (USA)	Peter van den Wyngaert (Belgium)
2022	Jinyi He (China)	William Lekki (USA)	Rainer Roth (Switzerland)	Peter Li (UK)	Jinyi He (China)	Elliot McGucken (USA)	Bin Sun (China)
2023	Spencer Cox (USA)	Chang Di (Taiwan)	Michael Lees (USA)	Shuchuan Liu (China)	Marek Biegalski (Poland)	Blake Randall (Canada)	Obed Garcia (Spain)
2024	Kelvin Yuen (Hong Kong)	Shuchuan Liu (China)	Oliver Wehrli (Switzerland)	Yuan Yukan (China)	Ethan Su (Taiwan)	Elliot McGucken (USA)	Peter van den Wyngaert (Belgium)
