= Graphic Artists Guild =

American entertainment industry union

The Graphic Artists Guild
- Graphic Artists Guild, Inc.
- Graphic Artists Guild
- Founded: November, 1967
- Headquarters: New York, New York, United States
- Location: United States
- Members: under 2,000
- Key people: Delanie West, Advocacy Liaison
- Affiliations: Icograda
- Website: www.graphicartistsguild.org

The Graphic Artists Guild is a guild of graphic designers, illustrators, and photographers and is organized into seven chapters around the United States. It is a member of the international organization Icograda.

== History ==
In the mid-1960s most automobile advertising contained illustrations, not photographs. Many of the illustrators who worked for the advertising agencies servicing the automobile industry were unhappy with their pay and working conditions. Many were members of the Society of Illustrators, but they were told that the Society did not do advocacy work. So those artists banded together to form the Guild as a union of artists. On November 2, 1967, the Graphic Artists Guild charter, based on the Screen Actors Guild constitution, was signed in Detroit, Michigan, by 113 artists. After the Detroit chapter, and the first national office (eventually located in New York City), were founded, artists organized chapters in Chicago, Illinois; Cleveland, Ohio; and San Francisco, California.

In 1970, the Detroit chapter called a strike against Campbell-Ewald, the advertising agency that serviced Chevrolet. Guild members struck for better wages and the right of Campbell-Ewald's freelance graphic artists to accept work from other clients. The strike failed when Campbell-Ewald hired scabs to break the strike. With the failure of the strike the Detroit chapter declined and the Guild's headquarters was moved to New York.

Over the years, the Guild has merged with several other artists groups, including the Illustrators Guild in 1976, the Graphic Artists for Self-Preservation and the Creative Designers Guild in 1978, the Textile Designers Guild in 1979, the Cartoonist Guild in 1984, the Coalition of Designers in 1987, and the Society of Professional Graphic Artists in Seattle became the Guild’s Seattle chapter in 1993.

In December 2008, the Guild sued the Illustrators Partnership of America and five individuals for libel regarding what the Guild considered defamatory public comments in connection with the IPA's effort to form a separate illustrators rights-collecting society with 13 organizations, the American Society of Illustrators Partnership. In 2011, Judge Debra James of the Supreme Court, Civil Branch, New York County, dismissed this US$1 million-dollar tortious interference and defamation lawsuit. The Guild filed a motion to appeal.

== UAW Affiliation ==
For most of its history, the Graphic Artists Guild has been an independent union, negotiating its first collective bargaining contract for artists at the Children’s Television Workshop in 1986. In 1993 the Guild became the collective bargaining agent for the graphic artists employed at Public Broadcasting Service (PBS) primary member station, WNET. After years of negotiations with the American Federation of Teachers, Communications Workers of America, and the United Auto Workers (UAW), the Guild in 1999 voted to affiliate with the UAW, becoming Local 3030. Affecting the Guild's decision were the experiences of the National Writers Union, which had seen 50% membership growth under UAW auspices.

As Guild membership declined from 2,083 in 1999 to 1,832 in 2003, the Guild's affiliation with UAW became economically unfeasible. In 2004, a majority of the Guild members voted to disaffiliate at the end of the five-year agreement.

== Advocacy ==
In the 1970s, Guild lobbying helped sway the Copyright Royalty Tribunal to raise fees and improve reporting procedures regarding use of previously published art for PBS and its affiliate stations.

In 1979, the Guild began a long-term campaign to stop work-for-hire contracts, where the art buyer assumes control over a freelance artist's work. A 1989 Supreme Court decision, Community for Creative Non-Violence v. Reid, followed the Guild's position to rule that a company obtaining the services of a freelancer cannot compel a work-for-hire situation, or assume one is in place, unless both parties sign a written contract agreeing to such an arrangement.

In 1980, the Guild represented a group of textile designers, terminated by Print-a-Pattern for trying to form a union, in an unfair labor practices action before the National Labor Relations Board.

In the early 1980s, artists' fair-practices law based on the Guild's model law were passed in California, New York, and Oregon. In response to Guild opposition, the IRS withdrew a proposed rule that would have disallowed a home studio deduction where the artist had a primary source of income at another location and from another type of work.

In 1985, the Boston chapter succeeded in passing the Arts Preservation Act in Massachusetts, which states, "No person, except an artist who owns or possesses a work of fine art which the artist has created, shall intentionally commit, or authorize the intentional commission of any physical defacement, mutilation, alteration, or destruction of a work of fine art."

Under the Tax Reform Act of 1986, writers and artists were barred from deducting expenses except in the year in which they booked the income for those expenses. The Graphic Artists Guild and 44 other artists groups successfully lobbied to have that provision repealed in 1988.

In 2002 the Northern California Chapter lobbied the state's Board of Equalization on behalf of illustrator Heather Preston. This effort resulted in a ruling that virtually exempts sales tax on all on the artwork of graphic artists.

In April 2010, the Graphic Artists Guild filed suit against Google to halt further development of the Google Books Library Project. The issue in the lawsuit is Google’s digitization of millions of books for the benefit of Google Books. The books in dispute include protected visual works, such as photographs, illustrations, and charts. Google had previous negotiated a settlement with text authors and other rights holders whose work was unlawfully digitized, but that agreement did not address the rights of visual artists.

In August 2019 the National Press Photographers Association and the American Society of Media Photographers filed an amicus brief in support of Jim Olive in University of Houston System vs. Jim Olive Photography, D/B/A Photolive, Inc. The brief was joined by the North American Nature Photography Association, Graphic Artists Guild, American Photographic Artists, and Professional Photographers of America. "The case began when Texas photographer Jim Olive discovered that the University of Houston was using one of his aerial photographs for marketing purposes without permission. When Olive asked the University to pay for the use, they refused and told him they were shielded from suit because of sovereign immunity, which protects state government entities from many lawsuits." After a negative ruling from a Texas appellate court Olive hopes to continue his fight.

In 2019 the Supreme Court of the United States granted certiorari in Allen v. Cooper, raising the question of whether Congress validly abrogated state sovereign immunity via the Copyright Remedy Clarification Act in providing remedies for authors of original expression whose federal copyrights are infringed by states. Thirteen amici including; the United States Chamber of Commerce, the Recording Industry Association of America, the Copyright Alliance, the Software and Information Industry Association, the Graphic Artists Guild and the National Press Photographers Association, filed briefs in support of Allen. Those briefs proposed various doctrines under which the CRCA could validly abrogate sovereign immunity and variously re-asserted and supported the reasons why Congress examined and enacted CRCA, claiming that Congress was fair in finding that states had abused immunity and that an alternative remedy was needed. On November 5, 2019 the United States Supreme Court heard oral arguments in Allen v. Cooper. A decision in the case is expected in the late spring of 2020.

== Publishing ==
The Graphic Artists Guild published the first edition of its Pricing & Ethical Guidelines in 1973. Pricing & Ethical Guidelines began as a 20-page pamphlet and has grown into a 400-page book.

Up through the 1990s, the Guild also published the Directory of Illustration and a Corporate and Communication Design annual.
