= Professional Photographers of America =

Photographic organization

- Established: 1868
- Type: Nonprofit
- Headquarters: Atlanta, Georgia, United States
- Region served: Worldwide
- Members: 35,000
- Website: www.ppa.com

Professional Photographers of America (PPA) is a nonprofit trade association of professional photographers. As of August 2022, PPA has 35,000 members.

== History ==
=== 19th century ===
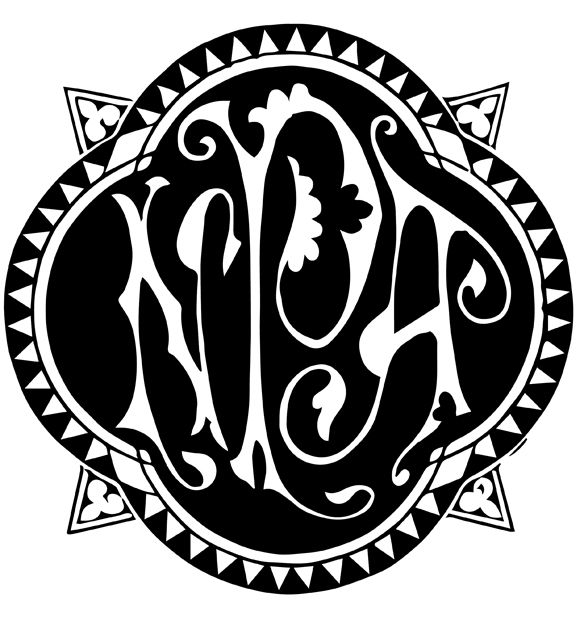
National Photographic Association logo (c. 1869)

The association began in December 1868 as the National Photographic Association of the United States (NPA). The group was against the Ambrotype patent restrictions. Although it succeeded in preventing the reissue of the patent, the executive committee of the NPA became discouraged, and the group disbanded in 1876 because of a lack of interest.

The Professional Photographers of America, as it is known today, was officially founded in April 1880 as the Photographers Association of America, Inc., by members of the Chicago Photographic Association and the former National Photographic Association. In their first meeting in April, PAA elected John Ryder from Cleveland, Ohio, as its first president. From August 23–26, 1880, 237 photographers attended PAA's first convention in Chicago. At the 1880 convention, a committee demonstrated the new gelatin dry plate imaging process. American daguerreotype pioneers also attended the early PAA conventions, including John H. Fitzgibbon. The daguerreotype, introduced in 1839–1840, was the first profitable photographic process.

=== 20th century ===
In 1909, the membership installed its first governing body, the Congress of Photography. The Congress was composed of delegates from around the country who transacted official association business. Previously, all association business had been conducted by those who happened to attend conventions, resulting in problems of organizational continuity. The Congress continued until 1929, when the National Council became the official governing body, representing 37 associations and clubs nationwide.

By 1913, the photography association had grown to 725 members, expanding to 2,272 members in 1916. When World War I began, many PAA members joined the photography section of the Signal Corps, which were made honorary PAA members through the Liberty War Section of the association after the war ended.

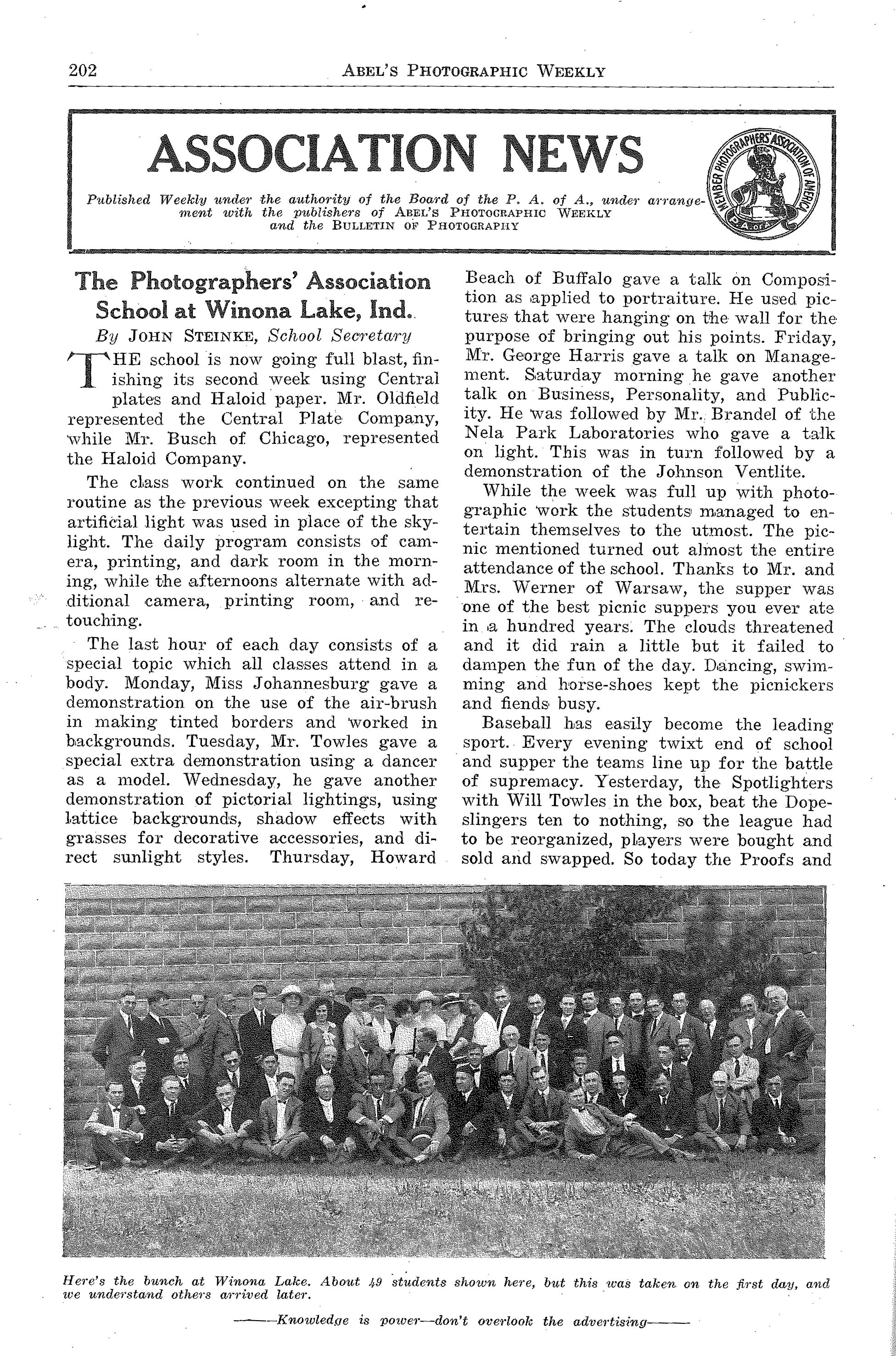
PAA newsletter from 1922

In 1921, The Daguerre Club of Indiana donated to PAA a building in Winona Lake, Indiana, to establish a photography school. The school was to become the Winona International School of Professional Photography. Winona operated classes for professional photographers each summer until 1984, when the school was relocated to its Mount Prospect, Illinois campus, where it operated until 1994 when it was relocated again to Atlanta, Georgia.

On its 50th anniversary in 1930, the Great Depression hit. From 1931 to 1934, the association suffered from cut budgets, canceled memberships, and no held conventions. By 1934, association leaders were spearheading efforts to build membership and combat price-cutting under the National Recovery Act, which was signed into law that year. They developed the Code of Fair Competition for the Photographic and Photofinishing Industry, which would require every person or firm selling photographic products or services to comply with requirements for wages, hours, prices, and trade practices. The National Recovery Act was declared unconstitutional, affecting all such codes under its jurisdiction. The association suffered a further setback when World War II erupted.

PAA offered the Directory of Professional Photography, which first appeared in 1938, and the degree program, which awarded its first Master of Photography degree in 1939.

The organization changed its name to Professional Photographers of America, Inc. in 1958 to distinguish the association from amateur photography organizations. That same year, PPA joined the Mississippi-Alabama Associated Photographers (later renamed the Professional Photographers of Mississippi-Alabama) and the University of Mississippi to hold the first conference on professional photography with joint participation from a local association, national association, and major university.

In 1993, the association moved its headquarters from Chicago to Atlanta.

=== 21st century ===
In 2001, PPA was lobbying on behalf of photographers on Capitol Hill.

In 2015, PPA acquired PhotoVision, an online educational platform that offers its member photographers educational videos.

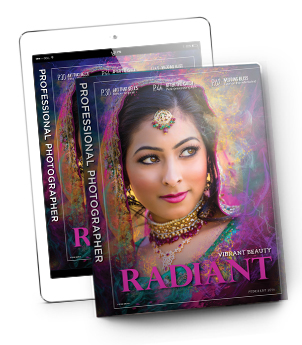
Professional Photographer magazine

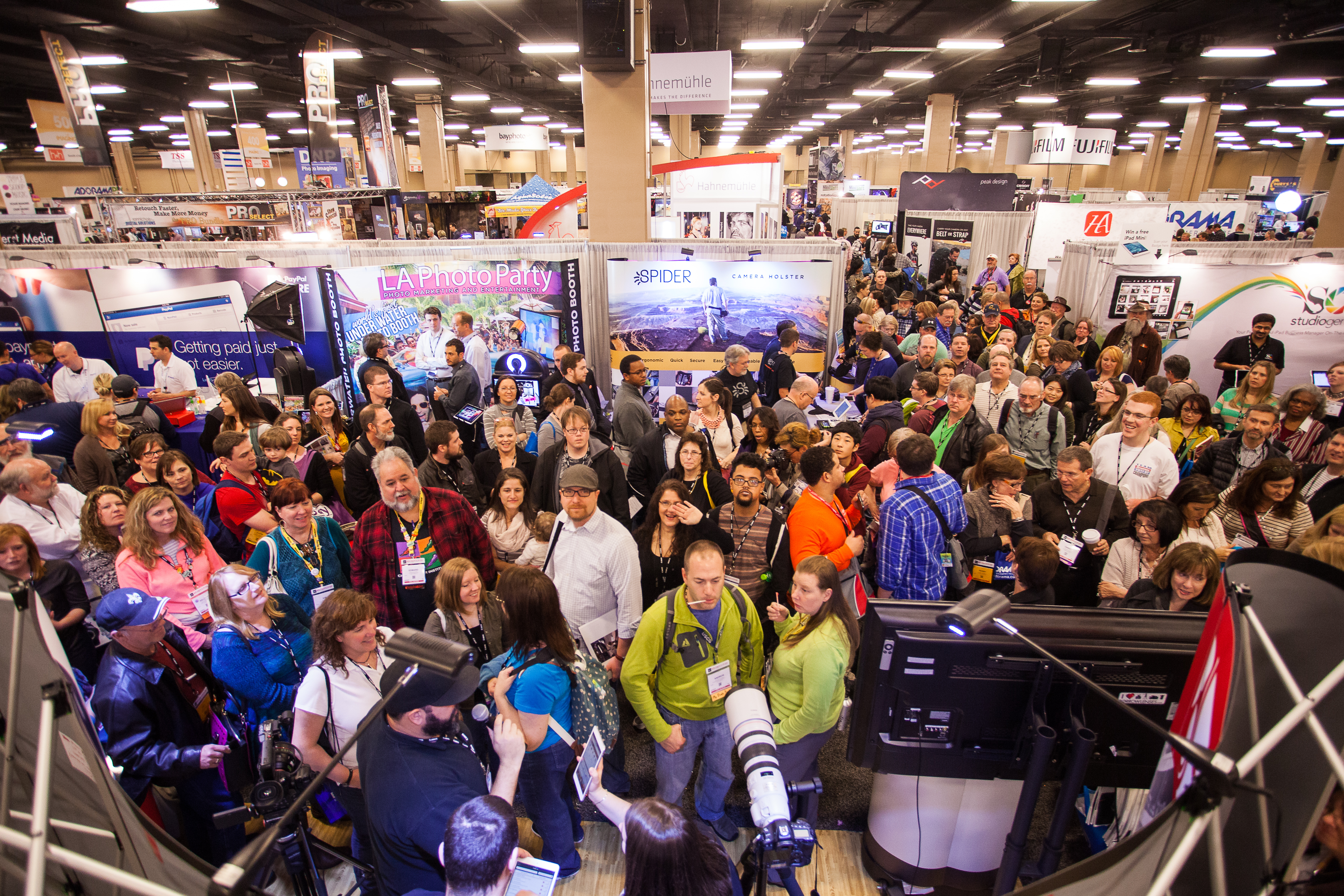
Imaging USA, 2016

== Magazine ==
PPA has published Professional Photographer magazine since 1907.

== Advocacy ==
In August 2019, the National Press Photographers Association and the American Society of Media Photographers filed an amicus brief in support of Jim Olive in University of Houston System vs. Jim Olive Photography, D/B/A Photolive, Inc. The brief was attended by the North American Nature Photography Association, the Graphic Artists Guild, American Photographic Artists, and Professional Photographers of America. "The case began when Texas photographer Jim Olive discovered that the University of Houston was using one of his aerial photographs for marketing purposes without permission. When Olive asked the University to pay for the use, they refused and told him they were shielded from suit because of sovereign immunity, which protects state government entities from many lawsuits." After a negative ruling from a Texas appellate court, Olive hopes to continue his fight.

In 2019, the Supreme Court of the United States granted certiorari in Allen v. Cooper, raising the question of whether Congress validly abrogated state sovereign immunity via the Copyright Remedy Clarification Act in providing remedies for authors of original expression whose federal copyrights are infringed by states. Thirteen amici, including the United States Chamber of Commerce, the Recording Industry Association of America, the Copyright Alliance, the Software and Information Industry Association, Professional Photographers of America, and the National Press Photographers Association, filed briefs in support of Allen. Those briefs proposed various doctrines under which the CRCA could validly abrogate sovereign immunity and variously re-asserted and supported the reasons why Congress examined and enacted CRCA, claiming that Congress was fair in finding that states had abused immunity and that an alternative remedy was needed. On November 5, 2019, the United States Supreme Court heard oral arguments in Allen v. Cooper. A decision in the case is expected in the late spring of 2020.

== See also ==
- International Association of Panoramic Photographers (IAPP)
