= American Society of Media Photographers =

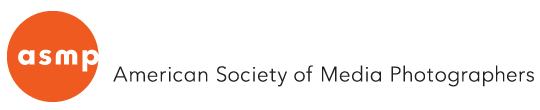
- Formation: 1944
- Type: professional association
- Headquarters: San Francisco, CA
- Location: United States
- Members: 7,000+
- Official language: English
- CEO: Thomas Maddrey
- Website: asmp.org

The American Society of Media Photographers, abbreviated ASMP, is a professional association of imaging professionals, including photojournalists, architectural, underwater, food/culinary and advertising photographers as well as video/film makers and other specialists. Its members are primarily those who create images for publications, though many cross over into wedding and portrait photography.

ASMP advocates for photographers' legal rights, supports information-sharing among members, and provides business and technical information. Much of the material is freely available to the public. For instance, it offers a web tutorial on registering copyrights, and on model releases and property releases. It also helps users of images find qualified photographers for project assignments ("Find a Photographer") and helps photographers find qualified assistants ("Find an Assistant.")

The ASMP has more than 7,000+ members in nearly 70 countries.

== History ==
In the fall of 1944, some two dozen New York photographers formed the Society of Magazine Photographers or SMP. Within a few months, though, they had to change the name to American Society of Magazine Photographers because the acronym SMP was already being used by another organization. (In 1992, recognizing that it had grown far beyond the borders of the magazine industry, the Society adopted its current name.) Their goal was to address their common problems: lack of credit lines, unauthorized reproduction of images, and uncredited copying of photographs by illustrators and artists. They also hoped to raise their rates of pay.

In the early years, a majority within the Society held the opinion that ASMP should be a labor union and bargain collectively for wages and working conditions. However, this was far from unanimous. A substantial minority wanted nothing to do with unions and saw ASMP as a professional guild along the lines of the American Bar Association or American Medical Association. During the 1950s, the issue was the cause of frequent schisms and mass resignations. The issue was laid to rest by a 1976 ruling of the National Labor Relations Board, which determined that ASMP was a group of independent contractors and, thus, ineligible to be a union.

Thereafter, ASMP focused its efforts on areas that are traditional activities of professional associations: networking, advocacy and business practices.

== Activities ==
Networking and special-interest groups

From just a couple dozen photojournalists in New York City, the Society soon expanded. Local chapters were formed, first in Los Angeles and San Francisco, and then in other cities. Today there are 37 chapters, covering the major U.S. metropolitan areas. Although the group does distribute videos of its major events, outreach to smaller cities remains a continuing challenge.

During the 1950s and '60s, ASMP also grew to encompass a wider range of photographic applications, including such specialties as advertising, catalog, architectural and industrial imagery. After the Internet came of age, The Society's specialty groups took advantage of the free and easy interchange of ideas that bulletin boards, listservs and social networks could provide.

Advocating for photographers' interests

Though then 88 years old and unable to attend in person, in 1967 Edward Steichen, as a still active member of the copyright committee of ASMP, and David Linton as the committee chairman, wrote submissions to the U.S. Senate hearings to support Copyright law revisions. Steichen requested that "this young giant among the visual arts be given equal rights by having its peculiar problems taken into account." Linton wrote; "We join with other creators of 'Original Works of Authorship' in supporting the proposed copyright term of the creator's life plus fifty years after."

During the 1970s, Congress debated a major revision to the copyright laws, culminating in passage of the Copyright Act of 1976. ASMP lobbied for the provision of the Act that automatically grants copyright to the creator of a work. (Under previous U.S. law, copyright was dependent on registering the work with the Copyright Office.) Likewise, in the late '90s ASMP lobbied in favor of the Sonny Bono Copyright Extension Act, which brought U.S. law into conformity with the international Berne Convention treaty by extending the term of copyright to the life of the creator plus 70 years.

Several recent Congresses have considered a change in the treatment of "orphan works", which are copyrighted works whose owner cannot be identified or located. ASMP has testified about the impact on photographers of the proposed changes, and has worked with Congressional committees to mitigate the harm that might be done.

ASMP has also supported photographers in the courts, filing amicus curiae briefs and providing financial support in a number of precedent-setting cases. Major cases of recent years include New York Times Co. v. Tasini (U.S. Supreme Court) and Jarvis v. K2 (Ninth Circuit Court of Appeals). ASMP (with the Graphic Artists Guild, the Picture Archive Council of America, the North American Nature Photography Association, Professional Photographers of America, and several individual photographers) filed class-action litigation against Google, claiming that Google's Library Project, which is scanning millions of books and publications, infringes the copyrights of photographers, illustrators and visual artists.

Some chapters offer lectures or small meetings to facilitate business related questions known as Brain Trusts.

=== Professional education ===
In 1973, at the instigation of then-president Lawrence Fried, ASMP published Professional Business Practices in Photography, a compilation of recommended procedures, industry terminology, and standard forms and contracts. Initially issued in looseleaf format (and informally referred to as the "Business Bible"), the publication has regularly been revised over the years; the seventh edition was released as a trade paperback in 2008.

In addition to the Professional Business Practices book, which is aimed at photographers, ASMP has published pamphlets for photo users that explain how the business works. The Society has also regularly produced business seminars and conferences on topics of interest to professional photographers.

ASMP was among the founding members of the UPDIG Coalition, which in 2006-07 published a set of technical recommendations for accurate reproduction of digital images. In 2008–2011, ASMP sponsored the dpBestflow project that, with financial support from the Library of Congress, published best practices and tutorials for preserving digital images.
