= Conservation photography =

Photography genre

Photo of Management sign encouraging wildlife conservation

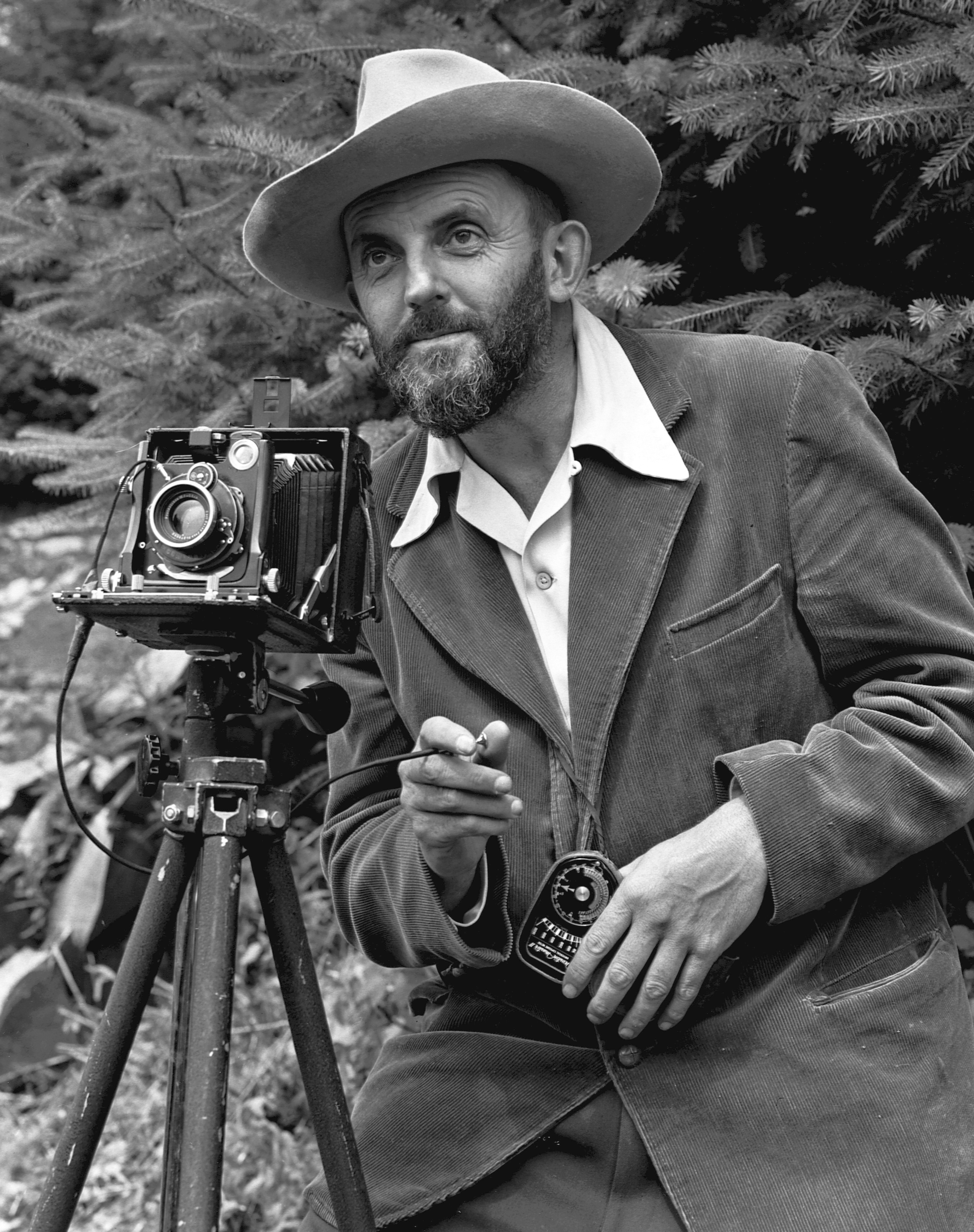
Ansel Easton Adams (1902–1984), an American photographer and environmentalist, photo by J. Malcolm Greany

Conservation photography is the active use of the photographic process and its products, within the parameters of photojournalism, to advocate for conservation outcomes.

Conservation photography combines nature photography with the proactive, issue-oriented approach of documentary photography as an agent for protecting nature and improving the biosphere and natural environment. Conservation Photography furthers environmental conservation, wildlife conservation, habitat conservation or cultural conservation by expanding public awareness of issues and stimulating remedial action.

== History ==
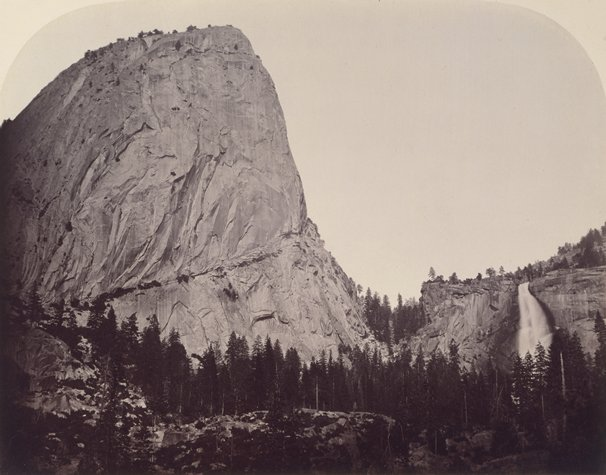
Photo by Carleton E. Watkins (1829–1916) of Mt. Broderick and Nevada Fall (700 ft.) at Yosemite Valley in 1861

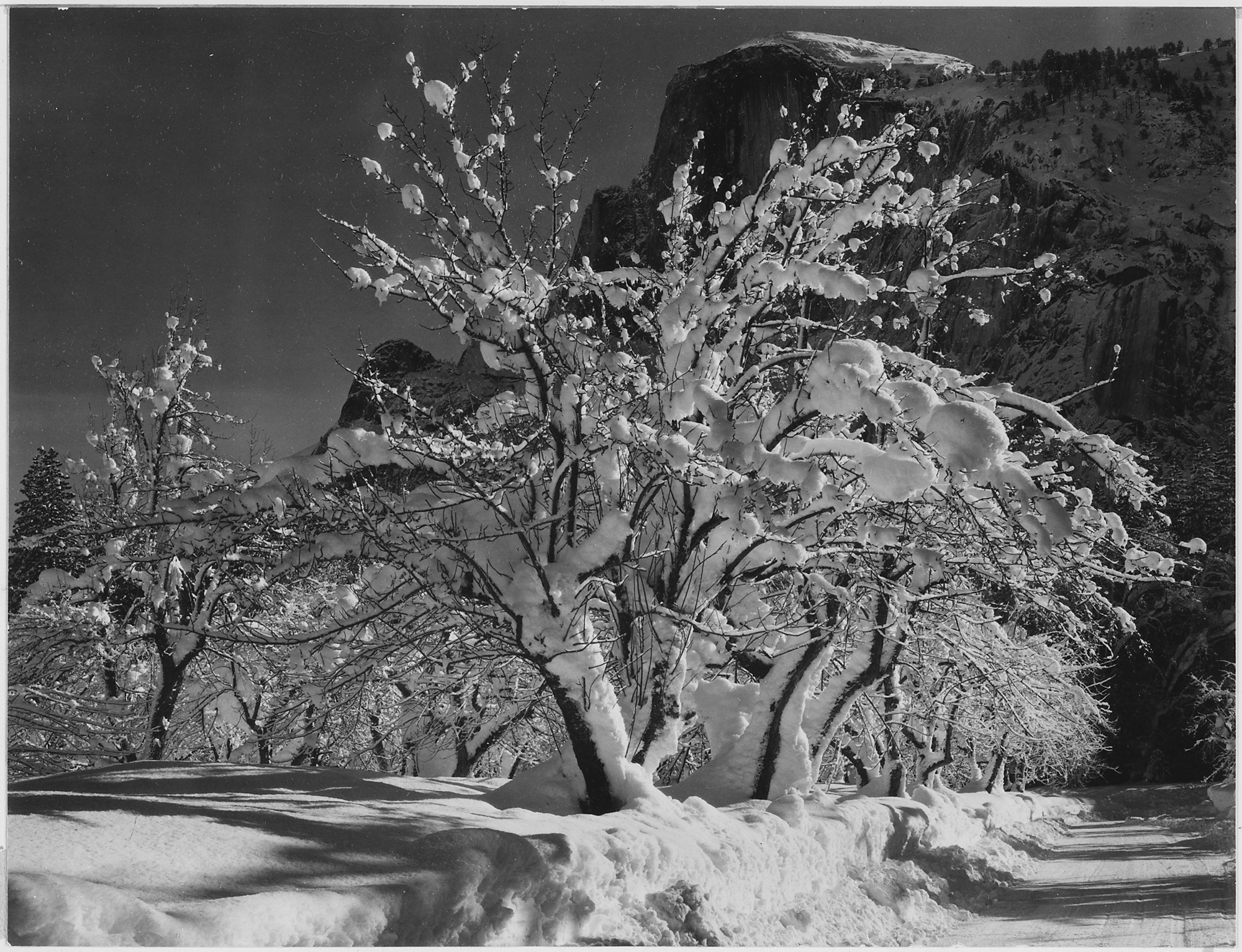
Photo by Ansel Adams of Yosemite Half Dome, Apple Orchard, trees with snow on branches in April 1933

Photography has developed as a powerful medium to empower conservation. Photography has served this role since the 1860s, although not widely acknowledged as such. A notable example are the powerful images of Carleton Watkins which were successfully used to stimulate the establishment of Yosemite National Park in 1864 and William Henry Jackson and Ansel Adams who advocated for expansion and continued funding of the park.

Renewed emphasis on photography-for-conservation arose at the beginning of the 21st century, primarily in response to the human-caused environmental crisis, recognizing that the global pattern of ecosystem degradation was not sustainable.

The modern field of conservation photography was formalized in October 2005 with the founding of the International League of Conservation Photographers by photographer Cristina Mittermeier, during the 8th World Wilderness Congress in Anchorage, Alaska. Prior to 2005 "conservation photography" was not widely recognized as a discipline.

== Definition ==
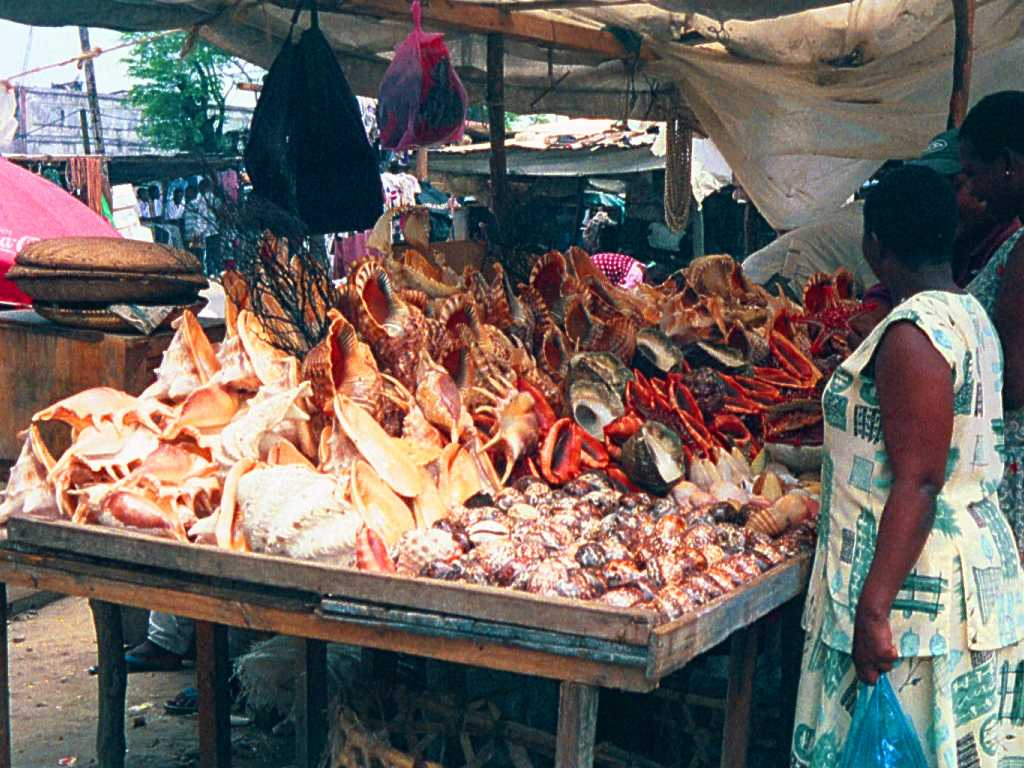
Photo of a vendor in Tanzania in 2000 selling to tourists threatened species seashells which have been taken alive from the sea, killing the animal inside

Conservation and photography appear as two distinct fields, but their combined impact can be profound. Simply put, conservation photography is photography that empowers or enables conservation.

According to the photographer, Joel Sartore, "the typical nature photograph shows a butterfly on a pretty flower. The conservation photograph shows the same thing, but with a bulldozer coming at it in the background. This doesn't mean there's no room for beautiful pictures, in fact we need beautiful images just as much as the issues. It does mean that the images exist for a reason; to save the Earth while we still can."

The serious conservation photographer brings to their work a deep empathy for the natural world. Proper use of the resulting images has the power to bring about positive change.

Conservation photographs fall into two broad categories, both of which are equally valuable:

- The snapshot: upon seeing a striking scene one pulls out a cell phone or point-and-shoot camera, and snaps some quick framed pictures without expending too much time or effort.
- The carefully crafted image: one sees the same scene, but instead of quickly shooting it and moving on, they take a series of skillfully crafted, high-quality images that tell the story in a more powerful way. Dramatic framing enhances the influence of a picture.

Such photographs have a stronger impact on the audience. One may also proactively seek opportunities to take crafted conservation pictures. Determined effort can result in excellent photo stories that can move people's hearts and minds.

== Applications ==
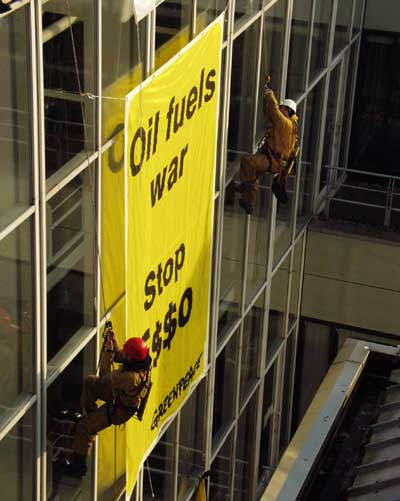
Photo of Greenpeace protest against Esso /ExxonMobil in 2003

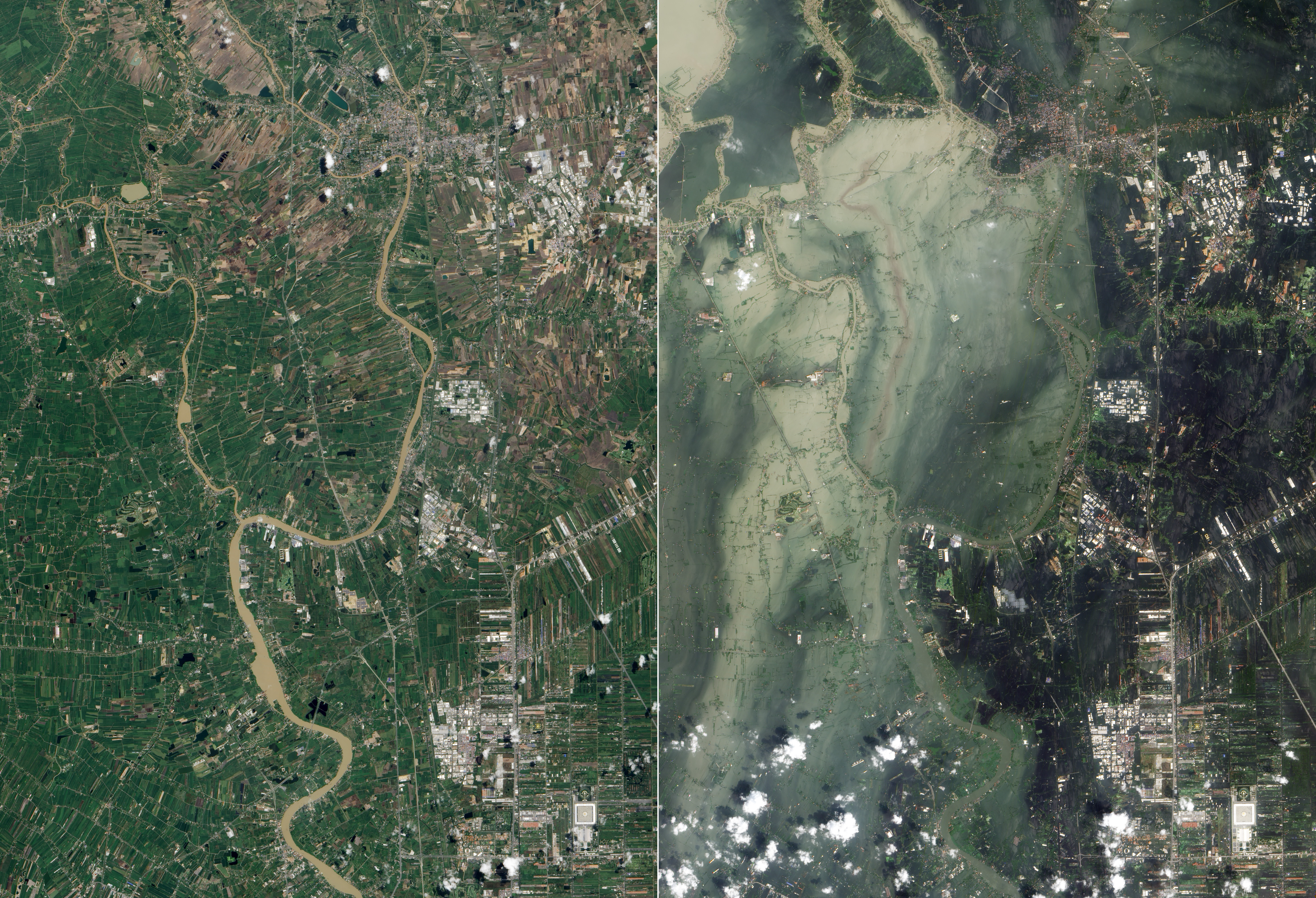
True-colour satellite image showing flooding in Ayutthaya and Pathum Thani Provinces in Central Thailand (right), compared to before the flooding (left) in 2011

In order to create an impact, conservation pictures should be put to work for specific causes. Though not every picture may find an immediate use, a carefully catalogued archive of conservation pictures can help increase impact of conservation related news stories, provide material for public awareness campaigns, including internet activism and sometimes serve as Investigative journalism evidence in court proceedings. Images of habitat destruction, especially in protected areas, can be important as legal evidence against the activity.

Specialty fields

Several specialty fields benefit from their use of conservation photography, these include:

- Conservation movement, to protect animals, fungi, plants and their habitats
  - Conservation biology, the science of the protection and management of biodiversity
  - Conservation genetics - "an interdisciplinary science that aims to apply genetic methods to the conservation and restoration of biodiversity."
  - Conservation (ethic), an ethic of resource use, allocation, and protection, especially of the natural environment
  - Conservation organization typically an environmental organization
  - Conservationist, a person who advocates for conservation of animals, fungi, plants and their habitats
  - Energy conservation, the reduction of non-renewable energy consumption
  - Habitat conservation, a land management practice that seeks to conserve, protect and restore, habitat areas for wild animals, fungi and plants
  - Water conservation, reducing the use of water to protect the environment
  - Wetland conservation, protecting wetlands to conserve their ecological processes
  - Wildlife management, multidisciplinary practices, including conservation of species and their habitats
  - Conservation authority (Canada)
  - Marine conservation, the protection and preservation of ecosystems in oceans and seas
  - Soil conservation, management strategies for prevention of soil being eroded from the earth’s surface or becoming chemically altered
- Conservation-restoration, the profession devoted to the preservation of cultural resources
  - Art conservation, protecting works of art
  - Photograph conservation
  - Architectural conservation

Subjects

Some subjects of conservation photography include:

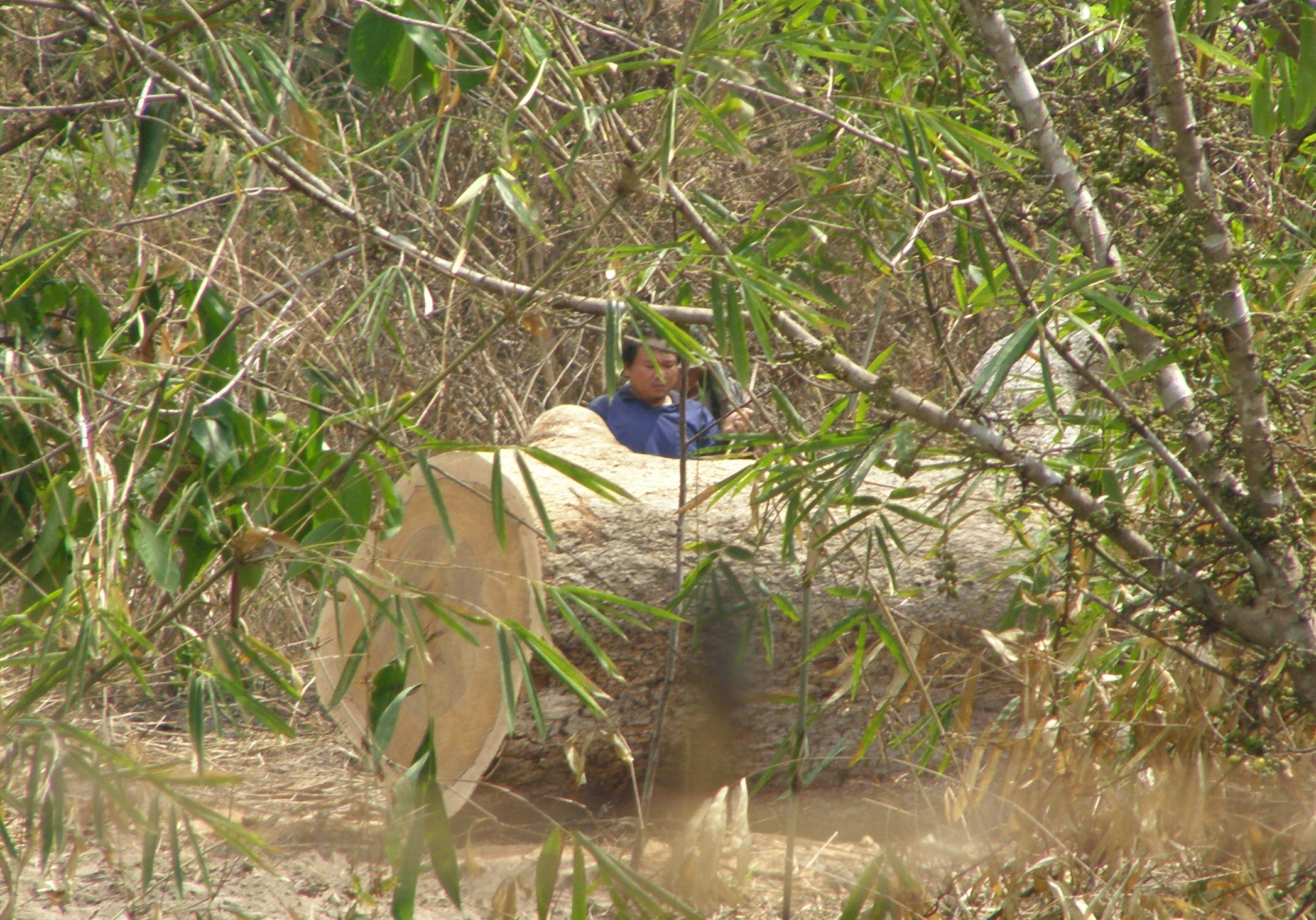
Photo of Illegal logging in Thailand was taken from the roadside in Chiang Mai Province in 2011

- Destruction/construction activity inside a protected area.
- Commercial activity in ecologically sensitive zones (ESZs) – the areas immediately bordering national parks and reserves
- Illegal logging or mining activity
- Habitat fragmentation or destruction, ranging from individual tree felling to land clearing for a large hydroelectric project.
- Forest fires.
- Cattle / goats inside protected areas.
- New roads inside or near a protected area.

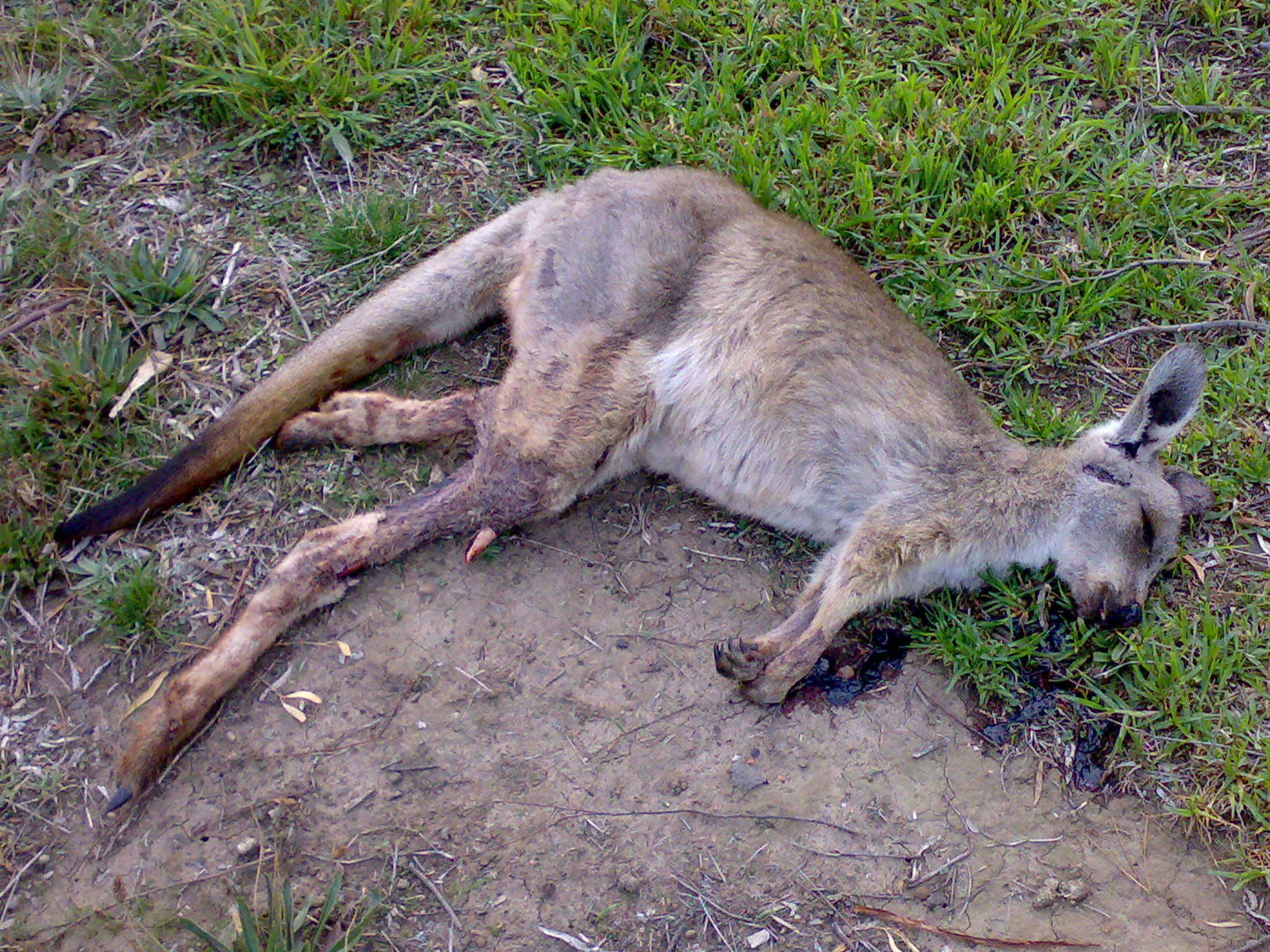
Photo of roadkilled kangaroo in Australia

- Evidence of poaching or hunting, such as empty gun shells, snares, jaw traps, skinned carcass etc.
- Road kills.
- Wildlife kept as pets.
- Tourism and its impacts.
- Harvest of forest produce.
- Public exhibitions or appearances of environmental activists
- Human-wildlife conflict events or results

== Organizations ==
There are many environmental organizations that effectively use conservation photography to help advocate their goals. Just a few are:

- ARKive is a global initiative with the mission of "promoting the conservation of the world's threatened species, through the power of wildlife imagery", which it does by locating and gathering films, photographs and audio recordings of the world's species into a centralised digital archive. Its current priority is the completion of audio-visual profiles for the c. 17,000 species on the IUCN Red List of threatened species.
- Sanctuary Asia is India's first and one of its leading environmental news magazines. It was founded in 1981 to raise awareness among Indian people of their disappearing natural heritage. The magazine is attractively packaged with colored photographs. The Sanctuary Photo Library' is a melting pot of natural history visuals, information and resources used to produce some of the finest wildlife and nature calendars, posters, slide shows, exhibitions and other products available in India.
- Sierra club maintains a publishing imprint, Sierra Club Books, publishing books on environmental issues, wilderness photographic essays, nature guides, and other related subjects. They publish the Sierra Club Calendars, perennial bestsellers, featuring photographs by well-known nature photographers such as Galen Rowell.
- The International League of Conservation Photographers (iLCP) is a nonprofit organization dedicated to furthering environmental and cultural conservation through ethical photography.
