= Blackbeard's Law =

2015 US law concerning photographs of shipwrecks

On August 18, 2015, then North Carolina Governor Pat McCrory (R) signed "Blackbeard's Law," N.C. General Statute §121-25(b), into law. The statute stated that,

"All photographs, video recordings, or other documentary materials of a derelict vessel or shipwreck or its contents, relics, artifacts, or historic materials in the custody of any agency of the North Carolina government or its subdivisions shall be a public record pursuant to G.S. 132-1. There shall be no limitation on the use of or no requirement to alter any such photograph, video recordings, or other documentary material, and any such provision in any agreement, permit, or license shall be void and unenforceable as a matter of public policy."

The statute was inserted into another bill by Representatives Norman Sanderson (R - Pamlico) and Jim Davis (R - Macon) at the request of the North Carolina Department of Natural and Cultural Resources (NCDNCR). One year later, the North Carolina Legislature amended the statute to read, "All photographs, video recordings, or other documentary materials of a derelict vessel or shipwreck or its contents, relics, artifacts, or historic materials in the custody of any agency of North Carolina government or its subdivisions shall be a public record pursuant to Chapter 132 of the General Statutes." The moniker "Blackbeard's Law" refers to the pirate Blackbeard and was first penned by reporter Paul Woolverton of the Fayetteville Observer.

== Legal issues and the United States Supreme Court ==
In 2013 and 2015, the state government of North Carolina uploaded Nautilus Productions videos of the wreck of the Queen Anne's Revenge to YouTube and the NC State Government Website Archives & Access Program Social Media Archive without permission. Before posting the videos detailed in the litigation, the North Carolina Legislature passed "Blackbeard's Law", N.C. General Statute §121-25(b). As a result, on December 1, 2015, Nautilus, which had documented the shipwreck recovery for nearly two decades, filed suit in federal court against North Carolina, NCDNCR and the Friends of Queen Anne's Revenge non-profit over copyright violations and the passage of "Blackbeard's Law" by the North Carolina legislature.

On November 5, 2019, the U.S. Supreme Court heard oral arguments in Allen v. Cooper. During oral arguments, Justice Sonia Sotomayor opined that, "the Blackbeard law does trouble [her] deeply."

On March 23, 2020, the Supreme Court ruled in favor of North Carolina and struck down the Copyright Remedy Clarification Act, which Congress passed in 1989 to attempt to curb such infringements of copyright by states.

As a result of the ruling, Nautilus filed a motion for reconsideration in the United States District Court for the Eastern District of North Carolina. On August 18, 2021, Judge Terrence Boyle granted the motion for reconsideration which North Carolina promptly appealed to the United States Court of Appeals for the Fourth Circuit. The 4th Circuit denied the state's motion on October 14, 2022. Nautilus then filed their second amended complaint on February 8, 2023, alleging Fifth and Fourteenth Amendment violations of Nautilus' constitutional rights, additional copyright violations, and claiming that North Carolina's "Blackbeard's Law" represents a Bill of Attainder.

In a press release Nautilus noted that, "North Carolina...and state entities can sue others for copyright infringement and damages. However, U.S. citizens and corporations are legally barred from suing states or state entities for those very same copyright infringements or for damages!” Eight years after the law's passage, on June 30, 2023, North Carolina Gov. Roy Cooper signed a bill repealing Blackbeard's Law.
