= Nautilus Productions =

American video production, stock footage, and photography company

- Company type: Private
- Industry: Video production; stock footage; photography
- Headquarters: Fayetteville, NC, USA
- Website: nautilusproductions.com

Nautilus Productions LLC is an American video production, stock footage, and photography company incorporated in Fayetteville, North Carolina in 1997. The principals are producer/director Rick Allen and photographer Cindy Burnham. Nautilus specializes in documentary production and underwater videography, and produced QAR DiveLive, a live webcast of underwater archaeology filmed at the wreck of the Queen Anne's Revenge in 2000 and 2001.

== History and output ==
Nautilus has produced several documentaries, including The Kill Zone for the National Geographic International Channel; Assault on America: The Battle for Torpedo Junction for the Canadian History Channel; and the Mystery Mardi Gras Shipwreck for Texas A&M University; BOEM; and the Louisiana State Museum. Above the water Nautilus spent seven years covering NASCAR for Office Depot and also worked with Bob Ballard, discoverer of the Titanic, on a piece for CBS 60 Minutes.

Nautilus Productions is also the owner and licensor of stock footage from the Queen Anne's Revenge Shipwreck Project. Nautilus documented the shipwreck recovery for nearly two decades and many documentaries created about the pirate Blackbeard and the Queen Anne's Revenge Shipwreck Project have incorporated project videographer Rick Allen's stock footage or video in their content.

In 2000, Nautilus Productions co-produced with Bill Lovin of Marine Grafics, a week-long live internet broadcast known as QAR DiveLive from the Blackbeard wreck site and the Queen Anne's Revenge conservation lab. At the time, this was the first live video and audio broadcast from an underwater archaeological site to the World Wide Web. Students were able to watch the underwater archaeology in real time, virtually visit the lab and ask questions of the scientists exploring the shipwreck. The twice-daily live distance learning programs reached students from as far away as Canada during the five days of broadcasting. In October 2001 Allen and Lovin again co-produced the QAR DiveLive 2001 webcasts with similar success.

Other projects include videography on the USS Monitor and HMCS Canada (Queen of Nassau) with the National Oceanic and Atmospheric Administration (NOAA), the recovery of a World War II era B-25C Mitchell bomber from Lake Murray, SC for the Mega Movers series on the History Channel, and the SS Commodore, made famous in author Stephen Crane's short story "The Open Boat".

== Works ==
- Lights, Camera ... Shipwreck!?! Multimedia at Four Thousand Feet. Kimberly L. Faulk and Rick Allen, Historical Archaeology, Vol. 51, Issue 3, The Mardi Gras Shipwreck: The Archaeology of an Early Nineteenth-Century Wooden-Hulled Sailing Ship, September 2017, pp. 418–424.

== Legal Issues & the United States Supreme Court ==
In 2013 and 2015, the state government of North Carolina uploaded Nautilus Productions videos of the wreck of the Queen Anne's Revenge to its website without permission. As a result, Nautilus filed suit in federal court over copyright violations and the passage of "Blackbeard's Law" by the North Carolina legislature. Before posting the videos the North Carolina Legislature passed "Blackbeard's Law", N.C. General Statute §121-25(b), which stated, "All photographs, video recordings, or other documentary materials of a derelict vessel or shipwreck or its contents, relics, artifacts, or historic materials in the custody of any agency of North Carolina government or its subdivisions shall be a public record pursuant to Chapter 132 of the General Statutes."

On November 5, 2019, the U.S. Supreme Court heard oral arguments in Allen v. Cooper. On March 23, 2020, the Supreme Court ruled in favor of North Carolina and struck down the Copyright Remedy Clarification Act, which Congress passed in 1989 to attempt to curb such infringements of copyright by states.

As a result of the ruling Nautilus filed a motion for reconsideration in the United States District Court for the Eastern District of North Carolina. On August 18, 2021 Judge Terrence Boyle granted the motion for reconsideration which North Carolina promptly appealed to the United States Court of Appeals for the Fourth Circuit. The 4th Circuit denied the state's motion on October 14, 2022. Nautilus then filed their second amended complaint on February 8, 2023 alleging 5th and 14th Amendment violations of Nautilus' constitutional rights, additional copyright violations, and claiming that North Carolina's "Blackbeard's Law" represents a Bill of Attainder.

Eight years after the passage of Blackbeard's Law, on June 30, 2023, North Carolina Gov. Roy Cooper signed a bill repealing the law.
