= Digimind =

Global computer software company

Onclusive Social
- Formerly: Digimind
- Type: Privately held company
- Industry: Computer software
- Founded: 1998, Grenoble, France
- Founder: Paul Vivant (CEO); Patrice François (Associate Director)
- Area served: Worldwide
- Services: Competitive Intelligence
- Revenue: 15,800,000 euro (2023)
- Net income: 1,600,000 euro (2023)
- Number of employees: > 200 (2019)
- Subsidiaries: New York, Singapore, Rabat, Madrid
- Website: https://onclusive.com/en-gb/products/social-listening/

Onclusive Social, formerly Digimind, is a global social listening and competitive intelligence product providing information on businesses' competitive standing in the market. Now part of global media intelligence provider Onclusive, Digimind was founded in 1998. As of 2019, the company had more than 200 employees across offices in North America, Europe, Asia and Africa. In 2022 Digimind was acquired by global media monitoring and analytics company Onclusive. In October 2022, Digimind rebranded to Onclusive Social, Onclusive's social listening product.

== History ==
Digimind was founded in 1998 by Paul Vivant, Patrice François, Gerald Navarette and Romain Laboisse in Grenoble, France. Within a year, they launched vStrat, a collaborative market intelligence software tool for Lotus Notes (now IBM Notes). This was followed by the release of Strategic Finder, a meta search engine, in 1999. By the end of 1999, the software had reached over 60,000 users.

In 2003 the company launched Digimind Evolution, a competitive intelligence software application. The company's subsequent success and expansion in both French- and English-speaking markets facilitated the opening of a Research & Development centre in Rabat, Morocco in 2006, and an office in Cambridge, MA in 2008. In 2007, Digimind launched Digimind 7, an application providing real-time visual analysis of news stories.

In July 2024, Digimind was acquired by Onclusive, a portfolio company of Symphony Technology Group. Later that year, Digimind rebranded to Onclusive Social reflecting it's full integration with media intelligence provider Onclusive.
