= International Association of Panoramic Photographers =

Photographic organization

- International Association of Panoramic Photographers
- Abbreviation: IAPP
- Formation: April 1984
- Headquarters: Boca Raton
- Location: Florida, United States
- Region served: Worldwide
- Services: Membership organization
- Fields: Panoramic photography
- Official language: English
- Affiliations: Professional Photographers of America
- Website: www.panphoto.com

The International Association of Panoramic Photographers (IAPP) is an international organization concerned with public awareness and appreciation for panoramic photography and immersive imaging.

IAPP had its first meeting in April 1984. It is affiliated with the Professional Photographers of America and the headquarters are in Boca Raton, Florida, United States. Members are both amateur and professional photographers, including those from the arts, computer science fields, the film industry, journalism, NASA, etc. Members of the association provide technical assistance and share information about business options, color printing techniques, stock agency needs, etc.

IAPP is "the leading professional organization for panoramic photographers located throughout the world."
