= J. Malcolm Greany =

American photographer (1915–1999)

- Born: John Malcolm Greany; April 23, 1915; Philadelphia, Pennsylvania, U.S.
- Died: July 27, 1999 (aged 84); Hood River, Oregon, U.S.
- Known for: Photography, work with Ansel Adams and Bernard R. Hubbard
- Spouse: Irene Greany

John Malcolm Greany (April 23, 1915 – July 27, 1999) was an American nature photographer. Born in Philadelphia, Greany grew up in Detroit. In 1936 he went to Juneau, Alaska, joining Alaska explorer and promoter Bernard R. Hubbard on an expedition along the Taku River. Greany settled in Juneau in 1938 following his marriage to his wife Irene. During World War II he worked for the U.S. Army as a photographer. His photographs of the inhabitants of Attu Island in 1941 represent the last and virtually the only documentation of life on the island, since the inhabitants of Attu were deported when it was occupied by Japanese forces, and they never returned.

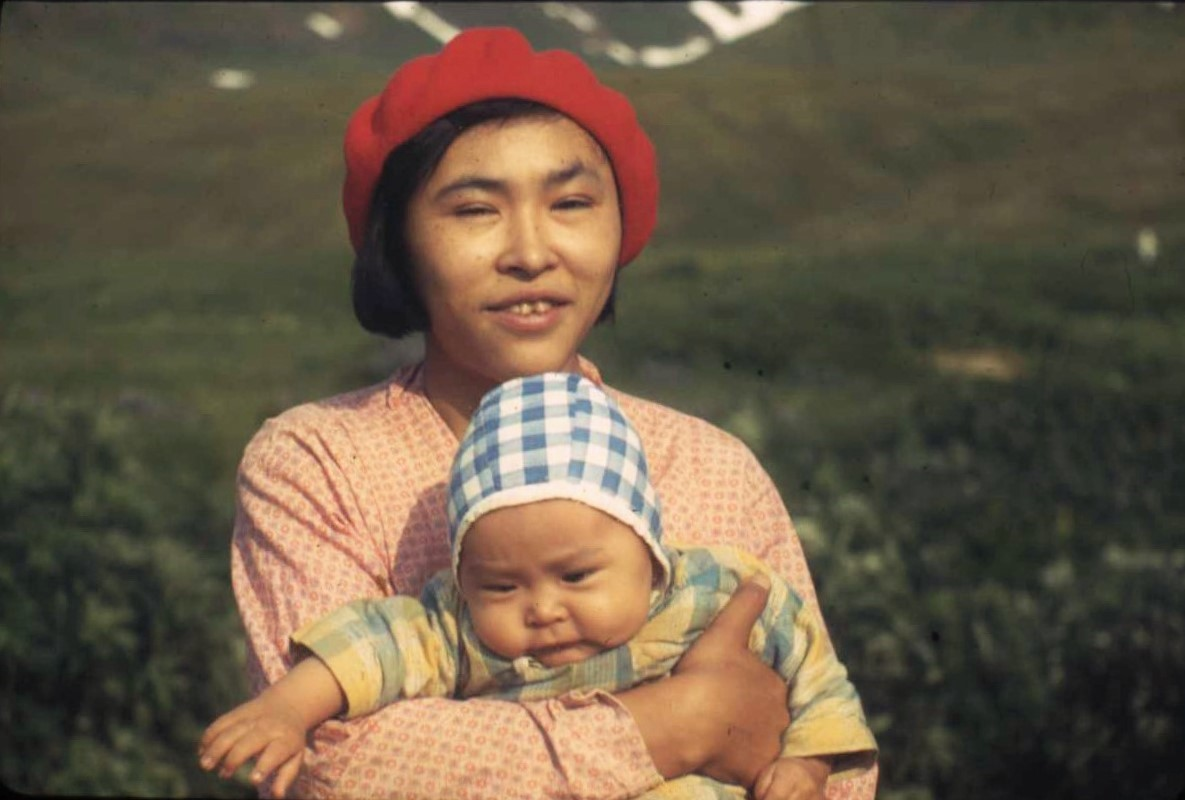
Attu Woman, photograph by Greany in 1941

After the war Greany worked for public agencies in Alaska and later for the U.S. Forest Service in Montana. His photographs appeared in Time and National Geographic. Greany was a friend of Ansel Adams, with whom he collaborated.

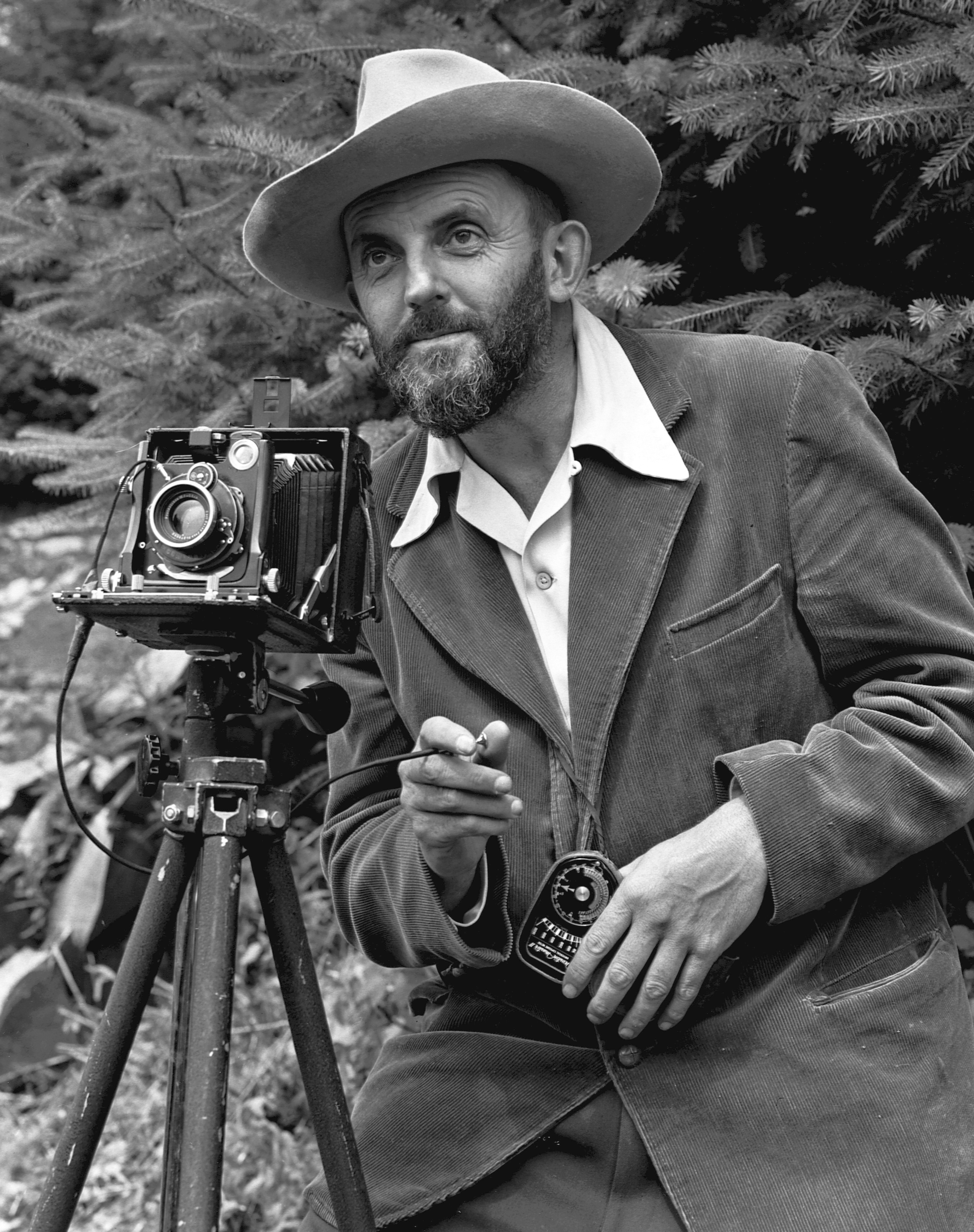
Photograph of Ansel Adams by Greany, c. 1950

In 1974 Greany moved to Irene's hometown, Hood River, Oregon. He died on July 27, 1999, in Hood River.
