= Copyright Remedy Clarification Act =

United States copyright law

- Long title: To amend chapters 5 and 9 of title 17, United States Code, to clarify that States, instrumentalities of States, and officers and employees of States acting in their official capacity, are subject to suit in Federal court by any person for infringement of copyright and infringement of exclusive rights in mask works, and that all the remedies can be obtained in such suit that can be obtained in a suit against a private person or against other public entities.
- Acronyms (colloquial): CRCA
- Enacted by: the 101st United States Congress

Citations
- Public law: Pub. L. 101-553
- Statutes at Large: 104 Stat. 2749 (1990)

Codification
- Acts amended: Copyright Act of 1976
- Titles amended: 17 (Copyrights)
- U.S.C. sections amended: 17 USC 511(a)

Legislative history
- Introduced in the House of Representatives as H.R. 3045 by Robert Kastenmeier (D–WI) on July 28, 1989

The Copyright Remedy Clarification Act (CRCA) is a United States copyright law that attempted to abrogate sovereign immunity of states for copyright infringement. The CRCA amended 17 USC 511(a):

In general. Any State, any instrumentality of a State, and any officer or employee of a State or instrumentality of a State acting in his or her official capacity, shall not be immune, under the Eleventh Amendment of the Constitution of the United States or under any other doctrine of sovereign immunity, from suit in Federal Court by any person, including any governmental or nongovernmental entity, for a violation of any of the exclusive rights of a copyright owner provided by sections 106 through 122, for importing copies of phonorecords in violation of section 602, or for any other violation under this title.

== Unconstitutionality ==
The CRCA has been struck down as unconstitutional by the United States Supreme Court in Allen v. Cooper (March 23, 2020).

The Supreme Court decision followed district and appellate courts in the 1st, 2nd, 4th, 5th, 6th, 9th, and 11th Circuits. The 11th Circuit did not strike down the CRCA but did not allow it to be used to avoid sovereign immunity on the facts that were before it. A case in the 9th Circuit settled before decision. Courts have generally followed the logic applied by the US Supreme Court in Seminole Tribe v. Florida, and applied in the patent context in Florida Prepaid v. College Savings Bank, 527 U.S. 627 (1999). In these cases the Court held that the Eleventh Amendment to the United States Constitution prohibits Congress from using its Article I powers to abrogate states' sovereign immunity (a holding that later Supreme Court cases such as Central Virginia Community College v. Katz have qualified), and that the Patent Remedy Clarification Act did not have a sufficient basis to meet Fourteenth Amendment requirements. Although most courts have refused to enforce the CRCA, one district court upheld the Act in 2017 and the 4th Circuit Court of Appeals should rule on an appeal from that decision in mid to late 2018.

Several cases upheld the sovereign immunity of state universities in particular. Legal scholars Paul J. Heald and Michael Wells wrote that

the majority of lower courts that have addressed the question have assumed state universities to be arms of the state for the purpose of asserting Eleventh Amendment immunity.

Further, cases for copyright violation by university radio stations were also dismissed as the radio, funded mostly by the university, was found to enjoy the same immunity.

Here, the evidence is convincing and clear that WKMS is both financially and operationally dependent on the University and its Board of Regents, which, as we have already established, is considered the Commonwealth of Kentucky for purposes of Eleventh Amendment immunity. See Jackson v. Murray State Univ., 834 F. Supp. 2d.

The CRCA attempt was repeated by Congress with the Intellectual Property Protection Restoration Act of 2001.

== Allen v. Cooper ==
The North Carolina Legislature passed "Blackbeard's Law", N.C. General Statute §121-25(b), which stated, "All photographs, video recordings, or other documentary materials of a derelict vessel or shipwreck or its contents, relics, artifacts, or historic materials in the custody of any agency of North Carolina government or its subdivisions shall be a public record pursuant to Chapter 132 of the General Statutes." The state government of North Carolina accordingly uploaded videos of the wreck of the Queen Anne's Revenge to its website.

Nautilus Productions, the company documenting the recovery since 1998, filed suit in federal court over copyright violations. The Supreme Court granted certiorari in the case in 2019.

On November 5, 2019 the United States Supreme Court heard oral arguments in Allen v. Cooper. On March 23, 2020, the Supreme Court of the United States issued an opinion in Allen v. Cooper, holding that Congress had no Constitutional authority to abrogate state sovereign immunity via the Copyright Remedy Clarification Act. In other words, the CRCA is unconstitutional. Congress failed to provide evidence to support the need to abrogate sovereign immunity.

The case had received broad participation. The American Library Association and others filed an amicus brief siding with the state, saying that "state-run libraries and archives have not abused state sovereign immunity; copyright holders have sufficient means of enforcing their rights against state-run libraries and archives; elimination of the sovereign immunity for copyright claims would endanger digital preservation efforts by state-run libraries and archives". Thirteen amici filed briefs in support of Allen, including the United States Chamber of Commerce, the Recording Industry Association of America, the Copyright Alliance, the Software and Information Industry Association, and the National Press Photographers Association. Those briefs proposed various doctrines under which the CRCA could validly abrogate sovereign immunity and variously re-asserted and supported the reasons why Congress examined and enacted CRCA, claiming that Congress was fair in finding that states had abused immunity and that an alternative remedy was needed. The brief by APLU and AAU stated the opposite on all counts. 30 states also filed a brief in support of Cooper, denying that the states had ever given up their sovereign immunity by ratifying the Progress Clause or otherwise. The brief by a law professor stated that there was no copyright infringement in the first place, under de minimis and fair use.

Following the ruling, Senators Thom Tillis (R-North Carolina) and Patrick Leahy (D-Vermont), of the intellectual property subcommittee on the Senate Judiciary Committee, sent letters to the U.S. Copyright Office and the U.S. Patent and Trademark Office requesting a study detailing copyright infringements by state governments. The United States Copyright Office gave intellectual property owners suffering infringement by state entities until August 3, 2020 to publicly comment as part of this inquiry. In September 2020 the U.S. Copyright Office began publishing comments where the copyright industry alleged hundreds of copyright violations by state entities across decades, while libraries and state entities denied the significance or intentionality of the alleged infringements. The subsequent report, issued on August 31, 2021 by the U.S. Copyright Office, referenced 132 copyright lawsuits filed against state entities and stated that "The Office..continues to believe that infringement by state entities is an issue worthy of congressional action."

As a result of the ruling Nautilus filed a motion for reconsideration in the United States District Court for the Eastern District of North Carolina. On August 18, 2021 Judge Terrence Boyle granted the motion for reconsideration which North Carolina promptly appealed to the United States Court of Appeals for the Fourth Circuit. The 4th Circuit denied the state's motion on October 14, 2022. Nautilus then filed their second amended complaint on February 8, 2023 alleging 5th and 14th Amendment violations of Nautilus' constitutional rights, additional copyright violations, and claiming that North Carolina's "Blackbeard's Law," N.C. General Statute §121-25(b), represents a Bill of Attainder.

Eight years after the law's passage, on June 30, 2023, North Carolina Gov. Roy Cooper signed a bill repealing Blackbeard's Law.

== Case law ==
- Chavez v. Arte Publico Press, 204 F.3d 601 (5th Cir. 2000)
- Salerno v. City University of New York, 191 F. Supp. 2d 352 (S.D.N.Y. 2001)
- Hairston v. North Carolina Agricultural and Technical State University, 2005 WL 2136923 (M.D.N.C. 2005)
- De Romero v. Institute of Puerto Rican Culture, 466 F. Supp. 2d 410 (D.P.R. 2006)
- Marketing Information Masters v. The Trustees of the California State University, 522 F.Supp. 2d 1088 (S.D. Cal. 2008)
- Romero v. California Dept. of Transportation, 2009 WL 650629 (C.D. Cal. 2009)
- Jacobs v. Memphis Convention and Visitors Bureau, 710 F. Supp. 2d 663 (W.D. Tenn. 2010)
- Parker v. Dufreshne, 2010 U.S. Dist. LEXIS 64481 (W.D. La. 2010)
- Whipple v. Utah, 2011 WL 4368568 (D. Utah 2011)
- National Association of Boards of Pharmacy v. University of Georgia (11th Cir. 2011) – says CRCA could be justified by 14th Amendment but the case before it did not present a factually sufficient due process claim.
- Reiner v. Saginaw Valley State University et al (Thomas Canale), E.D. Mich. March 15, 2018 (following other circuits in not entertaining a CRCA claim)
- Coyle v. University of Kentucky, 2. F. Supp. 3d 1014 (E.D. Ky. March 4, 2014)
- Issaenko v. University of Minnesota, 57 F.Supp. 3d 985 (D. Minn. 2014)
- Philpot v. WUIS/University of Illinois Springfield, S.D. Ind. Aug. 25, 2015.
- Campinha-Bacote v. Regents of the University of Michigan, 2016 U.S. Dist. LEXIS 5958 (S.D. Ohio Jan. 19, 2016)
- American Shooting Center, Inc. v. Sefcor Int'l, 2016 U.S. Dist. LEXIS 96111 (S.D. Cal. July 22, 2016)
- Alisa Wolf v. Oakland University, E.D. Mich. Dec. 5, 2016 (finding Chavez and Jacobs to be "highly persuasive")
- Nettleman III v. Florida Atlantic University, S.D. Fla. Jan. 5, 2017 (finding plaintiff did not state a complaint under the CRCA sufficient to abrogate state immunity, and noting the 5th Circuit's Chavez holding CRCA to be unconstitutional)
- Bell v. Indiana University (S.D. Ind. March 9, 2018)
- Allen v. Cooper, (U.S. Supreme Court March 23, 2020)

== See also ==
- Eleventh Amendment to the United States Constitution
- Florida Prepaid Postsecondary Education Expense Board v. College Savings Bank
