= Software and Information Industry Association =

Trade association

- Abbreviation: SIIA
- Formation: 1984; 42 years ago
- Headquarters: Washington, D.C.
- President: Christopher Mohr
- Website: siia.net

The Software and Information Industry Association (SIIA) is a trade association dedicated to the entertainment, consumer and business software industries. Established in 1984 as the Software Publishers Association (SPA), the SIIA took its new name when it merged with the related Information Industry Association on January 1, 1999. The joint enterprise was headed by Software Publishers Association founder Ken Wasch and operated out of the SPA's existing offices.

The SPA was active in lobbying, industry research and anti-piracy efforts, and was behind the 1992 Don't Copy That Floppy campaign. The organization's head of research, Ann Stephens, went on to found PC Data in 1991. By 1995, the SPA had over 1,100 software companies in its membership and according to Wired was among "the most powerful computer-related trade groups" before its merger with the Information Industry Association. While Microsoft became a member of the SPA in 1986, it split with the SIIA in 2000 after the group sided against Microsoft in United States v. Microsoft Corp. The Wall Street Journal described Microsoft as the SIIA's "largest member" before the departure.

Until 1999, the Software Publishers Association hosted the SPA Annual Conference for software companies. It was renamed the InfoSoft Essentials conference in 1999.

== Divisions ==
Public Policy ~ legal and public policy
IP Protection ~ protecting software content
Connectiv ~ business information
ETIN ~ Education Technology
FISD ~ Financial & Information
SIPA ~ Specialized Information Publishers
SSD ~ Software & Services

== Advocacy ==
=== Don't Copy That Floppy ===
Don't Copy That Floppy was an anti-copyright infringement campaign run by the SPA beginning in 1992. The video for the campaign, starring M. E. Hart as "MC Double Def DP", was filmed at Cardozo High School in Washington, D.C. and produced by cooperation between the SPA, the Educational Section Anti-Piracy Committee, and the Copyright Protection Fund, in association with Vilardi Films. The groups distributed the film for general viewing through VHS tapes that were mailed to schools. In later years, the film became an internet meme on websites such as YouTube.

Alongside the internet popularity, a clip of it was also used for a sample by American indie pop band TV Girl.

=== Legal cases ===
SIIA filed briefs in Allen v. Cooper, which was decided in 2020: the Supreme Court of the United States abrogated the Copyright Remedy Clarification Act as unconstitutional, SIIA had argued the opposite view.

== Awards ceremonies ==
=== CODiE Awards ===

Beginning in 1986, the Software Publishers Association hosted the "Excellence in Software Awards" ceremony, an annual black-tie event that The Washington Post and Los Angeles Times compared to the Academy Awards. The Excellence in Software Awards were later renamed the "CODiE Awards", and were presented by the Software and Information Industry Association (SPA's successor in interest) until 2025 when they were sold to CODiEAwards.com.

Notable past winners include companies such as Adobe, BrainPOP, Google, Knewton, McGraw-Hill Education, Jigsaw, Netsuite, Red Hat, Rosetta Stone, Salesforce.com, Digimind, Scribe Software, Vocus, WSJ.com, codemantra, IXL Learning, itslearning, and more.

=== Jesse H. Neal Awards ===
The Jesse H. Neal Awards were created in 1955 for editorial excellence in business Media and named after Jesse H. Neal, Connectiv's first managing director. Nations Restaurant News says winning the Neal Award is like winning the Pulitzer Prize for Business-to-business (B2B) platforms. Entries are judged in three areas ~ editorial craftsmanship, extent of service to the field and journalistic enterprise. Out of the 21 categories one winner will be selected for The Grand Neal Award. As of 2020 there have been 25 winners of The Grand Neal Award. In 2019, John Heltman, business and finance reporter with American Banker and SourceMedia, won the Grand Neal Award for the podcast series Nobody's Home.

== See also ==
- List of computer-related awards
