= Allen v. Cooper =

- Supreme Court of the United States

Decided March 23, 2020
- Full case name: Allen v. Cooper
- Citations: 589 U.S. 248 (more)

Holding
- Congress did not have the authority to abrogate the states' sovereign immunity from copyright infringement suits in the Copyright Remedy Clarification Act of 1990.

Court membership
- Chief Justice John Roberts Associate Justices Clarence Thomas · Ruth Bader Ginsburg; Stephen Breyer · Samuel Alito; Sonia Sotomayor · Elena Kagan; Neil Gorsuch · Brett Kavanaugh

Case opinions
- Majority: Kagan, joined by Roberts, Alito, Sotomayor, Gorsuch, Kavanaugh; Thomas (in part)
- Concurrence: Thomas (in part)
- Concurrence: Breyer (in judgment), joined by Ginsburg

Allen v. Cooper, 589 U.S. 248 (2020), was a United States Supreme Court case holding that Congress lacked the authority to abrogate the States' sovereign immunity from copyright infringement suits via the Copyright Remedy Clarification Act of 1990.

== Background ==
In 1996, a marine salvage company named Intersal, Inc., discovered the shipwreck of the Queen Anne's Revenge off the North Carolina coast. North Carolina, the shipwreck's legal owner, contracted with Intersal to conduct recovery operations. Intersal, in turn, hired videographer Frederick Allen to document the efforts. Allen recorded videos and took photos of the recovery for more than a decade. He registered copyrights in all of his works. When North Carolina published some of Allen's videos and photos online, Allen sued for copyright infringement. North Carolina moved to dismiss the lawsuit on the ground of state sovereign immunity. Allen countered that the Copyright Remedy Clarification Act of 1990 (CRCA) removed the States' sovereign immunity in copyright infringement cases. The federal District Court agreed with Allen, finding in the CRCA's text a clear congressional intent to abrogate state sovereign immunity and a proper constitutional basis for that abrogation. The court acknowledged that the Supreme Court case Florida Prepaid Postsecondary Ed. Expense Bd. v. College Savings Bank precluded Congress from using its Article I powers—including its authority over copyrights—to deprive States of sovereign immunity. Nonetheless, the court held that Congress could accomplish its objective under Section 5 of the Fourteenth Amendment. The Fourth Circuit Court of Appeals reversed, reading Florida Prepaid to prevent recourse to both Article I and Section 5.

== Opinion of the court ==
The Supreme Court issued an opinion on March 23, 2020.
