= 1718 =

1718 in various calendars
- Gregorian calendar: 1718; MDCCXVIII
- Ab urbe condita: 2471
- Armenian calendar: 1167; ԹՎ ՌՃԿԷ
- Assyrian calendar: 6468
- Balinese saka calendar: 1639–1640
- Bengali calendar: 1124–1125
- Berber calendar: 2668
- British Regnal year: 4 Geo. 1 – 5 Geo. 1
- Buddhist calendar: 2262
- Burmese calendar: 1080
- Byzantine calendar: 7226–7227
- Chinese calendar: 丁酉年 (Fire Rooster); 4415 or 4208 — to — 戊戌年 (Earth Dog); 4416 or 4209
- Coptic calendar: 1434–1435
- Discordian calendar: 2884
- Ethiopian calendar: 1710–1711
- Hebrew calendar: 5478–5479
- Hindu calendars
- Vikram Samvat: 1774–1775
- Shaka Samvat: 1639–1640
- Kali Yuga: 4818–4819
- Holocene calendar: 11718
- Igbo calendar: 718–719
- Iranian calendar: 1096–1097
- Islamic calendar: 1130–1131
- Japanese calendar: Kyōhō 3 (享保３年)
- Javanese calendar: 1641–1643
- Julian calendar: Gregorian minus 11 days
- Korean calendar: 4051
- Minguo calendar: 194 before ROC 民前194年
- Nanakshahi calendar: 250
- Thai solar calendar: 2260–2261
- Tibetan calendar: མེ་མོ་བྱ་ལོ་ (female Fire-Bird); 1844 or 1463 or 691 — to — ས་ཕོ་ཁྱི་ལོ་ (male Earth-Dog); 1845 or 1464 or 692

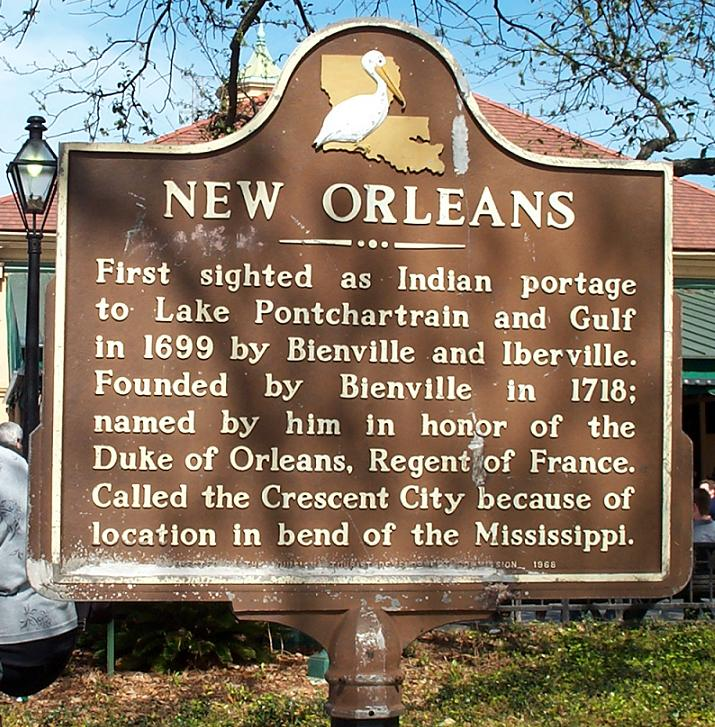
May 7: New Orleans

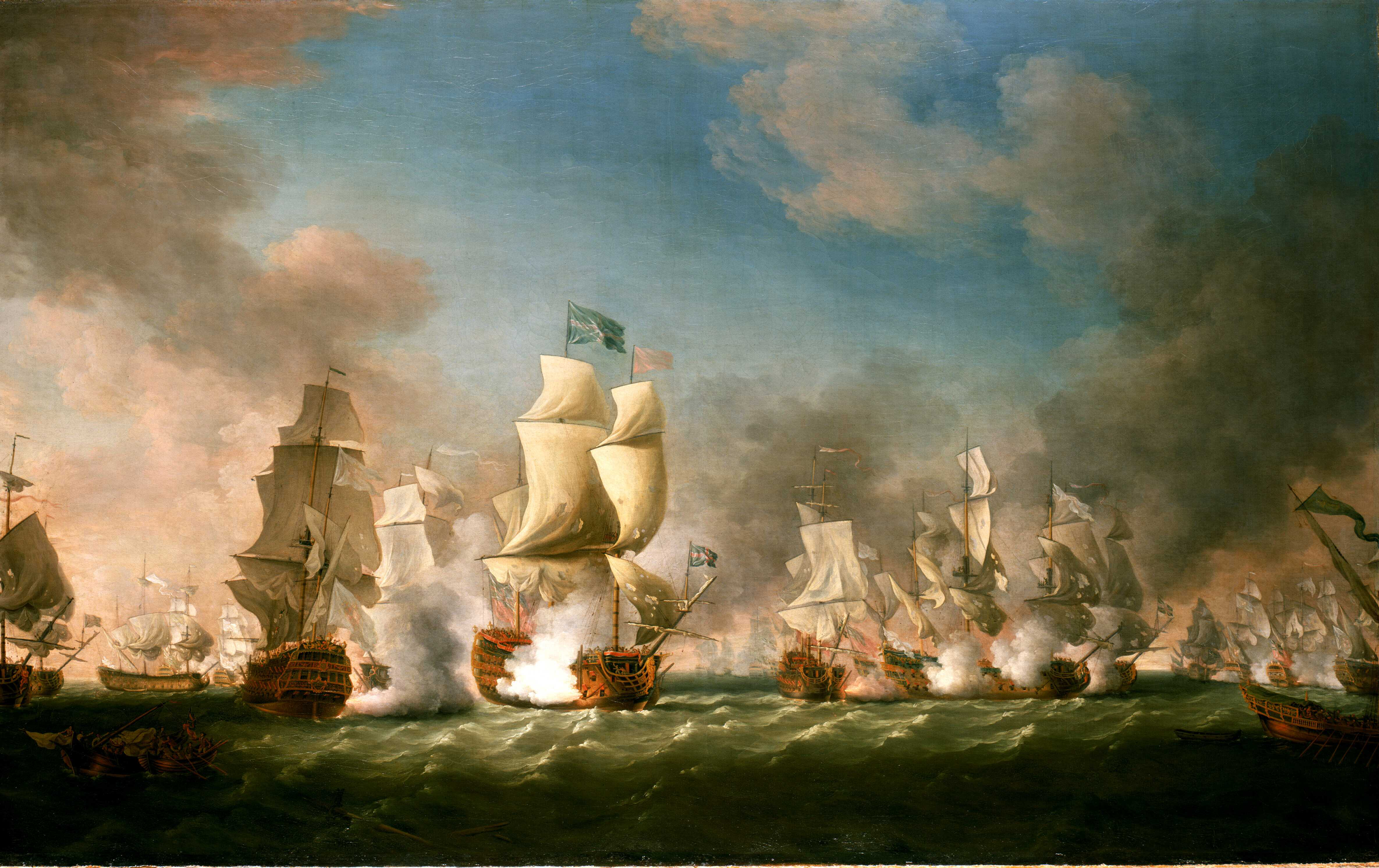
August 11: Battle of Cape Passaro

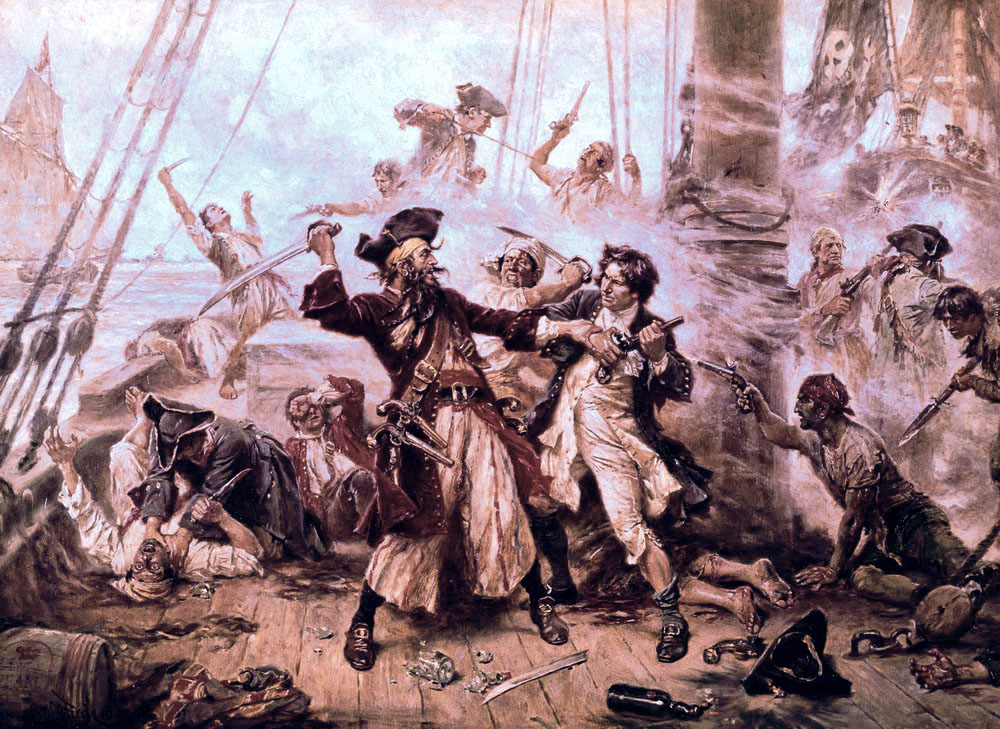
November 22: Blackbeard is killed

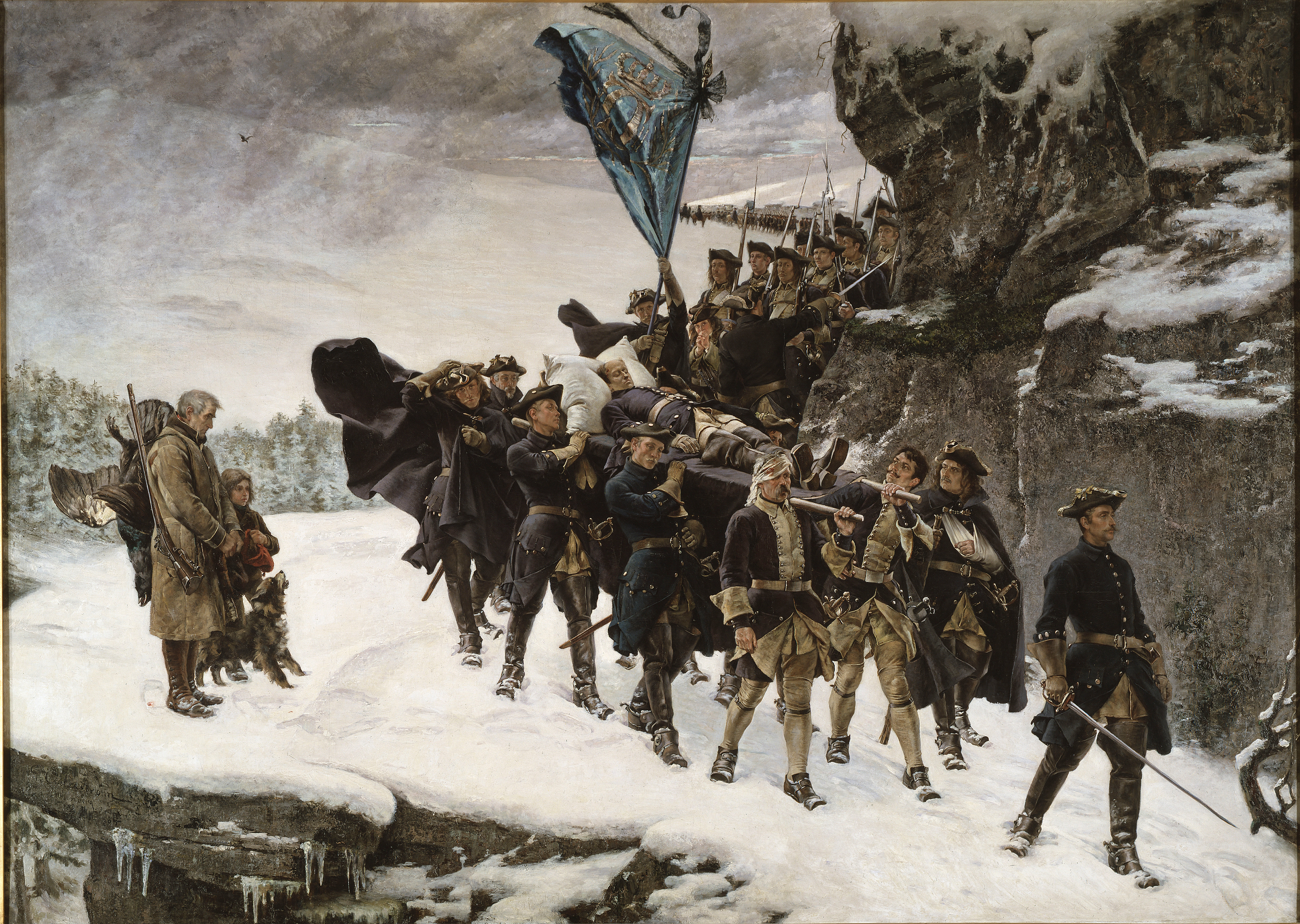
December 11: Charles XII of Sweden is killed at the Siege of Fredriksten

1718 (MDCCXVIII) was a common year starting on Saturday of the Gregorian calendar and a common year starting on Wednesday of the Julian calendar, the 1718th year of the Common Era (CE) and Anno Domini (AD) designations, the 718th year of the 2nd millennium, the 18th year of the 18th century, and the 9th year of the 1710s decade. As of the start of 1718, the Gregorian calendar was 11 days ahead of the Julian calendar, which remained in localized use until 1923.

== Events ==
=== January – March ===
- January 7 – In India, Sufi rebel leader Shah Inayat Shaheed from Sindh who had led attacks against the Mughal Empire, is beheaded days after being tricked into meeting with the Mughals to discuss peace.
- January 17 – Jeremias III reclaims his role as the Ecumenical Patriarch of Constantinople, chief leader within the Eastern Orthodox Church, 16 days after the Metropolitan Cyril IV of Pruoza had engineered an election to become the Patriarch.
- February 14 – The reign of Victor Amadeus over the principality of Anhalt-Bernburg (within the modern-day state of Saxony-Anhalt in northeastern Germany) ends after 61 years and 7 months. He had ascended the throne on September 22, 1656. He is succeeded by his son Karl Frederick.
- February 21 – Manuel II (Mpanzu a Nimi) becomes the new monarch of the Kingdom of Kongo (located in western Africa in modern-day Angola) when King Pedro IV (Nusamu a Mvemba) dies after a reign of 22 years. Manuel reigns until 1743.
- March 12 – Anton Florian becomes the new Prince of Liechtenstein, succeeding Joseph Wenzel
- March 13 – Daniel Overbeek becomes the new Dutch Governor of Ceylon (the modern-day nation of Sri Lanka), arriving after a 10-month sea voyage from the Netherlands.
- March 18 – Edward Wortley Montagu, the four-year-old son of the British Ambassador to Turkey, becomes the first British person to be inoculated with the smallpox vaccine, administered by Dr. Charles Maitland at the request of Edward's mother, Lady Mary Wortley Montagu.
- March 20 – The Privy Council of the United Kingdom is reorganized, forming the Second Stanhope–Sunderland ministry. Secretary of State for the Northern Department Charles Spencer, 3rd Earl of Sunderland succeeds James Stanhope as the new First Lord of the Treasury, and Stanhope takes Sunderland's job.

=== April – June ===
- April 4 – Great Britain, France and the Dutch Republic agree on the phasing out of the authority of the House of Medici over the semi-independent Grand Duchy of Tuscany by declaring that Gian Gastone de' Medici will be the last of the Medici family to rule the Italian duchy and that Spain's House of Borbón will eventually control the Tuscan monarchy. Don Carlos of Spain, the two-year old son of King Philip V, is designated as the eventual heir, despite the objections of the 75-year old Grand Duke, Cosimo III de' Medici.
- May 1 – San Antonio in what later becomes Texas is founded by Father Antonio de San Buenaventura y Olivares with the construction of the initial Mission San Antonio de Valero.
- May 7 – The settlement of New Orleans is founded in New France.
- May 22 – Sailing the Queen Anne's Revenge English pirate Edward Teach, known as Blackbeard, leads 400 sailors in four ships, and blockades the port of Charleston, South Carolina for an entire week, plundering all arriving ships. After their departure, Queen Anne's Revenge and Adventure are both lost at Beaufort Inlet, North Carolina; a week later. Blackbeard allows Stede Bonnet to command the Revenge (which is renamed the Royal James) once again. Bonnet rescues 25 sailors abandoned by Blackbeard on a sandbar and continues his life of piracy.
- June 3 – Pirates Blackbeard and Stede Bonnet accidentally run aground in the ship Queen Anne's Revenge after sailing into Topsail Inlet in the British colony of North Carolina. Learning of the royal pardon available to all pirates who surrender before September 5, Teach negotiates a settlement with Colonial Governor Charles Eden for a pardon for himself, Bonnet and the rest of his crew in return for the Governor receiving some of the pirates' plunder.
- June 16 – The Treaty of Baden is signed, ending the Toggenburg War.
- June 19 – A 7.5 earthquake shakes Tongwei County in China, killing 73,000 people.

=== July–September ===
- July 21 – The Treaty of Passarowitz, ending the Austro-Turkish War, is signed.
- July 25 – At the behest of Tsar Peter the Great, the construction of Kadriorg Palace, dedicated to his wife Catherine, began in Tallinn.
- August 11 – Battle of Cape Passaro: a Spanish fleet is defeated by the British Royal Navy under Admiral George Byng, off Capo Passero, Sicily, a prelude to the War of the Quadruple Alliance.
- September 10 – In France, Armande Félice de La Porte Mazarin and the Vicomtesse de Polignac, both mistresses of the Duc de Richelieu, fight a duel with pistols at the Bois de Boulogne near Paris. Lady Mazarin, who had initiated the duel, is wounded in the shoulder and both survive. Richelieu, though impressed by the willingness of the ladies to fight over his affections, comments Je ne sacrifierai pas un de mes cheveux, ni à l’une, ni à l’autre ("I will not sacrifice anything, not to one, nor to the other.")
- September 27 – The Battle of Cape Fear River begins as pirate Stede Bonnet and his crew on the Royal James are confronted in North Carolina by Colonel William Rhett and the ships Henry and Sea Nymph.
- September – In Tibet, forces of the Tibetan Dzungar Khanate destroys an advancing expedition of the Chinese Imperial Army, under the command of General Erentei, in the Battle of the Salween River.

=== October –December ===
- October 3 – Stede Bonnet and his crew are captured near the mouth of the Cape Fear River and taken to Charleston, South Carolina, where they are tried for piracy. All but four are found guilty and sentenced to death (with 22 hanged on November 8), but Bonnet escapes from prison on October 24.
- October 31 – The Mughal Emperor of India, Farrukhsiyar, restores the titles and responsibilities of his chief adviser, Mir Jumla III, almost three years after dismissing him.
- November 11 – Lightning strikes the powder magazine at the Old Fortress, Corfu, causing an explosion that kills a large number of people on the island.
- November 18 – Voltaire's first play, Oedipus, premières at the Comédie-Française in Paris. This is his first use of the pseudonym.
- November 22 – Citing violations of the amnesty agreement with Blackbeard, Virginia Governor Alexander Spotswood sends a Royal Navy contingent to North Carolina, where they battle Blackbeard and his crew in Ocracoke Inlet. Blackbeard is killed in action, after receiving five musketball wounds and twenty sword lacerations.
- December 4 – Fifty people are killed, and 150 houses burned, when a fire breaks out in Wapping, London. The blaze comes two days after a fire at the Spring Gardens at St. James's, London, which destroyed the French Chapel there and which was put out by several rescuers, including the future King George II.
- December 10 – Pirate Stede Bonnet is hanged at Charleston, after being recaptured.
- December 11 (November 30 Old Style) – King Charles XII of Sweden is killed at the Siege of Fredriksten in the Great Northern War, the last European monarch to die on a battlefield. His death ends the first era of absolute monarchy in Sweden. Five days later, when the news reaches Stockholm, his sister Princess Ulrika Eleonora proclaims herself Queen regnant of Sweden.
- December 17 – The Holy Roman Empire, Kingdom of Great Britain and Dutch Republic join the Kingdom of France in formally declaring war on Spain, launching the War of the Quadruple Alliance.

=== Date unknown ===
- Islamization of Sudan: The Funj warrior aristocracy deposes the reigning mek and places one of their own ranks on the throne of Sennar.
- The white potato reaches New England from England.
- Coffee is grown in Surinam (Dutch colony).

== Births ==
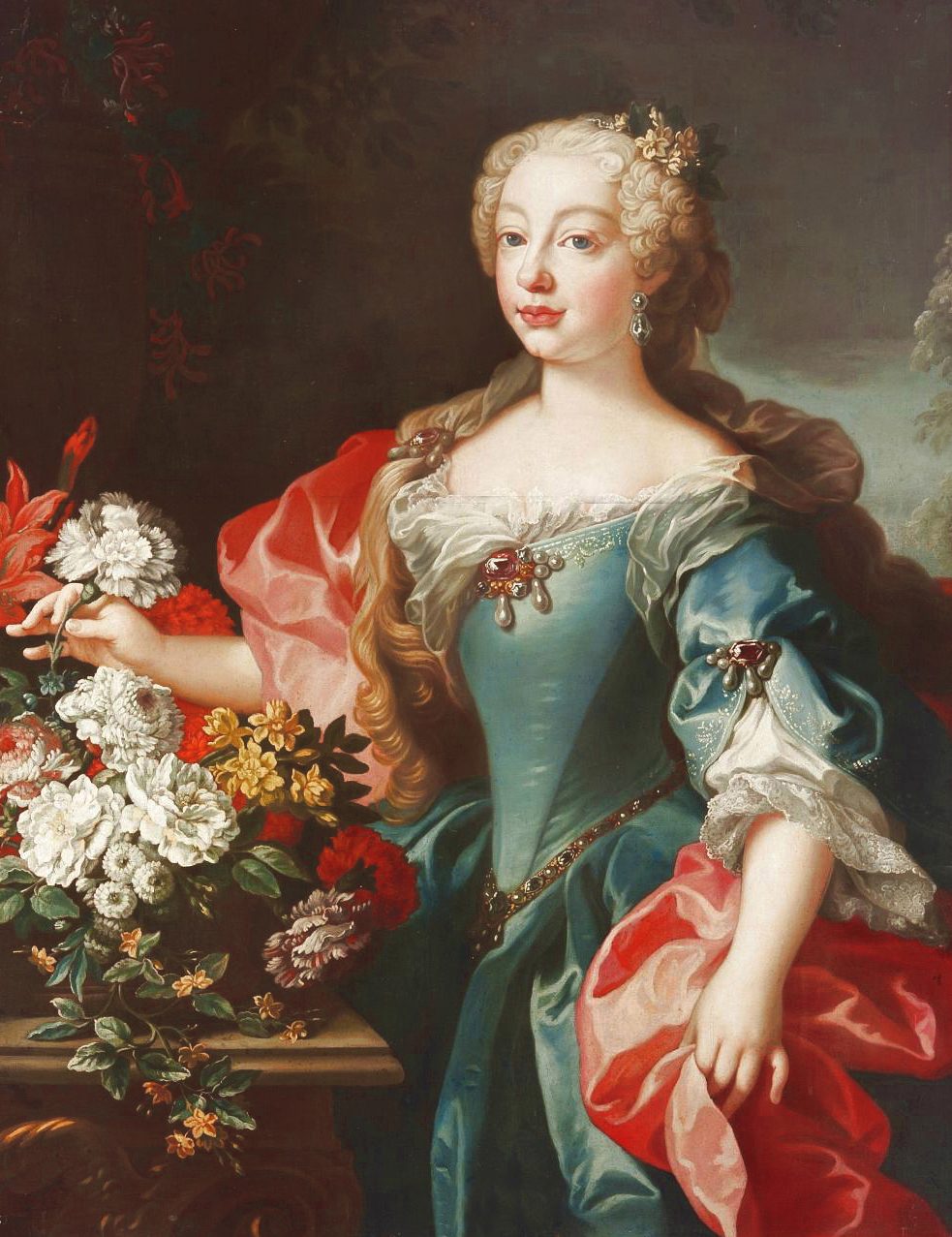
Infanta Mariana Victoria of Spain

- January 7 – Israel Putnam, American Revolutionary War general (d. 1790)
- January 29 – Paul Rabaut, French Huguenot pastor (d. 1794)
- February 17 – Matthew Tilghman, American delegate to the Continental Congress (d. 1790)
- March 31 – Infanta Mariana Victoria of Spain, queen regent of Portugal (d. 1781)
- April 4 – Benjamin Kennicott, English churchman and Hebrew scholar (d. 1783)
- April 7 – Hugh Blair, Scottish preacher and man of letters (d. 1800)
- April 20 – David Brainerd, American missionary (d. 1747)
- April 24 – Nathaniel Hone, Irish-born painter (d. 1784)
- April 26 – Esek Hopkins, American Revolutionary War admiral (d. 1802)
- April 27 – Thomas Lewis, Irish-born Virginia settler (d. 1790)
- May 16 – Maria Gaetana Agnesi, Italian mathematician (d. 1799)
- May 17 – Robert Darcy, 4th Earl of Holderness, English diplomat and politician (d. 1778)
- May 23 – William Hunter, Scottish anatomist (d. 1783)
- May 30 – Wills Hill, 1st Marquess of Downshire, English politician (d. 1793)
- May 31 – Jacob Christian Schäffer, German inventor, botanist and professor (d. 1790)
- June 5 – Thomas Chippendale, English furniture maker (d. 1779)
- June 17 – George Howard, British field marshal (d. 1796)
- July 5 – Francis Seymour-Conway, 1st Marquess of Hertford, Viceroy of Ireland (d. 1794)
- July 18 – Saverio Bettinelli, Italian writer (d. 1808)
- July 31 – John Canton, English physicist (d. 1772)
- August 11 – Frederick Haldimand, Swiss-born British colonial governor (d. 1791)
- September 18 – Nikita Ivanovich Panin, Russian statesman (d. 1783)
- October 19 – Victor-François, 2nd duc de Broglie, Marshal of France (d. 1804)
- October 2 – Louisa Catharina Harkort, German ironmaster (d. 1795)
- October 28 – Ignacije Szentmartony, Croatian Jesuit missionary and geographer (d. 1793)
- November 3 – John Montagu, 4th Earl of Sandwich, English statesman (d. 1792)
- November 28 – Hedvig Charlotta Nordenflycht, Swedish writer (d. 1763)
- date unknown
  - István Hatvani, Hungarian mathematician (d. 1786)
  - Salomée Halpir, Lithuanian oculist (year of death unknown)

== Deaths ==
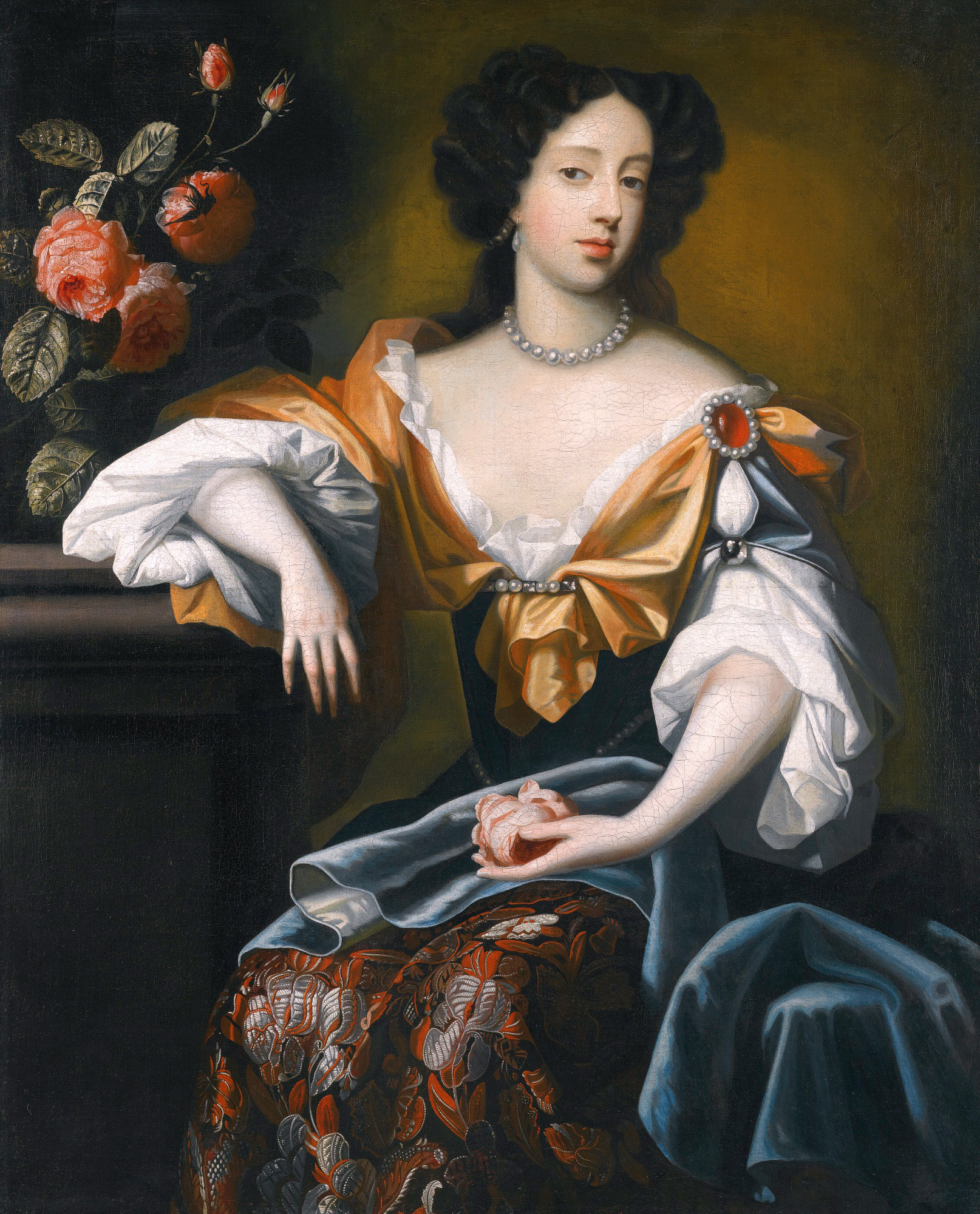
Mary of Modena

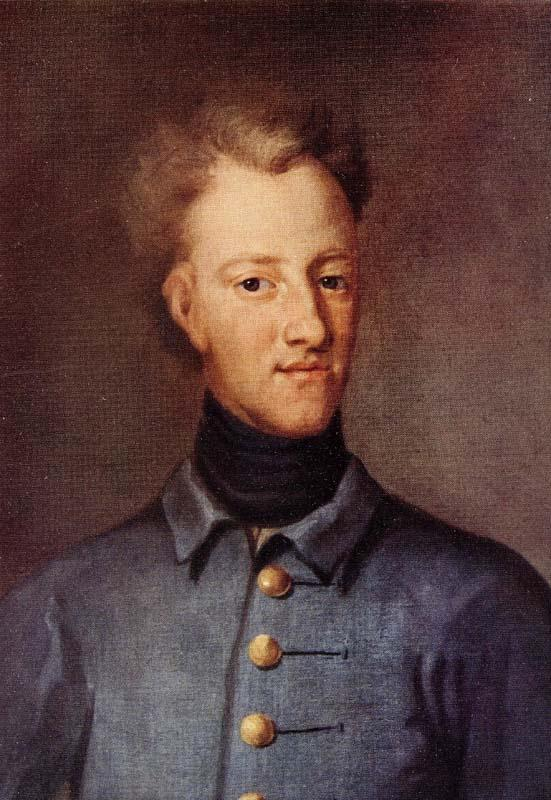
Charles XII of Sweden

- January 6
  - Giovanni Vincenzo Gravina, Italian writer and jurist (b. 1664)
  - Richard Hoare, English goldsmith and banker (b. 1648)
- January 7 – Empress Xiaohuizhang, Qing Dynasty empress and consort of the Shunzhi Emperor of China (b. 1641)
- January 17 – Captain Benjamin Church, Plymouth Colony settler and military officer (b. c. 1639)
- February 1 – Charles Talbot, 1st Duke of Shrewsbury, English politician (b. 1660)
- February 5 – Elizabeth Capell, Countess of Essex, British countess (b. 1636)
- February 17
  - Charlotte Lee, Countess of Lichfield, illegitimate daughter of King Charles II of England (b. 1664)
  - Prince George William of Great Britain, member of the British Royal Family (b. 1717)
- February 18 – Pierre Antoine Motteux, French-born English dramatist (b. 1663)
- March 9 – Marko Gerbec, Carniolan physician, scientist (b. 1658)
- March 13 – Friedrich Nicolaus Bruhns, German organist and composer (b. 1637)
- March 28 – Thomas Micklethwaite, Lord Commissioner of the Treasury (d. 1678)
- April 3 – Jacques Ozanam, French mathematician (b. 1640)
- April 18 – Michael Wening, German engraver (b. 1645)
- April 21 – Philippe de La Hire, French mathematician and astronomer (b. 1640)
- April 23 – Sir Edward Blackett, 2nd Baronet, English politician (b. 1649)
- May 7 – Mary of Modena, queen of James II of England (b. 1658)
- May 19 – Juan Andrés de Ustariz, Royal Governor of Cuba (b. 1656)
- May 16 – Jonas Danilssønn Ramus, Norwegian priest and historian (b. 1649)
- May 24 – Jeremiah Dummer, American silversmith (b. 1643)
- May 30
  - Arnold Joost van Keppel, 1st Earl of Albemarle, Dutch favorite of William III of England (b. 1670)
  - Bernard Nieuwentyt, Dutch mathematician and philosopher (b. 1654)
- June 9 – Jonathan Corwin, American judge of the Salem witch trials (b. 1640)
- June 13 – Louis, Count of Armagnac, French noble (b. 1641)
- June 17
  - Margherita Maria Farnese, Italian noblewoman (b. 1664)
  - James Tyrrell, English barrister and writer (b. 1642)
- July 21 – Shabbethai Bass, Polish rabbi, author of Siftei Chachamim and founder of Jewish bibliography (b. 1641)
- July 28 – Étienne Baluze, French scholar (b. 1630)
- July 30 – William Penn, American settler, founder of Pennsylvania (b. 1644)
- August 2 – Al-Mahdi Muhammad, Yemeni imam (b. 1637)
- August 4 – René Lepage de Sainte-Claire, lord-founder of Rimouski in eastern Quebec, Canada (b. 1656)
- September 11 – Domenico Martinelli, Italian architect (b. 1650)
- September 12 – Louise de Maisonblanche, illegitimate daughter of Louis XIV of France (b. 1676)
- September 20 – George St Lo, Royal Navy officer and administrator (b. 1655)
- October 9 – Richard Cumberland, English philosopher (b. 1631)
- October 19 – Alphonse Henri, Count of Harcourt, French noble (b. 1648)
- November 3 – Karl, Prince of Anhalt-Zerbst (b. 1652)
- November 22
  - Blackbeard, English pirate (killed) (b. 1680)
  - Durgadas Rathore, Indian ruler (b. 1638)
- December 6 – Nicholas Rowe, English poet and dramatist (b. 1674)
- December 9 – Vincenzo Coronelli, Italian cartographer and encyclopedist (b. 1650)
- December 10 – Stede Bonnet, Barbadian "gentleman pirate" (hanged) (b. 1688)
- December 11 (November 30 Old Style) – King Charles XII of Sweden (shot during siege) (b. 1682)
- December 28 – Jan Brokoff, German sculptor (b. 1652)
- date unknown – Marie Grubbe, Danish countess (b. 1643)
