= Daniel Porter (pirate) =

British pirate

- Years active: 1718–1721
- Known for: Associations with Benjamin Hornigold and Bartholomew Roberts
- Piratical career
- Base of operations: Caribbean

Daniel Porter (fl. 1718–1721) was a pirate and trader active in the Caribbean. He is best known for his associations with Benjamin Hornigold and Bartholomew Roberts.

== History ==
Daniel Porter was involved with pirate Benjamin Hornigold, possibly as early as 1716. His brother Thomas Porter was a known crew member of Hornigold’s sloop Bennett, and was formerly master aboard Daniel Porter’s sloop Mayflower. Porter took the general pardon offered by King George in 1717 to all pirates who surrendered within a year.

Charleston pirate and merchant Richard Tookerman traded supplies between South Carolina and the Caribbean with the assistance of Porter, whose brother owned property in the state as well. Tookerman was arrested and released for his role in helping Stede Bonnet escape prison, then arrested again for robbing William Rhett, the militia Colonel who’d helped capture Bonnet both times. Tookerman escaped and fled to Virginia and then to Barbados. By June 1720 he was sailing with the Porters aboard the Mayflower.

Porter and Tookerman approached Bartholomew Roberts soon after, asking for supplies and advice on taking up piracy. The two "addressed the Pyrate, as the Queen of Sheba did Solomon, to wit, That having heard of his Fame and Achievements, they had put in there to learn his Art and Wisdom in the Business of pyrating, being Vessels on the same honourable Design with himself; and hoped with the Communication of his Knowledge, they should also receive his Charity, being in want of Necessaries for such Adventures. Roberts was won upon by the Peculiarity and Bluntness of these two Men and gave them Powder, Arms, and what ever else they had Occasion for, spent two or three merry Nights with them, and at parting, said, he hoped the Lord would Prosper their handy Works.” Roberts and his men referred to them as “private pirates” – men whose fortune was made trading with pirates rather than engaging in any actual piracy of their own.

Roberts claimed that he had been approached by two sloops, not one. Bahamas Governor Woodes Rogers wrote in July 1720 that he was suspicious of two pirates who’d sailed quickly after loading crew under a supposed commission from New York Governor Robert Hunter; one was Porter, the other a Captain named Fox. That August they captured another sloop out of New York and raided settlements near Saint-Domingue. Porter and Fox were soon joined by a third pirate named Miller.

Rumors heard by Rogers during a visit to Charleston in 1721 told that Tookerman and Porter had turned to piracy together, which the Roberts encounter agrees with. In Port Royal later that year Tookerman was arrested for firing a salute on King James II’s birthday, outing himself as a Jacobite; he was sent to London for trial then returned to America, though he died at sea soon after. Tookerman was acting as master of Captain Wells' sloop Adventure at the time, so Porter may have replaced Tookerman with his own brother Thomas by then; Daniel Porter’s further activities are not well recorded.

== See also ==
- Charles Vane – Rhett had been looking for Vane when he found Stede Bonnet.
- Richard Worley – Caught just after Bonnet; Rhett refused to help capture him, though a ship of Tookerman's was involved.
