= Ireson =

Ireson can mean these men:

- Benjamin "Flood" Ireson, (c.1775 – after 1808), a 19th-century American sailor, captain of the schooner Betsy
- Nathaniel Ireson (1685 – 18 April 1769), a potter and mason from Wincanton working in Somerset, England
- Craig Ireson, (in Manukau, New Zealand 1976), a performance poet based in Wellington, New Zealand, also known as The Karaoke Poet
