= Ignatius Pell =

18th Century Pirate

- Occupation: Pirate
- Known for: Boatswain to Captain Stede Bonnet
- Piratical career
- Battles: Battle of Cape Fear River

Ignatius Pell was a pirate who served as the boatswain to Captain Stede Bonnet aboard the Royal James, a ship previously named Revenge. He was arrested in October 1718 and testified against his crew and captain.

== Battle of Cape Fear River ==
While waiting out the Atlantic hurricane season in the estuary of Cape Fear River, Ignatius took part in a battle between Bonnet's pirate vessel Royal James and two pirate hunters, the Henry and its accompanying sloop, commanded by William Rhett and commissioned by South Carolina governor Robert Johnson. Both sides ran aground, leaving only the Henry in range of the Royal James.

Despite the early advantage belonging to the pirates, changing tides freed the Henry first. Realizing they were trapped and outnumbered, Captain Bonnet ordered the gunpowder magazine blown in order to scuttle the Royal James. This order was belayed by the crew and the pirates surrendered to Rhett. Along with the rest of the pirates, Ignatius Pell was arrested and brought to Charleston, South Carolina on 2 October 1718.

== Trial and testimony ==
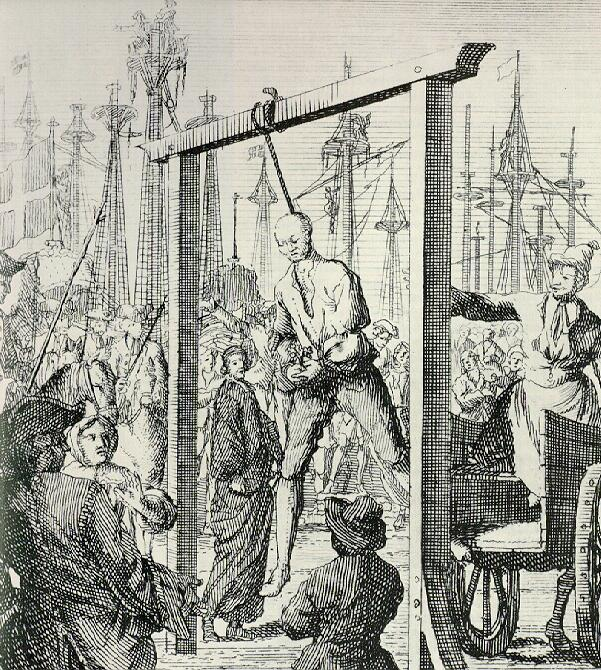
Depiction of Stede Bonnet's execution

Upon arriving in Charleston Pell was separated from the rest of the crew and held in the provost marshal's house alongside Captain Bonnet and the sailing master, David Herriot. However, Bonnet and Herriot soon escaped, leaving Pell behind for unknown reasons.

In the manhunt that followed Herriot was killed and Bonnet quickly recaptured, but the event evidently left an impression on Pell. He turned King's evidence and agreed to testify against the crew of the Royal James and against Stede Bonnet personally. In his testimony, he confirmed the acts of piracy committed by the crew, though he made a point of exonerating a man named Thomas Nichols, claiming he had been pressed into service against his will and did not engage in the fighting. He also stated that Bonnet was captain in name only, the true authority on the Royal James being quartermaster Robert Tucker. He unsuccessfully attempted to argue that Bonnet was therefore not responsible for the acts of piracy his crew had committed.

Due in part to Pell's testimony, most of the crew (except Nichols) were convicted and sentenced to death. Despite Pell's efforts to mitigate his crimes, Stede Bonnet was also convicted and hanged on 10 December 1718. Pell may have returned to piracy; a newspaper article from 1724 reported Pell in command of a 12-gun pirate vessel of his own off the American east coast.

== See also ==
- Admiralty court, the venue in which Bonnet, Pell, and others were tried.
- Blackbeard, Stede Bonnet's mentor with whom he sailed (or was held) for a time.
