= David Herriot =

Ship's master & pirate (??–1718)

- Died: December 1718; Sullivan's Island, South Carolina
- Cause of death: Gunshot wound
- Occupations: Ship’s master and pirate
- Known for: Serving under Blackbeard and Stede Bonnet
- Criminal penalty: Pardoned
- Piratical career
- Commands: Adventure

David Herriot (died 1718, occasionally Herriott) was a ship's master and pirate best known for serving under Blackbeard and Stede Bonnet.

== History ==
Herriot was master of the 80-ton 8-gun Jamaican logwood hauler Adventure when it was captured by Edward “Blackbeard” Teach in early 1718 near the Turneffe Islands. Herriot joined Blackbeard’s crew, while Teach placed his associate Israel Hands in command of the Adventure. Captain Stede Bonnet of the Revenge had also joined Blackbeard recently, recuperating after being wounded fleeing a Spanish warship.

During his later trial Herriot would testify that Blackbeard intentionally grounded his flagship Queen Anne’s Revenge at Topsail Inlet in order to break up his growing fleet and escape with all its collected loot. The Adventure was also grounded and lost while trying to reach the Queen Anne's Revenge. Bonnet’s boatswain Ignatius Pell confirmed his testimony, though historians still debate the matter. During the incident Herriot and a number of others were put ashore while Teach sailed away in a captured sloop with all their treasure.

Bonnet resumed his command of the ship Revenge (renamed Royal James), rescuing Teach’s stranded crew and taking Herriot with him as his new sailing master. Bonnet tried to chase down the fleeing Teach but missed him and plundered merchant vessels throughout July instead.

Merchants of South Carolina had armed two sloops under Colonel William Rhett to hunt down pirate Charles Vane. Rhett missed capturing Vane and engaged Bonnet instead, capturing him and the Royal James’ crew in September 1718 at Cape Fear. Back in Charleston in late October, Herriot testified against Bonnet in exchange for clemency, along with Pell.

Despite his pardon, Herriot escaped from jail alongside Stede Bonnet with the help of corrupt local merchant Richard Tookerman. That November in the marshes of Sullivan’s Island, Bonnet was recaptured by Rhett while Herriot and two others were shot and killed. Bonnet was hanged in Charleston in December 1718.

== See also ==
- Turneffe Atoll - the location where Blackbeard captured Herriot's ship
