= Battle of Cape Fear River =

1718 naval battle in the Cape Fear River

- Part of the Golden Age of Piracy
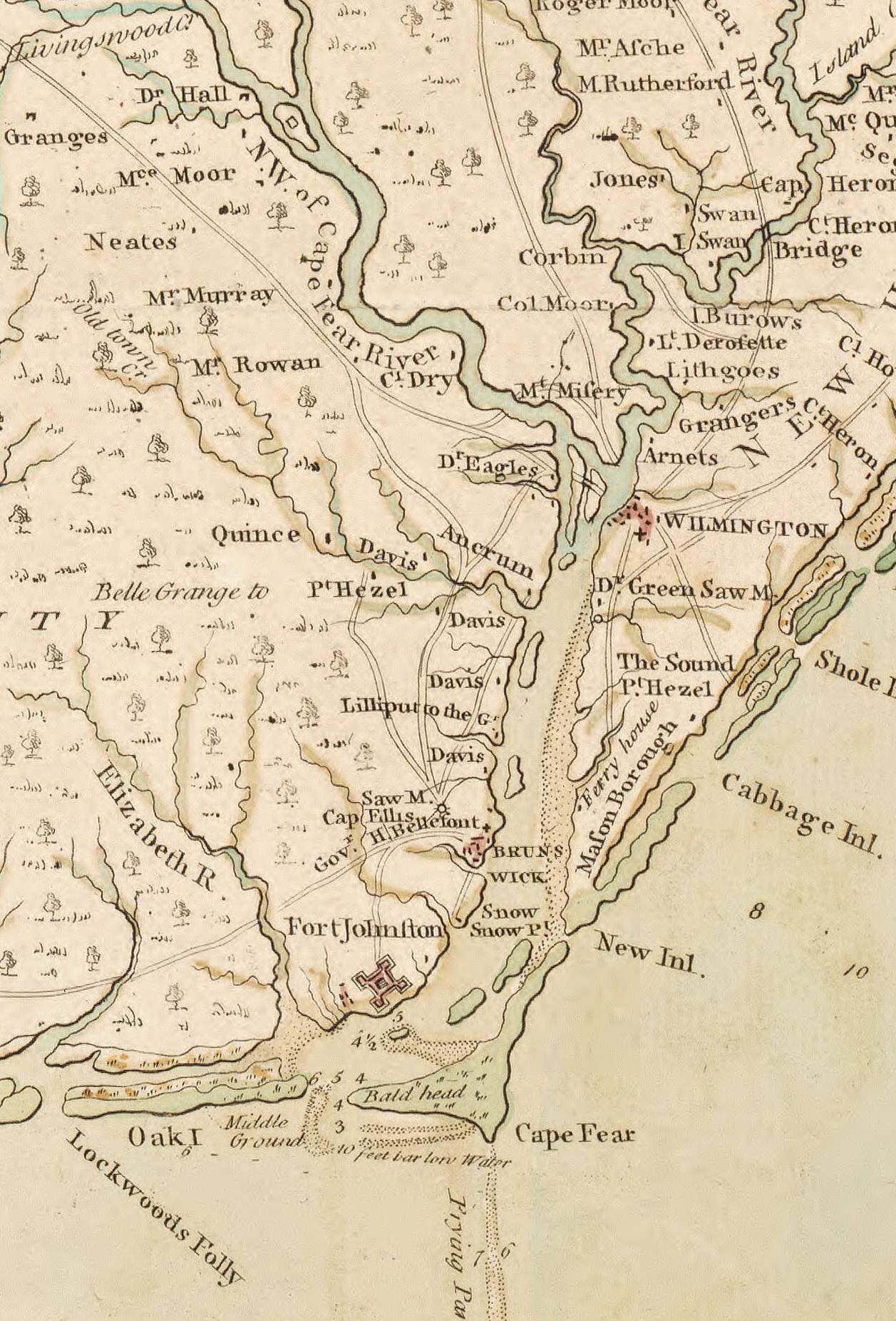
- An 18th-century map of the Cape Fear River
| Date | September 26–27, 1718 |
| Location | Cape Fear River, North Carolina 33°53′8″N 78°0′46″W |
| Result | British victory |

Belligerents
| South Carolina | Pirates |

Commanders and leaders
| William Rhett | Stede Bonnet (surrendered) |

Strength
| 2 sloops | 3 sloops 3 canoes |

Casualties and losses
| 30 killed and wounded | 12 killed and wounded 41 captured 3 sloops captured 3 canoes captured |

The Battle of Cape Fear River, also known as the Battle of the Sandbars, was fought in September 1718 between two sloops from the Province of South Carolina led by William Rhett and a group of pirate ships under the command of Stede Bonnet. Rhett's sloops defeated the pirates in the Cape Fear River estuary which led to Bonnet's eventual execution by hanging in Charleston, South Carolina.

== Background ==
During the end of the Golden Age of Piracy, the Royal Navy was constantly in campaign against pirates in the Caribbean and off North America. Stede Bonnet was a very successful pirate, having captured several merchant ships and assembled his own squadron of pirate ships. In August 1718, Bonnet was sailing from the Delaware Bay to the Cape Fear River. He commanded his sloop-of-war flagship Royal James and two other armed sloops, Francis and Fortune. Royal James was a former flagship of Blackbeard which was armed with eight cannons.The other two sloops were similarly armed. All together, 46 pirates crewed them. Royal James was in need of careening and the hurricane season was soon to come so Bonnet chose the Cape Fear estuary as a reliable shelter against storms. For the next few weeks, Bonnet's crew repaired the Royal James with material salvaged from a captured shallop.

In late August, reports of Bonnet's sloops in the Cape Fear River reached South Carolina governor Robert Johnson. Johnson ordered Colonel William Rhett to command an operation to destroy the pirate threat. He did not have regular Royal Navy sailors under his command, but locally raised sailors from Charleston, South Carolina. At Rhett's disposal were two eight-gun sloops with a combined complement of 130 men.

== Battle ==
A memorial in Charleston commemorating the execution of Bonnet

Rhett's ships reached the Cape Fear River estuary on the night of September 26, 1718, and was sighted by Bonnet and his men. Believing the sloops to be that of merchants, the pirates boarded three canoes and headed for the unrecognized South Carolinian expedition. It was at this time that Rhett's flagship, Henry, ran aground on a sandbar. This allowed the canoes to approach close enough to discover the identity of the grounded vessel. Once they did they turned about and paddled back to their ships unharmed.

Instead of fleeing up the small river in darkness, Bonnet decided that he would fight his way back to the sea, so the next morning at daylight, the pirates prepared to pass the two sloops, which were now free of the sandbar. They dispersed amongst Royal James, Fortune and Francis and loaded their arms. At daylight the following morning, Bonnet raised his flag and attacked. They sailed for a few minutes until they came within range of the enemy ships, then opened fire with cannon and muskets. The sloops returned fire and split up, but Henry ran aground again along with the other ship. To avoid enemy fire, Stede Bonnet steered his vessels close to the western shore of the river, and they ran aground on sand.

At this point, only Henry and Royal James were within range of each other. For five to six hours, the two sides dueled, each unable to move. Henry was grounded in a position which left her crew with minimal cover from incoming fire. The opposite was true for Royal James, whose hull provided a bulwark against enemy fire. During the fighting, Bonnet stayed on deck with his pistol in hand and warned that he would shoot any man who showed cowardice. The pirates' morale was good though; they cheered each other on and dared the South Carolinians to board. After five hours of fighting the South Carolinians had suffered 30 casualties, with nine pirates also killed or injured.

The sloops were downstream, and when the water began to rise in the early afternoon, they were freed, while Bonnet's ships remained stranded. Rhett's ships repaired their rigging and raised their sails. Soon after, Henry was in a position to fire its starboard guns directly onto the deck of Bonnet's Royal James. Bonnet ordered his gunner George Ross to light the powder magazine and scuttle Royal James, but he was persuaded not to by his surviving crewmen who had already surrendered. After another few moments of conflict, Royal James was boarded and its crew captured.

== Aftermath ==
The South Carolinians suffered twelve killed and eighteen wounded, while the pirates sustained twelve casualties and all the survivors were captured. Bonnet was taken to Charleston, arriving on October 3 to await trial on charges of piracy. Bonnet was separated from the majority of his crew and held for almost a month at the home of a Charleston provost marshal. With him was his boatswain, Ignatius Pell, and the sailing master, David Herriot, Bonnet and Herriot escaped with the help of two slaves and a Native American and possibly local merchant Richard Tookerman. Governor Robert Johnson immediately ordered a £700 bounty to be awarded to any man who could kill or capture the pirates. Herriott was shot and killed on Sullivan's Island a few days later and Bonnet, the Gentleman Pirate, was soon recaptured after a skirmish on Sullivan's Island and hanged on December 10, 1718.
