= William Fox (pirate) =

- Years active: 1718-1723
- Piratical career
- Type: Pirate, Guarda costa
- Base of operations: Caribbean; African coast

William Fox (fl. 1718–1723) was a pirate active in the Caribbean and off the African coast. He was indirectly associated with a number of more prominent pirates such as Bartholomew Roberts, Edward England, and Richard Taylor.

== History ==
Fox's early career is not recorded. He was among a large number of pirates (including Benjamin Hornigold, Paulsgrave Williams, Francis Leslie, Richard Noland, and more) who accepted King George's 1717 offer of pardon to all pirates who gave themselves up within a year. He did so at New Providence in the Bahamas, possibly surrendering to Captain Pearse of HMS Phoenix, who had sailed to the Caribbean to deliver news of the pardon.

By July 1720 he had returned to piracy, joining up with Daniel Porter to embark a fresh crew. They sailed under the pretense of a privateering commission from Governor Robert Hunter of New York. Governor Woodes Rogers of the Bahamas wrote, "…Capts. Porter and Fox has left us since wth. about 60 men and I hear are gone under a coppy of a New York Commission from Govr. Hunter … I wish they may do no mischief for they began very suspiciously by lying near us and stealing as many men as they could from the shore yt. were not permitted to depart these Islands." Within a year they had attacked both ships and plantations in the area and had attracted another pirate named Miller to their flotilla. Captain Edward Vernon was stationed in the vicinity at the time; frustrated at the growing pirate presence, he wrote of them, "Their names are Porter and Fox, who were formerly pirates that surrendered themselves at Providence and took the benefit of the King's last pardon but are now returned to their old courses, and I verily believe such rogues are never to be reclaimed but by a halter."

The next appearance of Fox is aboard the former East Indiaman Cassandra, which had been captured in the Indian Ocean by Edward England. After England was deposed from his command it was captained by Olivier Levasseur, who then traded it to England's associate Richard Taylor. Fox may have crossed the Atlantic with Porter and joined them on the return trip: Porter was known to be in the vicinity at the time, meeting with Bartholomew Roberts alongside fellow pirate Richard Tookerman. Taylor, Fox, and others had sailed back to the Caribbean and petitioned the English for a pardon but had been marked as pirates; they were rebuffed and were refused permission to land or trade. Instead they surrendered Cassandra to the Spanish in Panama in 1723 in exchange for a pardon.

Fox's further activities are not known. Other English Captains who had sided with the Spanish (including Richard Noland, who'd taken the King's Pardon on New Providence alongside Fox) were known to have continued to sail as guarda costa privateers in Spanish service.

== See also ==
- George Bond, Philip Fitzgerald, and John Bear – three other English captains who, like Noland, sailed in Spanish service.
