= Edward Miller (pirate) =

- Occupation: Pirate
- Years active: 1718-1720
- Piratical career
- Base of operations: Caribbean

Edward Miller (fl. 1718–1720) was an English pirate active in the Caribbean.

== History ==
King George offered a full pardon in September 1717 to all pirates who surrendered within twelve months. Captain Vincent Pearse sailed HMS Phoenix to New Providence to deliver the offer. Over 200 pirates surrendered to him in March 1718, including Miller.

Miller had returned to piracy by 1720. Authorities in New York accused him of piracy early that year, after which he sailed to Nassau. Royal Navy Captain Edward Vernon had been stationed in the area at the time and noted that an English warship had chased Miller away, preventing him from putting into port to resupply. A few months later Vernon accused a Port Royal tavern keeper of smuggling supplies and sailors to Miller.

Vernon believed that Miller was planning on joining forces with Daniel Porter and William Fox, who had also accepted the King's Pardon and returned to piracy. Porter and Fox attacked ships and plantations in the area; later Porter, along with Richard Tookerman, met with Bartholomew Roberts to ask him for advice and supplies. Miller's fate, and whether Miller was with Porter during any or all of these events, is not known.

== See also ==
- Francis Leslie and John Auger – Two other pirates who accepted the 1717 pardon but soon returned to piracy.
