= Nicholas Trott =

British judge (1663–1740)

- Born: 19 January 1663; Lewisham, London, England
- Died: 21 January 1740 (aged 77); London, England
- Occupations: Judge, writer and legal scholar
- Known for: Colonial magistrate and chief justice in South Carolina; tried pirate Stede Bonnet in 1718.
- Parent: Samuel Trott
- Relatives: Perient Trott, grandfather Sir Nicholas Trott, uncle William Rhett, brother-in-law

Nicholas Trott (19 January 1663 – 21 January 1740) was an 18th-century British judge, legal scholar and writer. He had a lengthy legal and political career in Charleston, South Carolina and served as the colonial chief justice from 1703 until 1719. He came from a prosperous English family; his grandfather Perient Trott having been a husband of the Somers Isles Company and his uncle Sir Nicholas Trott served as the governor of the Bahamas. Like his nephew, the governor was involved in dealings with pirates, and so, to avoid confusion, is often referred to as Nicholas the Elder.

Though he is best known, as recorded in Daniel Defoe's A General History of the Pyrates, as the magistrate who tried notorious pirate Stede Bonnet in 1718, he was the author of several published books including a lexicon of the psalms Clavis Linguae Sanctae (1719), The Tryals of Major Stede Bonnet and Other Pirates (1719) and The Laws of the British Plantations (1721) for which he was awarded a Doctor of Civil Law degree from Oxford University and a Doctor of Laws degree from the University of Aberdeen. His final published work, The Laws of the Province of South Carolina (1736), chronicled the early legal and judicial history of Charleston up until 1719.

== Biography ==
=== Early life and legal career ===
Nicholas Trott was born in Lewisham, London, England, to Samuel Trott, a successful London merchant. His grandfather, Perient Trott, was a husband of the Somers Isles Company, the chartered company which was involved in the early colonization of Bermuda. His uncle Sir Nicholas Trott (or Nicholas the Elder) served as governor of the Bahamas.

Trott was educated at Merchant Taylor's School in London. In part due to his family's connections, he was appointed secretary to the Somers Isles Company and attorney general of Bermuda in 1693. He married his first wife, Jane Willis, in Bermuda a year later. In 1695, Trott became a member of the Inner Temple, one of London's four Inns of Court, which served as centers of learning for training lawyers. Returned to Bermuda the following year, he took the office of attorney general and by all accounts "served ably" in that post.

=== Chief justice in South Carolina ===
In 1699, Trott left Bermuda for Charleston, South Carolina to become attorney general and naval officer in the colony. He had been offered this post by Edward Randolph, then surveyor general of the colonies. Trott's political and legal career was, while successful, also wrought with controversy due to his partisan political and religious views. His criticism of Joseph Blake, who had succeeded the previous governor John Archdale in 1696, resulted in Trott's arrest and removal from office. He was eventually restored to his former position by the colonial assembly in 1702 and was appointed chief justice the next year.

An ardent supporter of the Church of England, he was early member of the Society for the Propagation of the Gospel. He was also involved with other Anglicans to establish the Church of England within the colony and suppress the religious dissenters. This religious factionalism ended with the appointment of Charles Craven in 1712. Trott, along with his brother-in-law William Rhett, both had considerable support within the colonial assembly and resisted Craven's policy of tolerance. Trott and Rhett may have been protected by Richard Shelton, another highly influential figure in the colony.

For four years, between 1711 and 1715, he and Rhett successfully sought to expand their powers though the Charleston electorate, the colonial governing body which elected the majority of the colonial assembly members. Trott visited England in 1714 where he was given "extraordinary legal powers" by the colony proprietors which included his right to appoint a provost marshal, though his presence was required in order to hold a quorum in the colonial council, and no additional laws could be passed without his approval. These powers were revoked two years later; however, this did not prevent him from seeking to increase his power in the colony. By the time of his appointment as vice admiralty judge in 1716, he and Rhett controlled virtually all of the royal and proprietary offices in South Carolina.

=== Trial of Stede Bonnet ===
In 1718, Trott gained a certain degree of notoriety when he served as Vice Admiralty Judge during the trial of Captain Stede Bonnet and his crew. Trott published a transcript of the trial, entitled The Tryals of Major Stede Bonnet and Other Pirates, that provided extensive details of the trial and was included as a primary source document in prominent collections of state trials published in the eighteenth and nineteenth centuries. His "comprehensive and detailed definition of piracy" was used by many other Vice Admiralty Judges of the day and helped shape the legal definition of piracy. His work was frequently cited in public international law into the nineteenth and twentieth centuries.

=== Retirement and later years ===
By 1719, Trott had become very unpopular among his contemporaries and a formal complaint to the colony proprietors was made against him that year. These charges included claims that "he collected exorbitant fees in his courts, multiplied fees by delays in the proceedings, abused his office as judge by advising parties in cases pending before him, and monopolized the colony's political and judicial offices". This coincided with the fall of the proprietary government that same year, although Trott and Rhett activities were not considered to have been a contributing factor. The main reasons for replacing the proprietary government was their perceived failure to protect the colony from Indian raiding parties. The English government agreed to provide the colony with adequate protection and sent Francis Nicholson to act as royal governor. Shortly after his arrival, he restored all former proprietary officials with Trott as the only exception. Trott petitioned to have his office restored but eventually gave up.

Some scholars regard Trott's removal to have been a formal impeachment. Some scholars disagree however.

Afterwards, Trott retired from public service and spent the rest of his life as a prolific legal scholar and writer. His works included, aside from his own memoirs of the Bonnet trial, a lexicon of the psalms Clavis Linguae Sanctae (1719) and The Laws of the British Plantations (1721). For these, he was awarded a Doctor of Civil Law degree by Oxford University in 1720 and a Doctor of Laws degree from the University of Aberdeen in 1726. His last published work, The Laws of the Province of South Carolina (1736), included a collection of provincial laws during his time as colonial magistrate. It is considered one of the earliest and most important documents in early legal and judicial history of colonial South Carolina.

After the death of Jane Willis, Trott married Sarah Rhett, the widow of William Rhett, in 1727. He spent the last years of his life, according to personal correspondence and his later obituary from the South Carolina Gazette, explicating the Hebrew text of the Bible which has apparently been lost. He died in London on 21 January 1740, at the age of 77. He left small bequests to his "two grandchildren Sarah and Mary Jane Rhett", descendants of his second wife by her first marriage, but apparently had no children of his own.

== Legacy ==
Trott is considered to have been a highly important figure in the early history of South Carolina. Historian M. Eugene Sirmans has referred to him as "the most learned man in the colony". Aside from his involvement in the colonial assembly with William Rhett, Trott made important contributions to the legal development of South Carolina. His work as chief justice and later as a scholar illustrated the early development of American colonial law.

One such example was a legal essay he authored, "Eight Charges", which featured a manuscript collection of grand jury charges and instructed jurors on the law and its applications in criminal cases. One of the charges referenced a Charleston defense case for the crime of witchcraft, for which, indictments were sought but had been rejected "specter evidence". In this essay, Trott warned that "proof of witchcraft based on corroboration by evil spirits was by no means is to be relied on".
