= Craig Ireson =

New Zealand poet (born 1976)

Craig Ireson (born in Manukau, New Zealand 1976) was a Wellington-based, New Zealand performance poet, also known as The Karaoke Poet.

Ireson was the organiser of the Wellington Word Collective, a community oriented collective of Wellington poets that produced the Wellington Word Festival (2003-2005) and Newtown Spoken Word, a Wellington Fringe Festival event. The Word Collective's only regular spoken word event was "Howltearoa", a monthly open mic night at the Southern Cross Bar, on Cuba Street, Wellington.

Craig Ireson collaborated with Shane Hollands following a chance encounter at Thistle Hall on Cuba Street in 2003. Craig and Shane's common appreciation for Beat Poetry led to Holland's Literatti, including Miriam Barr and Murray Haddow becoming regular performers with the Word Collective.

Ireson wrote, produced and performed in two award-winning poetry shows: the Sk8Board Poets;(Best of the Fringe-Wellington Fringe Festival 2004) and Karaoke Poetry (Best Spoken Word and Best of the Fringe-Wellington Fringe Festival 2005) Karaoke Poetry was first staged at BATS Theatre and reprised there in May 2005. A stripped back solo version was also performed at the National Library of New Zealand for their Main Trunk Lines Poetry Exhibition, July 2005.

Ireson and Andy 'The Pirate' Coombs opened for the Belfast Touring Group's 2008 tour to Australia/New Zealand, performing at the Happy bar in 2007.

Craig Ireson ceased performing poetry professionally in 2008.
