= Major Penner =

Pirate captain

- Occupation: Pirate
- Years active: 1718
- Piratical career
- Rank: Major
- Base of operations: Caribbean
- Commands: Bonetta

Major Penner (fl. 1718) was a pirate captain active in the Caribbean.

== History ==
Governor Woodes Rogers arrived at New Providence in the Bahamas in 1718 to offer and enforce King George’s 1717 proclamation of pardon for any pirates who turned themselves in within a year. Little is known of Penner’s activities, except that he accepted the King’s pardon in 1718 and retired. Penner is mentioned as one of the pirate “Commanders” present on New Providence at the time, alongside Benjamin Hornigold, Charles Vane, and other better-known pirates. He eventually returned to piracy and was soon killed, and the crew of his 36-gun ship Bonetta captured. He preferred to keep the title Major in preference to the traditional Captain.

== See also ==
- Stede Bonnet, another pirate who preferred to be styled Major rather than Captain.
- Captain in Calico, an historical novel by George MacDonald Fraser featuring Penner.
