= Miriam Barr =

New Zealand poet

Miriam Barr is a New Zealand page and performance poet.

She is one of the original members of The Literatti, an Auckland-based performance poetry group started in 2006. Barr became creative director for the group in 2007.

Her poetry has appeared in Landfall, Black Mail Press, Tongue in Your Ear, JAAM, De-Formed Paper, Enamel, Live Lines, Debate, The Wild Goose Poetry Review, Magazine, Brief, Takahe, and Poetry New Zealand (now Poetry NZ Yearbook).

She has self-published two volumes of poetry, Tangents, 2006 (now out of print) and Observations from the Poetry Factory, 2007. Both of these books were released with CDs of Barr's poetry set to music. Her collection, Bullet Hole Riddle was published by Steele Roberts Aotearoa in 2014.

In 2007 Barr created the free, independent poetry zine, Side Stream, which was distributed by a network of poets from around the world until its demise in 2011.

Barr has been one of the coordinators of Poetry Live since 2006. Poetry Live has been a gathering point for the Auckland poetry community since the early 1980s.

Barr was the winner of the 2007 Auckland Writers and Readers Festival Poetry Idol slam. She has performed widely, including at AK07, the 2007 Ubud Readers and Writers Festival, the Dunedin Fringe Festival, the Parihaka International Peace Festival, Montana Poetry Day, the Parnell Festival of Roses, the Auckland Fringe Festival and the Whangarei Midwinter Arts Festival. She has also collaborated with many visiting international poets, including acclaimed American slam poet Nikki Patin.

== Published poetry ==
- Bullet Hole Riddle. Steele Roberts Aotearoa. 2014. ISBN 978-1-927242-68-1.
- Observations from the Poetry Factory. Back Shed Press. 2007. ISBN 978-0-473125-27-1.
- Tangents : a collection of poetry. Back Shed Press. 2006. ISBN 978-0-473116-43-9.
