= Benjamin Ireson =

American ship's captain

Benjamin "Flood" Ireson (c. 1775 – after 1808) was a 19th-century American sailor, captain of the schooner Betsy. In 1808, during a gale, the Betsy was on its way from Grand Banks to home port when it discovered another ship, the Active, which was wrecked and taking on water. (Note: Note - the fate of the Active is disputed. Leonee Ormond's "Captains Courageous" notes state that four survivors from the Active returned, whereas Tyrone Power's Impressions of America (1836) claims that "contrary to all expectation, the crippled bark, after being given up as lost, reached the harbour".)

"Ireson tried to rescue the crew of the sinking vessel, but his own men insisted upon giving up an attempt which held considerable dangers. On return to Marblehead, the crew, finding themselves blamed for the loss of life, placed responsibility upon their captain." The people of Marblehead, the Betsy's home port, were outraged with Ireson, and he was tarred and feathered and dragged out of town in a cart.

John Greenleaf Whittier first heard the tale in 1823, and wrote a poem based on the incident, Skipper Ireson's Ride.

There was some question as to the identity of the person. In later retellings, it was "Floyd" Ireson who was punished. A series of letters in the Boston Evening Transcript in 1837 identified "Floyd" Ireson as Benjamin "Flood" Ireson. In retellings, his nickname, Flood, had become corrupted to Floyd.

"The inhabitants of Marblehead eventually recognized their mistake, but Whittier's poem served to perpetuate the original story."

The True Story of Skipper Ireson by Charles Buxton Going is a poetic rebuttal of Whittier's poem.

The 1941 film adaptation of The Devil and Daniel Webster names Ireson as one of the Jury of the Damned - "Floyd Ireson and Stede Bonnet, the fiendish butchers."
