= Louisa Catharina Harkort =

German ironmaster (1718–1795)

Louisa Catharina Harkort (1718–1795), was a German ironmaster. She founded the iron and export company Wittib Harkort, and became known as Die Märckerin.

Harkort married landowner Johann Caspar Harkort III (1716-1760) in 1748. She took over his estate as a widow. Between 1775-80, Harkort founded five iron works and became a major iron trader, exporting to Russia and along the Ruhr. The princess Abbess of Essen was one of her most important business partners. She played an important role in the industrialization of the Ruhr area.
