= Richard Tookerman =

English pirate, smugller, trader (1691–1723)

- Born: 16 May 1691; Devon, Cornwall, England
- Died: 1723 (aged 31–32); En route from the Caribbean
- Occupation: Pirate
- Known for: Involvement with pirates Stede Bonnet and Bartholomew Roberts
- Spouse: Katherine Grant
- Parent: Josias Tookerman
- Relatives: Josias Tookerman II
- Piratical career
- Other names: Tuckerman
- Base of operations: Caribbean and the Carolinas
- Commands: Sea Nymph

Richard Tookerman (1691–1723, last name also Tuckerman) was born on 16 May 1691 in Devon, Cornwall, England. He was the son of Josias Tookerman, a clergyman, and younger brother of Josias Tookerman II, a clergyman sent by the Society for the Propagation of the Gospel (SPG) to Jamaica. He married Katherine Grant, widow of John Grant of Charleston, South Carolina by 1717. As a pirate, smuggler, and trader active in the Caribbean and the Carolinas, he became best known for involvement with pirates Stede Bonnet and Bartholomew Roberts.

== History ==
Tookerman was born in England and grew up in Jamaica before moving to Charleston. He made his fortune making trading runs between the Carolinas and the Bahamas, supplying goods to the pirate-friendly colonies there. When Charleston merchants wanted to outfit two sloops in 1718 to hunt down pirates plaguing their waterways, one of the ones they commandeered was Tookerman's 50-ton, 8-gun Sea Nymph. They left it under the command of Tookerman’s acquaintance Fayrer Hall. The two sloops under Colonel William Rhett went looking for Charles Vane but instead found Blackbeard’s protégé Stede Bonnet. Hall was an experienced sailor but beached the Sea Nymph far from Bonnet’s ship, leaving him unable to help Rhett for most of the battle; speculation was that Tookerman advised or bribed Hall not to engage the pirates and risk damaging the Sea Nymph. Hall also used the Sea Nymph when Charleston again marshaled forces to capture pirates, this time Richard Worley in 1719.

Bonnet was captured and imprisoned, but escaped in October 1718 with his ship’s master David Herriot. Tookerman provided them with arms, canoes, and slave guides and they rowed out of the harbor, where strong winds forced them ashore at Sullivan’s Island. Rhett took a party to retrieve him; Herriot and the slaves were killed and Bonnet was returned to custody, after which he was tried and hung. Tookerman was suspected of helping Bonnet escape; the canoes and arms were his, and Bonnet reportedly had been promised that a sloop (Tookerman’s) would pick him up once he escaped. Governor Johnson imprisoned Tookerman but had to release him for lack of evidence. Tookerman was notoriously litigious, filing lawsuits and counter-suits against Rhett and many others.

In March 1719 Tookerman was arrested again, this time for receiving stolen property (which he had actually robbed from Rhett’s home). He escaped, fleeing first to Virginia and then back to Barbados. He soon sailed with fellow pirate Daniel Porter, who together with his brother Thomas Porter had been associates of Benjamin Hornigold. By June 1720 Tookerman and Porter were sailing aboard Porter’s sloop Mayflower. They approached Bartholomew Roberts for advice on taking to piracy. Roberts, amused by their request, gave them supplies and his blessing. Roberts also traded sailors with them, trading eighteen black slaves to them for four of their crew. He and his crew remarked that Tookerman and Porter were not typical pirates but were “private pirates” – those who made money trading with pirates without doing any real piracy of their own.

Governor Woodes Rogers noted rumors in 1721 that Tookerman had turned to piracy with Porter. Tookerman was arrested again in June of that year in Port Royal for firing a salute on King James II’s birthday, betraying his Jacobite sympathies. By this time he was serving as ship’s master aboard the Adventure under Captain Henry Wills. Tookerman was sent to London for trial but was granted a writ of Habeas Corpus allowing him to be tried in Charleston. Tookerman died en route home from the Caribbean in 1723.

== See also ==
- Admiralty court, the court venue which refused to try Tookerman in England.
- Nicholas Trott, the South Carolina Admiralty judge who presided over Bonnet's trial and Hall's subsequent lawsuit against Tookerman.
