= Stede Bonnet =

English pirate (1688–1718)

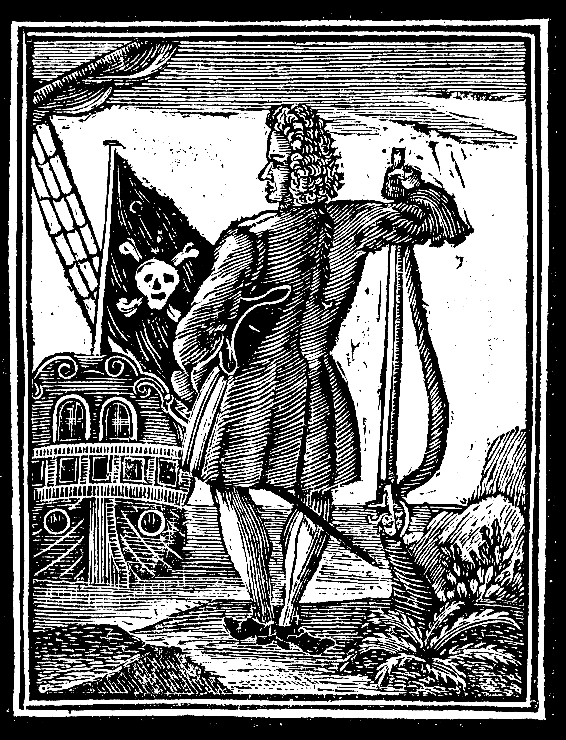
- Engraving of Bonnet with a Jolly Roger flag from A General History of the Pyrates (1724)
- Born: c. 1688; Bridgetown, Colony of Barbados, British West Indies
- Died: 10 December 1718 (aged 30); Charles Town, South Carolina, British America
- Cause of death: Execution by hanging
- Spouse: Mary Allamby (m. 1709)
- Children: Edward Bonnet, Allamby Bonnet, Stede Bonnet, Mary Bonnet
- Piratical career
- Nickname: The Gentleman Pirate, Captain Thomas
- Type: Pirate
- Allegiance: None
- Years active: 1717–1718
- Rank: Captain
- Base of operations: Atlantic Ocean, along East Coast of the British Colonies, and Caribbean Sea
- Commands: Revenge, later renamed Royal James
- Battles: Battle of Cape Fear River

Stede Bonnet (c. 1688 – 10 December 1718), (Note: All dates in this article are in the Old Style form used in Britain and her colonies during Bonnet's life, except that the new year is dated from 1 January.) known as the Gentleman Pirate, was an English pirate and landowner. Bonnet was born into a wealthy English family on the island of Barbados, and inherited the family estate after his father's death in 1694. Despite his lack of sailing experience, Bonnet decided he should turn to piracy and crime in the spring of 1717. He bought a sailing vessel, the Revenge, and travelled with his paid crew along the Eastern Seaboard of what is now the Eastern United States, capturing other vessels and burning other Barbadian ships.

Bonnet set sail for Nassau in the Bahamas, to the haven for pirates known as the "Republic of Pirates", but he was seriously wounded en route during an encounter with a Spanish warship. After arriving in Nassau, Bonnet met the infamous pirate Blackbeard, with whom he developed a close union despite initially being enemies. Incapable of leading his crew, Bonnet temporarily ceded his ship's command to Blackbeard. Before separating in December 1717, Blackbeard and Bonnet plundered and captured merchant ships along the East Coast. After Bonnet failed to capture the Protestant Caesar, his crew abandoned him to join Blackbeard aboard the Queen Anne's Revenge. Bonnet stayed on Blackbeard's ship as a guest, and did not command a crew again until summer 1718, when he was pardoned by North Carolina governor Charles Eden and received clearance to undertake privateering against Spanish shipping interests. Bonnet was tempted to resume his piracy but did not want to lose his pardon, so he adopted the alias "Captain Thomas" and changed his ship's name to Royal James. He had returned to piracy by July of 1718.

In August, Bonnet anchored Royal James on an estuary of the Cape Fear River to careen and repair the ship. In late August and September, Colonel William Rhett, with the authorisation of South Carolina's governor Robert Johnson, led a naval expedition against pirates on the river. Rhett's and Bonnet's men engaged in combat for hours, but the outnumbered pirates ultimately surrendered. Rhett arrested the pirates and brought them to Charles Town (now Charleston, South Carolina) in early October. Bonnet escaped on 24 October, but was soon recaptured on Sullivan's Island. On 10 November, Bonnet was brought to trial and charged with two acts of piracy. Judge Nicholas Trott sentenced him to death. Bonnet wrote to Johnson to ask for clemency, but Johnson endorsed the judge's decision, and Bonnet was hanged in Charles Town on 10 December.

== Pre-criminal life ==
Stede Bonnet was born in 1688, and he was christened at Christ Church parish on 29 July 1688. His parents, Edward and Sarah Bonnet, owned an estate of over 400 acres (160 ha) southeast of Bridgetown, Barbados, which was bequeathed to Bonnet upon his father's death in 1694. Bonnet received a good education, and lived as one of the richest and highest members of Bridgetown society. After his parents’ death, Bonnet was raised by his maternal grandfather and deputy secretary of Barbados, John Whetstone, who was son of Thomas Whetstone and grandnephew of Oliver Cromwell. Bonnet married Mary Allamby in Bridgetown on 21 November 1709. They had three sons – Allamby (who died by 1715), Edward, and Stede Jr – and a daughter, Mary. The three surviving children were all younger than five when their father abandoned them for piracy.

In the Oxford Dictionary of National Biography, historian Robert C. Ritchie suggests that Bonnet was driven to piracy to escape his bad marriage, or to "recapture his more adventurous youth". Details of Bonnet's military service are unclear, but he held the rank of major in the Barbados militia. (Note: Another of Bonnet's contemporaries who preferred to retain his military rank rather than be addressed as Captain was Major Penner.) Bonnet's militia service coincided with the War of the Spanish Succession, but there is no record that he took part in the fighting.

== Early career as a pirate ==
During the spring of 1717, Bonnet decided to become a pirate, despite having no knowledge of shipboard life. He contracted a local shipyard to build him a sloop, which he equipped with ten guns and named the Revenge. This was unusual, as most pirates seized their ships by mutiny, by boarding them, or by converting a privateer vessel to a pirate ship. Bonnet enlisted a crew of more than seventy men. He relied on his quartermaster and officer for their knowledge of sailing, and as a result, he was not highly respected by his crew. In another break from tradition, Bonnet paid his crew wages, not shares of plunder as most pirates did. After staying at anchor for several days, telling inquirers that he was going to use the Revenge for island trading, Bonnet departed Carlisle Bay, Barbados, under the cover of darkness.

Bonnet's initial cruise took him to the coast of the Colony of Virginia, near the entrance of the Chesapeake Bay, where he captured and plundered four vessels, and burned the Barbadian ship Turbes to keep news of his crimes from his home island. He sailed north to New York City, taking two more ships, and picking up naval supplies and releasing captives at Gardiners Island. Finding that New York was a less profitable hunting ground, by August Bonnet had returned to the Carolinas, where he attacked two more ships, a brigantine from Boston and a Barbadian sloop. He stripped the brigantine, but brought the cargo-filled Barbadian sloop to an inlet off North Carolina to use for careening and repairing the Revenge. After the Barbadian sloop's tackle was used to careen the Revenge, the ship was dismantled for timber, and the remains were burned. In September, Bonnet set course for Nassau, which was an infamous pirate den on the island of New Providence in the Bahamas. En route, he encountered, fought, and escaped from a Spanish man-of-war. The Revenge was badly damaged, Bonnet was seriously wounded, and half the crew of the sloop was killed or wounded in the encounter. Putting in at Nassau, Bonnet replaced his casualties and refitted the Revenge, increasing the sloop's armament to twelve guns.

== Collaboration with Blackbeard ==
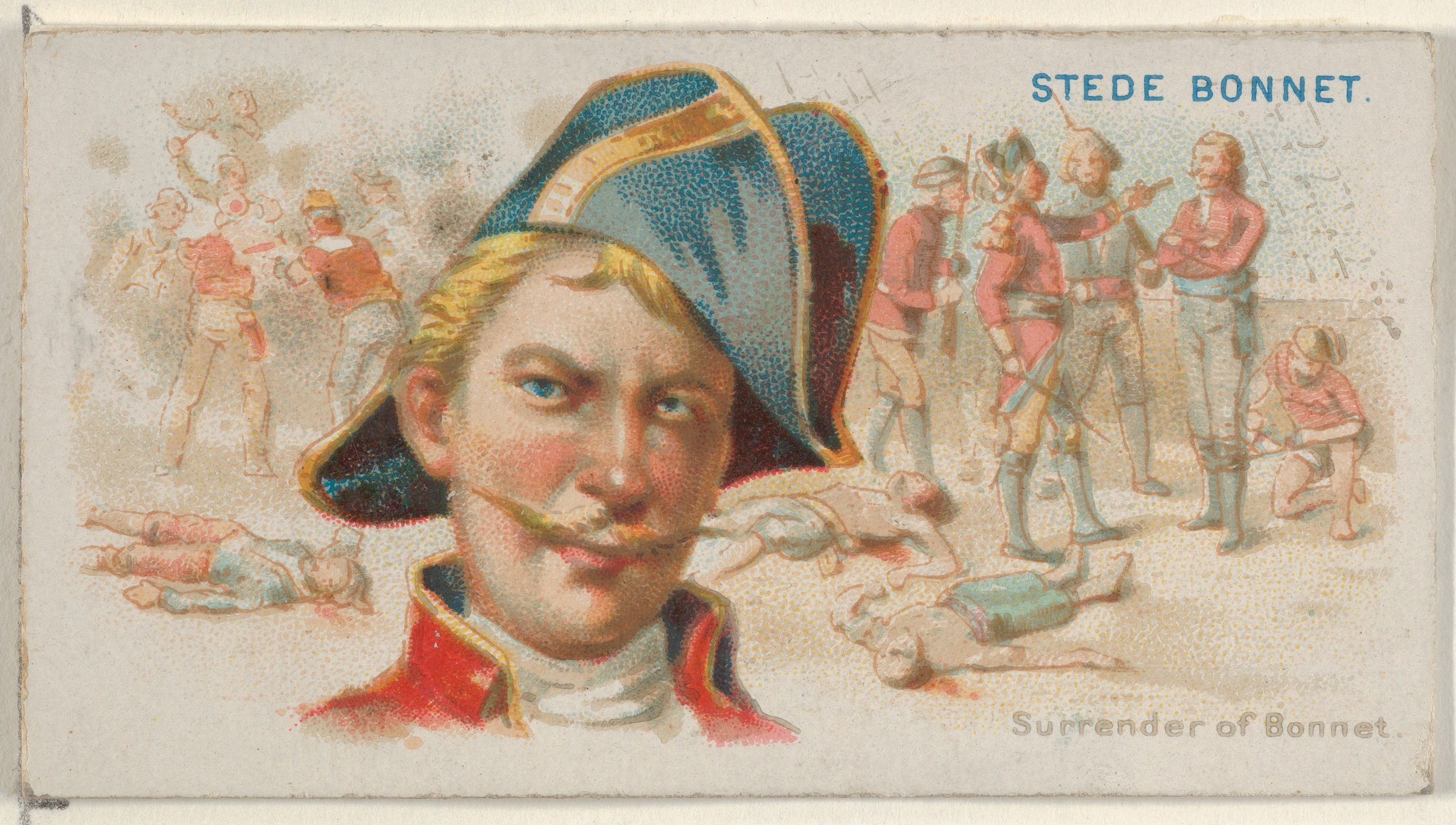
Stede Bonnet, Surrender of Bonnet, from the Pirates of the Spanish Main series (N19) for Allen & Ginter Cigarettes MET DP835004

While at Nassau, Bonnet met Captain Benjamin Hornigold and Blackbeard for the first time. Blackbeard and Bonnet struck up an unlikely friendship, and decided to cruise together, with Blackbeard taking command while Bonnet kept to his cabin, recovering from his wounds. The ship sailed northward to Delaware Bay, where they plundered eleven ships. On 29 September, the Revenge, captained by Blackbeard, plundered the sloop Betty, which had a cargo full of Madeira wine. Captain Codd, whose merchant ship was taken on 12 October, described Bonnet as walking the deck in his nightshirt, lacking any command and still unwell from his wounds. The Revenge later captured and looted the Spofford and Sea Nymph, which were leaving Philadelphia. On 22 October, the Revenge stopped and robbed the Robert and Good Intent of their supplies. On 17 November Blackbeard captured the French slave ship La Concorde which he took as his own, naming her Queen Anne's Revenge. Bonnet took back command of Revenge.

Some time after 19 December, Bonnet and Blackbeard separated. Bonnet sailed into the western Caribbean. On 28 March 1718, he encountered the 400-ton merchant vessel Protestant Caesar off Honduras. The ship escaped him, and his frustrated crew became restive. When Bonnet encountered Blackbeard again shortly afterwards at Turneffe Atoll, Bonnet's crew deserted him to join Blackbeard. Calling Bonnet on board his own ship, Blackbeard essentially imprisoned him, suggesting that as a gentleman he would prefer a life of leisure to that of command. Blackbeard put a henchman named Richards in command of the Revenge. Bonnet, surprised that his colleague had betrayed him, found himself as a guest aboard Blackbeard's ship, the Queen Anne's Revenge. Bonnet confided in a few loyal crew members that he was ready to give up his criminal life if he could exile himself in Spain or Portugal.

Under Richards, the Revenge captured a Jamaican sloop, the Adventure, captained by David Herriot, who joined the pirates. Bonnet accompanied Blackbeard to South Carolina, where Blackbeard's four vessels blockaded the port of Charles Town in the late spring. Needing a place to rest and refit his vessels, Blackbeard headed north to Topsail Island, where the Queen Anne's Revenge ran aground and was lost in June. With dissent rising amongst the pirates, Blackbeard allowed Bonnet to take command of the Revenge again. Leaving the remaining vessels at Topsail Island, Blackbeard and Bonnet went ashore and journeyed to Bath, which was the capital of North Carolina. Once there, both men accepted pardons from Governor Charles Eden under King George's Act of Grace, putatively on condition of their renouncing piracy forever. While Blackbeard quietly returned to Topsail Island, Bonnet stayed in Bath to get a "clearance" to sail the Revenge to Denmark's Caribbean colony of St. Thomas, where he planned to buy a letter of marque and go privateering against Spanish shipping. Eden granted Bonnet this clearance.

== Resumption of pirate command ==
Bonnet's flag was described in the Boston Newsletter in June 1718 as a "Death's Head." Bonnet's crew and contemporaries generally referred to him flying a "bloody flag"

Bonnet returned to Topsail Island to find that Blackbeard had sunk several of his pirate ships, taken all the loot, and robbed the Revenge and two other vessels of the squadron of most of their supplies, before sailing away. Bonnet then rescued seventeen pirates who had been marooned on a sand bar by Blackbeard for disagreeing with his plans.

Bonnet began to resupply the ravaged Revenge, having bumboats bring food on board from ashore. One of these informed Bonnet that Blackbeard was moored in Ocracoke Inlet with only eighteen pirates. Wanting to take revenge on Blackbeard, Bonnet set sail for Ocracoke, but missed Blackbeard's departure by several hours. Bonnet gave chase but failed to catch the other pirate. Although Bonnet apparently never discarded his hopes of reaching St. Thomas and getting his letter of marque, Blackbeard had stolen the food and supplies he and his men needed to subsist.

Hoping to preserve his pardon while returning to his pirate ways, Bonnet adopted the alias "Captain Thomas" and changed the Revenge's name to the Royal James. The name Royal James that Bonnet conferred on his sloop was possibly a reference to James Francis Edward Stuart, the son of the deposed James II of England who was at the time plotting to retake the throne of England from George I of Great Britain.

Bonnet further tried to disguise his return to piracy by engaging in a pretence of trade with the next two vessels he robbed. Soon afterward, Bonnet quit the charade of trading and reverted to naked piracy, encouraged by his crew. Cruising north to Delaware Bay, in July Bonnet pillaged several more vessels, totalling eleven since he had received his pardon. He took several prisoners, some of whom joined his pirate crew. While Bonnet set loose most of his prizes after looting them, he retained control of the last two sloops he captured.

During these operations the Royal James had begun to leak badly and was in need of careening. Bonnet sailed the ship to the Cape Fear River, a well-known pirate rendezvous, to undertake repairs which were estimated to require two months of work. Shortly afterwards, a small shallop entered the river and was captured. Bonnet had the shallop broken up to help repair the Royal James. The work of careening was done, in whole or in part, by the prisoners Bonnet had captured. Bonnet threatened at least one man with marooning if he did not work with the slaves to repair the Royal James. Bonnet remained in the Cape Fear River, intending to wait out the hurricane season there.

== Battle of Cape Fear River ==
Plaque to Stede Bonnet and his crew in Charleston, South Carolina

By the end of August, news had reached Charles Town that a pirate vessel was moored in the Cape Fear River. Robert Johnson, governor of South Carolina, authorised Colonel William Rhett to lead a naval expedition against the pirates, believing that North Carolina was in league with the pirates and would not do anything if left to combat them alone. After a false start due to the appearance of another pirate ship near Charles Town, Rhett arrived at the mouth of the Cape Fear River on 26 September with two eight-gun sloops, the Henry and the Sea Nymph, and a force of 130 militia men. Bonnet sent three canoes out to Rhett's ships and was disconcerted to learn that they were warships.

Bonnet planned to fight his way out to sea in the morning with his crew of 45. He also wrote a letter to Johnson, threatening to burn all the ships in Charles Town Harbour. At daybreak, on 27 September 1718, Bonnet set sail toward Rhett's force, and all three sloops opened fire, initiating the Battle of Cape Fear River. Rhett sailed his two ships towards the Royal James, forcing the pirate to stay in the shallow waters along the river. Royal James soon ran aground, but in the chase so did the South Carolinian vessels. The Sea Nymph was stuck too far away to be of use, leaving only the Henry in range of the Royal James.

The battle was at a stalemate for the next five or six hours, with all the participants immobilized. Bonnet's men had the advantage that their deck was heeled away from their opponents, giving them cover, while the Henry's deck was tilted toward the pirates, thus exposing Rhett's men to punishing musket volleys. Bonnet's force suffered twelve casualties while killing ten and wounding fourteen of Rhett's 70-man crew. Most of Bonnet's men fought enthusiastically, challenging their enemies to board and fight hand to hand, and tying a knot in their flag as a mock signal to come aboard and render aid. Nevertheless, some of the prisoners who had been forced to join the pirate crew refused to fire on Rhett's men, and one narrowly escaped death at Bonnet's hands in the confusion of the engagement.

The battle was ultimately decided when the rising tide lifted Rhett's sloops free while temporarily leaving the Royal James stranded. As the Henry closed with Bonnet's ship, his crew demanded that he surrender. Bonnet at first refused, saying that he would blow up the ship before surrendering, and threatening to shoot any man who did. Despite this, the crew won Bonnet over and a white flag was raised. After negotiations were shouted between the two ships, Bonnet agreed to surrender unconditionally. Rhett returned to Charles Town with his prisoners and the Royal James on 3 October.

== Escape, recapture, and execution ==
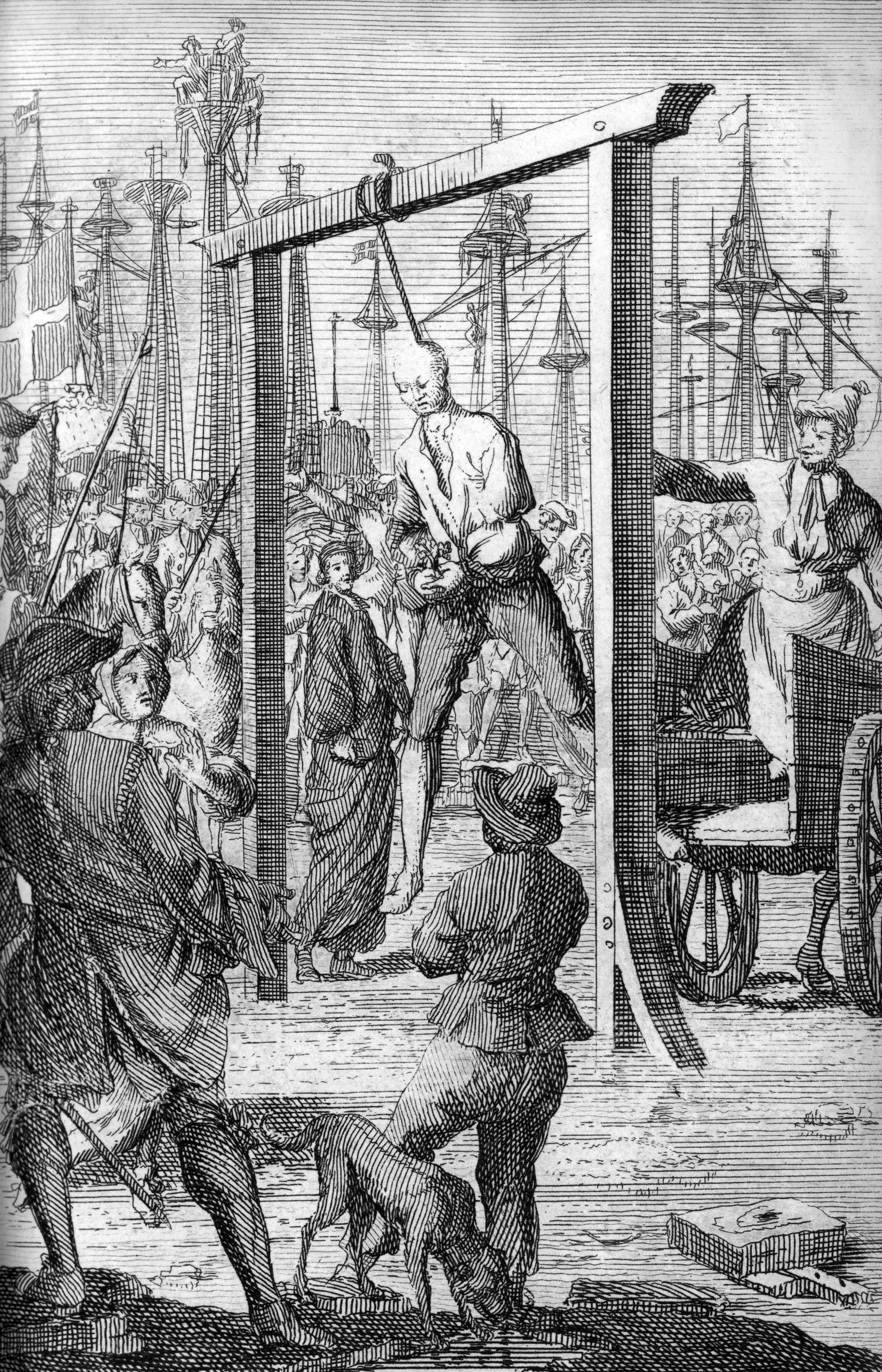
The hanging of Stede Bonnet in Charleston, 10 December 1718

In Charles Town, Bonnet was separated from the bulk of his crew and held for three weeks along with his boatswain, Pell, and his sailing master, Herriot, at the home of Town Marshal Nathaniel Partridge. The remaining crew were held outside of Charles Town at the public watchhouse, due to the town lacking an actual jail. On 24 October, Bonnet and Herriot escaped, probably by colluding with local merchant Richard Tookerman. Johnson at once placed a £700 bounty on Bonnet's head and dispatched search teams to track him down. Bonnet and Herriot, accompanied by a slave and a Native American who wanted to become pirates, obtained a boat and made for the north shore of Charles Town Harbour, but foul winds and lack of supplies forced the four of them onto Sullivan's Island. Johnson sent a posse under Rhett to Sullivan's Island to hunt for Bonnet.

The posse discovered Bonnet after an extensive search, and opened fire, killing Herriot and wounding the other two of Bonnet's followers. Bonnet surrendered and was returned to Charles Town, imprisoned in a safer location. While awaiting trial, some sort of civil uprising in his support took place within the city, an event authorities would later describe as having nearly resulted in the burning of the town and the overthrow of the government. Bonnet possibly awaited his execution in the Court of Guard, a militia guardhouse in the city where the Exchange and Provost stood as of 2007.

The Vice-Admiralty judge Nicholas Trott sat in judgment on Bonnet's crew and sentenced most of them to hang on 5 November, with Pell turning King's evidence against his fellow pirates. They were executed on 8 November. Bonnet was brought to trial before Trott two days later, and formally charged with two acts of piracy, against the Francis and the Fortune, whose commanders were on hand to testify against Bonnet in person. Bonnet pleaded not guilty to the offences but provided little defence for his actions. On 12 November, Trott sentenced Bonnet to death by hanging, using his final speech to recite Bonnet's crimes and suggest that in the afterlife he would be "in the lake which burneth with fire and brimstone, which is the second death".

Johnson decreed that Bonnet would be executed on 10 December. While awaiting this, Bonnet wrote to Johnson, begging abjectly for clemency and promising to become a "menial servant" to Johnson and his government if he was spared. He sent several other letters, including to Rhett who offered to take Bonnet to England for a re-trial if Johnson allowed it. Bonnet's visibly disintegrating mind moved many Carolinians to pity, particularly the female population, and London papers later reported that the governor delayed his execution seven times. Johnson stayed firm, and Bonnet was hanged at White Point, in Charles Town, on 10 December. After being cut down, his body was tossed alongside those of his crew into a nearby marshland below the low water mark. No marker was provided for the graves.

== Legacy ==
=== Bonnet's authority ===
A Jolly Roger associated with Stede Bonnet.

The actual degree of authority any pirate captain exercised over his crew was questionable, as he had no access to the procedures and sanctions of Admiralty law that supported government captains. Many pirate captains were elected by their crews and could be deposed in the same manner. At his trial, Bonnet downplayed his own authority over his pirate crew. He told the court that his crew engaged in piracy against his will, and said he had not given them consent to rob any vessels. The court did not accept these protestations. Pell testified that Bonnet's quartermaster, Robert Tucker, had more power than Bonnet. Despite this, at Delaware Bay Bonnet ordered two of his crew to be flogged for breaches of discipline. Pirates did not lightly submit to flogging, as they resented the frequent use of this punishment in the naval and merchant services from which most of them came.

=== Local legends ===
In Wilmington, North Carolina, a local legend states that Bonnet allegedly captured a former crewmate’s wife. During routine maintenance at Cape Fear, the crew decided to visit the plantation of a retired crewmate. The crewmate allowed them to partake in food, shelter and alcohol, but he had to travel away for business. In a drunken stupor, Bonnet ordered his men to capture the young wife and refused to listen to arguments against the act. She was bound and taken aboard, where the pirates immediately set sail to the mouth of the Cape Fear River. The crew released her bindings and allowed her free rein on deck, so they could focus their attentions on sailing. She jumped off the ship and swam to the Old Dram Tree to wait for her husband. The legend states that Bonnet and his crew never returned to the plantation in case of retaliation.

=== Walking the plank ===
Bonnet is alleged to have been one of the few pirates to make his prisoners walk the plank. The detailed record of his trial, however, makes no mention of this method of execution, and the historian Hugh F. Rankin argues that the idea is a modern fabrication. Marcus Rediker, Professor of History at the University of Pittsburgh, agrees that pirates were unlikely to make captives walk the plank, preferring either bloodless assaults or far more violent methods of murder.

=== In popular culture ===
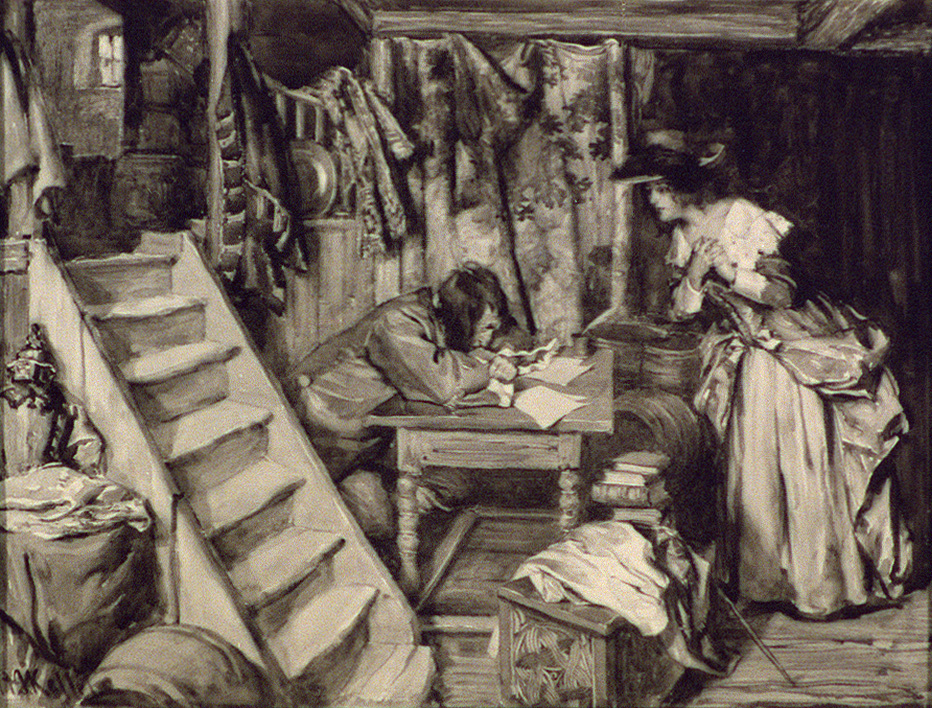
Bonnet and his fictional daughter, Kate (by Arthur Ignatius Keller, 1902)

Portrayals of Bonnet extend to video games, such as Sid Meier's Pirates! and Assassin's Creed IV: Black Flag. In the 1941 film The Devil and Daniel Webster, the Devil summons Bonnet to join a jury of the damned, announcing Bonnet and fellow seaman Floyd Ireson as "the fiendish butchers".

The period comedy television series Our Flag Means Death, created by David Jenkins, stars Rhys Darby as Bonnet and Taika Waititi as Blackbeard. Jenkins depicts a romantic relationship between the two.

== Bibliography ==
- Botting, Douglas (1978). The Pirates. Time-Life Books. ISBN 0-8094-2652-8.
- Bowden, Oliver (1 November 2013). Assassin's Creed: Black Flag. Penguin UK. ISBN 9780718193768.
- Butler, Lindley S. (2000). Pirates, Privateers, & Rebel Raiders of the Carolina Coast. Chapel Hill, North Carolina: UNC Press. ISBN 0-87169-240-6.
- Converse, Cris (2016). Assassin's Creed IV Black Flag Game Guide. Booksmango. ISBN 9781633235014.
- Cordingly, David (1996). Under the Black Flag: The Romance and Reality of Life Among the Pirates. New York: Random House. ISBN 0-679-42560-8.
- Fox, Edward Theophilus (2013). Piratical Schemes and Contracts: Pirate Articles and Their Society 1660-1730 (PhD). Exeter: University of Exeter.
- Geltzer, Jeremy (2017). Film Censorship in America: A State-By-State History. McFarland & Company. ISBN 9781476669526.
- Gosse, Philip (1924). The Pirates' Who's Who. New York: Burt Franklin. ISBN 1-60303-284-3.
- Johnson, Charles; Wetmore, Alexander (1724). A General History of the Pyrates, from their First Rise and Settlement in the Island of Providence, to the Present Time... (2 ed.). London: T. Warner.
- Pringle, Patrick (2001). Jolly Roger: The Story of the Great Age of Piracy. Mineola, New York: Dover Publications. ISBN 0-486-41823-5.
- Rankin, Hugh F. (1965). The Pirates of Colonial North Carolina. Raleigh: State Department of Archives and History.
- Rankin, Hugh F. (1969). The Golden Age of Piracy. New York: Holt, Rinehart, and Winston. SBN 03-081018-3.
- Ritchie, Robert C. (2008). "Bonnet, Stede". Oxford Dictionary of National Biography (online ed.). Oxford University Press. doi:10.1093/ref:odnb/61696. (Subscription, Wikipedia Library access or UK public library membership required.)
- Sanders, Joanne McRee, ed. (1982). Barbados Records: Marriages, 1693–1800. Vol. 1. Houston: Sanders Historical Publications.
- Sanders, Joanne McRee, ed. (1984). Barbados Records: Baptisms, 1637–1800. Baltimore: Genealogical Publications.
- Seitz, Don Carlos; Gospel, Howard F.; Wood, Stephen (2002). Under the Black Flag: Exploits of the Most Notorious Pirates (2 ed.). Mineola, New York: Courier Dover Publications. ISBN 0-486-42131-7.
- Woodard, Colin (2007). The Republic of Pirates: Being the True and Surprising Story of the Caribbean Pirates and the Man who Brought Them Down. New York: Harcourt. ISBN 978-0-15-603462-3.
- Cowse, Benjamin, ed. (1719). The Tryals of Major Stede Bonnet, and Other Pirates (PDF). London: Rose and Crown in St Paul's Church-Yard.
