= William Rhett =

English-born planter, politician and military officer

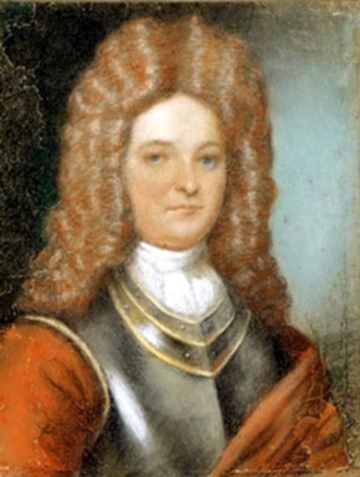
- Portrait of Rhett
- Born: September 4, 1666; London, England
- Died: January 12, 1723 (aged 56); Charleston, South Carolina
- Occupations: Planter, politician, military officer

Colonel William Rhett (4 September 1666 – 12 January 1723) was an English-born planter, politician and military officer who moved to the Carolinas, where he spent the majority of his life. Born in London, Rhett emigrated to North America in 1694, accompanied by his wife Sarah. He gradually acquired ownership over several slave plantations which specialized in producing rice. Rhett also sat in the South Carolina General Assembly and served in the colonial militia; in 1718, he commanded two chartered sloops and defeated the Barbadian pirate Stede Bonnet in the Battle of Cape Fear River.

== Career ==
Coat of Arms of William Rhett

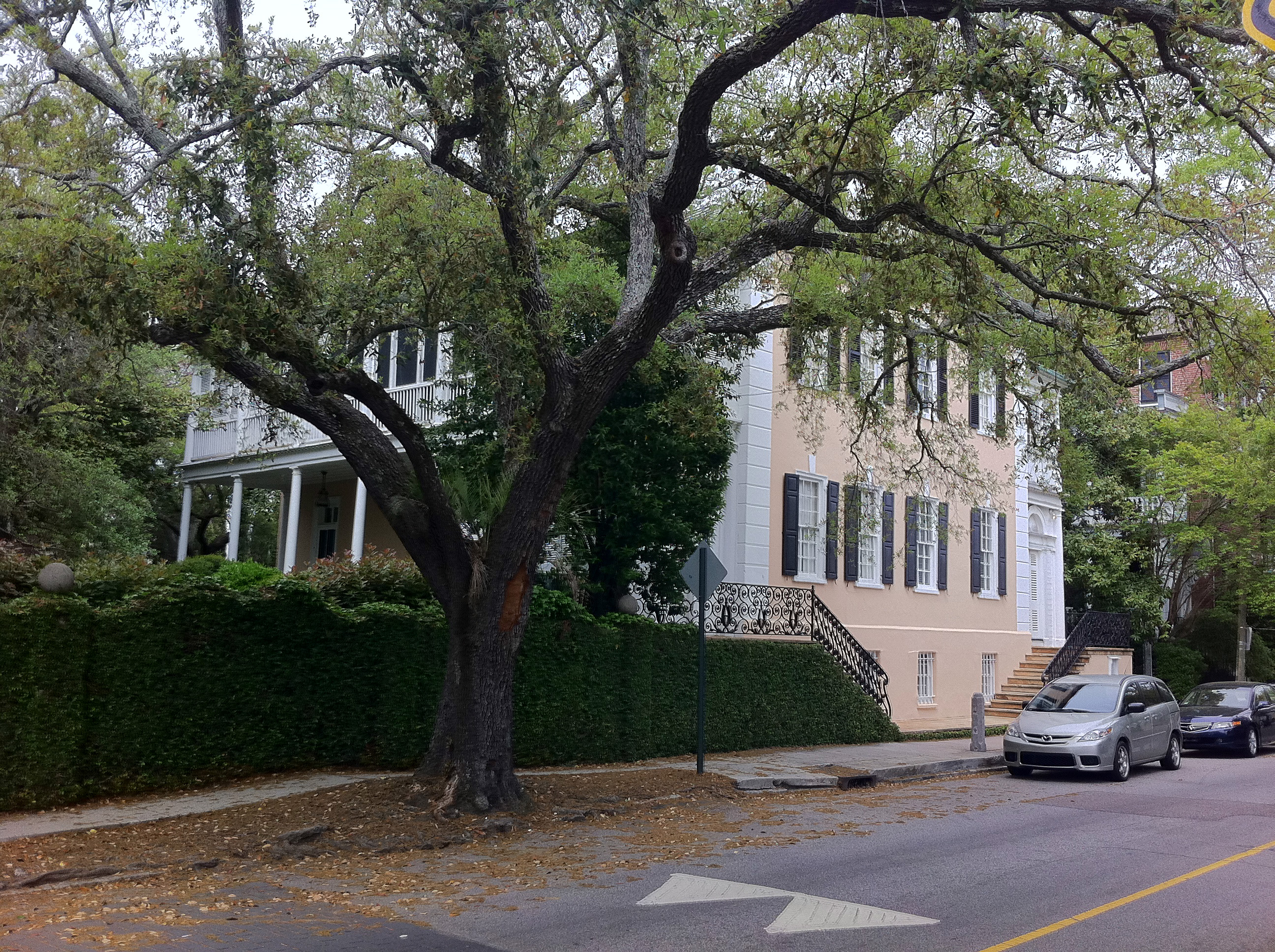
The Col. William Rhett House, 54 Hasell St., Charleston, South Carolina

Rhett was a colonel in the colonial militia, receiver-general of the Lords Proprietors of Carolina, surveyor, and comptroller of customs for Carolina and the Bahama Islands. He was also an active merchant captain, sailing the vessel Providence between the Carolinas and the Bahamas. In April 1699 the Providence was attacked by Dutch pirate Hendrick van Hoven (alias Captain Hyne or Hind):

about the latter end of April last, one Capt. Hind, a notorious pirate and sea-rover, having lately got into a brigantine with a mixt company of Dutch, French and other people, came up with an English-built ship mounted with two and twenty guns called the Providence galley, under the command of Capt. William Rhett of Carolina, who made a very generous defence, but was outdone and taken by the said Pirate.

In 1706, Rhett commanded an improvised naval flotilla which fought off a Franco-Spanish attack on Charles Town. In 1718 he provided two sloops to be fitted out as pirate hunters - Henry and Sea Nymph, each with eight guns and a crew of between 60 and 70 men. Rhett assumed the position of captain of this small flotilla and led it to victory in the 1718 Battle of Cape Fear River, capturing Stede Bonnet, the so-called "gentleman pirate." Bonnet escaped from jail with the help of local merchant and fellow pirate Richard Tookerman; he made it as far as Sullivan's Island before Rhett again captured him.

Rhett's house in Charleston, completed in 1716, still stands in its original location at 54 Hasell St., Charleston, South Carolina. It has been restored and is now privately owned. A Confederate politician born Robert Barnwell Smith changed his name to Robert Rhett, an ancestor.

== Popular culture ==
- William Rhett is a minor character in Tim Powers' novel On Stranger Tides.
- Lars Arentz-Hansen plays William Rhett in the Starz TV series Black Sails.

== See also ==
- Rhett House Inn
