= Outer Banks =

Barrier islands in North Carolina and Virginia, United States

Coordinates: 35°14′00″N 75°31′49″W

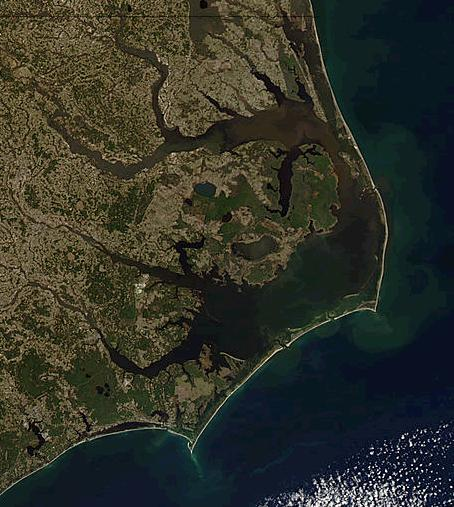
The Outer Banks, separating the Atlantic Ocean (east) from Currituck Albemarle Sounds (north) and Pamlico Sound (south)

The Outer Banks (frequently abbreviated OBX) are a 200 mi (320 km) string of barrier islands and spits off the coast of North Carolina and southeastern Virginia, on the east coast of the United States. They line most of the North Carolina coastline, separating Currituck Sound, Albemarle Sound, and Pamlico Sound from the Atlantic Ocean.

A major tourist destination, the Outer Banks are known for their wide expanse of open beachfront and Cape Hatteras National Seashore. The seashore and surrounding ecosystem are important biodiversity zones, including beach grasses and shrubland that help maintain the form of the land.

The hundreds of shipwrecks along the Outer Banks have given the surrounding seas the nickname Graveyard of the Atlantic. The Outer Banks were also home to the Wright brothers' first flight in a controlled, powered, heavier-than-air vehicle on December 17, 1903, at Kill Devil Hills. During the 20th century, the region became increasingly important for coastal tourism.

Outer Banks National Scenic Byway

The Outer Banks are particularly vulnerable to sea level rise and coastal erosion; the effects of climate change compound existing coastal erosion caused by poor coastal management and construction practices. In some locations on the banks, sea levels rose 5 inches from 2011 to 2015. Some sections have significantly eroded already, with portions of Hatteras Island at 25% of its original width as of 2014. Tropical storms like Hurricane Irene in 2011 have destroyed significant infrastructure and property.

== Terminology ==
The term "Outer Banks" refers to the islands, shoals, and spits from Ocracoke northward, also includes Core Banks, and is frequently abbreviated OBX on regional tourism marketing. In recent decades, the beaches to the south of Cape Lookout have been marketing themselves as the "Southern Outer Banks", including the marketing as SOBX; this region includes the Crystal Coast beaches of Bogue Banks. The term Inner Banks and IBX is a similarly new term to refer to the mainland communities along Albemarle and Pamlico Sounds.

== Geography ==
Beach on the Outer Banks, North Carolina

A tall ridge of sand dunes that survived the melting of the Earth's glaciers gave rise to the barrier islands that make up the Outer Banks. By protecting the coastal mainland from the raging waves and storms of the ocean, barrier islands get their name. The Outer Banks is a string of peninsulas and barrier islands separating the Atlantic Ocean from mainland North Carolina. From north to south, the largest of these include: Bodie Island (which used to be an island but is now a peninsula due to tropical storms and hurricanes that closed inlets that separated it from the Currituck Banks), Pea Island (which has, at times, been contiguous with neighboring Bodie Island or Hatteras Island), Hatteras Island, Ocracoke Island, Portsmouth Island, and the Core Banks. Over time, the exact number of islands and inlets changes as new inlets are opened up, often during a breach created during violent storms, and older inlets close, usually due to gradually shifting sands during the processes of beach evolution.

The Outer Banks stretch southward from Sandbridge in Virginia Beach down the North Carolina coastline. Sources differ regarding the southern terminus of the Outer Banks. The most extensive definition includes the state's three prominent capes: Cape Hatteras, Cape Lookout, and Cape Fear. Other sources limit the definition to two capes (Cape Hatteras and Cape Lookout) and coastal areas in four counties (Currituck County, Dare County, Hyde County, and Carteret County). Some authors exclude Carteret's Bogue Banks; others exclude the county entirely.

The northern part of the Outer Banks, from Oregon Inlet northward, is actually a part of the North American mainland, since the northern inlets of Bodie Island and Currituck Banks no longer exist. It is separated by the Currituck Sound and the Intracoastal Waterway, which passes through the Great Dismal Swamp occupying much of the mainland west of the Outer Banks. Road access to the northern Outer Banks is cut off between Sandbridge and Corolla, North Carolina, with communities such as Carova Beach accessible only by four-wheel drive vehicles. North Carolina State Highway 12 links most of the popular Outer Banks communities in this section of the coast. The easternmost point is Rodanthe Pier in Rodanthe, North Carolina.

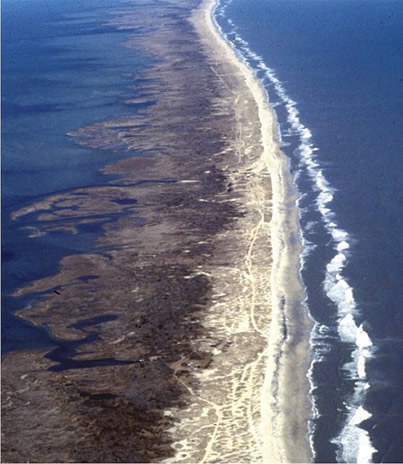
Aerial view of Outer banks (looking north), with sound on the left and ocean on the right

The Outer Banks are not anchored to offshore coral reefs like some other barrier islands, and as a consequence, they often suffer significant beach erosion during major storms. In fact, their location jutting out into the Atlantic makes them the most hurricane-prone area north of Florida, for both landfalling storms and brushing storms offshore. Hatteras Island was cut in half on September 18, 2003, when Hurricane Isabel washed a 2,000 feet (600 m) wide and 15 feet (5 m) deep channel called Isabel Inlet through the community of Hatteras Village on the southern end of the island. The tear was subsequently repaired and restored by sand dredging by the U.S. Army Corps of Engineers. It was cut off once again in 2011 by Hurricane Irene. Access to the island was largely limited to boat access only from August to late October until another temporary bridge could be built.

Three state highway bridges connect the Outer Banks to the mainland. The Wright Memorial Bridge, the oldest (built in 1930, rehabilitated in 1966), carries US 158 between Point Harbor and Kitty Hawk. William B. Umstead Bridge, the second oldest (built in 1957, rehabilitated in 1966), carries US 64 between Manns Harbor on the mainland and Manteo on Roanoke Island. The newest bridge, the Virginia Dare Memorial Bridge, was completed in 2002 and carries US 64 Bypass between Manns Harbor and Roanoke Island between Manteo and Wanchese. The Washington Baum Bridge and Melvin R. Daniels Bridge carry US 64 between Roanoke Island and Nags Head. At Whalebone Junction, the three main highways of the Outer Banks (NC 12, US 158, and US 64) all meet. Additionally, NC 615 serves as the main route along Knotts Island in the extreme north; it connects only to Virginia by land.

A number of ferries maintained by the North Carolina Department of Transportation Ferry Division also serve the Outer Banks. From north to south, these are the Knotts Island-Currituck Ferry, the Hatteras-Ocracoke Ferry, the Swan Quarter-Ocracoke Ferry, and the Cedar Island-Ocracoke Ferry. Additionally, a semi-regular emergency ferry often runs from Stumpy Point to Rodanthe to serve travelers due to frequent wash-outs of NC 12 between Nags Head and Rodanthe. Additionally, private ferries are commissioned by the National Park Service to access certain islands within the National Seashores along the outer banks, these include ferries to Portsmouth Island, to Cape Lookout Lighthouse, and various locations along Core Banks and Shackleford Banks.

Unlike other parts of North Carolina, which have very stable geography, the geography of the Outer Banks is constantly shifting. It is estimated that the outer banks drift several feet each year. The result of these changes is not certain, with theories ranging from the island shrinking in width, moving further inland, or sinking into the ocean. There are currently efforts to alleviate the damage to areas of the Outer Banks, including the FORA (Shoreline Stabilization for Erosion Control), which plans to protect the shoreline of the Fort Raleigh National Historic Site.

The North Carolina Department of Transportation intends to construct a new bridge connecting Currituck County to the Outer Banks. This bridge would span 7 miles long, and construction is planned to begin in 2026. The main intention of the bridge is to alleviate traffic congestion in the event that an evacuation of the Outer Banks is required, in the event of a storm. This is especially concerning because the estimated time it would take to evacuate the area using the current bridge exceeds the state-designated time. The other impact would be decreased congestion during the summer months, when traffic is the heaviest.

The cost of maintenance of the Outer Banks has been a large concern for the area. Due to constant storms and strong currents, bridges need to be constantly rebuilt or refurbished. In the years 2012–2022, the Department of Transportation spent $9,592,745.55 on bridge maintenance, and during the same period, disaster repairs cost $33,546,190.58.

== Ecology ==
=== Vegetation ===
American Beachgrass in the Outer Banks

The vegetation of the Outer Banks has biodiversity, although it is considered the northern limit for many southern plants such as wild scrub palms. In the northern part of the Outer Banks, from Virginia Beach southward past the North Carolina border to Cape Hatteras, the main types of vegetation are sea grasses, beach grasses and other beach plants. This includes Opuntia humifusa on the Atlantic side, wax myrtles, bays, and grasses on the Sound side, with areas of pine and Spanish moss-covered live oaks. Yucca aloifolia and Yucca gloriosa can be found growing wild here in the northern parts of its range on the beach. Dwarf palmettos were once indigenous to the entire Outer Banks, and they are still successfully planted and grown. Its current most northerly known native stand is on Monkey Island in Currituck County.

From Cape Hatteras National Seashore southward, the vegetation does include dwarf palmetto (Sabal minor), Yucca aloifolia and Yucca gloriosa; however, the area also has cabbage palmetto (Sabal palmetto), which can be found in the north, although they are native in the southern part of the Outer Banks, specifically prevalent from Cape Hatteras and all points southward. Pindo palms and windmill palms are also planted widely throughout the Outer Banks; although, they are not native to the area.

A wide variety of native plants can be found at the Elizabethan Gardens in Manteo on Roanoke Island.

The Outer Banks are home to Yaupon Holly (Ilex vomitoria), the roasted leaves of which were brewed into a high caffeine beverage called black drink by the Native Americans. The Outer Banks may be one of the few places where it is still consumed.

=== Animal life ===
Spanish Mustangs in Corolla, North Carolina

The islands are home to herds of wild and feral horses, known as Banker horses, which according to local legend are descended from Spanish mustangs washed ashore centuries ago in shipwrecks. Populations are found on Ocracoke Island, Shackleford Banks, Currituck Banks, and in the Rachel Carson Estuarine Sanctuary. Wild horses are also found in Corolla, North Carolina, where many tourists come to see them roam freely. These wild horses have been negatively affected by humans. Consequently, rules have been implemented to keep these horses safe. Humans cannot be within fifty feet of these horses. Many tourists have been unaware of the harmful effects of feeding wild horses. Consequently, some of these horses have died from eating foods given by tourists lacking in awareness.

Two Brown Pelicans in the Outer Banks

The Outer Banks is located on the Atlantic Flyway for migratory birds. These barrier islands are home to a variety of birds, and also act as a temporary resting area for migratory birds. The Osprey, Brown pelican, and Piping plover are among the birds found in the Outer Banks. The osprey and brown pelican can dive underwater to catch their prey and fully submerge themselves beneath the surface. Ospreys live near bodies of water such as oceans, lakes, and reservoirs. Brown pelicans primarily live near ocean beaches. Both the osprey's and pelican's diets is predominantly fish. The piping plover, now an endangered species, uses the Outer Banks as a migratory rest-stop along the Atlantic flyway. Piping plovers rely on sandy beaches for habitats, which the Outer Bank's land region provides.

The Outer Banks has an abundant marine ecosystem. The estuaries and sounds within the barrier islands provide shelter for fish and shellfish, such as the Pamlico Sound. Other marine life in the Outer Banks includes jellyfish, seals, dolphins, and sea turtles. The leatherback sea-turtle is another endangered species that can be found in the surrounding waters of the Outer Banks. It is the largest species of sea-turtle that travels long distances across the ocean.

== Climate ==
The Outer Banks have a humid subtropical climate (Cfa). They have unusual weather patterns because of their unique geographical location. As the islands jut out from the eastern seaboard into the Atlantic Gulf Stream, the Outer Banks have a predisposition to be affected by hurricanes, Nor'easters (usually in the form of rain, and rarely snow or mixed precipitation), and other ocean-driven storms. The hardiness zone has traditionally been 8b, but many parts of the northern Outer Banks were moved into zone 9a in the 2023 USDA revision.

The winters are typically milder than in inland areas, averaging lows in the upper 30s and highs in the lower 50s, and are more frequently overcast than in the summer. However, the exposure of the Outer Banks makes them prone to higher winds, often causing wind chills to make the apparent temperature as cold as the inland areas. The summer months average lows from the mid-70s to highs in the upper 80s, depending on the time of the summer. The spring and fall are typically milder seasons. The fall and winter are usually warmer than areas inland, and the spring and summer are often slightly cooler because of the moderating effects of being surrounded by water.

Although snow is possible, averaging from 3 inches in the north to less than 1/2 inch per year in the south, there are many times when years pass between snowfalls. The majority of nor'easters are "born" off the coasts of the Outer Banks.

The Outer Banks are particularly vulnerable to sea level rise and coastal erosion; the effects of climate change compounds existing coastal erosion caused by poor coastal management and construction practices. In some locations on the banks, sea levels rose 5 inches from 2011 to 2015. Some sections have significantly eroded already, with portions of Hatteras Island at 25% of its original width as of 2014. Tropical storms like Hurricane Irene in 2011 have already destroyed significant infrastructure and property.

Climate change has had a severe impact on the Outer Banks. Due to a process called subsidence, in which parts of the islands sink into the ocean, rising sea levels have an even greater impact on the Outer Banks than on other parts of the Earth. While Dunes can help alleviate erosion and damage to the island, the construction of bridges damages them, making the erosion worse. Another concern with rising sea levels is high tide flooding. While the normal sea level may not sink the islands, during high tide, it can flood them. In reaction to this, the town of Nags Head decided to prioritize projects that manage the erosion caused. Vertical sheet pile sills are also utilized to prevent erosion.

Another method of preventing erosion is nourishment dredging. This is a process in which sand is removed from another off-site area and brought to the beach experiencing erosion. The counties of Duck and Dare recently tried this in 2023. The project spanned 1.7 miles, with 550,000 cubic yards of sand being used. This was similar to another nourishment dredging project that occurred in the same area in 2017.

== History ==
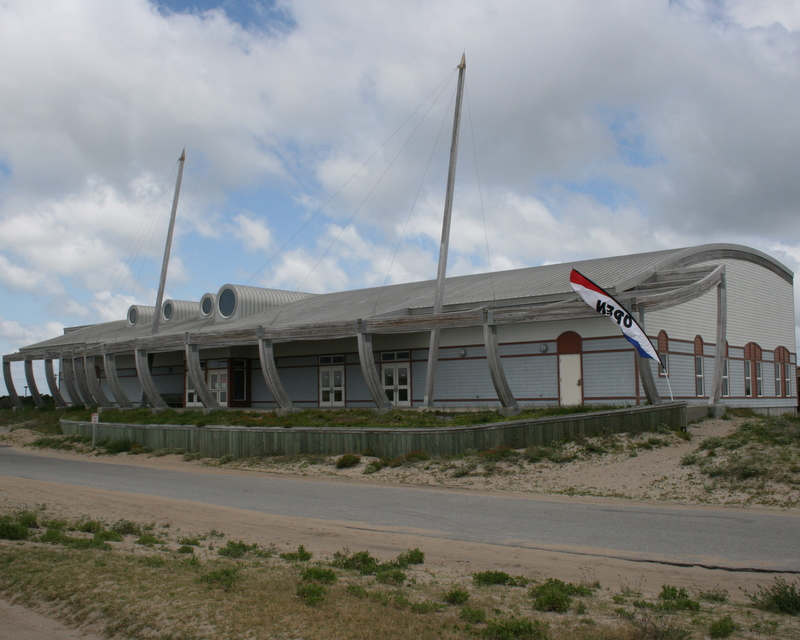
Graveyard of the Atlantic Museum, Hatteras, North Carolina, June 2007

The Outer Banks is one of the most culturally distinctive areas of the East Coast of the United States. The Outer Banks were inhabited before the arrival of Europeans, with small branches of larger tribes, such as the Algonquin speaking Chowanoke, Secotan and Poteskeet living semi-nomadic lives. Oftentimes, Native Americans would use the barrier islands facing the Atlantic Ocean for fishing in the summer, and reside on Roanoke Island or the North Carolina mainland in the winter.

European explorers to the Outer Banks in the 16th century noted encountering friendly Native Americans from Hatteras Island and Outer Banks, noting their hospitality to foreign explorers as well as their happiness and overall quality of life. European-borne diseases and migration to the mainland were likely the main causes for the decline of the Native population. The most notable event was the attempted colonization of Roanoke by the English, beginning in 1584. Much later, in December 1903, on the dunes of Kitty Hawk, North Carolina, two brothers, Orville and Wilbur Wright, from Dayton, Ohio, flew their Wright Flyer for 12 seconds, performing the first heavier-than-air flight in recorded history, cementing the state of North Carolina with the moniker "First in Flight".

Before bridges were built in the 1930s, the only form of transport between or off the islands was by boat, which allowed the islands to stay isolated from much of the rest of the mainland. This helped to preserve the maritime culture and the distinctive Outer Banks accent or brogue, which sounds more like an English accent than it does an American accent. Many "bankers" have often been mistaken for being from England or Ireland when traveling to areas outside of the Outer Banks. The brogue is more distinctive the further south one travels on the Outer Banks, and is thickest on Ocracoke Island and Harkers Island.

Some residents of the Outer Banks, known as wreckers, made part of their living by scavenging wrecked ships—or by luring ships to their destruction. Horses with lanterns tied to their necks would be walked along the beach; the lanterns' up and down motion would appear to ships to represent clear water and a ship ahead; the unsuspecting captain would then drive his ship ashore following this false light. Ocracoke was the last refuge of pirate Edward Teach, better known as Blackbeard. It is also where the infamous pirate was killed on November 22, 1718, in a fierce battle with troops from Virginia.

During the Civil War, the Union wanted to blockade Confederate ports to prevent the South from getting revenue from trade. On April 27, 1861, the blockage was modified to include Virginia and North Carolina. On August 27, 1861, Commodore Silas Stringham and General Benjamin Butler, seeking to enforce the Union blockade, decided to attack two forts at Cape Hatteras. At the time, the Confederacy was more concerned with battles in Virginia, leaving the Outer Banks severely undersupplied and vulnerable. It only took an amphibious assault 2 days to take the forts.

During World War II, the Outer Banks also saw a lot of conflict. German U-boats were stationed on the American shoreline with the intent to sink any American ships that were carrying supplies to support Allied soldiers in Europe. So much naval activity occurred near the Outer Banks that it was briefly nicknamed "Torpedo Junction". This affected the citizens of the island, who had to deal with constant mandated blackouts to prevent submarines from locating targets. In school, buses were often searched by soldiers at certain checkpoints. Bodies, along with supplies, would wash up on shore from ships and submarines that had been sunk. The latter was very helpful to locals who found them, as a lot of the goods could either be sold or were still in good enough condition to be consumed. Much of the military equipment found washed up on shore was donated to local museums.

The first German U-boat (U-85) to ever be sunk by the U.S. Navy was sunk off the coast of North Carolina, near Cape Hatteras.

== Economy ==
Major industries of the region include commercial fishing, boat building and tourism. Since the 1990s, the rise of tourism has led the region to become an increasingly service-oriented economy.

Dare County, which resides in the Outer Banks, surpassed $2.15 billion in revenue in 2023. The taxes from this profit allow the residents of the Outer Banks to enjoy the highest level of tax relief in the state. The high amount of tourism in the area is responsible for nearly half of the jobs in Dare County. This has allowed Dare County to be placed at 4th in visitor spending in all of North Carolina. In the 2022-2023 fiscal year, tax revenue was able to supply $16,325,384 to beach nourishment in the area.

=== Maritime industries ===
There has been a long history of fishing in the Outer Banks, dating back to the end of the 17th century. Pirates ravaged the coast for the majority of the 1600s, but once they were ridden, the local settlers used fishing as their lifeline.

In the mid-19th century, large-scale commercial fishing erupted, mostly due to the construction of the Albemarle and Chesapeake Canal, which simplified shipping methods for fishermen. Saltwater fishing became the cash-crop of the Outer Banks, and blossomed it into a popular tourist destination. In modern times, tourists will flock to the area just for the abundance of fishing opportunities. Anglers, otherwise known as fishermen, have a wide range of fishing methods, some dating back to when the first settlers arrived, to choose from in the Outer Banks.

== Lighthouses ==
There are currently six lighthouses on the Outer Banks:

Lighthouse	Location (all in North Carolina)
Currituck Beach Lighthouse	Corolla
Roanoke Marshes Light	Manteo
Bodie Island Lighthouse	South of Nags Head
Cape Hatteras Lighthouse	Buxton
Ocracoke Light	Ocracoke
Cape Lookout Lighthouse	Carteret County

== Communities ==
Towns and communities along the Outer Banks include (listed from north to south):

=== Currituck Banks ===
- Sandbridge (VA)
- Carova Beach
- Corolla
- Knotts Island

=== Bodie Island ===
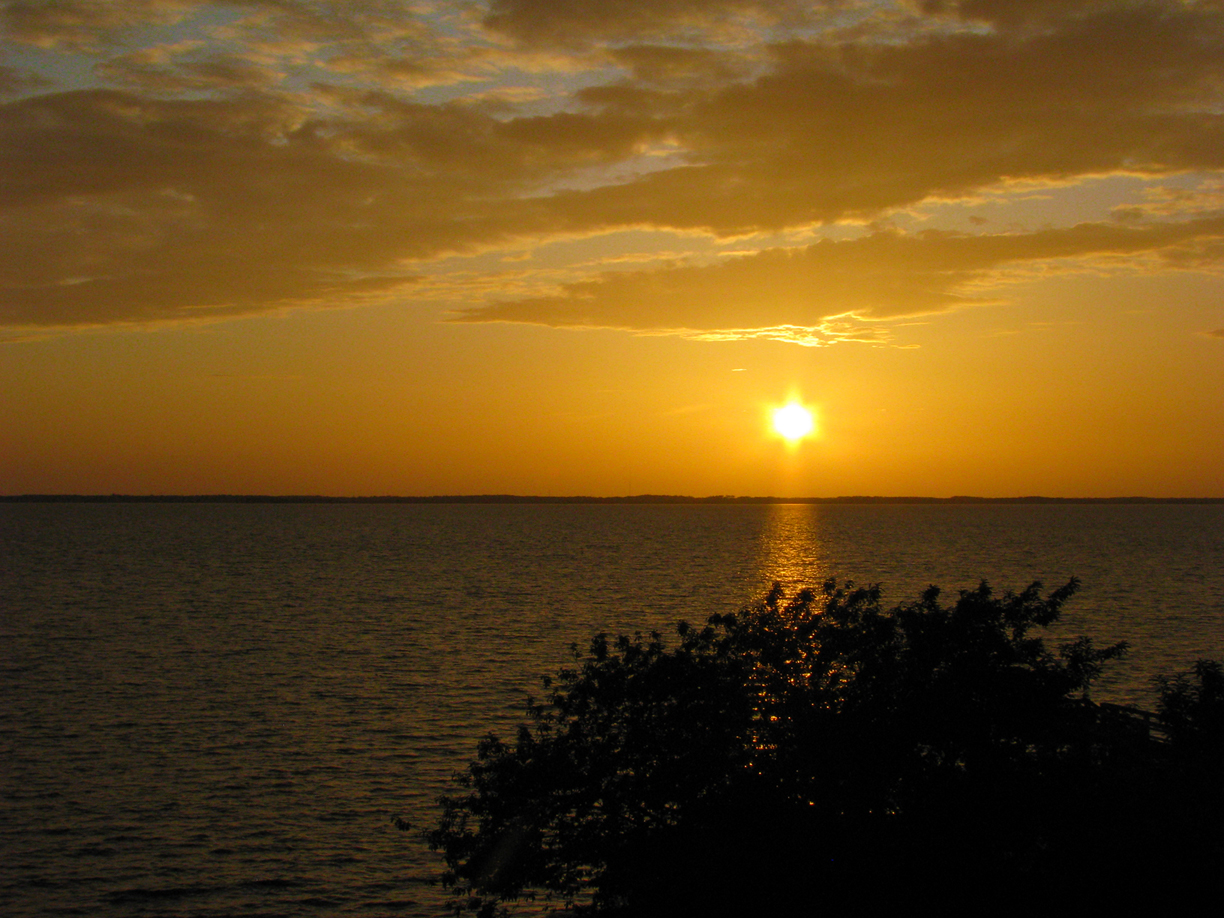
Sunset over the Currituck Sound in Duck (2009)

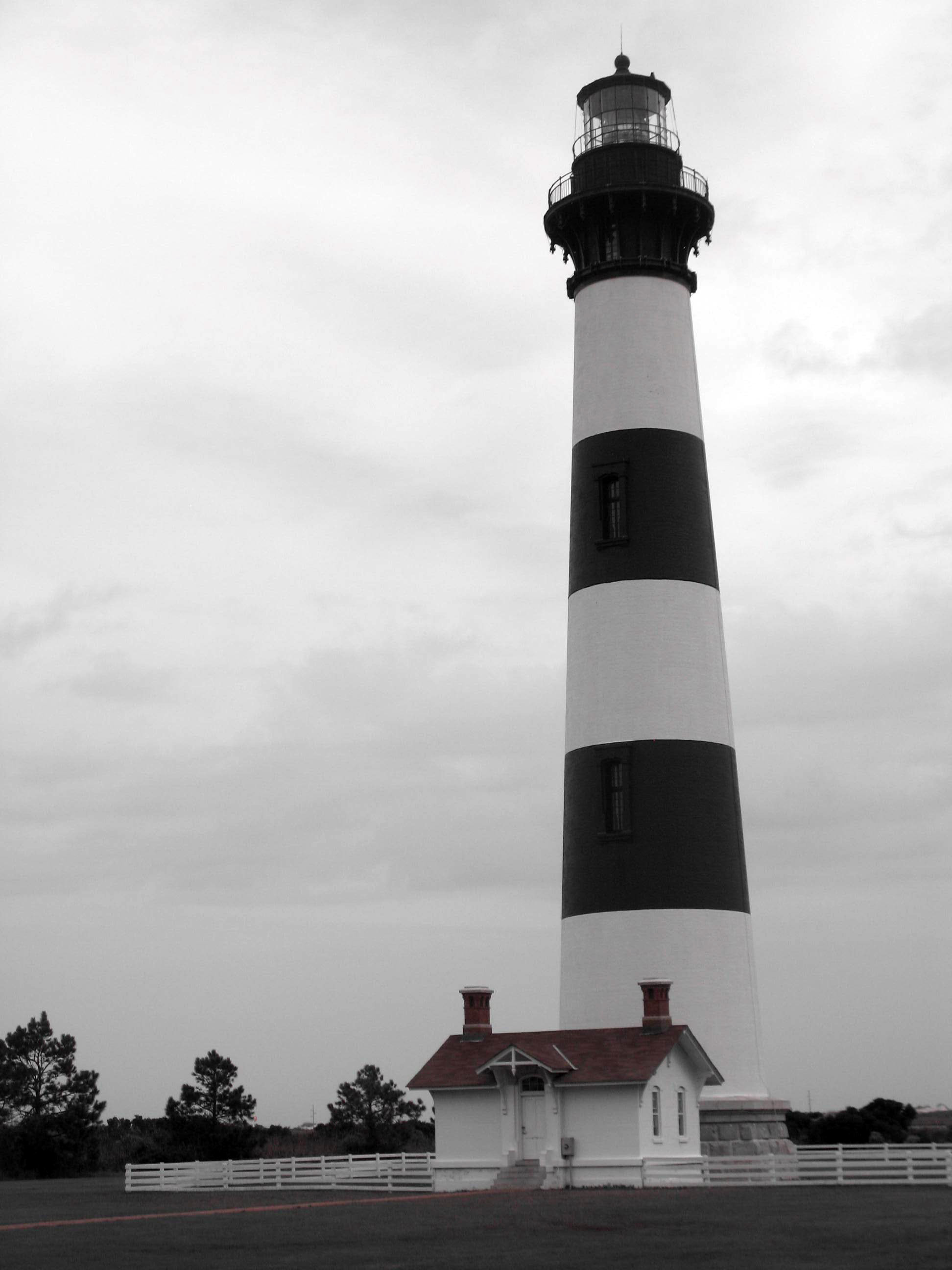
The Bodie Island Lighthouse (October 2008)

- Duck
- Southern Shores
- Kitty Hawk
- Kill Devil Hills
- Colington Island
- Nags Head

=== Roanoke Island ===
- Manteo
- Wanchese

=== Hatteras Island ===
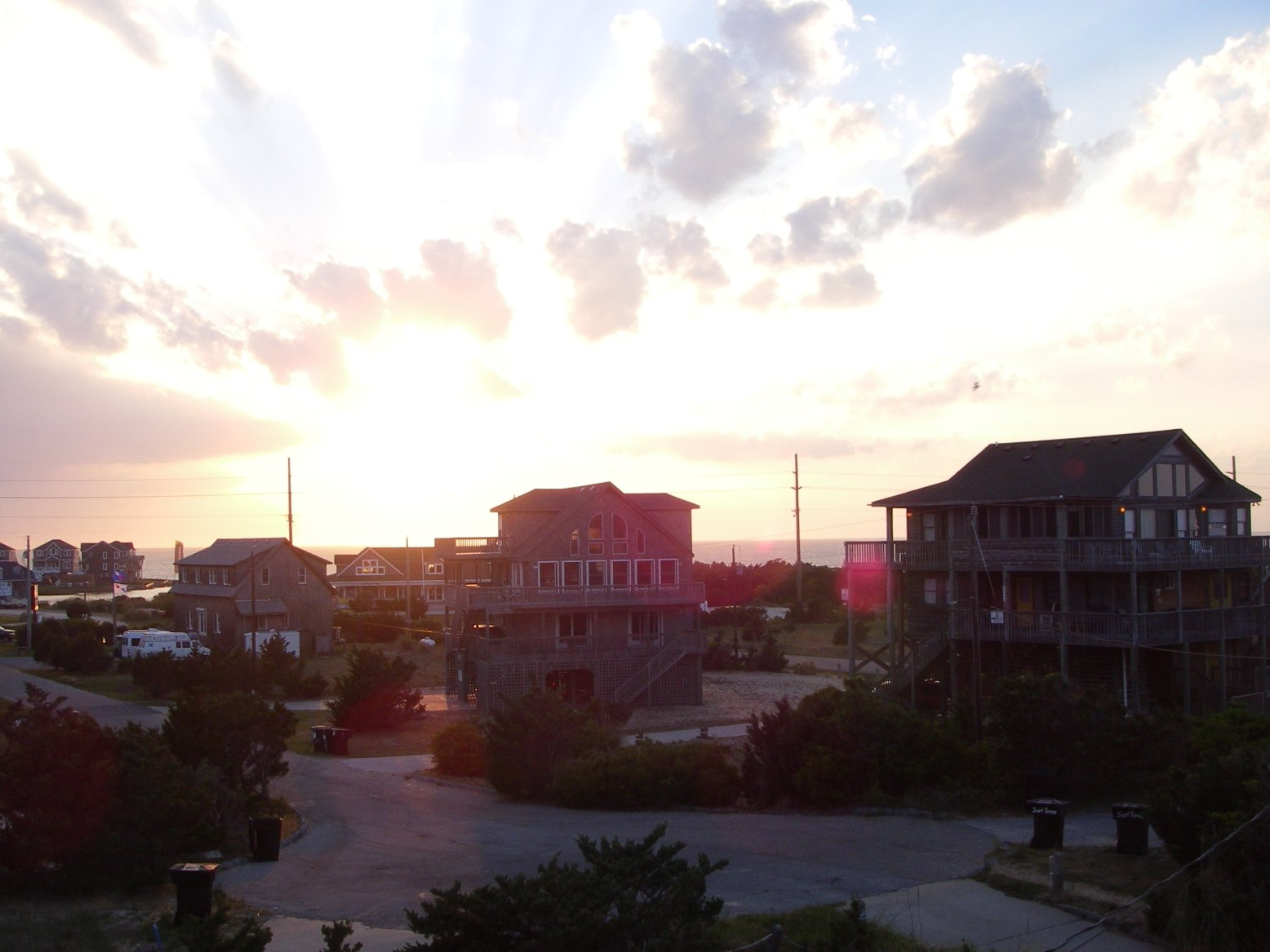
Sunset over Avon

- Rodanthe
- Waves
- Salvo
- Avon
- Buxton
- Frisco
- Hatteras

=== Ocracoke Island ===
- Ocracoke

=== Core Banks ===
- Portsmouth Island

=== Bogue Banks ===
- Atlantic Beach
- Pine Knoll Shores
- Indian Beach
- Salter Path
- Emerald Isle

=== Southern Outer Banks ===
- Morehead City
- Swansboro

== Parks ==
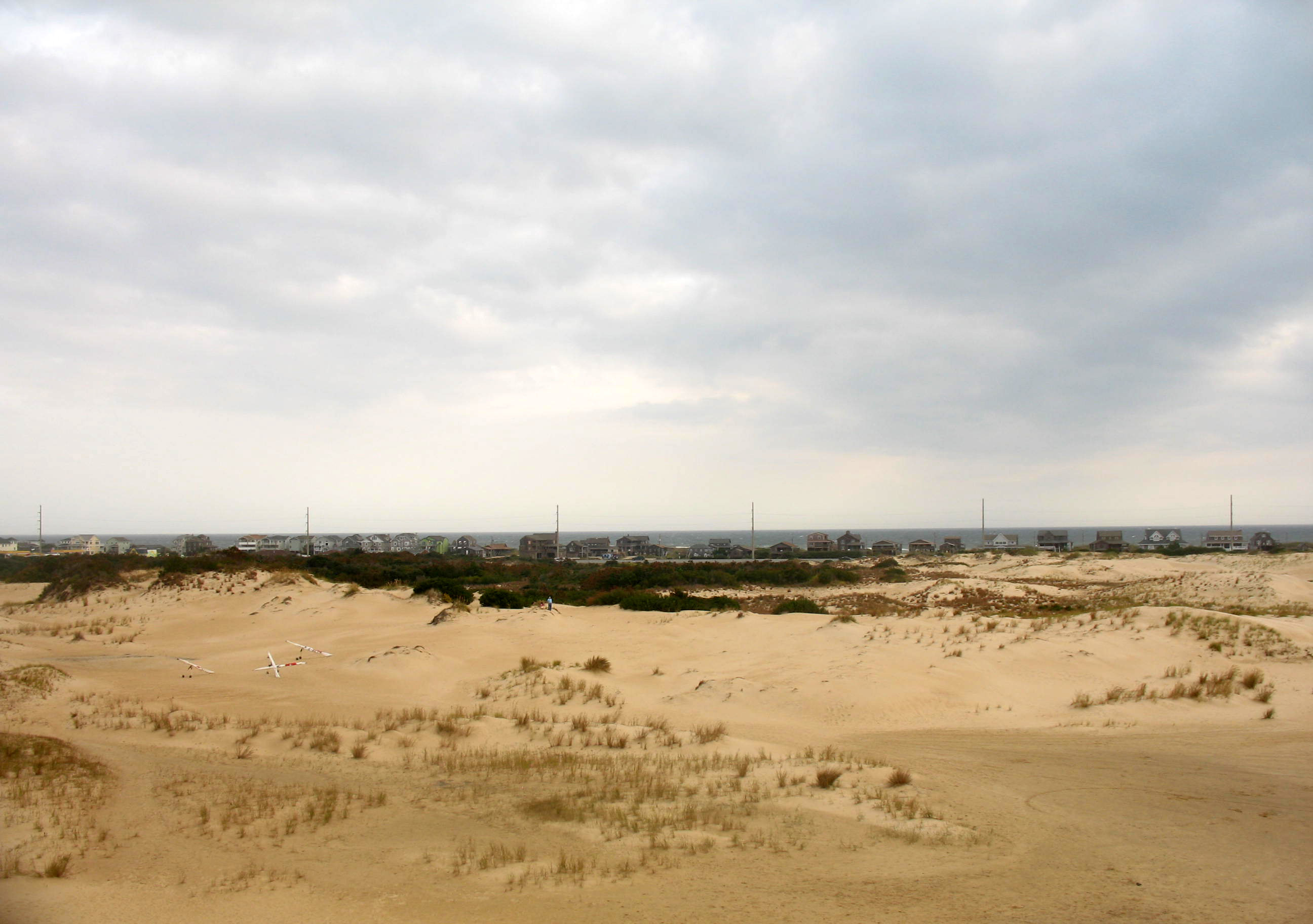
Jockey's Ridge State Park

- Back Bay National Wildlife Refuge
- Cape Hatteras National Seashore
- Cape Lookout National Seashore
- Currituck Heritage Park
- Currituck National Wildlife Refuge
- False Cape State Park
- Fort Macon State Park
- Fort Raleigh National Historic Site
- Jockey's Ridge State Park
- Mackay Island National Wildlife Refuge
- Pea Island National Wildlife Refuge
- Wright Brothers National Memorial

== Notable residents ==
- George Ackles (born 1967), professional basketball player
- Dennis Anderson (born 1960), professional Monster Truck driver and creator of Grave Digger
- Marc Basnight (1947–2020), former member of the North Carolina State Senate
- Emanuel Davis (born 1989), Canadian Football League defensive back
- Andy Griffith (1926–2012), actor
- Cathy Johnston-Forbes (born 1963), professional golfer
- Alexis Knapp (born 1989), actress
- William Ivey Long (born 1947), costume designer for stage and film
- Edward Teach (1680–1718), notorious English pirate better known as "Blackbeard", raided on the North Atlantic and Caribbean Sea
- Manteo (disappeared after 1587) influential figure in the Croatoan Nation, ambassador to England and mediator
- Wanchese (disappeared after 1587) influential figure in the Roanoke Nation, opposed English colonization

== See also ==
- Crystal Coast (Southern Outer Banks)
- Hazard mitigation in the Outer Banks
- Historic Albemarle Tour
- Inner Banks
- North Carolina Highway 12
- Outer Banks Daredevils
- Outer Banks (TV series)
