= Crystal Coast =

Coastal region of North Carolina, United States

Coordinates: 34.695285°N 76.709010°W

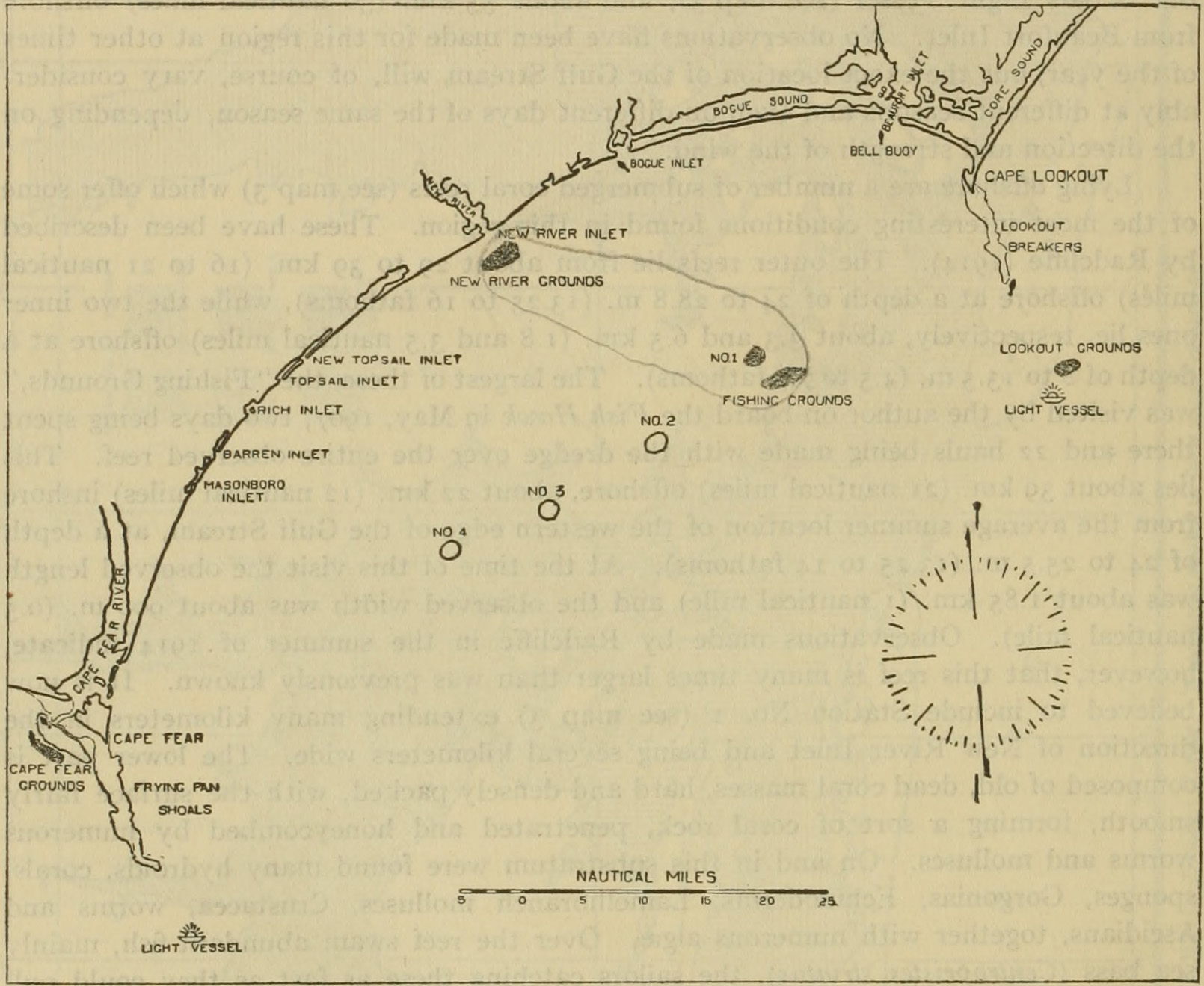
Map of Crystal Coast. The Crystal Coast extends southwestward from Cape Lookout to the New River Inlet.

In North Carolina, the Crystal Coast is an 85-mile stretch of coastline that extends from the Cape Lookout National Seashore, which includes 56 miles of protected beaches, southwestward to the New River. The Crystal Coast is a popular area with tourists and second-home owners in the summer, with a name coined by the Carteret County Tourism Development Authority.

The absolute boundaries of this coast are often disputed, but the main area includes all Carteret County beaches, including Bogue Banks, Harkers Island, and Down East. The beaches of southeastern Onslow County are also included, such as Bear Island and Hammocks Beach, and a few ports along the Intracoastal Waterway. Some tourism marketing describes the region as the Southern Outer Banks, to draw a connection to the main barrier islands of the Outer Banks.

The main communities include the coastal resorts of Atlantic Beach, Emerald Isle, Indian Beach, Pine Knoll Shores and Salter Path, as well as the inland (sound side) ports of Beaufort, Morehead City, and Swansboro. Besides the many quiet beach communities and numerous shops and restaurants in the area, other major attractions include Fort Macon State Park, which protects a series of historic coastal forts used from the early 19th to the mid 20th century, and the North Carolina Aquarium at Pine Knoll Shores, one of three such aquariums located along the North Carolina coast. A population of feral Banker horses is located on Shackleford Banks, and several protected areas, including Hammocks Beach State Park, Cape Lookout National Seashore (including the ghost town of Portsmouth) lie along the region as well.

== Tourism ==
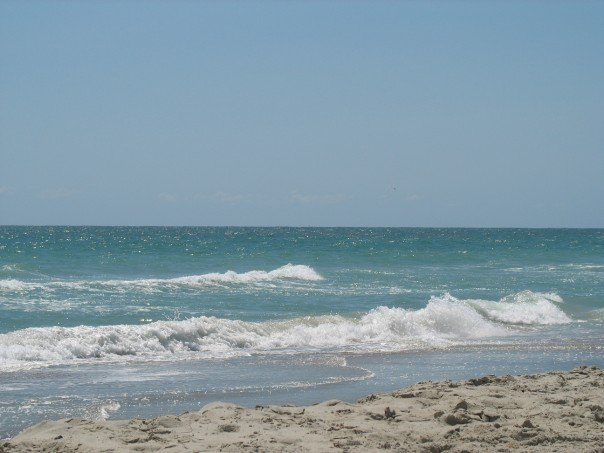
The crystal-water beaches that give the area its name

=== Beaches ===
The Carteret County Tourism Development Authority coined the name of Crystal Coast, to highlight the appeal of its waters. This body is also known as the Crystal Coast Tourism Authority.

The area has more than 100 restaurants and many hotels, including the Doubletree Atlantic Beach, the largest full-service hotel on the coast of North Carolina. Beach cottages, which are often rented out for a week during the summer, are also popular here, especially in Emerald Isle. Numerous properties are held as second homes by people with full-time residences in the interior of the state, such as in the cities of Kinston, Goldsboro and the capital Raleigh.

Many areas in this region have public access to the beaches, with one of the most popular being an area known as "The Circle" in central Atlantic Beach. It is a collection of shops, restaurants, and beachfront houses along the ocean at the end of the causeway from the bridge to Morehead City.

=== Diving and fishing ===
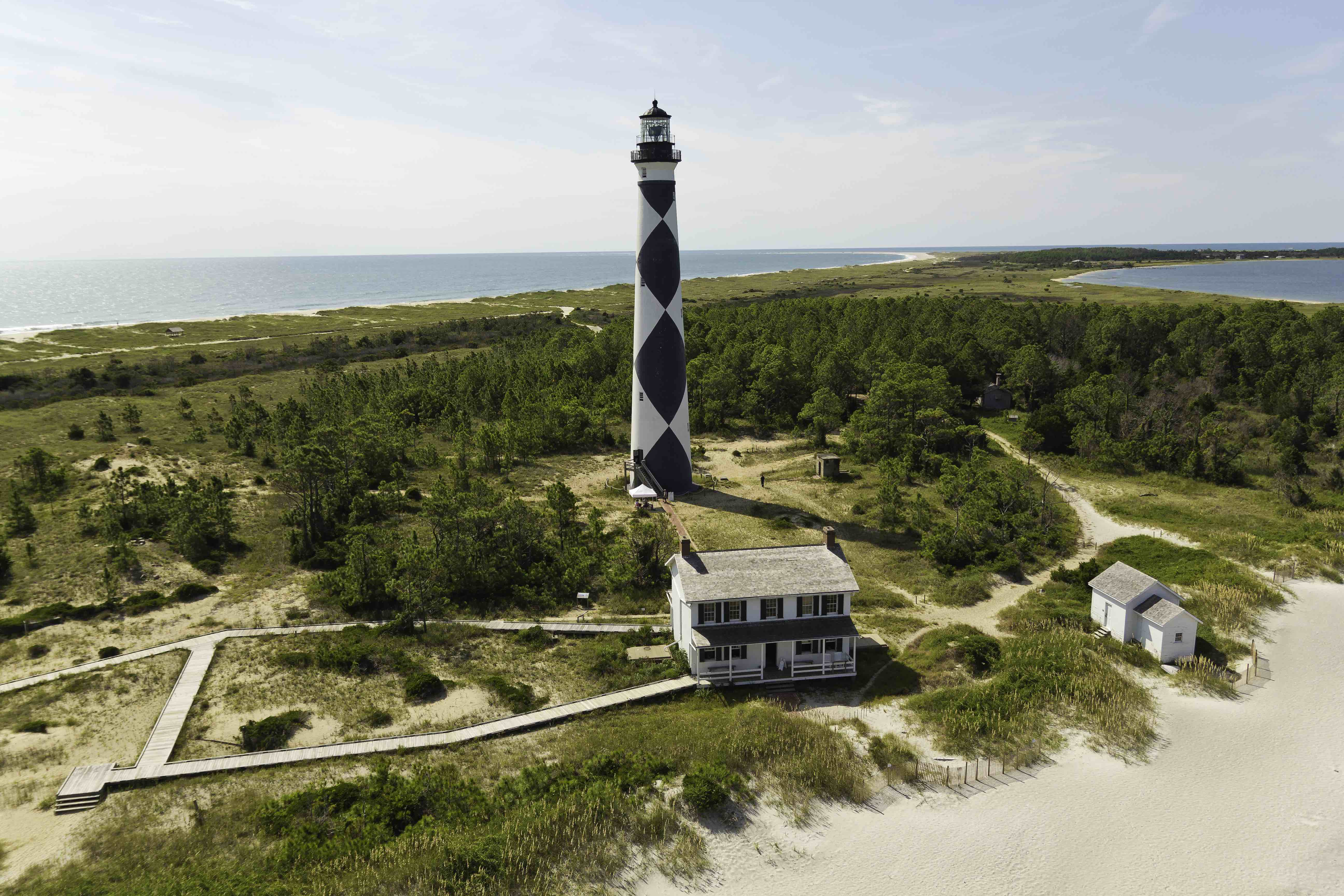

Diving and fishing also attract visitors to the Crystal Coast. This is one of the two spots in North America where the warm waters of the Gulf Stream approach the coastline, creating a "wreck diver's dream" with near-perfect conditions, according to Scuba Diving magazine. The North Carolina coast is known as the "Graveyard of the Atlantic;" more than 2,000 vessels are recorded as having sunk along here.

During World War II, German U-boats frequently targeted and sank merchant vessels in this area. The clear warm waters enable divers to view them 100 feet beneath the sea. In the 21st century, the Lionfish, a venomous non-native invasive species with sharp spiny fins and brick red bands covering its body, has been found in these waters, alarming conservationists. Lionfish were previously thought to inhabit only the tropical and subtropical waters of the South Pacific, Indian Ocean and the Red Sea. Diving activities include underwater photography clinics as well as shark and spear fishing dives.

The proximity of the Gulf Stream makes the Crystal Coast a popular fishing destination. The warm waters provide this area with the longest fishing season on the Atlantic coast. One of the largest fishing tournaments in the world, the Big Rock Blue Marlin Tournament, is run from Morehead City. Other fish caught along the Crystal Coast include bluefin tuna, yellowfin tuna, red drum, false albacore, sea trout, striped bass, cobia, sailfish, dolphin and wahoo. Several private charters operate fishing excursions. Headboat fishing trips can take up to 100 people, making them more affordable for more families.

=== Pine Knoll Shores, Morehead City and Atlantic Beach ===
The North Carolina Aquarium at Pine Knoll Shores is one of three such aquariums located along the North Carolina coast, with the other two at Fort Fisher, in the town of Kure Beach, and on Roanoke Island on the Outer Banks. All three have been recently renovated and enlarged. The Pine Knoll Shores museum exhibit “Living Shipwreck” features a life-sized replica of a German U-352 submarine. It also has a 50,000-gallon habitat that replicates the debris field found at a dive site thought to be the remains of the Queen Anne's Revenge, the flagship of the infamous pirate, Blackbeard.

Morehead City is one of two North Carolina seaports, with the other at Wilmington. For nearly 40 years, the waterfront has hosted the North Carolina Seafood Festival, the largest three-day festivals in the state.

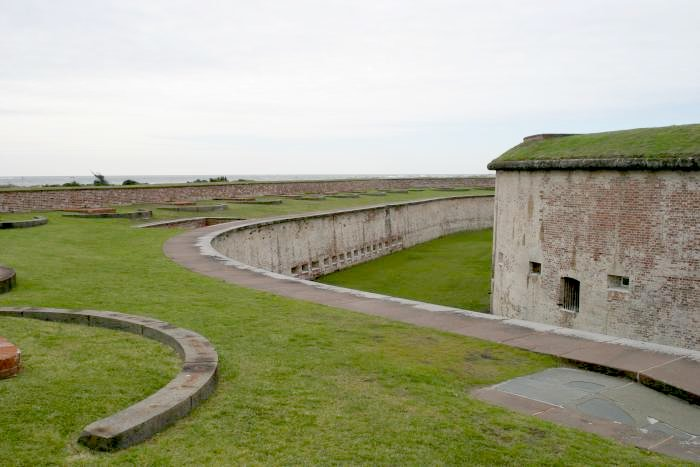
Entrance to Fort Macon

In Atlantic Beach, Fort Macon is a major draw for its Civil War history; it is the second most-visited state park in North Carolina. During the war, the fort changed hands several times between Union and Confederate forces. Afterward it fell into disrepair but was restored in 1934 as a part of the state park system, during a period of public investment in infrastructure and parks. During World War II, the federal government took over the fort, using it to protect a number of important nearby facilities. Returned to the state, the park preserves a protected beach.

=== Beaufort and Harkers Island ===
Historic Beaufort and Down East Carteret County are known for their history and culture. Beaufort (pronounced "Bo-furt") is the third-oldest Anglo-European town in North Carolina, after Bath and New Bern. It is the site of the North Carolina Maritime Museum, the official repository for all the artifacts discovered on the Queen Anne’s Revenge. Displays include seashells from around the world, with 5,000 specimens from more than 100 countries. At the museum's Watercraft Center, volunteers build and restore boats in an effort to preserve the Crystal Coast's tradition of "backyard boat-building."

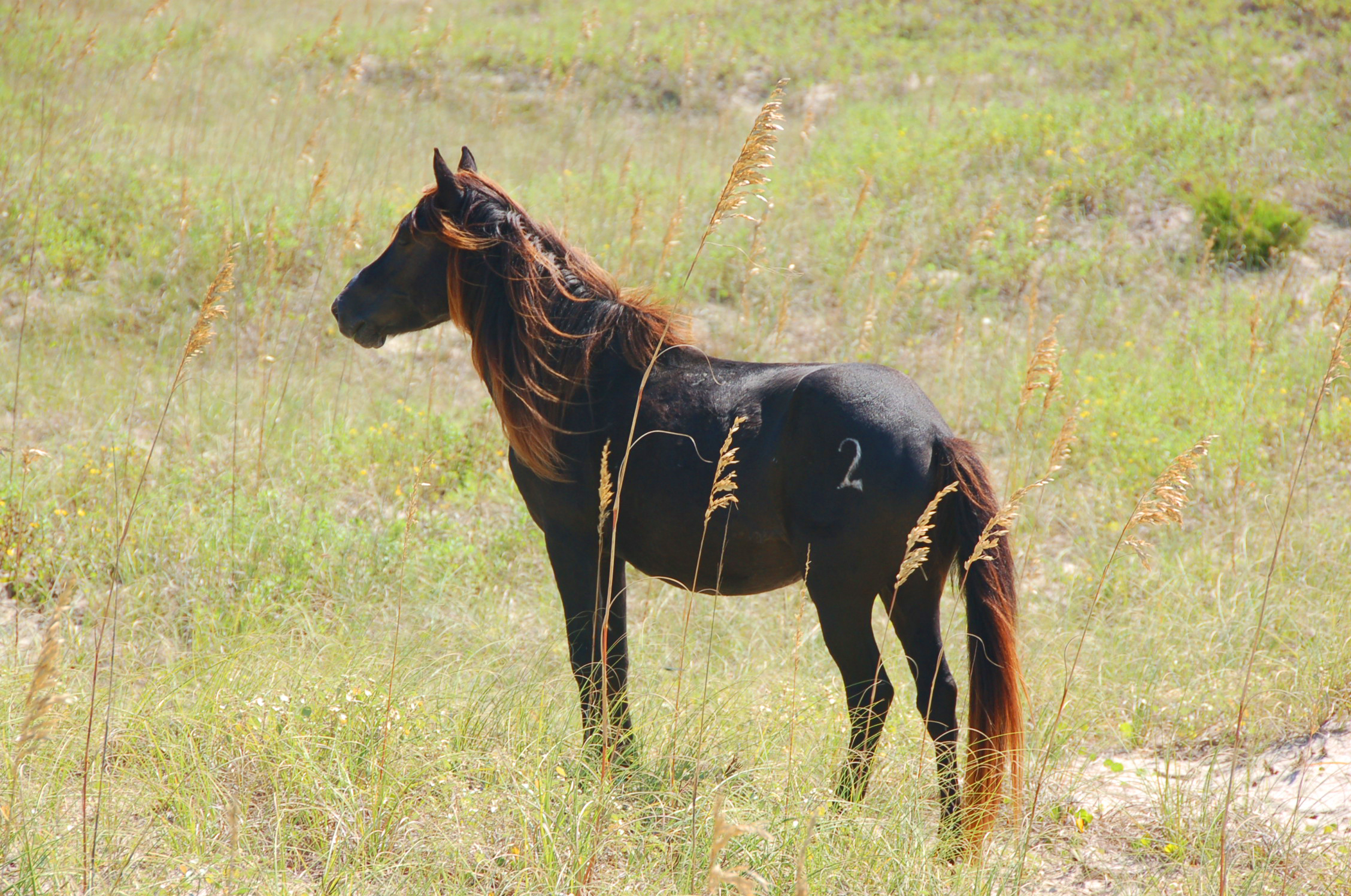
Feral horse on Shackleford

On nearby Harkers Island, the Core Sound Waterfowl Museum displays and helps preserve the island residents' practice of decoy carving. Skilled artisans carve a perfect replica of different varieties of ducks from a block of wood. Residents used the wooden ducks as decoys during duck hunting season. Trips to visit the black-and-white diamond pattern lighthouse at Cape Lookout can also be made from Beaufort and Harker's Island. Nearby Shackleford Banks is home to herds of feral horses, known as Bankers.

== Neighbors ==
The Core Sound shoreline communities east of Beaufort are known as the "Down East" area of North Carolina. As they are in Carteret County, they are technically part of the Crystal Coast. The beaches and islands north of here, starting with Portsmouth Island and Ocracoke, are known as the Outer Banks.

South of the Crystal Coast is an undeveloped stretch of coast around the mouth of the New River that is part of the Camp Lejeune military base near Jacksonville. The next developed area to the south is Topsail Island in Onslow County.

== Places ==
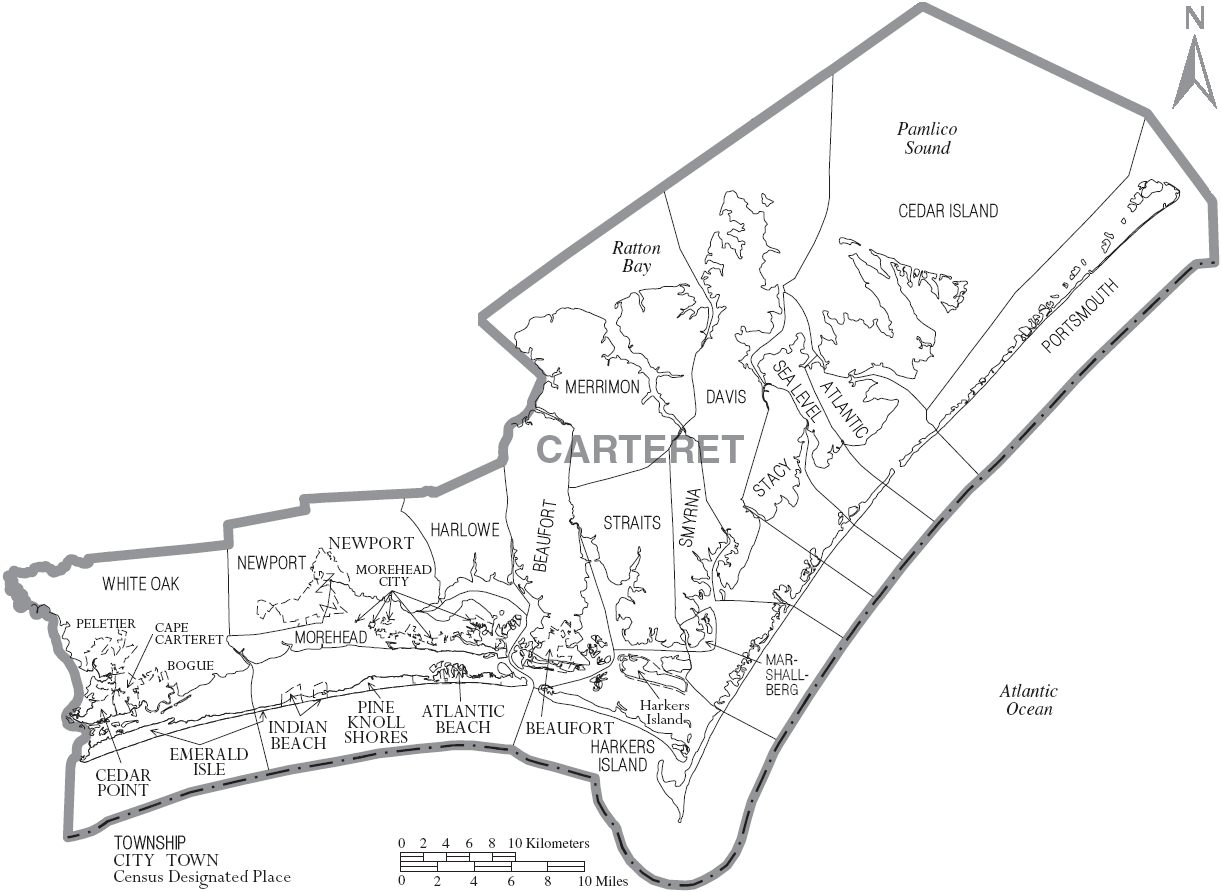
Map of Carteret County with municipal and township labels

The following are the communities, islands, military bases, and parks most commonly associated with the Crystal Coast:

- Atlantic
- Atlantic Beach
- Beaufort
- Bogue
- Broad Creek, North Carolina
- Cape Carteret
- Cape Lookout National Seashore
- Cedar Point
- Emerald Isle
- Fort Macon
- Harkers Island
- Indian Beach
- Morehead City
- Newport
- Peletier
- Pine Knoll Shores
- Salter Path
- Sealevel
- Shackleford Banks

== See also ==
- Inner Banks
- Intracoastal Waterway
- Outer Banks
