= Bogue Sound =

Lagoon in North Carolina

Coordinates: 34°41′48″N 76°56′09″W

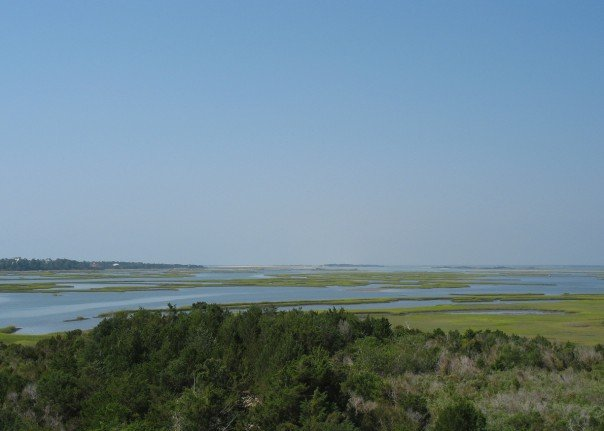
- Bogue Sound as viewed from the B. Cameron Langston Bridge in Emerald Isle, North Carolina
- Interactive map of Bogue Sound
- Location: North Carolina, U.S.

Bogue Sound is a lagoon in the state of North Carolina separating the Bogue Banks, a 21-mile-long (34 km) barrier island, from the mainland. The sound is part of North Carolina's "Crystal Coast", a tourism marketing term that is also used interchangeably with the term "Southern Outer Banks." It is the southwestern-most sound among the interconnected series of sounds along the Outer Banks that starts in the northeast at Currituck Sound.

Nine communities, all located within Carteret County, North Carolina, are located along the shores of the sound. On Bogue Banks are the communities of (from east to west) Atlantic Beach, Pine Knoll Shores, Salter Path, Indian Beach, Emerald Isle, while on the mainland are the communities of (from east to west) Beaufort, Morehead City, Cape Carteret, and Cedar Point. Morehead City's commercial port is accessed via the Bogue Sound.

Bogue Sound is encircled by three highways. NC 58 runs most of the length of Bogue Banks, while NC 24 and US 70 follow the mainland coast. Two bridges cross the sound at either end: The B. Cameron Langston Bridge, carrying NC 58, which connects Emerald Isle to both Cedar Point and Cape Carteret, and the Atlantic Beach Causeway from Morehead City to Atlantic Beach. The entire sound forms a portion of the Atlantic Intracoastal Waterway.

A few small islands in the sound were used for test bombing by airplanes around the time of World War II, and signs at certain points in Bogue Sound warn people of unexploded ordnance. The sound is home to Marine Corps' landing field, Bogue Field.

== See also ==
- Crystal Coast
- Waterways forming and crossings of the Atlantic Intracoastal Waterway
