= Bogue Banks =

Barrier island off of North Carolina

Coordinates: 34.682911°N 76.891937°W

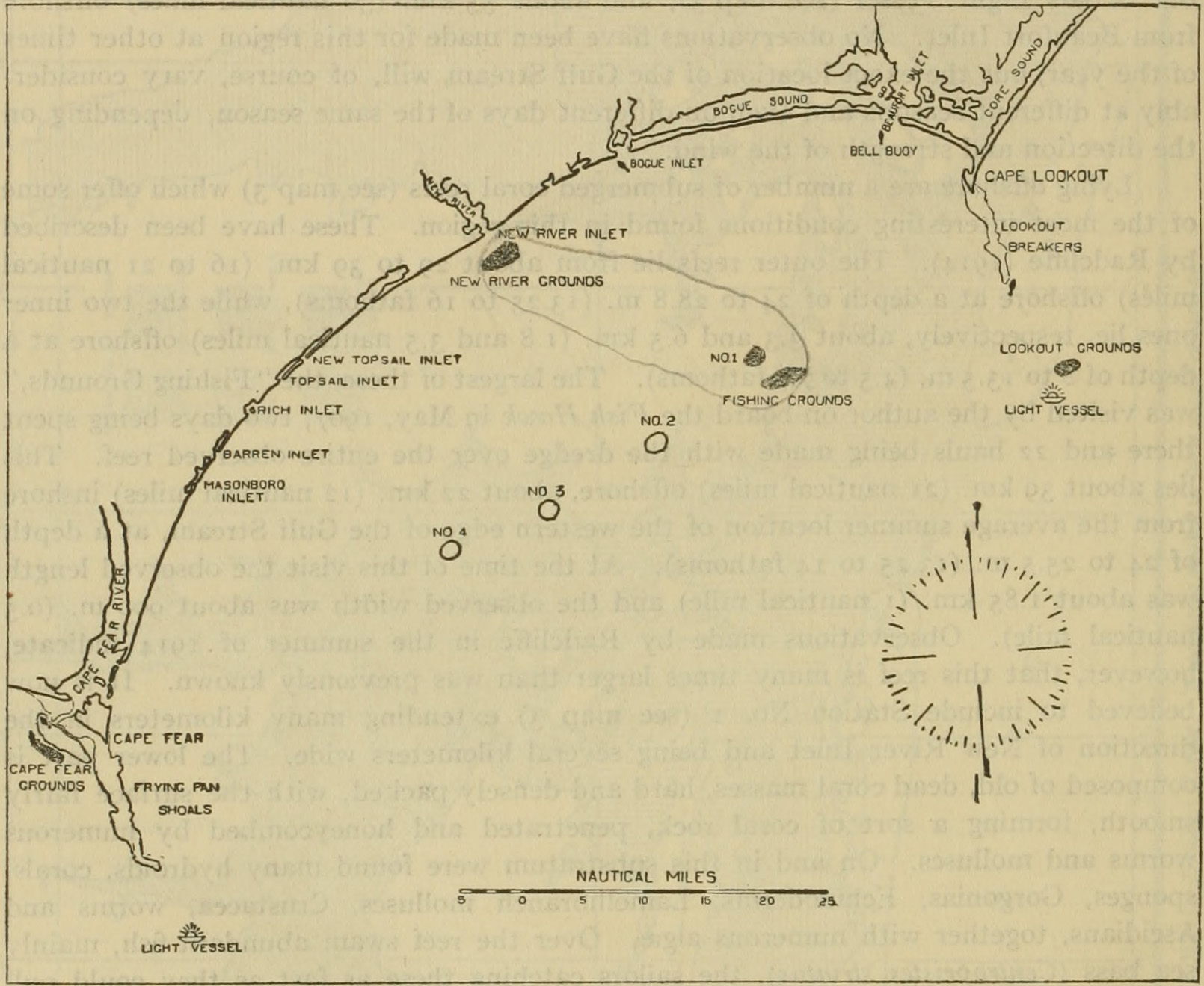
Map of Onslow Bay. Bogue Banks is the narrow barrier island separated from the mainland by Bogue Sound

Bogue Banks form a 21-mile (34 km) barrier island off the mainland of North Carolina in Carteret County. The island, separated from the mainland by Bogue Sound, runs east to west, with the ocean beaches facing due south. Bogue Banks is the only island on the Carteret County shore that has been developed with housing: numerous communities are located on the island and can be accessed by one of two bridges across Bogue Sound, either from Morehead City to Atlantic Beach, which is the more heavily traveled bridge, or from Cape Carteret to Emerald Isle. The communities of Bogue Banks are the most prominent of the Crystal Coast. NC 58 traverses a majority of the island's length. There are several hotels that dot the island, but most of the land contains private houses, some of which are rented out during the summer, or maritime forest. Stores and other commercial properties are limited to the five main communities.

== History ==
During a survey titled "The Greater Beaufort Area at 1800" completed by the North Carolina State College, or present-day North Carolina State University's School of Design preserves the original place names for the area surrounding Beaufort. The School of Design delineators were; L. B. Askew Jr., W. M. Coble and E. H. Williams Jr. and show the place name of present-day Bogue Banks as Bordens Banks with the present-day inlet near Beaufort, North Carolina as Topsail Inlet. Also represented is the present-day location of Morehead City, North Carolina, known in 1800 as Shepard's Point, which was owned by the Shepards Point Land Company.

=== Salter Path ===
The decline in the whaling industry in the mid-to-late 19th century and good fishing on Bogue Banks caused many settlers, mostly near Cape Lookout (Diamond City), to move toward the middle and western reaches of Bogue Banks. The community of Salter Path is believed to be named after Owen Salter or possibly Riley Salter although Riley Salter’s true whereabouts during the 1880s has been questioned by historians and native Bogue Bankers. Schools of mullet that ran close to the ocean shorelines were the prime catch for many of the natives. These fishermen would quickly tramp from the sound to the ocean, wearing a path in front of a Salter household, hence the name Salter Path. Many of the families who moved to Salter Path in the late 19th century and early 20th century established their residences without deeds before Bostonian John A. Royall purchased Salter Path and 8,000 acres on Bogue Banks in 1910. Royall acquired nearly two thirds of the Island. (8,000 acres). The area of Salter Path subsequently became known as a squatters' community until Royall later provided deeds to any of the families on Salter Path who had an actual structure. Royall and his wife, Agatha Freeman Royall, helped the Salter Path families establish a school and a church for their community.

John Royall built a house on the island known as Pine Court. Royall was a conservationist and steward to the natural beauty of the island In addition to the main house, Royall built a physician’s cottage (later renovated and leased to Alice Green Hoffman) and a Tea House on the ocean side of the island now a popular look-out.

In 1923, John A. Royall sold 2,000 acres of his property to Alice Green Hoffman, a distant relative of Theodore Roosevelt and daughter of Alfred Green. Alice Hoffman renovated and added on to John A. Royall’s main estate in present-day Pine Knoll Shores. After purchasing the property from Royall, Alice Hoffman sued the residents of Salter Path in 1923 because their cows were wandering onto her estate. A subsequent court decision permitted the residents of Salter Path to remain, but the cows were not allowed to graze on the Hoffman estate. The village was restricted to 81 acres (330,000 m^{2}) that the squatters occupied, and direct ownership of the beachfront was granted to the village to use collectively. This ruling further stated that only current residents and descendants could occupy the property, but it did not give any individuals title to the land. This ruling remained intact until 1979 when a legal settlement permitted Salter Path residents to hold title to their property and for Carteret County to levy taxes on the former squatter’s village.

== Points of interest ==
The Emerald Isle Coast Guard Station is located on the western end of Bogue Banks; Fort Macon State Park, located on the eastern end, beyond Atlantic Beach, saw action during the Civil War; there the ornithologist and naturalist Elliott Coues spent two years, 1869–70, as US Army surgeon, taking the opportunity to study the sea birds, marsh birds and shore birds that nested there, noting lynx and mink, "describing a coastal world scarcely touched by commercial fishing, much less by the unrestrained tourism and real-estate development of today". Today, with some of the highest sand dunes on the East Coast, it is North Carolina's most visited state park. The North Carolina Aquarium, one of three, is located in Pine Knoll Shores in the middle of the island. Surrounding the aquarium is the Theodore Roosevelt Natural Area, a 265-acre (1.07 km^{2}) maritime forest owned, maintained and protected by the state. It is one of the few remaining maritime forests on North Carolina's barrier islands. A historic marker stands at the corner of N.C. 58 and Pine Knoll Boulevard (at mile marker 7), noting the spot of the first landing of Europeans on the North Carolina coast. Giovanni da Verrazzano, a Florentine navigator in the service of France, explored the state's coast from Cape Fear to Kitty Hawk in 1524. His voyage along the coast marked the first recorded European contact with what is now North Carolina.

== Communities ==
The island is located in Morehead Township and White Oak Township. The following are communities on Bogue Banks:

- Atlantic Beach
- Emerald Isle
- Indian Beach
- Pine Knoll Shores
- Salter Path

== Surrounding waters ==
- Onslow Bay (Atlantic Ocean) - south
- Bogue Sound (Intracoastal Waterway) - north
- Bogue Inlet - west
- Beaufort Inlet - east
- White Oak River - northwest
- Newport River - northeast

== Bogue Inlet Fishing Pier ==
The Bogue Inlet Fishing Pier, located on the western end of the Bogue Banks is one of the only fishing piers left on the island. In 2006, a beachfront development company applied to purchase the pier's land for the construction of condos. However, many area residents and Emerald Isle city officials are now petitioning to stop demolition of the pier.
