= North Carolina Highway 58 =

State highway in North Carolina, US

North Carolina Highway 58

- Route of NC 58 highlighted in red

Route information
- Maintained by NCDOT
- Length: 175.8 mi (282.9 km)
- Existed: 1920s–present
- Tourist routes: Blue-Gray Scenic Byway

Major junctions
- South end: Fort Macon State Park in Atlantic Beach
- US 17 in Maysville; US 70 / US 258 in Kinston; US 13 / US 258 in Snow Hill; I-587 / US 264 near Wilson; US 301 / US 264 Alt. in Wilson; US 64 in Nashville
- North end: US 401 / US 158 Bus. in Warrenton

Location
- Country: United States
- State: North Carolina
- Counties: Carteret, Jones, Lenoir, Greene, Wilson, Nash, Franklin, Warren

Highway system
- North Carolina Highway System; Interstate; US; State; Scenic
← NC 57	→ NC 60

North Carolina Highway 58 (NC 58) is a primary state highway in the U.S. state of North Carolina that traverses the state's Coastal Plain. The route links many of the Crystal Coast communities along its eastern segment. Its southern terminus is at the visitor center parking lot for Fort Macon State Park in Atlantic Beach and its northern terminus is at the intersection of US 401 and US 158 Business in Warrenton. The highway traverses nearly the entire length of the Bogue Banks and serves the major cities of Kinston, Snow Hill, and Wilson.

== Route description ==
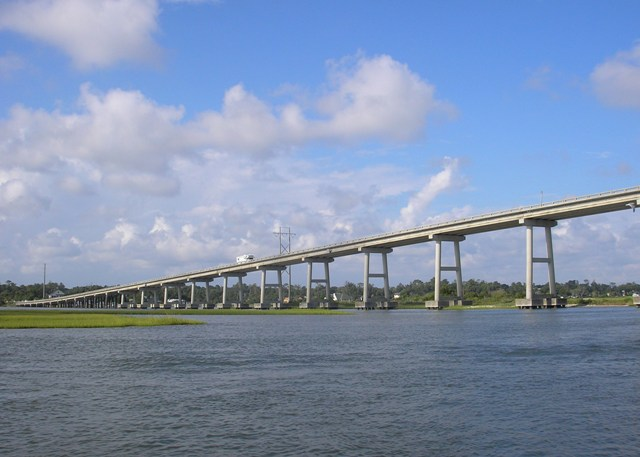
The B. Cameron Langston Bridge over Bogue Sound.

NC 58 begins from the visitor center parking lot at Fort Macon State Park—formerly County Road 1190—and begins heading west along Bogue Banks. It passes through Atlantic Beach, Pine Knoll Shores, Indian Beach, and Emerald Isle as it runs along the Bogue Banks as a main highway. Approaching the west end, the highway turns north and crosses on the Emerald Island Causeway. Running by Cedar Point, the highway intersects NC 24 and then heads toward the northwest as it passes by the White Oak River Mechanical Harvesting of Oysters Prohibited Area. The route then approaches Maysville and runs concurrent with US 17 heading north until reaching Pollocksville where NC 58 splits from US 17 heading west. The highway approaches Trenton and runs concurrent with NC 41 for about 2.9 miles (4.7 km). NC 58 then enters Kinston and runs concurrent with US 70 until reaching the intersection with US 258, where the route turns to the north and runs concurrent with US 70 Bus. and US 258 Bus., crossing over the Neuse River via Frederick Jones Bridge. Heading through downtown, the highway begins running concurrently with NC 11 until reaching the intersection with Vernon Avenue, where NC 58 splits from US 70 Bus., US 258 Bus. and NC 11. NC 11 heads east while the business routes head west.

The route then continues north after exiting Kingston and intersects NC 123 and US 258 before entering Snow Hill. It then runs concurrent with US 13 for about 1.3 miles (2.1 km). The highway then continues northwest and intersects and runs concurrent with NC 222 through Stantonsburg. It then interchanges with I-587 and US 264 and then runs concurrent with US 264 Alt. for 1.6 miles (2.6 km), intersecting NC 91 and US 301 before entering downtown Wilson. Exiting town, the highway intersects NC 42, a belt route around Wilson as it exits town. Heading north towards Nashville, NC 58 intersects NC 97 and crosses over Interstate 95 but does not have direct access to the freeway. As it enters Nashville, the route then runs concurrent with US 64 Bus. for 0.5 miles (0.80 km). It interchanges US 64 (future Interstate 87 corridor). The highway then continues north and passes through Castalia before intersecting the eastern terminus of NC 56. Then, NC 58 intersects NC 43 before entering Warrenton, running concurrent with US 158 Bus. and then reaching its northern terminus at US 401.

== Major intersections ==
County	Location	mi	km	Destinations	Notes
Carteret	Atlantic Beach	0.0	0.0	Fort Macon State Park	
Carteret	Bogue Sound	21.3– 22.1	34.3– 35.6	B. Cameron Langston Bridge	
Carteret	Cedar Point–Cape Carteret line	22.8	36.7	NC 24 (Cedar Point Boulevard / W.B. McLean Drive) – Jacksonville, Swansboro, Cape Carteret, Morehead City	
Jones	Maysville	41.2	66.3	US 17 south (Main Street) / 8th Street – Jacksonville	Southern end of US 17 concurrency
Jones	Ravenswood	48.2	77.6	US 17 north – Pollocksville, New Bern	Northern end of US 17 concurrency
Jones	Trenton	58.0	93.3	NC 41 east (Jones Street) / Market Street – Cove City	Southern end of NC 41 concurrency
Jones		60.9	98.0	NC 41 west / Middle Road – Beulaville	Northern end of NC 41 concurrency
Lenoir	Kinston	77.5	124.7	US 70 east / Trenton Road – New Bern	Southern end of US 70 concurrency
Lenoir	Kinston	78.4	126.2	US 70 west / US 258 / US 70 Bus. begins / US 258 Bus. begins – Goldsboro, Raleigh, Jacksonville	Northern end of US 70 concurrency; southern end of US 70 Bus. / US 258 Bus. concurrency
Lenoir	Kinston	79.3	127.6	NC 11 / NC 55 (King Street) – Greenville	
Lenoir	Kinston	80.0	128.7	US 70 Bus. west / US 258 Bus. north (Vernon Avenue) – Goldsboro	Northern end of US 70 Bus. / US 258 Bus. concurrency
Lenoir		84.8	136.5	NC 148 south (C.F. Harvey Parkway) to US 258 – Kinston Regional Jetport	Northern terminus of NC 148
Greene	Glenfield Crossroads	89.5	144.0	NC 123 north / Glenfield Road – Hookerton	Southern terminus of NC 123
Greene	Snow Hill	94.1	151.4	US 258 (2nd Street) / US 258 Truck begins – Jacksonville, Kinston	Southern end of US 258 Truck concurrency
Greene	Snow Hill	95.4	153.5	NC 903 south (Harper Street) – LaGrange	Southern end of NC 903 concurrency
Greene	Snow Hill	95.6	153.9	US 13 north / US 258 Truck north / NC 903 north (Martin Luther King Jr. Parkway) – Greenville	Northern end of US 258 Truck / NC 903 concurrencies; southern end of US 13 concurrency
Greene		96.8	155.8	US 13 south – Goldsboro	Northern end of US 13 concurrency
Wilson	Stantonsburg	109.8	176.7	NC 111 north / NC 222 east (Saratoga Street) – Saratoga	Southern end of NC 111 / NC 222 concurrency
Wilson	Stantonsburg	110.2	177.3	NC 111 south / NC 222 west (Main Street) – Eureka	Northern end of NC 111 / NC 222 concurrency
Wilson		115.1– 115.3	185.2– 185.6	I-587 / US 264 – Greenville, Raleigh	Exit 49 (I-587/US 264)
Wilson	Wilson	117.4	188.9	US 264 Alt. east / Charleston Street	Southern end of US 254 Alt. concurrency
Wilson	Wilson	118.9	191.4	US 301 south / US 264 Alt. west (Ward Boulevard) / Nash Street – Smithfield	Northern end of US 254 Alt. concurrency; southern end of US 301 concurrency
Wilson	Wilson	119.4	192.2	US 301 north / Lipscomb Road – Rocky Mount	Northern end of US 301 concurrency
Wilson	Wilson	120.0	193.1	NC 42 east (Herring Avenue)	Southern end of NC 42 concurrency
Wilson	Wilson	123.0	197.9	NC 42 west (Ward Boulevard) / Nash Street	Northern end of NC 42 concurrency
Nash	Winstead Crossroads	129.7	208.7	NC 97 to I-95 – Rocky Mount–Wilson Regional Airport	
Nash	Nashville	139.5	224.5	US 64 Bus. east (Washington Street) / First Street – Rocky Mount	Southern end of US 64 Bus. concurrency
Nash	Nashville	140.0	225.3	US 64 Bus. west (Barnes Street) – Spring Hope	Northern end of US 64 Bus. concurrency
Nash	Nashville	140.4– 140.5	226.0– 226.1	US 64 – Rocky Mount, Raleigh	Exit 459 (US 64)
Nash		150.9	242.9	NC 56 west – Louisburg	Eastern terminus of NC 56
Franklin	Centerville	158.2	254.6	NC 561 – Louisburg, Halifax	
Warren	Liberia	171.1	275.4	NC 43 south – Rocky Mount	Northern terminus of NC 43
Warren		175.3	282.1	US 158 Bus. east – Macon	Southern end of US 158 Bus. concurrency
Warren	Warrenton	175.8	282.9	US 401 / US 158 Bus. west (Main Street) / Macon Street	Northern end of US 158 Bus. concurrency
1.000 mi = 1.609 km; 1.000 km = 0.621 mi: Concurrency terminus
