= Salter (trap) =

Structure

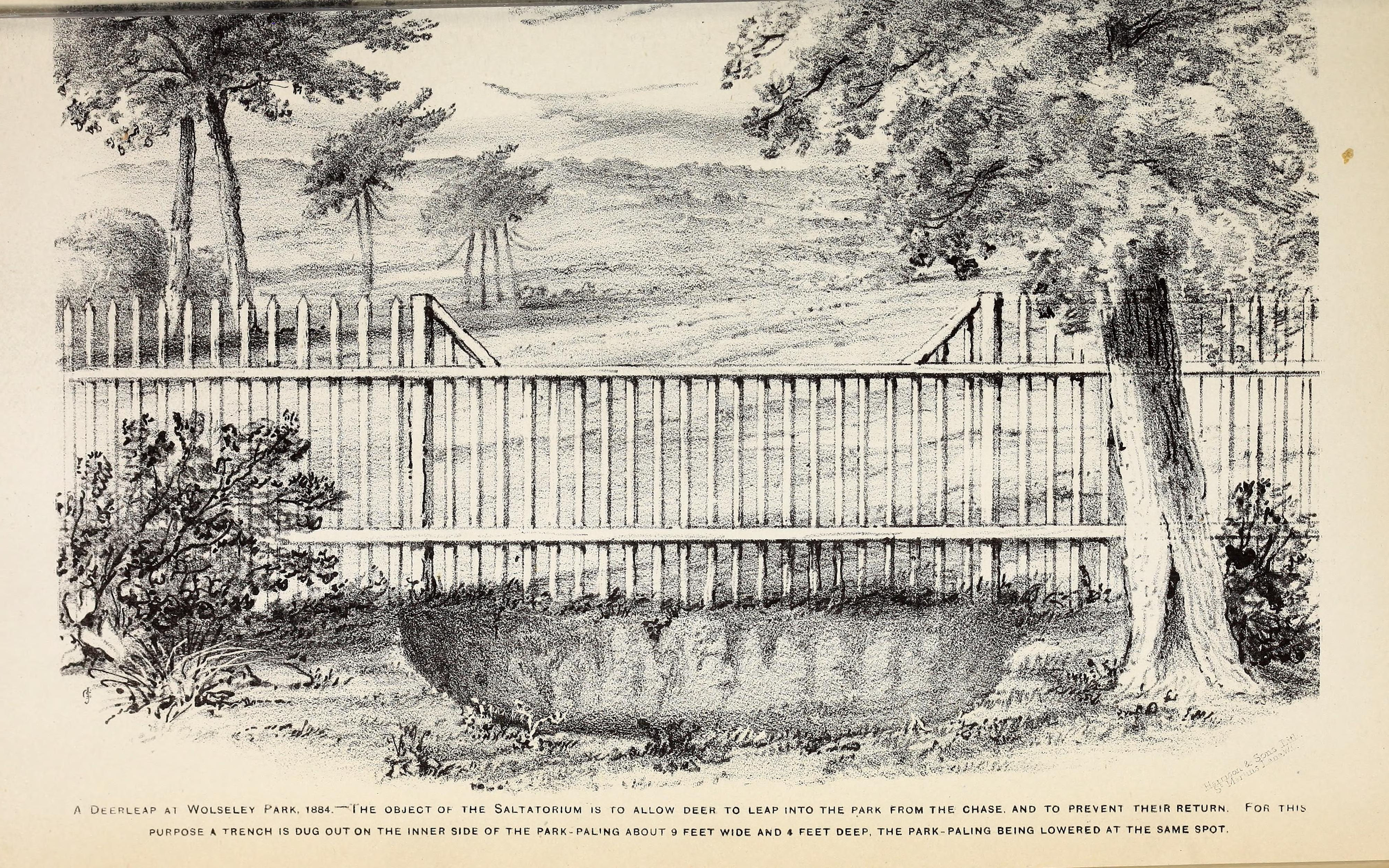

A salter is a structure that enabled deer to leap into an enclosed area but prevented them from leaving. From the Latin saltare, "to jump." Now the word provides understanding in the study of toponymic surnames, and toponymy, or the study of place names.

Salters were used to populate private deer parks. "Salter" may be preferred over "deer-leap", which is ambiguous and does not convey its "one-way" nature. It is a shortening of the term saltatorium.

Historically, salters were prized and highly regulated as gifts from the monarchy. For example, in 1358, Edward III granted "for the king's special affection for Mary de Sancto Paulo, Countess of Pembroke, that for her life she shall have two deer-leaps in her park Fodryngeye."

== Construction ==
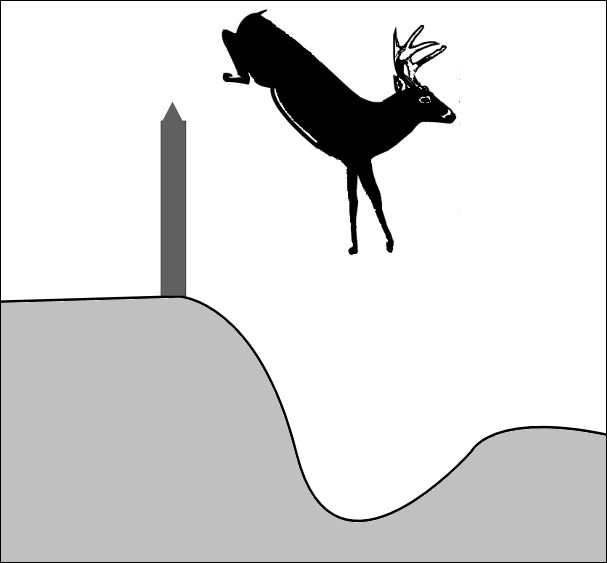
Salter construction

A salter consists of a short ditch, with one side higher than the other. The high side is topped by a picket-style fence or palisade, while the low side is planted to attract deer. Natural features were sometimes used, such as rock walls or ledges from which deer leapt, but were unable to leap back.

== Place names ==
In toponymy, the concern is that the root "salt" contained in the word resulted in misleading folk etymologies, particularly in place names with questionable connection to salt or individuals named Salter. Historian and toponymist Mary C. Higham provides evidence that such places as Salter Street, London, Saltley, Salterford, and even Salt Hill, UK derive their names from these salters, rather than salt or the surname Salter. In America, it brings into question the toponymy of Salter Path, NC, and three Salter Islands in Canada.
