= North Carolina Aquariums =

North Carolina Aquarium

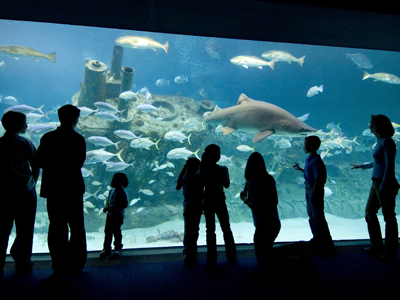
- A "Live Dive!" program at the North Carolina Aquarium at Pine Knoll Shores.
- Date opened: 1976
- Volume of largest tank: Pine Knoll Shores: 306,000 US gallons (1,160,000 L; 255,000 imp gal) Roanoke Island: 285,000 US gallons (1,080,000 L; 237,000 imp gal) Fort Fisher: 235,000 US gallons (890,000 L; 196,000 imp gal)
- Total volume of tanks: Fort Fisher: 455,000 US gallons (1,720,000 L; 379,000 imp gal) Pine Knoll Shores: 430,000 US gallons (1,600,000 L; 360,000 imp gal) Roanoke Island: 410,000 US gallons (1,600,000 L; 340,000 imp gal)
- Memberships: AZA
- Website: www.ncaquariums.com

North Carolina Aquariums is a system of three public aquariums located in Fort Fisher, Roanoke Island and Pine Knoll Shores. All are operated by the Aquariums Division of the North Carolina Department of Natural and Cultural Resources since 1976 and were accredited by the Association of Zoos and Aquariums. All three aquariums feature dive shows, live animal encounters, and feeding programs.

== North Carolina Aquarium at Fort Fisher ==
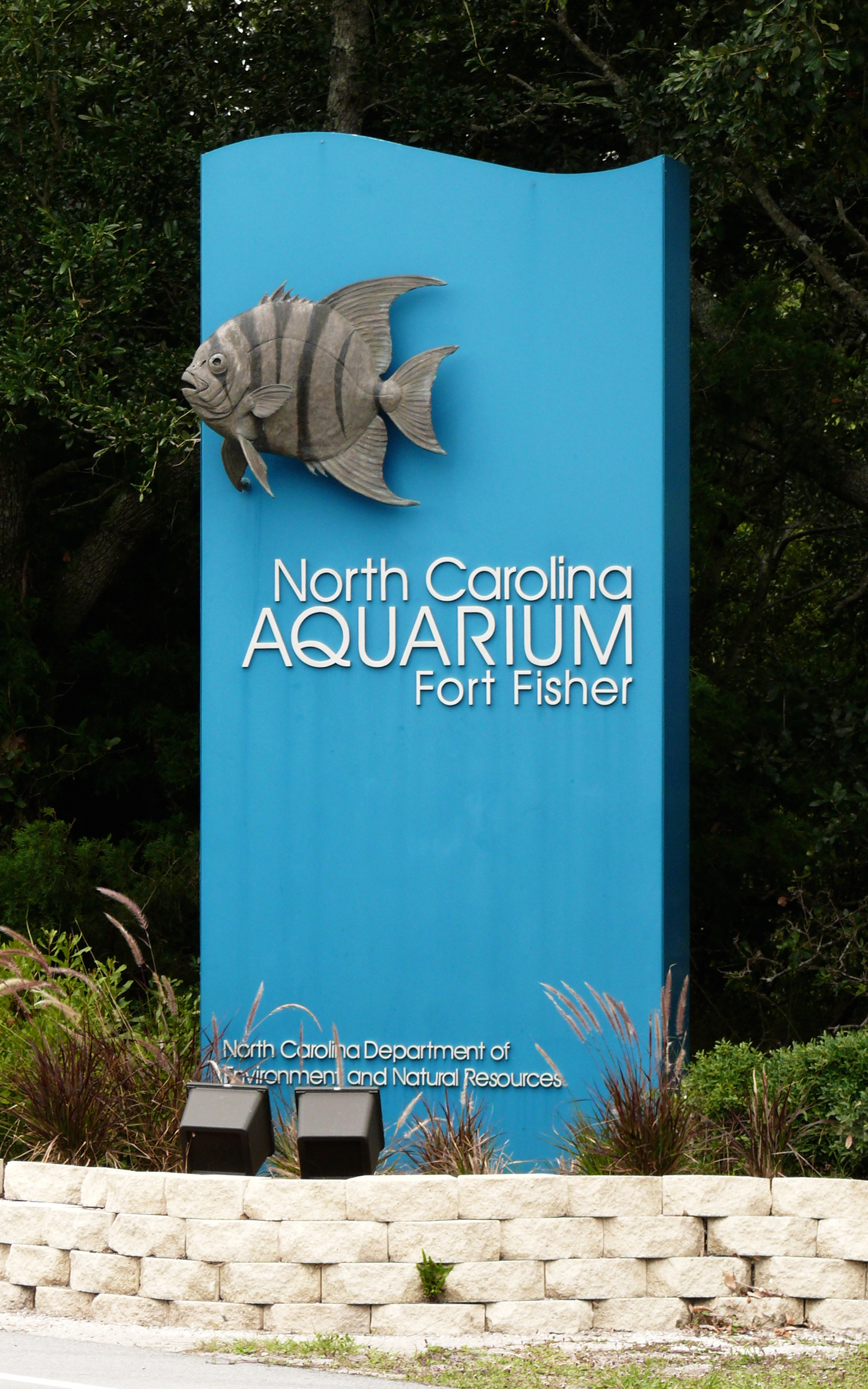
Sign for the aquarium

The focus of the North Carolina Aquarium at Fort Fisher, in Kure Beach, is to educate visitors about the waters of the Cape Fear region. The aquarium was recently named among the Best Aquariums in the United States by the Travel Channel and is one of the Top Ten Attractions in North Carolina. The Cape Fear Conservatory, the visitors' first stop in the aquarium, features freshwater life. In this large, tree-filled atrium, streams, ponds and swamps are home to frogs, snakes, bass, catfish, and perch. Box turtles hide among the Conservatory's groundcover. American alligators native to North Carolina occupy one of the larger exhibits in the Conservatory. An albino alligator exhibit opened in 2009. In 2006, the aquarium opened an exhibit featuring the venomous snakes of the region, including several species of rattlesnake, copperheads, and cottonmouths.

The Coastal Waters Gallery, which includes the Coquina Outcrop Touch Pool, provides hands-on opportunities to learn about sea urchins, horseshoe crabs, whelks, and other creatures of a rocky outcrop surf zone. Masonboro Inlet Jetty features the fishes common around a wave-washed rock jetty, an indoor salt marsh, a sea horse habitat, and a loggerhead sea turtle display.

The Open Oceans Gallery includes Sharkstooth Ledge, which features fish common to offshore North Carolina, such as pufferfish, hogfish, and filefish. The gallery also displays octopus, jellyfish, and corals native to the state's waters. A new multimedia suite features an extinct whale-eating shark called megalodon. This exhibit have been opened on July 1, 2011, and includes projections on a 23-ft curved screen, as well as interactive holograms and touch-screen interfaces.

Holding 235,000 US gallons (890,000 L; 196,000 imp gal), Cape Fear Shoals is the largest of the aquarium's saltwater exhibits. The 24-foot (7.3 m)-deep replica of an offshore reef affords two-story, multi-level views of large sharks, stingrays, groupers, and moray eels.

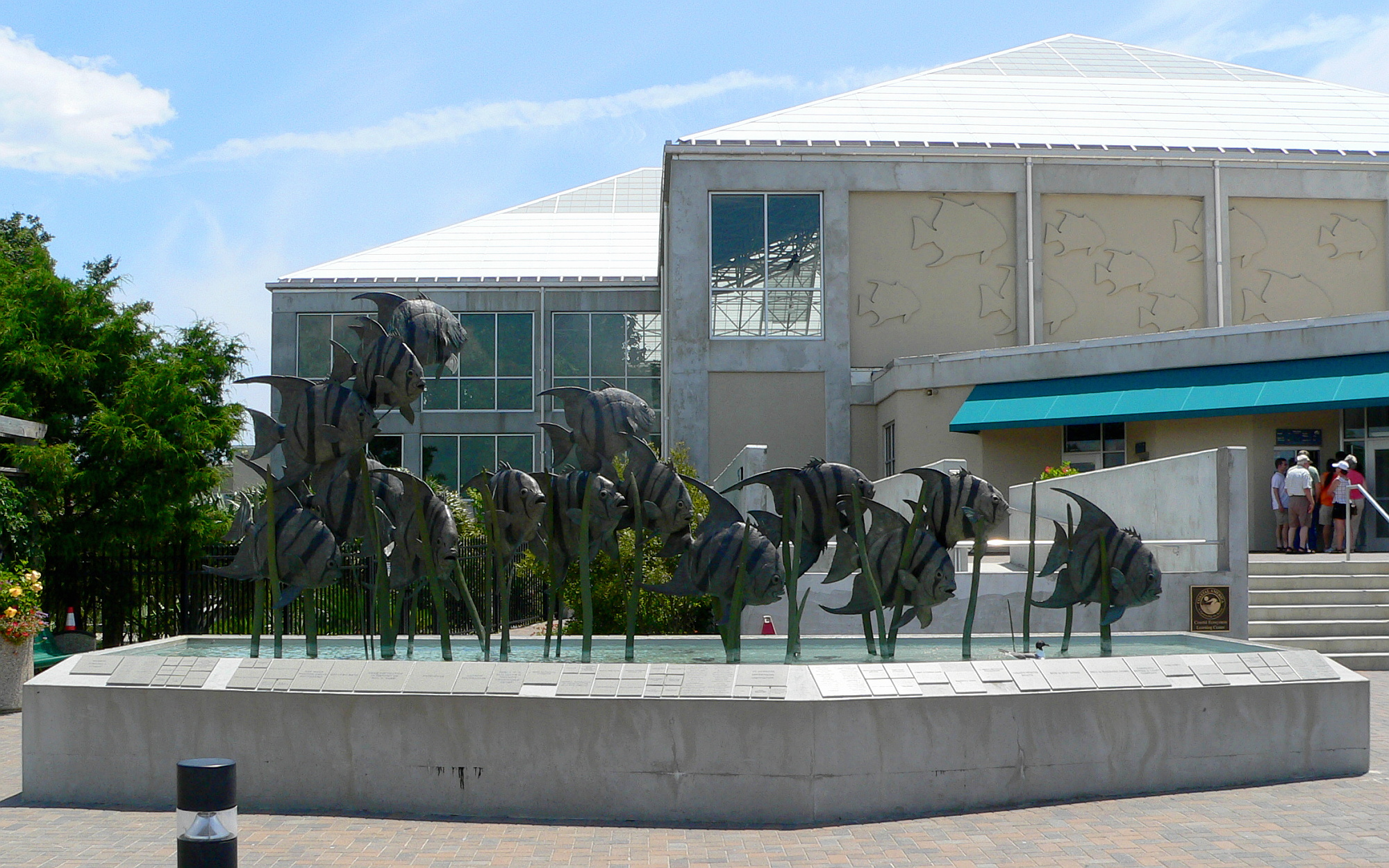
The Spadefish Sculpture outside the main entrance of the North Carolina Aquarium at Fort Fisher.

The Exotic Aquatics Display features animals native to Indo-Pacific and other ocean regions. These displays include spiny lobsters, the red lionfish (Pterois volitans), and a North Carolina native, the spotted scorpionfish. They are both known for their inconspicuous, venomous spines. Lionfish are native to the Indian and Pacific Oceans, but in 2000 were confirmed as having established themselves in North Carolina. Australian spotted jellies, recently invasive in U.S. coastal waters, are among the gallery's newer exhibits. In June 2012, the aquarium opened the Bamboo Shark Touch Pool exhibit which allows visitors to touch live bamboo sharks. Bamboo sharks are considered harmless to humans and the aquarium hopes to educate visitors about sharks through interaction.

The 550-US-gallon (2,100 L; 460 imp gal) Pacific Reef Display features living corals, giant clams, sea anemones, cardinalfish, hawkfish, clownfish, wrasses, surgeonfish, and nearly a dozen other fish species.

=== Expansion ===
The facility closed in November 1999 for a major expansion and reopened in March 2002. The new construction increased the size of aquarium systems from 77,000 US gallons (290,000 L; 64,000 imp gal) to 455,000 US gallons (1,720,000 L; 379,000 imp gal). The expansion included the creation of the Cape Fear Shoals tank, a 235,000-US-gallon (890,000 L; 196,000 imp gal) exhibit recreating the hard bottomed coral reefs off the coast of North Carolina.

== North Carolina Aquarium at Pine Knoll Shores ==
Since reopening, the North Carolina Aquarium at Pine Knoll Shores has continued to feature aquatic animals of North Carolina. Notable among them are sand tiger sharks, a green moray eel measuring about six feet long, a goliath grouper approaching four feet, and a number of sizable nurse sharks, sandbar sharks and various game fishes.

Most of the larger creatures inhabit the aquarium's centerpiece exhibit, the 306,000-US-gallon (1,160,000 L; 255,000 imp gal) Living Shipwreck. Along with hundreds of schooling fishes and other animals, they create a swirl of constant motion around a replica of U-352, a German submarine that lost a World War II battle with a Coast Guard cutter off the North Carolina coast. The aquarium's three river otters also have lived up to expectations of stardom. With the help of the public, two were named Neuse and Pungo after North Carolina rivers. Neuse and Pungo came to the aquarium when they were about a year old in 2006. Eno, the third otter, was brought to the aquarium at four weeks old in April 2008, after his mother was killed by a car near White Lake. Aquarists bottle-fed him until he could trade formula for fish and other solid food, and helped him learn to swim. Wide viewing windows bring their playful antics and underwater agility to child-eye-level.

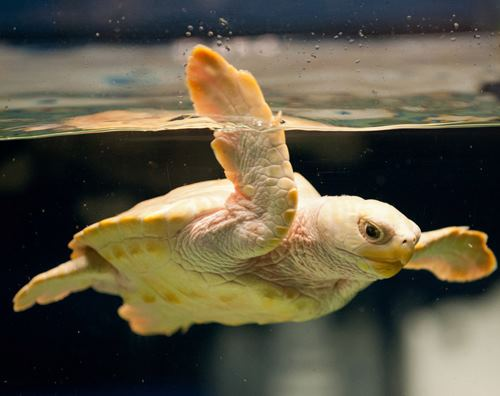
Nimbus at The North Carolina Aquarium at Pine Knoll Shores, December 2011

The North Carolina Aquarium also features two hands-on exhibits: the Tidal Touch Pool, featuring a large variety of aquatic invertebrates, and Skate and Ray Encounters.

On August 11, 2010, a rare white sea turtle was brought to the aquarium for care. The turtle, Nimbus, was weak and smaller than the average loggerhead hatchling. It turned up when a hatched-out Pine Knoll Shores nest was excavated for baby turtles left behind. Hampered by a cleft palate, it had to be coaxed into eating. Nimbus was a popular attraction at the aquarium but passed on October 4, 2023 at the age of 13.

Throughout the year the North Carolina Aquarium offers free daily programs, including live animal programs, animal feeding presentations, a "Live Dive!" show, puppet shows, quiz games and hands-on activities. A number of special activities are available for a small fee. In the summer, beginning June 1, the North Carolina Aquarium offers snorkeling, surfing classes, night treks to search for nesting sea turtles, onboard collection and river cruises, kayaking and canoeing excursions, and fishing courses. Kayaking, canoeing and fishing programs continue into the fall when seafood cooking classes are also offered. Behind-the-scenes tours, Dinner with the Critters, and Breakfast with the Rays are offered year-round.

== North Carolina Aquarium on Roanoke Island ==
North Carolina Aquarium on Roanoke Island
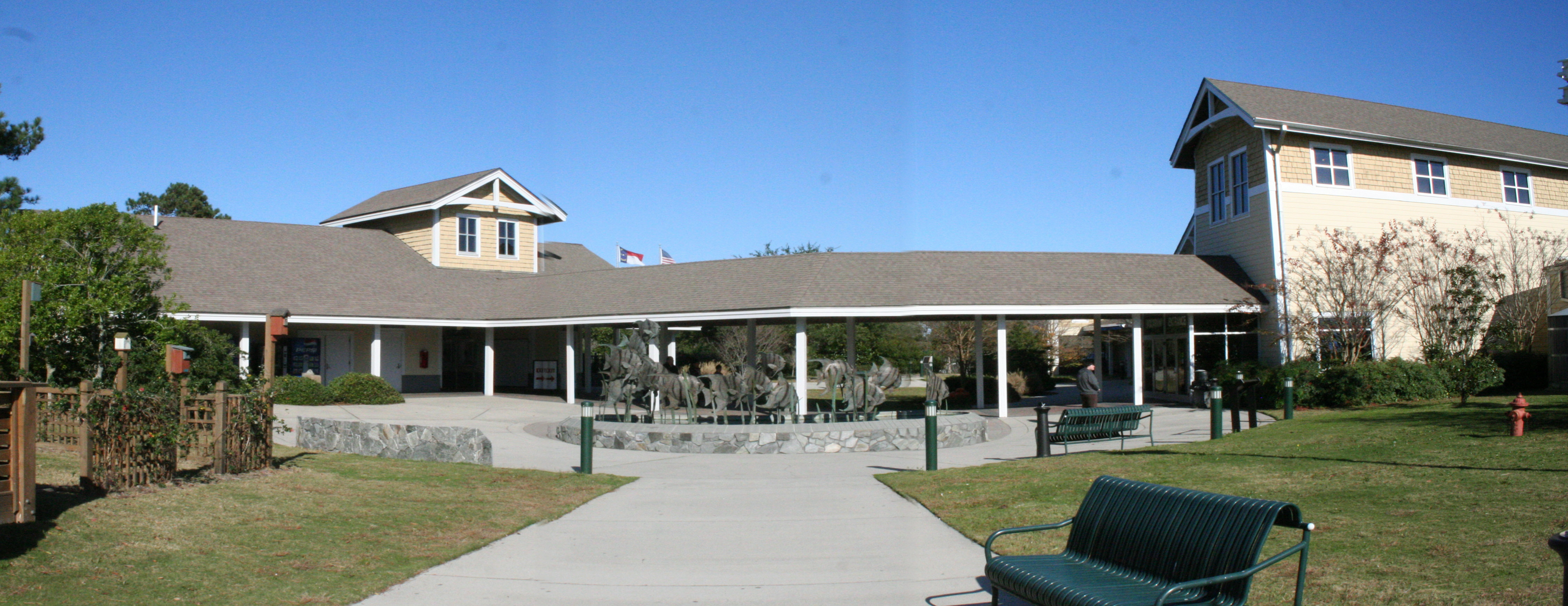
- Entrance to North Carolina Aquarium on Roanoke Island
- Website: www.ncaquariums.com

The North Carolina Aquarium on Roanoke Island is a facility located on the Outer Banks. It holds a replica of the USS Monitor, a Civil War ironclad which sank off the coast of Cape Hatteras in late December 1862. On June 27, 2014, the Sea Turtle Assistance and Rehabilitation (STAR) Center opened to the public. The Center rehabilitates endangered sea turtles, including those that have washed ashore after suffering cold-stunning in winter waters.

== Jennette's Pier ==
In 2002, the NC Aquarium Society purchased Jennette's Pier in Nags Head, the oldest pier along the Outer Banks, with plans to refurbish it as an outreach site. Those plans were put on hold in September 2003, when Hurricane Isabel destroyed the structure. Plans were made to completely rebuild Jennette's as a concrete structure with a 1,000-foot (300 m) pier. $25 million was set aside for construction which began in early 2009. On May 21, 2011, Jennette's Pier was finally reopened to the public. Year-round education programs and week-long summer camps focused on ethical practices in recreational fishing, marine science, and resource conservation are conducted at the pier. Jennette's Pier is self-supporting and receives no state appropriations to operate. Three wind turbines on the pier when repaired and upgraded will provide a significant portion of the pier's electricity. The pier is also utilized as a platform for ocean-related scientific research projects.

== In media ==
"Oceans Under Glass," a segment of a 1995 episode of the PBS television series Return to the Sea, profiles the operations of the North Carolina Aquariums.
