= Atlantic Beach, North Carolina =

- Town
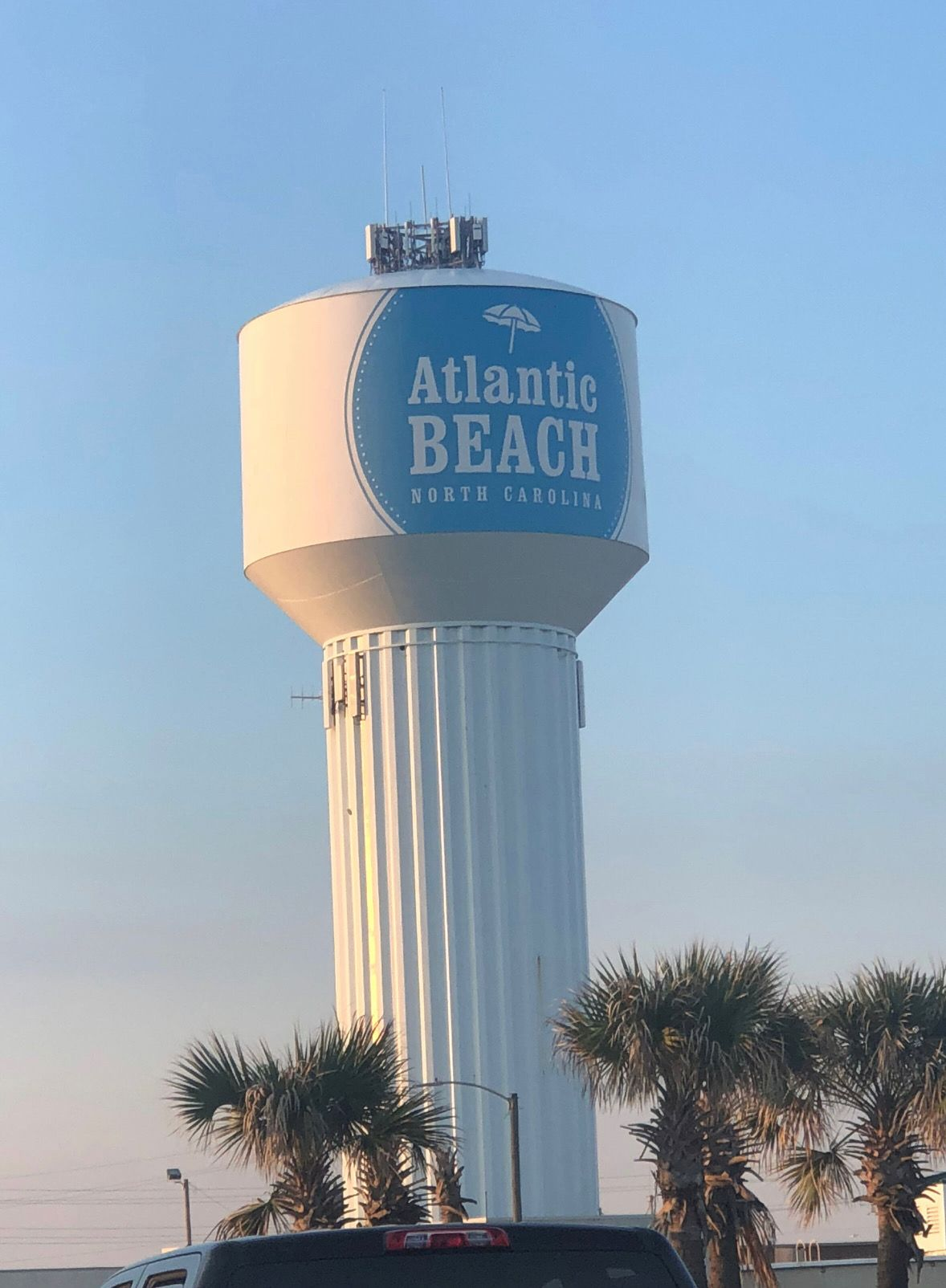
- The Atlantic Beach water tower

- Seal Logo
- Motto: "North Carolina's Crystal Coast"
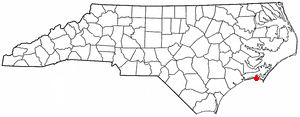
- Location of Atlantic Beach, North Carolina

- Location within North Carolina Location within the United States Location within North America
- Coordinates: 34°42′07″N 76°44′31″W
- Country: United States
- State: North Carolina
- County: Carteret

Area
  - Total: 2.76 sq mi (7.14 km^{2})
  - Land: 2.38 sq mi (6.17 km^{2})
  - Water: 0.37 sq mi (0.97 km^{2})
- Elevation: 7 ft (2.1 m)

Population (2020)
  - Total: 1,364
  - Density: 572.5/sq mi (221.05/km^{2})
- Time zone: UTC−5 (Eastern (EST))
  - Summer (DST): UTC−4 (EDT)
- ZIP code: 28512
- Area code: 252
- FIPS code: 37-02500
- GNIS feature ID: 2405180
- Website: www.atlanticbeach-nc.com

Atlantic Beach is a town in Carteret County, North Carolina, United States. It is one of the five communities located on Bogue Banks. The population was 1,364 at the 2020 census.

== History ==
The idea of Atlantic Beach was first envisioned in the 1870s by Appleton Oaksmith. However, construction did not begin until 1887. In 1928, a bridge was built, connecting Atlantic Beach to Morehead City.

Fort Macon and Queen Anne's Revenge are listed on the National Register of Historic Places.

The United States Coast Guard homeports several cutters in Atlantic Beach.

== Geography ==
Atlantic Beach is located on the eastern portion of Bogue Banks, a barrier island on the Atlantic coast. The town is bordered to the south by the Atlantic Ocean and to the north by Bogue Sound, which separates it from the mainland. To the east is Fort Macon State Park, occupying the eastern end of Bogue Banks and overlooking Beaufort Inlet, while to the west is the town of Pine Knoll Shores.

Atlantic Beach is connected to the mainland by the Atlantic Beach Causeway to Morehead City. North Carolina Highway 58 leads west from Atlantic Beach, running the length of Bogue Banks to Emerald Isle.

According to the United States Census Bureau, the town of Atlantic Beach has a total area of 2.7 square miles (6.9 km^{2}), of which 2.3 square miles (6.0 km^{2}) is land and 0.35 square miles (0.9 km^{2}), or 12.87%, is water.

== Climate ==
Atlantic Beach has a subtropical climate, like much of the Southeastern United States, characterized by short, relatively mild winters and long, hot, and humid summers. Daytime summer temperatures average around 89 °F (32 °C) and in winter, daytime temperatures average around 57 °F (14 °C). Summers in Atlantic Beach are cooler than a lot of cities within the southeastern region of the United States, primarily because of its close location to the ocean, and winters similarly see less extreme temperatures. The highest recorded temperature was 107 °F (42 °C) in 1952, and the lowest recorded temperature was 1 °F (−17 °C) in 1985. Rainfall is abundant throughout the year, with the wettest month being August, with an average total of 7.55 inches (192 millimeters).

Climate data for ATLANTIC BEACH WTP, NC, 1991-2020 normals
Month	Jan	Feb	Mar	Apr	May	Jun	Jul	Aug	Sep	Oct	Nov	Dec	Year
Mean daily maximum °F (°C)	53.7 (12.1)	54.6 (12.6)	60.8 (16.0)	68.1 (20.1)	76.3 (24.6)	82.5 (28.1)	86.2 (30.1)	85.8 (29.9)	82.5 (28.1)	74.3 (23.5)	65.1 (18.4)	57.1 (13.9)	70.6 (21.4)
Daily mean °F (°C)	46.2 (7.9)	47.4 (8.6)	53.5 (11.9)	61.7 (16.5)	70.1 (21.2)	77.4 (25.2)	81.0 (27.2)	80.3 (26.8)	76.5 (24.7)	67.3 (19.6)	57.7 (14.3)	49.8 (9.9)	64.1 (17.8)
Mean daily minimum °F (°C)	38.7 (3.7)	40.1 (4.5)	46.2 (7.9)	55.3 (12.9)	63.9 (17.7)	72.4 (22.4)	75.8 (24.3)	74.8 (23.8)	70.6 (21.4)	60.3 (15.7)	50.3 (10.2)	42.5 (5.8)	57.6 (14.2)
Mean minimum °F (°C)	22.1 (−5.5)	24.6 (−4.1)	30.7 (−0.7)	40.4 (4.7)	51.4 (10.8)	63.8 (17.7)	68.1 (20.1)	68.4 (20.2)	59.9 (15.5)	45.4 (7.4)	33.6 (0.9)	29.1 (−1.6)	19.5 (−6.9)
Average precipitation inches (mm)	4.23 (107)	3.70 (94)	3.35 (85)	3.99 (101)	4.50 (114)	3.91 (99)	5.72 (145)	7.10 (180)	9.65 (245)	4.20 (107)	3.94 (100)	4.68 (119)	58.97 (1,498)
Average precipitation days (≥ 0.01 in)	10.9	10.6	9.1	8.6	8.6	10.1	10.2	12.7	10.7	7.8	8.7	12.3	120.3
Source: NOAA

== Demographics ==
Historical population
Census	Pop.	Note	%±
1950	49		—
1960	76		55.1%
1970	300		294.7%
1980	941		213.7%
1990	1,938		106.0%
2000	1,781		−8.1%
2010	1,495		−16.1%
2020	1,364		−8.8%
U.S. Decennial Census

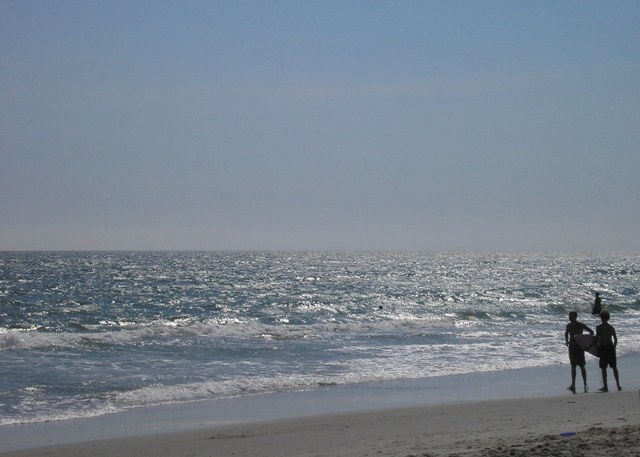
Atlantic Beach, summer 2006

=== 2020 census ===
Atlantic Beach racial composition
Race	Number	Percentage
White (non-Hispanic)	1,302	95.45%
Asian	2	0.15%
Other/Mixed	34	2.49%
Hispanic or Latino	26	1.91%

As of the 2020 United States census, there were 1,364 people, 934 households, and 447 families residing in the town.

=== 2008 ===
As of the census of 2008, there were 1,815 people, 971 households, and 498 families residing in the town. The population density was 831.0 inhabitants per square mile (320.9/km^{2}). There were 4,728 housing units at an average density of 2,206.0 per square mile (851.7/km^{2}). The racial makeup of the town was 98.03% White, 0.62% African American, 0.22% Native American, 0.73% Asian, 0.00% from other races, and 0.39% from two or more races. Hispanic or Latino of any race were 0.67% of the population.

There were 971 households, out of which 11.8% had children under the age of 18 living with them, 44.1% were married couples living together, 5.0% had a female householder with no husband present, and 48.7% were non-families. 39.6% of all households were made up of individuals, and 9.0% had someone living alone who was 65 years of age or older. The average household size was 1.82 and the average family size was 2.33.

In the town, the population was spread out, with 9.8% under the age of 18, 6.9% from 18 to 24, 26.3% from 25 to 44, 38.8% from 45 to 64, and 18.2% who were 65 years of age or older. The median age was 49 years. For every 100 females, there were 112.0 males. For every 100 females age 18 and over, there were 111.2 males.

The median income for a household in the town was $38,313, and the median income for a family was $52,411. Males had a median income of $32,045 versus $24,706 for females. The per capita income for the town was $31,339. 7.3% of the population and 5.3% of families were below the poverty line. Out of the total people living in poverty, 9.8% are under the age of 18 and 1.5% are 65 or older.

== Economy ==
Atlantic Beach is a popular destination for tourists and fishermen during the fall, spring and summer. Much of its economy is driven by restaurants, hotels and other attractions such as Fort Macon State Park.

Preceded by Fort Macon	Beaches of Southeastern North Carolina	Succeeded by Pine Knoll Shores
