= Pine Knoll Shores, North Carolina =

- Town
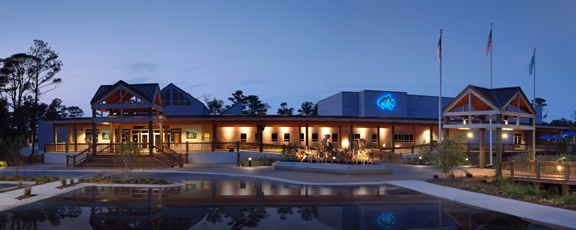
- The North Carolina Aquarium at Pine Knoll Shores

- Flag Seal

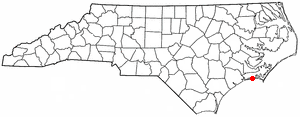
- Location of Pine Knoll Shores, North Carolina
- Coordinates: 34°41′49″N 76°49′24″W
- Country: United States
- State: North Carolina
- County: Carteret

Area
  - Total: 6.92 sq mi (17.91 km^{2})
  - Land: 2.21 sq mi (5.72 km^{2})
  - Water: 4.71 sq mi (12.19 km^{2})
- Elevation: 3 ft (0.91 m)

Population (2020)
  - Total: 1,388
  - Density: 628.4/sq mi (242.63/km^{2})
- Time zone: UTC-5 (Eastern (EST))
  - Summer (DST): UTC-4 (EDT)
- ZIP code: 28512
- Area code: 252
- FIPS code: 37-52000
- GNIS feature ID: 2407116
- Website: www.townofpks.com

Pine Knoll Shores is a coastal town in Carteret County, North Carolina, United States. The population was 1,388 at the 2020 census. One of North Carolina's state aquariums is located here.

== Geography ==
Pine Knoll Shores is located in southwestern Carteret County on Bogue Banks, a barrier island along the Atlantic Ocean. It is bordered to the west by the town of Indian Beach and to the east by the town of Atlantic Beach. To the north is Bogue Sound, and to the south is the Atlantic Ocean.

North Carolina Highway 58 passes through the town, traveling the length of Bogue Banks. To the east, NC 58 connects with a bridge to Morehead City on the mainland, and to the west, NC 58 crosses Bogue Sound from Emerald Isle to Cape Carteret on the mainland.

According to the United States Census Bureau, Pine Knoll Shores has a total area of 2.5 square miles (6.6 km^{2}), of which 2.2 square miles (5.8 km^{2}) is land and 0.31 square miles (0.8 km^{2}), or 12.54%, is water.

== Demographics ==
Historical population
Census	Pop.	Note	%±
1980	646		—
1990	1,360		110.5%
2000	1,524		12.1%
2010	1,339		−12.1%
2020	1,388		3.7%
U.S. Decennial Census

Fish sculpture outside the North Carolina Aquarium at Pine Knoll Shores

=== 2020 census ===
Pine Knoll Shores racial composition
Race	Number	Percentage
White (non-Hispanic)	1,334	96.11%
Black or African American (non-Hispanic)	2	0.14%
Native American	2	0.14%
Asian	8	0.58%
Other/Mixed	26	1.87%
Hispanic or Latino	16	1.15%

As of the 2020 United States census, there were 1,388 people, 663 households, and 453 families residing in the town.

=== 2008 ===
As of the census of 2008, there were 1,547 people, 776 households, and 557 families residing in the town. The population density was 668.9 inhabitants per square mile (258.3/km^{2}). There were 2,049 housing units at an average density of 899.4 per square mile (347.3/km^{2}). The racial makeup of the town was 99.15% White, 0.07% African American, 0.13% Native American, 0.13% Asian, 0.07% Pacific Islander, 0.07% from other races, and 0.39% from two or more races. Hispanic or Latino of any race were 1.05% of the population.

There were 776 households, out of which 7.9% had children under the age of 18 living with them, 68.8% were married couples living together, 2.2% had a female householder with no husband present, and 28.1% were non-families. 24.9% of all households were made up of individuals, and 14.6% had someone living alone who was 65 years of age or older. The average household size was 1.96 and the average family size was 2.27.

In the town, the population was spread out, with 7.5% under the age of 18, 2.2% from 18 to 24, 11.2% from 25 to 44, 36.4% from 45 to 64, and 42.7% who were 65 years of age or older. The median age was 62 years. For every 100 females, there were 90.7 males. For every 100 females age 18 and over, there were 91.8 males.

The median income for a household in the town was $53,800, and the median income for a family was $60,662. Males had a median income of $42,417 versus $27,321 for females. The per capita income for the town was $34,618. About 1.8% of families and 3.6% of the population were below the poverty line, including 4.2% of those under age 18 and 2.1% of those age 65 or over.

== North Carolina Aquarium ==
The North Carolina Aquarium at Pine Knoll Shores is located in Pine Knoll Shores.

Preceded by Atlantic Beach	Beaches of Southeastern North Carolina	Succeeded by Salter Path
