= Emerald Isle, North Carolina =

- Town
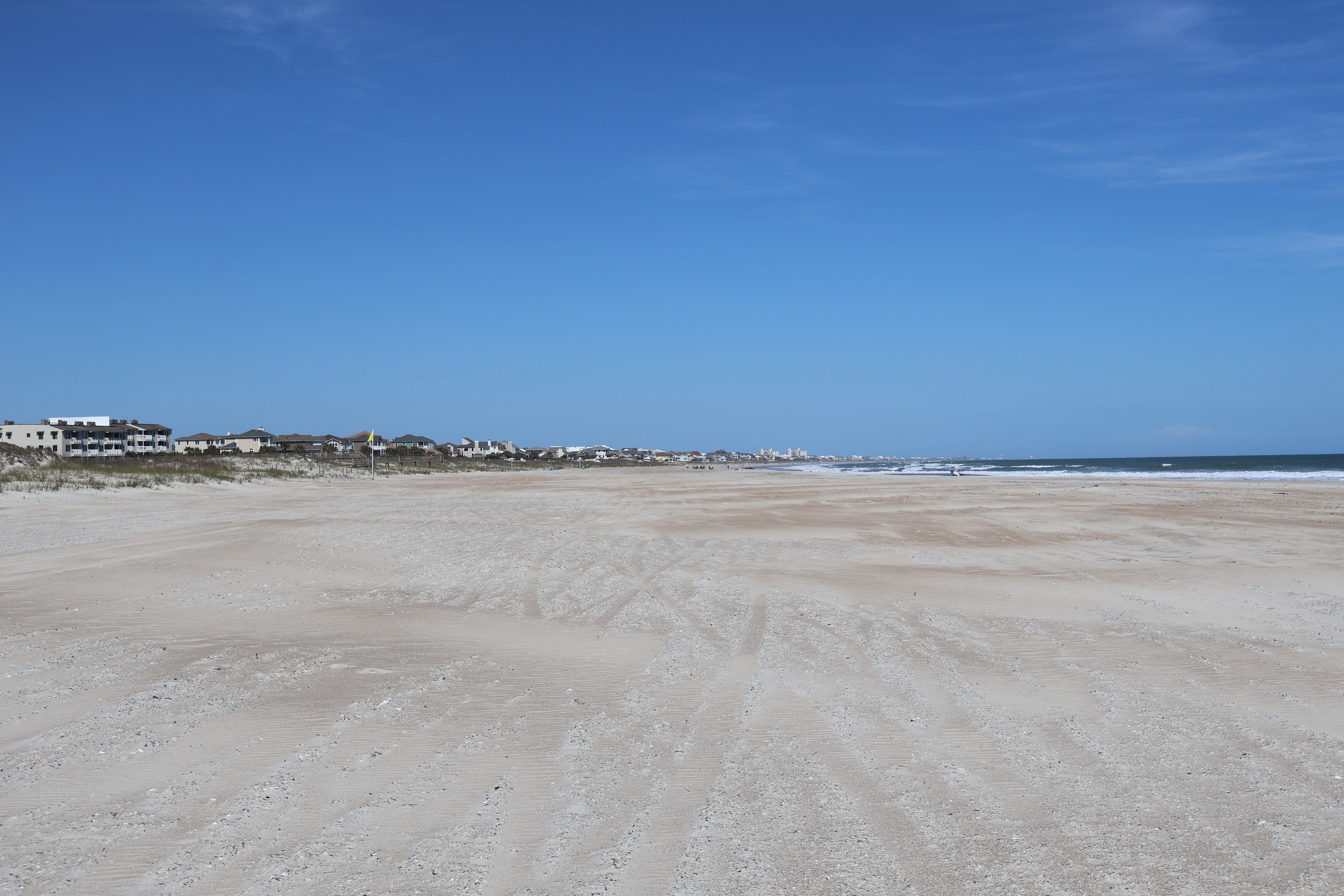
- Emerald Isle shoreline

- Flag Seal
- Motto: Nice Matters!
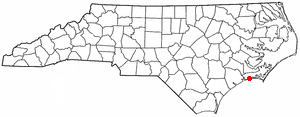
- Location of Emerald Isle, North Carolina
- Coordinates: 34°39′53″N 77°01′52″W
- Country: United States
- State: North Carolina
- County: Carteret

Area
  - Total: 5.01 sq mi (12.98 km^{2})
  - Land: 4.92 sq mi (12.75 km^{2})
  - Water: 0.089 sq mi (0.23 km^{2})
- Elevation: 16 ft (4.9 m)

Population (2020)
  - Total: 3,847
  - Density: 781/sq mi (301.7/km^{2})
- Time zone: UTC-5 (EST)
  - Summer (DST): UTC-4 (EDT)
- ZIP code: 28594
- Area code: 252
- FIPS code: 37-21160
- GNIS feature ID: 2406448
- Website: www.emeraldisle-nc.org

Emerald Isle is a town in Carteret County, North Carolina, United States. It is part of the Crystal Coast and is located entirely on Bogue Banks. The population was 3,847 at the 2020 census.

Today, the oceanfront is lined with large and small homes, duplexes, condominiums, and one oceanfront hotel. Emerald Isle has a family-oriented atmosphere.

Recent beach renourishment projects in North Carolina, including Emerald Isle, have been both praised and questioned.

== History ==
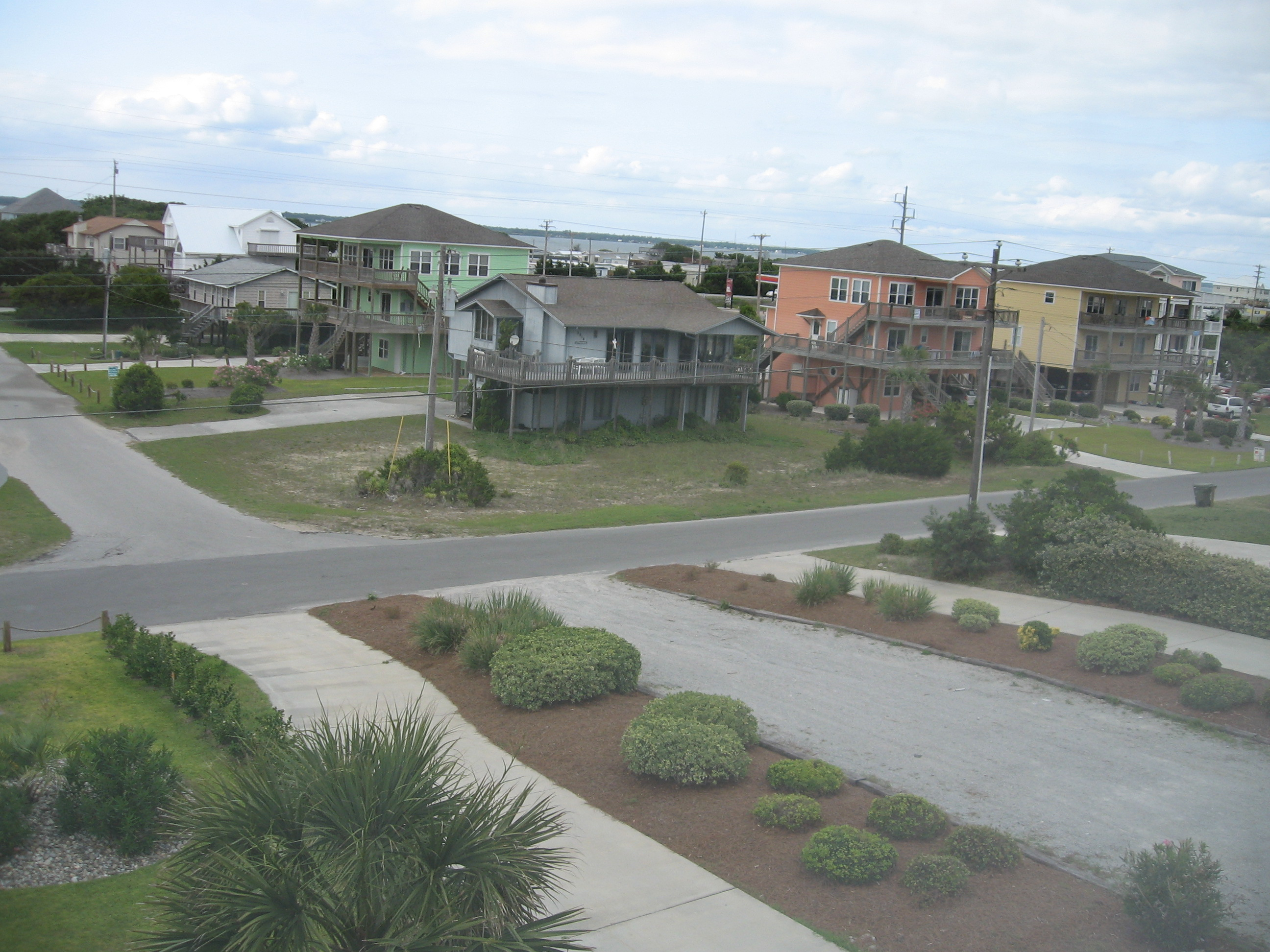
View of an Emerald Isle neighborhood.

From about 1 AD to colonial times, Emerald Isle was home to Native Americans. Later, the area was settled by a small number of whalers and fishermen.

In the 1920s, Henry Fort, who owned the Emerald Isle beaches and land surrounding them, hoped to open a large summer tourist attraction and ocean resort. Fort worked with developers, but the plans never materialized. After his death, his daughter Anita Maulick inherited Emerald Isle.

In 1951, seven people purchased the 12-mile (19 km) stretch of island for $350,000 from Anita Maulick. Emerald Isle was sliced into 54 blocks of 1,000 feet (300 m), each going from ocean to sound. The partners drew from a hat for the ownership of blocks. Because they wanted Emerald Isle to be family-oriented, the owners limited commercial development and mobile homes to five blocks each.

In 1960, ferry service began, providing wider access to the Bogue Banks beaches of modern-day Emerald Isle.

In 1971, the Cameron Langston Bridge was opened to provide access from Cedar Point to the western end of Bogue Banks and Emerald Isle. The bridge, spanning the Intracoastal Waterway, offers a great view of Bogue Sound and Bogue Banks. The opening of the bridge increased island development.

Emerald Isle is a popular vacation spot for families and is also known for excellent fishing and a wealth of marine life. Its beaches are a favorite location for nesting sea turtles, which are protected by federal law.

== Geography ==
Emerald Isle is located in southwestern Carteret County at the western end of Bogue Banks, a barrier island. To the south is the Atlantic Ocean, and to the north is Bogue Sound separating the island from mainland North Carolina. The town extends to the western tip of the island, ending at Bogue Inlet, while to the east the town is bordered by Indian Beach. NC Highway 58 runs through the town, connecting it with the mainland in Cape Carteret.

According to the United States Census Bureau, the town has a total area of 5.1 square miles (13.1 km^{2}), of which 5.0 square miles (12.9 km^{2}) is land and 0.08 square miles (0.2 km^{2}), or 1.67%, is water.

== Climate ==
The climate in this area is characterized by hot, humid summers and generally mild to cool winters. According to the Köppen Climate Classification system, Emerald Isle has a humid subtropical climate, abbreviated "Cfa" on climate maps. It has a USDA hardiness zone of 8b.

Climate data for Emerald Isle
Month	Jan	Feb	Mar	Apr	May	Jun	Jul	Aug	Sep	Oct	Nov	Dec	Year
Mean daily maximum °F (°C)	54.3 (12.4)	56.2 (13.4)	62.1 (16.7)	69.6 (20.9)	76.6 (24.8)	82.9 (28.3)	86.1 (30.1)	85.4 (29.7)	81.7 (27.6)	74.0 (23.3)	64.7 (18.2)	57.9 (14.4)	71.0 (21.7)
Mean daily minimum °F (°C)	37.1 (2.8)	38.9 (3.8)	44.7 (7.1)	53.5 (11.9)	62.2 (16.8)	70.4 (21.3)	74.2 (23.4)	72.9 (22.7)	68.5 (20.3)	57.8 (14.3)	47.0 (8.3)	40.8 (4.9)	55.7 (13.2)
Average precipitation inches (mm)	4.36 (111)	3.76 (96)	3.67 (93)	3.61 (92)	4.35 (110)	4.92 (125)	6.34 (161)	7.46 (189)	8.14 (207)	4.95 (126)	4.27 (108)	4.25 (108)	60.09 (1,526)
Source: PRISM

== Demographics ==
Historical population
Census	Pop.	Note	%±
1960	14		—
1970	122		771.4%
1980	865		609.0%
1990	2,434		181.4%
2000	3,488		43.3%
2010	3,655		4.8%
2020	3,847		5.3%
U.S. Decennial Census

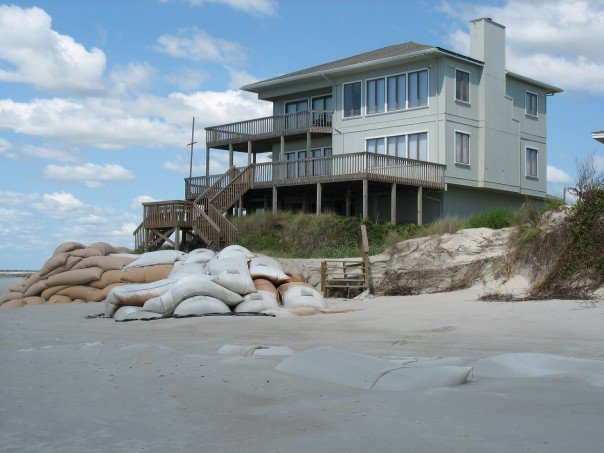
The beach has partially eroded at the western end of Emerald Isle.

=== 2020 census ===
As of the 2020 census, Emerald Isle had a population of 3,847. The median age was 58.4 years. 12.0% of residents were under the age of 18 and 34.4% of residents were 65 years of age or older. For every 100 females there were 92.9 males, and for every 100 females age 18 and over there were 89.8 males age 18 and over.

100.0% of residents lived in urban areas, while 0.0% lived in rural areas.

There were 1,862 households in Emerald Isle, and 1,188 families resided in the town. Of all households, 14.9% had children under the age of 18 living in them. Of all households, 55.3% were married-couple households, 15.9% were households with a male householder and no spouse or partner present, and 24.0% were households with a female householder and no spouse or partner present. About 30.1% of all households were made up of individuals and 15.1% had someone living alone who was 65 years of age or older.

There were 6,769 housing units, of which 72.5% were vacant. The homeowner vacancy rate was 1.8% and the rental vacancy rate was 27.1%.

Racial composition as of the 2020 census
Race	Number	Percent
White	3,571	92.8%
Black or African American	13	0.3%
American Indian and Alaska Native	8	0.2%
Asian	26	0.7%
Native Hawaiian and Other Pacific Islander	2	0.1%
Some other race	38	1.0%
Two or more races	189	4.9%
Hispanic or Latino (of any race)	122	3.2%

=== 2000 census ===
As of the census of 2000, there were 3,488 people, 1,644 households, and 1,088 families residing in the town. The population density was 665.3 inhabitants per square mile (256.9/km^{2}). There were 6,017 housing units at an average density of 1,147.8 per square mile (443.2/km^{2}). The racial makeup of the town was 96.67% White, 0.80% African American, 0.46% Native American, 0.63% Asian, 0.03% Pacific Islander, 0.29% from other races, and 1.12% from two or more races. Hispanic or Latino of any race were 1.63% of the population.

There were 1,644 households, out of which 16.0% had children under the age of 18 living with them, 60.6% were married couples living together, 4.0% had a female householder with no male present, and 33.8% were non-families. 26.0% of all households were made up of individuals, and 8.6% had someone living alone who was 65 years of age or older. The average household size was 2.12 and the average family size was 2.49.

In the town, the population was spread out, with 13.1% under the age of 18, 4.8% from 18 to 24, 24.0% from 25 to 44, 35.7% from 45 to 64, and 22.4% who were 65 years of age or older. The median age was 50 years. For every 100 females, there were 105.5 males. For every 100 females age 18 and over, there were 105.8 males.

The median income for a household in the town was $84,457, and the median income for a family was $60,257. Males had a median income of $53,365 versus $28,4875 for females. The per capita income for the town was $31,316. About 2.1% of families and 2.7% of the population were below the poverty line, including none of those under age 18 and 5.0% of those age 65 or over.

Preceded by Indian Beach	Beaches of Southeastern North Carolina	Succeeded by Hammocks Beach
