= Salter Path, North Carolina =

Unincorporated community in the United States

- Unincorporated community
- Location within North Carolina Location within the United States
- Coordinates: 34°41′19″N 76°53′10″W
- Country: United States
- State: North Carolina
- County: Carteret
- Elevation: 10 ft (3.0 m)
- Time zone: UTC-5 (Eastern (EST))
  - Summer (DST): UTC-4 (EDT)
- ZIP code: 28575
- Area code: 252
- GNIS feature ID: 1027455

Salter Path is an unincorporated community in Carteret County, North Carolina, United States. A Crystal Coast community, it lies on Bogue Banks as an enclave within Indian Beach.

== History ==
The decline in the whaling industry in the mid-to-late 19th century and good fishing on Bogue Banks caused many settlers, mostly near Cape Lookout (Diamond City), to move toward the middle and western reaches of Bogue Banks. Many of the families who moved to Salter Path in the late 19th century and early 20th century established their residences without deeds before Bostonian John A. Royall purchased Salter Path. The area of Salter Path subsequently became known as a squatter's community.

Salter Path was passed from John A. Royall to Alice Green Hoffman, a distant relative of Theodore Roosevelt and daughter of Albert W. Green of Green-Joyce Company. Alice Hoffman developed an estate in present-day Pine Knoll Shores and sued the residents of Salter Path in 1923 because their cows were wandering onto her estate.

A subsequent court decision permitted the residents of Salter Path to remain, but the cows were not allowed to graze on the Hoffman Estate. The village was restricted to 81 acres (330,000 m^{2}) that the squatters occupied, and direct ownership of the beachfront was granted to the village to use collectively. This ruling further stated that only current residents and descendants could occupy the property, but it did not give any individuals title to the land. This ruling remained intact until 1979 when a legal settlement permitted Salter Path residents to hold a title to their property and for Carteret County to levy taxes on the former squatter's village.

Recent studies, provided by the Duke Institute of Marine Sciences (located in Beaufort, NC) have shown that Salter Path was a frequent refuge for the notorious pirate, Blackbeard.

== Toponymy ==
The community of Salter Path is believed to be named after Owen Salter or possibly Riley Salter, although Riley Salter's true whereabouts during the 1880s have been questioned by historians and native Bogue Bankers. Schools of mullet fish that ran close to the ocean shorelines were the prime catch for many of the natives. These fishermen would quickly mobilize from the sound to the ocean, wearing a path in front of a Salter household, hence the name Salter Path.

Alternatively, in the 1800s the word "salter", in common usage, meant a one-way deer gate, used for centuries to control deer populations. Inserted in a fence completely spanning a narrow point in the island, it would tend to sequester deer to one end, away from farms and crops. The narrowest point on the island is, in fact, the village of Salter Path. There is the possibility it is named for the path that would inevitably lead to the salter, the only passage through the fence. Historian and toponymist Mary C. Higham provides evidence that such places as Salter Street, London, Saltley, Salterford, and even Salt Hill, UK derive their names from these salters, rather than salt or the surname Salter.

Preceded by Pine Knoll Shores	Beaches of Southeastern North Carolina	Succeeded by Indian Beach
