= Indian Beach, North Carolina =

- Town
- Seal

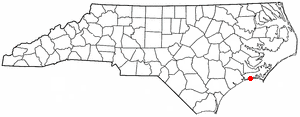
- Location of Indian Beach, North Carolina
- Coordinates: 34°41′12″N 76°53′54″W
- Country: United States
- State: North Carolina
- County: Carteret

Area
  - Total: 0.59 sq mi (1.53 km^{2})
  - Land: 0.57 sq mi (1.47 km^{2})
  - Water: 0.023 sq mi (0.06 km^{2})
- Elevation: 10 ft (3.0 m)

Population (2020)
  - Total: 223
  - Density: 392/sq mi (151.2/km^{2})
- Time zone: UTC-5 (Eastern (EST))
  - Summer (DST): UTC-4 (EDT)
- ZIP code: 28512
- Area code: 252
- FIPS code: 37-33460
- GNIS feature ID: 2405884
- Website: www.indianbeach.org

Indian Beach is a town in Carteret County, North Carolina, United States. The population was 223 as of the 2020 census.

== Geography ==
Indian Beach is located in southern Carteret County on Bogue Banks, a barrier island along the Atlantic Ocean. It is bordered to the west by the town of Emerald Isle and to the east by Pine Knoll Shores. To the north is Bogue Sound, separating the town from the mainland, and to the south is the Atlantic. The town consists of two sections, separated by the unincorporated neighborhood of Salter Path. The only main road through the community is NC Highway 58.

According to the United States Census Bureau, the town of Indian Beach has a total area of 1.5 square miles (3.8 km^{2}), of which 0.58 square miles (1.5 km^{2}) is land and 0.93 square miles (2.4 km^{2}), or 62.05%, is water, consisting of portions of Bogue Sound.

== Demographics ==
Historical population
Census	Pop.	Note	%±
1980	54		—
1990	153		183.3%
2000	95		−37.9%
2010	112		17.9%
2020	223		99.1%
U.S. Decennial Census

At the 2000 census there were 95 people, 50 households, and 31 families in the town. The population density was 159.9 inhabitants per square mile (61.7/km^{2}). There were 1,218 housing units at an average density of 2,049.9 per square mile (791.5/km^{2}). The racial makeup of the town was 95.79% White, 3.16% Pacific Islander, and 1.05% from two or more races. Hispanic or Latino of any race were 2.11%.

Of the 50 households 14.0% had children under the age of 18 living with them, 54.0% were married couples living together, 4.0% had a female householder with no husband present, and 38.0% were non-families. 34.0% of households were one person and 10.0% were one person aged 65 or older. The average household size was 1.90 and the average family size was 2.35.

The age distribution was 10.5% under the age of 18, 2.1% from 18 to 24, 20.0% from 25 to 44, 31.6% from 45 to 64, and 35.8% 65 or older. The median age was 59 years. For every 100 females, there were 97.9 males. For every 100 females age 18 and over, there were 97.7 males.

The median household income was $47,250 and the median family income was $45,250. Males had a median income of $49,583 versus $37,500 for females. The per capita income for the town was $25,826. There were 6.5% of families and 5.0% of the population living below the poverty line, including no under eighteens and none of those over 64.

Preceded by Salter Path	Beaches of Southeastern North Carolina	Succeeded by Emerald Isle
