= Cape Carteret, North Carolina =

- Town
- Seal
- Motto: "Working & Growing Together"
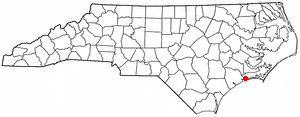
- Location of Cape Carteret, North Carolina
- Coordinates: 34°41′50″N 77°03′26″W
- Country: United States
- State: North Carolina
- County: Carteret

Area
  - Total: 2.61 sq mi (6.77 km^{2})
  - Land: 2.53 sq mi (6.54 km^{2})
  - Water: 0.089 sq mi (0.23 km^{2})
- Elevation: 16 ft (4.9 m)

Population (2020)
  - Total: 2,224
  - Density: 881.3/sq mi (340.27/km^{2})
- Time zone: UTC-5 (Eastern (EST))
  - Summer (DST): UTC-4 (EDT)
- FIPS code: 37-10260
- GNIS feature ID: 2405376
- Website: www.townofcapecarteret.org

Cape Carteret is a town in Carteret County, on the southern coast of North Carolina, United States. It was incorporated in 1959 and had a population of 2,224 as of the 2020 census.

== Geography ==
Cape Carteret is located in western Carteret County. It is bordered to the north by Pettiford Creek and the Croatan National Forest; to the east by Bogue, and to the west by Cedar Point. To the south is Bogue Sound, with the town of Emerald Isle on the opposite shore, connected to Cape Carteret by the B. Cameron Langston Bridge carrying North Carolina Highway 58. NC 58 leads north 15 miles (24 km) to U.S. Route 17 at Maysville. North Carolina Highway 24 leads east 20 miles (32 km) to Morehead City and west 22 miles (35 km) to Jacksonville.

According to the United States Census Bureau, the town of Cape Carteret has a total area of 2.7 square miles (6.9 km^{2}), of which 2.5 square miles (6.4 km^{2}) is land and 0.19 square miles (0.5 km^{2}), or 7.04%, is water.

== Demographics ==
Historical population
Census	Pop.	Note	%±
1960	52		—
1970	616		1,084.6%
1980	944		53.2%
1990	1,008		6.8%
2000	1,214		20.4%
2010	1,917		57.9%
2020	2,224		16.0%
U.S. Decennial Census

=== 2020 census ===
As of the 2020 census, Cape Carteret had a population of 2,224. The median age was 50.2 years. 19.6% of residents were under the age of 18 and 29.0% of residents were 65 years of age or older. For every 100 females there were 98.2 males, and for every 100 females age 18 and over there were 93.1 males age 18 and over.

99.6% of residents lived in urban areas, while 0.4% lived in rural areas.

There were 920 households in Cape Carteret, including 695 families, of which 28.5% had children under the age of 18 living in them. Of all households, 62.0% were married-couple households, 11.0% were households with a male householder and no spouse or partner present, and 22.1% were households with a female householder and no spouse or partner present. About 23.2% of all households were made up of individuals and 16.1% had someone living alone who was 65 years of age or older.

There were 1,142 housing units, of which 19.4% were vacant. The homeowner vacancy rate was 1.8% and the rental vacancy rate was 5.1%.

Cape Carteret racial composition
Race	Number	Percentage
White (non-Hispanic)	1,985	89.25%
Black or African American (non-Hispanic)	26	1.17%
Native American	2	0.09%
Asian	33	1.48%
Pacific Islander	1	0.04%
Other/Mixed	88	3.96%
Hispanic or Latino	89	4.0%

=== 2000 census ===
As of the census of 2000, there were 1,214 people, 545 households, and 415 families residing in the town. The population density was 511.5 inhabitants per square mile (197.5/km^{2}). There were 711 housing units at an average density of 299.6 per square mile (115.7/km^{2}). The racial makeup of the town was 98.11% White, 0.33% African American, 0.16% Native American, 0.58% Asian, 0.08% Pacific Islander, 0.16% from other races, and 0.58% from two or more races. Hispanic or Latino of any race were 1.40% of the population.

There were 545 households, out of which 17.2% had children under the age of 18 living with them, 69.5% were married couples living together, 5.3% had a female householder with no husband present, and 23.7% were non-families. 21.1% of all households were made up of individuals, and 13.6% had someone living alone who was 65 years of age or older. The average household size was 2.23 and the average family size was 2.51.

In the town, the population was spread out, with 14.7% under the age of 18, 3.7% from 18 to 24, 18.5% from 25 to 44, 29.7% from 45 to 64, and 33.4% who were 65 years of age or older. The median age was 54 years. For every 100 females, there were 96.1 males. For every 100 females age 18 and over, there were 93.3 males.

The median income for a household in the town was $44,514, and the median income for a family was $49,722. Males had a median income of $30,542 versus $25,000 for females. The per capita income for the town was $26,806. About 2.6% of families and 5.0% of the population were below the poverty line, including 12.6% of those under age 18 and 3.1% of those age 65 or over.
