= List of United States tornadoes from November to December 2013 =

This is a list of all tornadoes that were confirmed by local offices of the National Weather Service in the United States from November to December 2013. Based on the 1991–2010 averaging period, 58 tornadoes occur across the United States throughout November while 24 more occur in December.

Despite only having only four tornado days, November finished well-above average with 82 tornadoes, 77 of which touched down during a large and deadly outbreak on November 17. The outbreak was the deadliest and costliest November tornado outbreak in Illinois, and the fourth-largest for the state overall. Indiana also experienced its largest outbreak for the month of November, and the second largest outbreak recorded in the state. A significant outbreak also occurred in December, which finished at a near-average 18 tornadoes.

== November ==
Confirmed tornadoes by Enhanced Fujita rating
EFU	EF0	EF1	EF2	EF3	EF4	EF5	Total
0	16	32	25	7	2	0	82

=== November 1 event ===
List of confirmed tornadoes – Friday, November 1, 2013 (Note: All dates are based on the local time zone where the tornado touched down; however, all times are in Coordinated Universal Time for consistency.)
EF#	Location	County / Parish	State	Start Coord.	Time (UTC)	Path length	Max width	Summary
EF1	NW of Hebron	Licking	OH	39.9704°N 82.5295°W	0507 – 0508	1.28 mi (2.06 km)	50 yd (46 m)	Near the beginning of the path, numerous pine trees that were 12 to 18 inches (30 to 46 cm) in diameter, a large cottonwood tree, and several smaller maple trees were snapped. Several tree branches landed on roofs, and a garage sustained siding damage. The tornado moved east-northeast, downing several more trees before dissipating.

=== November 4 event ===
List of confirmed tornadoes – Monday, November 4, 2013
EF#	Location	County / Parish	State	Start Coord.	Time (UTC)	Path length	Max width	Summary
EF0	S of Bigfork	Flathead	MT	47.97°N 114.07°W	1442 – 1446	0.75 mi (1.21 km)	200 yd (180 m)	A brief multiple-vortex tornado over Flathead Lake caused no damage.

=== November 17 event ===
List of confirmed tornadoes – Sunday, November 17, 2013
EF#	Location	County / Parish	State	Start Coord.	Time (UTC)	Path length	Max width	Summary
EF2	Pekin	Peoria, Tazewell	IL	40.5756°N 89.6569°W	1652 – 1654	2.26 mi (3.64 km)	100 yd (91 m)	Approximately 179 houses and 6 businesses suffered major damage (including some that lost their roofs), while 182 houses experienced minor roof damage. In addition, 3 apartment buildings lost their roofs, a power substation had minor damage, and hundreds of cars were damaged. Many trees and power lines were downed as well. 10 people were injured. This tornado was a precursor to the EF4 Washington tornado.
EF4	SE of East Peoria to Washington to E of Long Point	Tazewell, Woodford, LaSalle, Livingston	IL	40.622°N 89.5678°W	1659 – 1747	46.36 mi (74.61 km)	880 yd (800 m)	3 deaths – See article on this tornado
EF0	NW of Litchfield	Macoupin, Montgomery	IL	39.2346°N 89.7255°W	1730 – 1734	3.98 mi (6.41 km)	50 yd (46 m)	There was photographic evidence of a large tornado; however, the tornado occurred over open fields, causing only minor damage to power poles, some trees, and a barn.
EF0	E of Dana to SSE of Long Point	Livingston	IL	40.9587°N 88.9251°W	1743 – 1746	2.6 mi (4.2 km)	50 yd (46 m)	Satellite tornado to the EF4 East Peoria/Washington tornado was caught on camera but caused no damage.
EF1	NNE of Breese	Clinton	IL	38.7099°N 89.5175°W	1747 – 1748	0.37 mi (0.60 km)	50 yd (46 m)	Brief tornado destroyed a garage and pole barn, removed shingles from a house, and snapped several trees.
EF4	SW of New Minden to NNE of Hoyleton	Washington	IL	38.42°N 89.45°W	1804 – 1813	10.59 mi (17.04 km)	200 yd (180 m)	2 deaths – See section on this tornado
EF1	NE of Hoyleton to SW of Centralia	Washington, Clinton	IL	38.48°N 89.245°W	1813 – 1818	4.76 mi (7.66 km)	100 yd (91 m)	Tornado formed immediately after the EF4 New Minden tornado had dissipated to the west. Multiple barns and outbuildings were either damaged or destroyed, a house sustained roof and chimney damage, a garage and a carport were damaged, a clubhouse at a ranch sustained major roof, siding, and window damage, and several trees were downed.
EF1	Northern Pana	Christian	IL	39.3968°N 89.0791°W	1815 – 1818	2.52 mi (4.06 km)	100 yd (91 m)	Tornado touched down on the north side of Pana, where several homes suffered roof and siding damage. Trees were blown down, damaging 3 cars. Power poles were also downed. As the tornado traveled north-northeast out of town, it damaged a home, destroyed an outbuilding, and downed trees and power lines before dissipating.
EF2	SW of St. Elmo to SSW of Altamont	Fayette, Effingham	IL	38.9965°N 88.9290°W	1822 – 1832	11.4 mi (18.3 km)	200 yd (180 m)	Tornado touched down southwest of St. Elmo, destroying a pole barn and scattering debris. It tracked northeast, damaging silos and either damaging or destroying numerous outbuildings. Three homes suffered significant damage, with two of the homes being moved off of their foundations. The tornado then destroyed a garage and two outbuildings and damaged several more outbuildings before moving into Effingham County and dissipating. Many trees were downed along the path.
EF2	SSW of Coal City to NNE of Wilmington	Grundy, Will	IL	41.2372°N 88.3033°W	1822 – 1833	12.02 mi (19.34 km)	200 yd (180 m)	Worst damage occurred in the Coal City/Diamond area. Many homes suffered varying degrees of damage, ranging from minor exterior damage to partial roof and wall loss. Several businesses were damaged, along with numerous RVs and other vehicles. A two-story structure lost its roof and had portions of its walls ripped off. A model home was completely removed from its foundation on the north side of State Route 113. A manufactured building had its roof ripped off with all the walls collapsed. Several metal buildings were damaged and numerous trees and power lines were downed as well before the tornado dissipated. Five people were injured. This tornado formed from the same supercell that produced the Pekin and East Peoria/Washington tornadoes and it would go on to produce the Manhattan/Frankfort tornado.
EF1	ENE of West Liberty	Jasper	IL	38.8547°N 88.0877°W	1825 – 1829	3.53 mi (5.68 km)	100 yd (91 m)	Several homes suffered mainly roof and siding damage, but an older home lost its entire roof and had a collapse of two exterior walls. A semi trailer was turned over, at least four power poles were downed, and roofs were blown off of several barns, with at least one barn being destroyed. Numerous trees were downed along the path.
EF0	SW of Frohna	Perry	MO	37.6095°N 89.6558°W	1826 – 1827	0.1 mi (0.16 km)	50 yd (46 m)	Very brief tornado downed several trees.
EF1	NE of Williamsburg to Garrett	Moultrie, Douglas	IL	39.7499°N 88.5981°W	1830 – 1841	10.54 mi (16.96 km)	440 yd (400 m)	In Moultrie County, major roof damage occurred to 8 homes, while 1 garage was destroyed and 17 outbuildings were severely damaged. Numerous trees and power poles were damaged as well. In Douglas County, the tornado damaged the roofs of 3 homes and 5 outbuildings, as well as numerous trees and power poles. Before dissipating, the tornado struck the town of Garrett, where the roofs of about two dozen homes and mobile homes were damaged.
EF2	SE of Manhattan to SSW of Frankfort	Will	IL	41.4093°N 87.9312°W	1842 – 1848	5.21 mi (8.38 km)	200 yd (180 m)	Several homes were damaged, five of which were subsequently deemed uninhabitable, along with several other structures, including two barns. Four high-tension power line towers were bent, and several other power lines and trees were downed. This tornado formed from the same supercell that produced the Pekin, East Peoria/Washington, and Coal City tornadoes.
EF3	NW of Tuscola to NNW of Broadlands	Douglas, Champaign	IL	39.8413°N 88.3291°W	1844 – 1902	18.74 mi (30.16 km)	440 yd (400 m)	Tornado crossed Interstate 57, damaging multiple farms along the path. Numerous trees and power poles were downed, and a mobile home was destroyed with the undercarriage twisted. A large brick home had its entire second story ripped off, and multiple garages and outbuildings were destroyed. Several vehicles were damaged and tossed as well. This tornado absorbed the weaker Tuscola/Villa Grove tornado, which formed at 1845 UTC, while the two tornadoes were northeast of Villa Grove.
EF3	E of Thomasboro to SW of Wellington	Champaign, Vermilion, Iroquois	IL	40.2351°N 88.1663°W	1845 – 1915	29.83 mi (48.01 km)	880 yd (800 m)	A large tornado struck Gifford, where nearly 30 homes were destroyed, more than 40 suffered major damage, and around 125 had minor damage. Around 15 businesses sustained moderate to major damage and the roof of a school was peeled back. Hundreds of vehicles were damaged or destroyed as well. Some of the homes in Gifford were pushed off of their foundations, and many trees and power lines were downed as well. Tornado left cycloidal marks in farm fields outside of town, and damaged or destroyed several rural homes and farms. One unanchored home at a farm was leveled, and cinder blocks were found impaled into the side of a nearby truck. In Iroquois County, the tornado was only at EF0 strength, causing damage to outbuildings and downing trees. Six people suffered minor injuries. This was the first tornado to hit Iroquois County in November since reliable records began in 1950.
EF1	NNE of Tuscola to NW of Villa Grove	Douglas	IL	39.8326°N 88.2655°W	1846 – 1851	4.51 mi (7.26 km)	440 yd (400 m)	Tornado crossed Interstate 57, caused minor damage to two homes, and destroyed several outbuildings. The storm eventually merged with the more powerful EF3 Villa Grove/Broadlands tornado to the northwest of Villa Grove.
EF1	SE of Beecher	Kankakee, Will	IL	41.2973°N 87.5461°W	1900 – 1902	0.16 mi (0.26 km)	150 yd (140 m)	A large barn sustained significant roof and wall damage and two metal buildings lost part of their roofs, with debris being tossed almost 1,000 yards (910 m). A tractor blade weighing about 400 pounds (180 kg) was thrown 60 feet (18 m), a grain pipe was ripped from a silo and mangled, and several trees were downed.
EF2	NE of Allerton to NE of Westville	Vermilion	IL	39.9445°N 87.9026°W	1903 – 1923	19.68 mi (31.67 km)	440 yd (400 m)	Near Allerton, the tornado did major damage to 2 homes, caused roof damage to 4 other homes, and destroyed 9 outbuildings, 4 garages, and 2 grain bins. Numerous trees and power poles were also snapped. The tornado then passed north of Westville and impacted the villages of Hegeler and Belgium, where 9 homes sustained major damage, 26 had significant roof damage, and more than 100 had minor roof damage. The tornado also damaged more than 50 mobile homes, numerous garages and vehicles, and destroyed about 25 outbuildings in that area. One person was injured in the Hegeler/Belgium area before the tornado dissipated.
EF1	NE of Opdyke	Jefferson	IL	38.2779°N 88.7577°W	1905 – 1906	0.15 mi (0.24 km)	25 yd (23 m)	Brief tornado snapped several trees.
EF3	NW of Vanduser to NE of Blodgett	Scott	MO	37.0209°N 89.7338°W	1907 – 1931	14.25 mi (22.93 km)	600 yd (550 m)	Several site-built homes and mobile homes were either damaged or destroyed, with some of the site-built homes having complete roof loss and downed walls. Also, a shed and a garage were destroyed, three empty railroad cars were overturned, and several irrigation systems were blown around. A vehicle was blown out of the destroyed garage of one of the homes and damaged. Nine power poles and dozens of trees were downed as well.
EF2	Southwestern Sims to Northern Fairfield	Wayne	IL	38.37°N 88.53°W	1908 – 1920	9.48 mi (15.26 km)	150 yd (140 m)	A double-wide mobile home was destroyed, several other homes suffered mainly minor damage, and a building at a landfill was damaged. Several trees and power poles were downed as well.
EF0	E of Wellington	Iroquois	IL	40.5168°N 87.6733°W	1919 – 1923	4.52 mi (7.27 km)	75 yd (69 m)	An outbuilding had its roof torn off and numerous trees were downed.
EF2	WSW of Rileysburg to W of Covington	Vermillion, Warren	IN	40.1017°N 87.5307°W	1922 – 1926	5.94 mi (9.56 km)	150 yd (140 m)	Tornado developed just inside the state line and moved northeast. A church was pushed off of its foundation and had exterior walls collapsed and a rail car was overturned in Rileysburg. A grain elevator in town was damaged as well. Trees were downed and a couple of mobile homes were destroyed west of Covington as well.
EF1	Goodland to NW of Remington	Newton, Jasper	IN	40.7616°N 87.2974°W	1927 – 1932	5.52 mi (8.88 km)	100 yd (91 m)	A large grain elevator was heavily damaged, an outbuilding was destroyed, and small farm equipment was moved, with one piece being rolled 50 feet (15 m) into a downed grain bin; debris was thrown about 1 mile (1.6 km) away from this area. Multiple trees were downed along the path. This was the first time in November and the latest during the calendar year that a tornado had been recorded in Newton County since reliable records began in 1950.
EF2	N of Albion	Wayne, Edwards	IL	38.425°N 88.1666°W	1929 – 1944	7.86 mi (12.65 km)	300 yd (270 m)	An addition to a new home and an attached garage were destroyed, with two vehicles in the garage being turned around. Two 100-year-old barns were destroyed. Other residences had minor damage and several trees were downed.
EF2	Northern Veedersburg to NNE of Wingate	Fountain, Montgomery, Tippecanoe	IN	40.1163°N 87.2456°W	1932 – 1945	12.73 mi (20.49 km)	75 yd (69 m)	Tornado touched down in Veedersburg where there was roof damage to a large manufacturing plant. The most extensive damage with this tornado occurred in the town of Mellott, where a mobile home was completely destroyed and four others were either damaged or rolled off of their foundations. Elsewhere, an old business with a cinder-block base had its exterior walls collapsed, a barn and garage were destroyed, and the entire roof was removed from a home.
EF2	NNW of Albion	Wayne, Edwards	IL	38.419°N 88.1483°W	1933 – 1938	4.14 mi (6.66 km)	100 yd (91 m)	This tornado touched down just south of the previous Albion event (with the tornadoes occurring simultaneously) and destroyed two machine sheds and a barn. Many trees were downed as well.
EF2	NW of Otterbein to WNW of Brookston	Benton, White	IN	40.5557°N 87.1475°W	1940 – 1955	11.99 mi (19.30 km)	1,200 yd (1,100 m)	In Benton County, the tornado heavily damaged an outbuilding, with debris being thrown 3 miles (4.8 km) downstream and wood beams from the building piercing the roof of a nearby garage. Another outbuilding was heavily damaged and multiple trees were downed. Moving into White County, it intensified and grew into a large multiple-vortex tornado, destroying 20 to 25 barns and scattering debris over 2 miles (3.2 km) away. Ten wooden power poles were snapped and a small home lost its roof, with debris being thrown and stuck into the ground. This was the first time in November and the latest during the calendar year that a tornado had been recorded in Benton County since reliable records began in 1950.
EF2	N of Bellmont to S of Allendale	Wabash	IL	38.4892°N 87.9229°W	1944 – 1954	10.28 mi (16.54 km)	225 yd (206 m)	Four site-built homes were damaged and two mobile homes were destroyed, one of which was thrown across a road and wrapped around a tree, injuring the occupant. One of the damaged homes lost part of its roof, a nearby garage was destroyed (although many of the contents were left unharmed), and several outbuildings were destroyed.
EF1	SE of New Richmond to W of Linden	Montgomery	IN	40.1713°N 86.9572°W	1947 – 1950	1.78 mi (2.86 km)	40 yd (37 m)	The tornado hit two metal buildings near the Weaver Popcorn Plant, scattering metal debris, insulation, and wooden planks to the northeast.
EF1	NE of Otterbein	Tippecanoe	IN	40.4971°N 87.0778°W	1947 – 1951	3.89 mi (6.26 km)	50 yd (46 m)	A small shed was destroyed, nine utility poles were snapped, and trees were downed.
EF1	NE of Rensselaer to E of Gifford	Jasper	IN	40.9727°N 87.1152°W	1950 – 2000	10.24 mi (16.48 km)	100 yd (91 m)	Multiple grain bins and outbuildings were destroyed, with debris being strewn about 2 miles (3.2 km). Dozens of trees and several power poles were downed as well. This was the first November tornado in Jasper County since reliable records began in 1950.
EF0	South Raub	Tippecanoe	IN	40.3012°N 86.9224°W	1951 – 1952	0.25 mi (0.40 km)	50 yd (46 m)	A silo and small farm buildings were destroyed and many trees were downed.
EF2	NW of Chalmers	White	IN	40.6918°N 86.8785°W	1951 – 1957	4.15 mi (6.68 km)	300 yd (270 m)	Four power poles were snapped, roofing and siding was removed from a home, and two barns lost parts of their roofs. Another barn was destroyed, with debris being carried about 1 mile (1.6 km) to the northeast.
EF2	NW of Romney to S of Lafayette	Tippecanoe	IN	40.3013°N 86.9467°W	1952 – 1955	3.1 mi (5.0 km)	75 yd (69 m)	An elementary and middle school both sustained significant damage, with roof damage to both and a wall blown out of the gymnasium at the middle school. Some homes sustained roof and structural damage, and a few trees were downed as well.
EF2	W of Brookston	White	IN	40.5649°N 87.0791°W	1952 – 2001	9.23 mi (14.85 km)	900 yd (820 m)	A large, strong tornado impacted a farm, destroying two barns and throwing the debris more than 0.5 miles (0.80 km) away. In addition, it ripped the entire roof off a one-story home, with 2 by 4 feet (0.61 by 1.22 m) boards driven into a field 250 yards (230 m) away. The tornado crossed I-65, causing extensive barn and shed damage to another farm. Some power poles were damaged, but this may have been related to the tornado just to the north. Large trees were snapped.
EF3	SSE of Lafayette to SE of Walton	Tippecanoe, Clinton, Carroll, Cass	IN	40.3462°N 86.8342°W	1954 – 2027	39 mi (63 km)	100 yd (91 m)	Strong, long-tracked tornado caused EF3 structural damage to a Voestalpine factory and a Subaru plant, both southeast of Lafayette. The tornado moved northeast out of Tippecanoe County, through Clinton County, and into Carroll County, downing trees and causing property damage in areas north of Dayton, northwest of Rossville, and southern and eastern Carroll County, where several buildings were damaged at a hog farm. The tornado moved into Cass County northwest of Young America and moved through the county at EF2 strength, causing extensive damage to several homes, destroying farm buildings, and downing trees and power lines before dissipating.
EF0	Bailey	Muskegon	MI	43.26°N 85.87°W	1955 – 2000	3.86 mi (6.21 km)	75 yd (69 m)	One of several weak tornadoes that touched down along a 50 mi (80 km) path through Michigan. Mostly tree damage was incurred but there was also damage to several buildings and fences.
EF1	NW of Stockwell	Tippecanoe	IN	40.2874°N 86.8107°W	1956 – 2000	2.87 mi (4.62 km)	35 yd (32 m)	Two barns were damaged and a house sustained roof and siding damage, with debris being scattered considerable distances from all three structures.
EF2	WNW of Decker to SE of Vincennes	Knox	IN	38.5374°N 87.6121°W	1956 – 2006	8.81 mi (14.18 km)	100 yd (91 m)	A home had its second story removed and exterior walls collapsed north of Decker. Other homes sustained lesser damage, and tree damage occurred as well. Outbuildings were also damaged. One person was injured. The tornado dissipated just west of Monroe City.
EF0	S of Croton	Newaygo	MI	43.2962°N 85.8115°W	2000 – 2015	Unknown	95 yd (87 m)	One of several weak tornadoes that touched down along a 50-mile (80 km) path through Michigan. Mostly tree damage was incurred but there was also damage to several buildings and fences.
EF1	Medaryville to NE of Denham	Pulaski	IN	41.0765°N 86.8936°W	2003 – 2013	13.18 mi (21.21 km)	100 yd (91 m)	A grain bin was blown off of its foundation and flattened, a center pivot was torn apart, and a large barn was destroyed. Several structures in Medaryville were damaged and numerous trees were downed as well. Twigs were also found speared into vinyl siding.
EF3	Woodville, KY to Brookport, IL to NW of Eddyville, KY	McCracken (KY), Massac (IL), Pope (IL), Livingston (KY), Lyon (KY)	KY, IL	37.098°N 88.8781°W	2005 – 2056	42.5 mi (68.4 km)	500 yd (460 m)	3 deaths – See section on this tornado
EF1	NE of Monticello	White	IN	40.8227°N 86.5949°W	2007 – 2008	0.81 mi (1.30 km)	150 yd (140 m)	Four sections of a center pivot irrigation system were flipped, the roof and some walls were removed from a mobile home, and numerous trees were downed. A metal outbuilding was damaged as well.
EF2	Michigantown to N of Greentown	Clinton, Howard	IN	40.3263°N 86.3946°W	2013 – 2036	25.44 mi (40.94 km)	150 yd (140 m)	First of two tornadoes to strike Kokomo during the outbreak. A hog farm and several other properties were damaged northeast of Michigantown and east of Rossville. The tornado then moved into southern Kokomo, causing extensive damage to many homes, a bank, numerous fast-food restaurants, and several other businesses. Vehicles were flipped and trees were snapped and uprooted as well.
EF0	SSW of Logansport	Cass	IN	40.7276°N 86.3914°W	2020 – 2022	1.13 mi (1.82 km)	150 yd (140 m)	A warehouse sustained minor roof damage, a house lost its roof, several other homes sustained minor damage, and several trees were downed. Impact to the house that lost its roof occurred on a sunroom that had structural issues and aided in the wind being able to lift the roof of the house, preventing a higher rating. There was also damage in the southeast part of town; however, this was due to strong straight-line winds.
EF0	ESE of Big Rapids	Mecosta	MI	43.6502°N 85.3136°W	2020 – 2022	0.25 mi (0.40 km)	50 yd (46 m)	One of several weak tornadoes that touched down along a 50 mi (80 km) path through Michigan. Mostly tree damage was incurred but there was also damage to several buildings and fences.
EF2	Washington	Daviess	IN	38.6420°N 87.2224°W	2020 – 2023	2.8 mi (4.5 km)	125 yd (114 m)	Tornado started to the west-southwest of Washington and moved into town, knocking a home off of its foundation and damaging over 100 other structures, including a tire shop and several other businesses. Detached garages were destroyed and trees were snapped and uprooted as well.
EF1	Southern Cassopolis	Cass	MI	41.895°N 86.0079°W	2027 – 2029	0.38 mi (0.61 km)	50 yd (46 m)	The second story of a barn was destroyed, another barn lost its roof, and a garage was destroyed. Debris from the garage was scattered up to 500 yards away. Many trees were downed as well.
EF2	Southern Kokomo	Howard	IN	40.4639°N 86.1266°W	2029 – 2030	0.5 mi (0.80 km)	75 yd (69 m)	Second tornado to strike Kokomo during the outbreak. Touched down briefly in the southern part of the city, heavily damaging several well-built homes. A UAW building was damaged before the tornado lifted. In total, the two Kokomo tornadoes damaged or destroyed 300 homes. 30 businesses were damaged or destroyed as well. Five people were injured.
EF1	NE of Grissom Air Force Base	Miami	IN	40.6904°N 86.1211°W	2030 – 2033	2.87 mi (4.62 km)	250 yd (230 m)	Two hog barns lost their roofs, with one suffering collapsed walls. One part of the wall was thrown back into the rest of the barn, where it smashed the exhaust system. A mobile home's walls collapsed as well, with insulation scattered into a field. A billboard was blown over and a gas station's awning was damaged. Many trees were downed along the path as well.
EF2	SW of Lebanon	Boone	IN	40.0176°N 86.5340°W	2036 – 2042	3.67 mi (5.91 km)	75 yd (69 m)	Tornado touched down southwest of Lebanon, damaged buildings in an industrial area, and crossed Interstate 65, flipping several cars and tractor-trailers. It then moved into the southern part of town, where a Starbucks was heavily damaged, along with multiple nearby homes. Two people were injured when their tractor-trailer was flipped at a truck stop in Lebanon.
EF1	ENE of Mentone	Kosciusko	IN	41.1731°N 85.9864°W	2038 – 2040	1.05 mi (1.69 km)	250 yd (230 m)	Two homes sustained significant roof damage, another home sustained roof, porch, and window damage, a barn was pushed off of its foundation and received structural damage, a metal shed had a wall blown out and roof damage, and a small outbuilding was lifted, with debris being carried up to 1 mile (1.6 km) away. Over 50 trees were downed along the path, most of which were downed in a stand near the end of the path.
EF3	NW of Morganfield to E of Corydon	Union, Henderson	KY	37.7006°N 87.9403°W	2041 – 2100	14.12 mi (22.72 km)	200 yd (180 m)	A church roof was lifted and blown sideways, and frame homes sustained substantial structural damage. Many homes had roof damage as well, with one home losing its entire roof. Several barns and outbuildings were destroyed, some of which were large metal structures. A mobile home slid off its foundation, and another mobile home was disintegrated, with its undercarriage being thrown 50 yards (46 m) and little debris recovered from the site. The tops were blown off of grain bins, and a well-built home had a two-car garage ripped off, with roof, siding, and window damage to the rest of home. Metal was wrapped around trees, and many trees and power poles were downed.
EF2	SSW of Mier to ESE of La Fontaine	Grant, Wabash	IN	40.5515°N 85.8383°W	2042 – 2053	11.75 mi (18.91 km)	700 yd (640 m)	A hog barn sustained roof damage, a house lost a wall and part of its roof, and another house lost its entire roof. A garage was destroyed, and projectiles from the structure were found impaled into the roof of a nearby house. A two-story home had its top floor nearly removed. Multiple other homes sustained lesser damage, and tree damage also occurred. Dozens of vehicles were either damaged or destroyed as well.
EF2	SE of Silver Lake	Wabash, Kosciusko	IN	41.0366°N 85.8926°W	2043 – 2048	4.14 mi (6.66 km)	150 yd (140 m)	Four farm buildings were completely destroyed, several cows were killed, and a two-story home lost part of its roof and had structural damage to a second-floor bedroom (the room was slightly shifted and a wall was buckled out). Power poles were snapped and trees were downed as well. Two people were injured, both by flying debris in the two-story house.
EF1	NW of Gadsden to NW of Waugh	Boone	IN	40.0769°N 86.3762°W	2046 – 2050	3.62 mi (5.83 km)	33 yd (30 m)	Damage occurred mostly to trees.
EF1	SSW of Oswego	Kosciusko	IN	41.2970°N 85.7987°W	2054 – 2056	1.65 mi (2.66 km)	275 yd (251 m)	A center pivot irrigation system was damaged, seven power poles were either snapped or bent, a home suffered roof damage, and many trees were downed, a few of which fell onto a home and two vehicles.
EF0	S of Roseburg	Grant	IN	40.509°N 85.7249°W	2055 – 2056	0.04 mi (0.064 km)	20 yd (18 m)	A storage shed sustained roof damage. Numerous trees were damaged.
EF1	Northern Bedford	Lawrence	IN	38.8741°N 86.5057°W	2057 – 2059	1.27 mi (2.04 km)	50 yd (46 m)	Intermittent tornado tracked across the northern side of Bedford and caused roof and structural damage to several homes. Several trees and power lines were downed as well.
EF1	Atlanta	Hamilton, Tipton	IN	40.2111°N 86.0327°W	2105 – 2108	1.9 mi (3.1 km)	125 yd (114 m)	Numerous structures were damaged in Atlanta.
EF1	N of Princeton	Caldwell	KY	37.1507°N 87.9085°W	2118 – 2125	3.16 mi (5.09 km)	200 yd (180 m)	A large metal building had partial roof and wall loss, the front porch of a house was lifted up, and several houses and businesses had partial shingle loss. Dozens of trees were downed and several power poles were snapped as well.
EF0	S of Waters	Otsego	MI	44.8658°N 84.6928°W	2127 – 2128	0.29 mi (0.47 km)	150 yd (140 m)	Brief tornado touched down along Interstate 75, downing numerous poplar and evergreen trees.
EF3	SW of Nortonville to SE of White Plains	Hopkins	KY	37.1533°N 87.4898°W	2132 – 2140	8.23 mi (13.24 km)	200 yd (180 m)	Four homes were destroyed, including one double-wide mobile home. A dozen more homes had minor to moderate damage and several sheds and barns were destroyed. Hundreds of trees were downed as well. One person suffered minor injuries.
EF0	NW of Leslie	Ingham	MI	42.49°N 84.46°W	2145 – 2147	0.25 mi (0.40 km)	100 yd (91 m)	Brief tornado caused minor roof damage, tossed lawn furniture and deck steps, shifted a large shed, and heavily damaged a garage.
EF1	ESE of Scott	Van Wert	OH	40.9703°N 84.4573°W	2147 – 2149	2.14 mi (3.44 km)	150 yd (140 m)	A barn suffered extensive roof damage, including loss of trusses, while other barns sustained lesser roof damage. Trees were damaged, a horse trailer and some travel trailers were flipped, and some metal roofing was damaged near the end of the path.
EF1	SW of Greenville	Muhlenberg	KY	37.1588°N 87.2682°W	2150 – 2151	0.85 mi (1.37 km)	80 yd (73 m)	Fast-moving tornado tore parts of the roofs off of two mobile homes, buckled a door and blew out the side walls of a garage, and tore the roof and two walls off of a metal building. The roof of a patio was torn off and patio furniture was scattered over 100 yards (91 m) as well. Many trees were downed along the path.
EF2	NW of Ottoville to NE of Cloverdale	Putnam, Paulding	OH	40.9609°N 84.3852°W	2152 – 2203	11.11 mi (17.88 km)	440 yd (400 m)	In Paulding County, a barn sustained minor damage and a mobile home was shifted from its foundation. In Putnam County, two barns were damaged, with debris (including metal sheeting and wooden rafters) carried nearly a mile away. Several hay wagons were thrown as well. The tornado struck the town of Cloverdale before dissipating, where minor to moderate structural damage occurred, and many trees and power lines were downed. A church in town sustained extensive damage to its walls and roof, and a nearby home sustained collapse of a wall.
EF1	Huntsville	Butler	KY	37.1646°N 86.9048°W	2210 – 2216	5.46 mi (8.79 km)	200 yd (180 m)	Several site-built homes, mobile homes, and small outbuildings were suffered varying degrees of roof and wall damage and numerous trees were downed. One person was injured.
EF1	NW of North Baltimore	Wood	OH	41.19°N 83.713°W	2232 – 2234	1.04 mi (1.67 km)	75 yd (69 m)	A portion of a home's roof was ripped off, causing the structure's wall to collapse. A few trees were downed.
EF2	Perrysburg to Oregon	Wood, Lucas	OH	41.539°N 83.568°W	2235 – 2255	11.28 mi (18.15 km)	100 yd (91 m)	Several homes, apartment buildings, and businesses were either damaged or destroyed. Gas station awnings and industrial buildings sustained major damage. Several vehicles were damaged and dozens of trees were downed as well.
EF1	Jerry City	Wood	OH	41.252°N 83.5953°W	2241 – 2245	1.32 mi (2.12 km)	100 yd (91 m)	A mobile home was destroyed. A few other homes and buildings lost roofing and siding. Trees were downed.
EF1	E of Elmore	Ottawa	OH	41.465°N 83.223°W	2300 – 2302	0.76 mi (1.22 km)	75 yd (69 m)	A barn was destroyed, with debris being scattered through a field, and wood splinters were impaled into the ground.
EF1	SE of Orlinda	Robertson	TN	36.5862°N 86.6901°W	0031 – 0032	0.97 mi (1.56 km)	100 yd (91 m)	Several homes sustained roof and window damage and part of a wooden fence was blown down.
EF0	Northwestern Portland	Sumner	TN	36.5875°N 86.522°W	0042 – 0043	0.35 mi (0.56 km)	50 yd (46 m)	The roof was blown off of a fire hall and into apartment buildings, causing mostly window damage. A few homes and a church sustained minor damage as well.
EF0	NW of Fayetteville	Lincoln	TN	35.2220°N 86.6418°W	0337 – 0340	0.57 mi (0.92 km)	25 yd (23 m)	The front porch of a home was lifted up, taking a large portion of metal roof with it. Debris was thrown about 50 yards (46 m). A two-story home sustained vinyl siding damage, a small wooden barn was lifted and thrown, and a piece of wood smashed into another house, leaving a hole. A carport was lifted and crushed and roofing was peeled off of a mobile home, with debris being strewn several hundred yards. Many trees were downed along the path, which was intermittent.

=== November 26 event ===
List of confirmed tornadoes – Tuesday, November 26, 2013
EF#	Location	County / Parish	State	Start Coord.	Time (UTC)	Path length	Max width	Summary
EF1	S of Stonemill Creek	Gulf	FL	30.0866°N 85.1899°W	1500 – 1505	2.92 mi (4.70 km)	50 yd (46 m)	Several homes and outbuildings were damaged, a vehicle suffered significant damage, and a boat was blown away. Numerous trees and power lines were downed as well.
EF0	SW of Red Hill	Liberty	FL	30.175°N 85.1177°W	1513 – 1519	4.23 mi (6.81 km)	50 yd (46 m)	Several trees were downed with this tornado that came from the same supercell as the Gulf County tornado.
EF2	Atlantic Beach/Morehead City	Carteret	NC	34.697°N 76.774°W	0315 – 0320	5.25 mi (8.45 km)	200 yd (180 m)	A strong tornado began as a waterspout south of Bogue Banks and came ashore in western Atlantic Beach, causing extensive roof damage to several condominiums. Several houses were damaged as the tornado moved away from the beach, most of which was due to falling trees. The tornado then crossed the Bogue Sound, once again becoming a waterspout before coming ashore in Morehead City near Carteret Community College and Carteret General Hospital. It blew out windows and caused significant structural damage to buildings on the college campus but only caused minor damage to the hospital. However, many vehicles and outbuildings near the hospital also received significant damage. The tornado moved north-northeast through residential areas, causing roof and siding damage to many homes. The tornado then continued into Newport River and became a waterspout for the third time before dissipating. Many trees were downed along the path, with some falling on and damaging numerous homes. Two people suffered minor injuries.

== December ==
Confirmed tornadoes by Enhanced Fujita rating
EFU	EF0	EF1	EF2	EF3	EF4	EF5	Total
0	4	11	3	0	0	0	18

=== December 14 event ===
List of confirmed tornadoes – Saturday, December 14, 2013
EF#	Location	County / Parish	State	Coord.	Time (UTC)	Path length	Max width	Summary
EF1	Palm Coast	Flagler	FL	29.52°N 81.31°W	0000 – 0010	9.52 mi (15.32 km)	150 yd (140 m)	An intermittent tornado damaged homes and downed trees.

=== December 20 event ===
List of confirmed tornadoes – Friday, December 20, 2013
EF#	Location	County / Parish	State	Coord.	Time (UTC)	Path length	Max width	Summary
EF0	WNW of Reganton	Warren	MS	32.1554°N 90.7746°W	2241 – 2242	0.24 mi (0.39 km)	50 yd (46 m)	Limbs and parts of the trunks of five to eight trees were broken off, with some being scattered across a roadway.
EF0	S of Newman	Hinds	MS	32.205°N 90.705°W	2256 – 2257	0.14 mi (0.23 km)	30 yd (27 m)	A very brief tornado blew a tree down across a road and scattered limbs and tree debris (leaves, twigs, etc.).
EF1	Redfield	Jefferson	AR	34.431°N 92.188°W	0033 – 0035	1.48 mi (2.38 km)	150 yd (140 m)	Several homes sustained roof damage, several sheds were destroyed, a trampoline and a swing set were thrown and wrapped around trees, and numerous trees and power lines were downed.

=== December 21 event ===
List of confirmed tornadoes – Saturday, December 21, 2013
EF#	Location	County / Parish	State	Start Coord.	Time (UTC)	Path length	Max width	Summary
EF1	SW of Woodville	Tyler	TX	30.7418°N 94.4977°W	1958 – 1959	0.87 mi (1.40 km)	25 yd (23 m)	Several large hardwood trees were blown down or snapped; one landed on a parked car.
EF1	N of Town Bluff	Tyler	TX	30.7867°N 94.2042°W	2022 – 2023	1.48 mi (2.38 km)	25 yd (23 m)	Part of the metal roof was ripped off a small rural grocery store and blown into the COE park, damaging several picnic areas. Several trees were downed or snapped.
EF1	WNW of Kirbyville	Jasper	TX	30.6953°N 94.0208°W	2050 – 2051	0.4 mi (0.64 km)	25 yd (23 m)	A fast-moving tornado ripped off a well-built carport/garage attached to a home. Part of the structure landed on the home, but some of the metal debris was thrown for 200 yards (180 m).
EF2	SW of Hughes to NW of Tarsus	St. Francis	AR	34.907°N 90.559°W	2113 – 2129	15.57 mi (25.06 km)	300 yd (270 m)	1 death – Three mobile homes and a metal shed were destroyed, two homes sustained roof damage, a barn was damaged, and irrigation pivots were overturned. Trees and power lines were downed along the path. Three additional people were injured.
EF1	NE of Downsville	Union	LA	32.6405°N 92.3770°W	2143 – 2145	0.76 mi (1.22 km)	75 yd (69 m)	Several trees and a barn were damaged.
EF2	ESE of Dermott, AR to NNE of Cleveland, MS	Chicot (AR), Desha (AR), Bolivar (MS)	AR, MS	33.51°N 91.362°W	2251 – 2328	41 mi (66 km)	440 yd (400 m)	A strong, long-track tornado touched down in Chicot County, snapping power poles and flipping two tractor-trailers. Several homes and farm buildings and the Yellow Bend Port Facility sustained minor to major roof damage before the tornado moved into Desha County east of Halley, where a mobile home was knocked off of its foundation and had its porch torn off. In addition, a large metal intermodal shipping container was thrown into the mobile home, smashing the kitchen area. Elsewhere in Desha County, one house had its porch torn off, roof damage, broken windows, and a hole punched in the wall, while a second house had a large amount of roofing torn off, and a third house had the attached carport torn off and blown onto the roof. Several storage sheds were destroyed, and numerous trees and power lines were downed as well. The tornado briefly moved back into Chicot County before crossing the Mississippi River into Bolivar County, where a well-built tractor shed was destroyed, several farm buildings were damaged, and numerous trees and power poles were downed before the tornado lifted. Two people sustained minor injuries; both occurring in the overturned tractor-trailers in Chicot County.
EF2	Rena Lara to Clarksdale	Coahoma	MS	34.149°N 90.767°W	2319 – 2328	10.07 mi (16.21 km)	300 yd (270 m)	1 death – Four homes suffered minor to significant roof damage, a mobile home was heavily damaged (where the fatality occurred), two large garages were destroyed, and two light poles over the football field at Coahoma County High School were bent and destroyed. An elementary school sustained roof and window damage and numerous trees were downed as well. One additional person was injured.
EF0	S of Wadesboro	Calloway	KY	36.7343°N 88.3178°W	2331 – 2332	0.33 mi (0.53 km)	50 yd (46 m)	Power lines were downed, and a few trees were uprooted.
EF1	SE of Dundee	Tunica	MS	34.4465°N 90.4171°W	2340 – 2344	2.67 mi (4.30 km)	200 yd (180 m)	A tornado just northeast of the Coahoma County line pushed a church at least 10 feet (3.0 m) off of its foundation, damaged multiple homes, and rolled a trailer. Debris was thrown at least 1 mile (1.6 km) from the damaged homes. Numerous trees and power lines were downed as well.
EF1	SW of Senatobia	Panola, Tate	MS	34.519°N 90.094°W	2357 – 0002	6.17 mi (9.93 km)	200 yd (180 m)	Four homes sustained roof damage, the covered porch of a two-story home was lifted and deposited onto the roof of a garage, and several trees were downed.
EF0	NE of Independence	Tate	MS	34.7412°N 89.7413°W	0013 – 0017	0.72 mi (1.16 km)	100 yd (91 m)	Many homes and a church sustained minor roof damage and trees and power lines were downed.
EF1	Campbellsville	Taylor	KY	37.3333°N 85.396°W	0407 – 0413	5.53 mi (8.90 km)	300 yd (270 m)	A tornado touched down west of Campbellsville, destroying small outbuildings before moving through town and to the northeast, where numerous homes sustained roof damage and many trees were downed before the tornado dissipated.
EF1	NNW of Cynthiana	Harrison	KY	38.457°N 84.3829°W	0429 – 0434	3.49 mi (5.62 km)	110 yd (100 m)	Many barns and garages were either damaged or destroyed, several homes and outbuildings had roof and structural damage, and numerous trees and power lines were downed. Debris was blown in all directions from some of the structures.
EF1	NW of Millersburg	Bourbon	KY	38.30°N 84.2477°W	0441 – 0445	5.74 mi (9.24 km)	125 yd (114 m)	Several large barns, garages, and outbuildings were either significantly damaged or destroyed, with debris scattered in all directions, and some well anchored solid footers from a garage and a barn were lifted up and thrown 75 yards (69 m). Trees and power poles were downed as well.

== See also ==
- Tornadoes of 2013
- Tornado outbreak of November 17, 2013
- List of United States tornadoes from August to October 2013
- List of United States tornadoes from January to March 2014
