= Marble Hill =

Marble Hill is the name of:

== Antigua and Barbuda ==
- Marble Hill, Antigua and Barbuda, a village in Saint John

== Australia ==
- Marble Hill, South Australia, the vice-regal residence in the Adelaide Hills

== Ireland ==
- Marble Hill, County Donegal, a village in County Donegal

== United Kingdom ==
- Marble Hill House, a villa on the banks of the River Thames near London
  - Marble Hill Park, an English Heritage park surrounding Marble Hill House

== United States ==
- Marble Hill, Missouri
- Marble Hill, Manhattan, a section of the borough of Manhattan in New York City
  - Marble Hill – 225th Street (IRT Broadway – Seventh Avenue Line), a subway station serving that neighborhood via the 1 train
  - Marble Hill (Metro-North station), a Metro-North Hudson Line commuter rail station serving that neighborhood
- Marble Hill, Tennessee, a neighborhood in Lynchburg
- Marble Hill Nuclear Power Plant, an unfinished nuclear power plant in southern Indiana, USA

== See also ==
- Marblehill, Georgia, a town in Pickens County, Georgia, U.S.
- Marble Hills, a range of hills in West Antarctica
