= List of United States tornadoes from January to March 2014 =

This is a list of all tornadoes that were confirmed by local offices of the National Weather Service in the United States from January to March 2014. Based on the 1991–2010 average, 35 tornadoes touch down in January, 29 touch down in February and 80 touch down in March. These tornadoes are commonly focused across the Southern United States due to their proximity to the unstable airmass and warm waters of the Gulf of Mexico, as well as California in association with winter storms.

January was significantly below average with virtually no activity occurring during the month. The only day that had tornadoes was January 11, when four EF0 tornadoes touched down in Georgia and Virginia. February was above average with 44 tornadoes, although all but one of the tornadoes touched down during a moderate outbreak from February 20–21. March was also well below average with only 20 tornadoes, which was 1/4 of the amount of activity typically seen during the month. Seven of the tornadoes touched down in California, including five that touched down in a small outbreak on March 26.

== United States yearly total ==
Confirmed tornadoes by Enhanced Fujita rating
EFU	EF0	EF1	EF2	EF3	EF4	EF5	Total
0	510	321	71	20	7	0	929

== January ==
Confirmed tornadoes by Enhanced Fujita rating
EFU	EF0	EF1	EF2	EF3	EF4	EF5	Total
0	4	0	0	0	0	0	4

=== January 11 event ===
List of confirmed tornadoes – Saturday, January 11, 2014 (Note: All dates are based on the local time zone where the tornado touched down; however, all times are in Coordinated Universal Time for consistency.)
EF#	Location	County / Parish	State	Start Coord.	Time (UTC)	Path length	Max width	Damage (Note: All damage totals are in 2014 USD unless otherwise stated.)	Summary
EF0	NE of Waleska	Cherokee	GA	34.3328°N 84.5286°W	1237 – 1241	2.9 mi (4.7 km)	10 yd (9.1 m)	$3,000	Several trees were downed and a fence was damaged as the tornado skipped along northeast of Waleska.
EF0	NW of Smithfield	Isle of Wight	VA	37.0250°N 76.6377°W	2032 – 2034	1.36 mi (2.19 km)	100 yd (91 m)	$20,000	Many trees and several power lines were downed, with some trees falling on homes and vehicles. The tornado dissipated over the James River.
EF0	SE of Isle of Wight	Isle of Wight	VA	36.8769°N 76.6721°W	2032 – 2035	1.95 mi (3.14 km)	50 yd (46 m)	$20,000	Numerous trees were downed, some of which fell onto homes, causing roof damage.
EF0	Fox Hill	Hampton	VA	37.08°N 76.30°W	2050 – 2053	1.25 mi (2.01 km)	75 yd (69 m)	$100,000	A church and numerous homes sustained roof damage, the roof was entirely blown off of a school maintenance compound, and the poorly constructed Fox Hill Athletic Association building was destroyed. Over 50 trees were downed and a vehicle had its windows blown out as well.

== February ==
Confirmed tornadoes by Enhanced Fujita rating
EFU	EF0	EF1	EF2	EF3	EF4	EF5	Total
0	21	19	4	0	0	0	44

=== February 20 event ===
List of confirmed tornadoes – Thursday, February 20, 2014
EF#	Location	County / Parish	State	Start Coord.	Time (UTC)	Path length	Max width	Damage	Summary
EF2	Martinsburg to NNE of Detroit	Pike	IL	39.518°N 90.841°W	2025–2035	12.09 mi (19.46 km)	80 yd (73 m)	$0	A tornado touched down on the north side of Martinsburg, causing minor roof, window, and fascia damage. It moved east-northeast, downing many trees, including numerous large pine trees. Next, the tornado caused minor fascia damage to a home, destroyed three machine sheds and two grain bins, damaged several head stones in a cemetery, and moved the east side of a farmhouse about 5 inches (13 cm) off of its foundation as well as removing part of its roof. The upper half of a large barn was removed, two canvas hoop sheds were destroyed, and the south end of a hog building was pushed to the northeast, with part of the roof being thrown over a 1/2-mile (0.80 km). One person was injured.
EF0	NW of Chapin	Morgan	IL	39.7853°N 90.4215°W	2048–2049	0.27 mi (0.43 km)	25 yd (23 m)	$0	A tornado briefly touched down in an open field, causing no damage.
EF0	NW of Concord to E of Arenzville	Morgan, Cass	IL	39.8193°N 90.4178°W	2052–2100	8.17 mi (13.15 km)	50 yd (46 m)	$0	No damage was reported.
EF0	E of Divernon	Sangamon	IL	39.5671°N 89.6256°W	2143–2144	0.22 mi (350 m)	75 yd (69 m)	$30,000	A brief tornado tore the roof off of a barn.
EF1	S of Mechanicsburg to WNW of Illiopolis	Sangamon	IL	39.7648°N 89.391°W	2157–2206	8.25 mi (13.28 km)	300 yd (270 m)	$990,000	Several outbuildings were damaged, several homes sustained roof damage, a trailer was flipped, and numerous trees and power poles were downed.
EF1	NE of Highland to ESE of Ohlman	Madison, Bond	IL	38.7575°N 89.6151°W	2157–2212	12.31 mi (19.81 km)	50 yd (46 m)	$0	Window, roof, and tree damage was observed at a home, and a nearby metal storage shed and farm outbuilding were completely destroyed. Another farmstead was struck as the tornado tracked northeast, where a pole barn was completely destroyed and extensive damage to a home was inflicted after a large tree fell on it. Intermittent damage to outbuildings and trees, in addition to minor damage to a home, occurred before the tornado lifted.
EF2	S of Pana to WSW of Westervelt	Montgomery, Shelby, Christian	IL	39.2586°N 89.234°W	2219–2233	22.38 mi (36.02 km)	200 yd (180 m)	$600,000	A garage lost a large section of its shingles, and the entire structure was twisted slightly off its foundation. A barn had a large section of its roof ripped off, with metal panels thrown about 0.5 mi (0.80 km). A double trussed metal transmission tower was downed, and a garage and several outbuildings were damaged. A home sustained significant damage to its roof; the occupant was injured. Numerous trees were snapped or uprooted.
EF1	N of Brownstown	Fayette	IL	39.0158°N 88.998°W	2236–2242	4.8 mi (7.7 km)	50 yd (46 m)	$0	Several large trees were snapped or downed. Numerous machine sheds sustained damage, some extensively. Three power poles were snapped.
EF1	S of Deering	Pemiscot	MO	36.1895°N 89.8812°W	2239–2240	0.24 mi (390 m)	70 yd (64 m)	$75,000	A brief tornado damaged several houses, a carport, and a shed. Most of the damage to the houses was to roofing. A single-wide trailer was overturned onto a tree and a truck, and numerous other trees were downed as well. Five people were injured.
EF1	WSW of Carbondale	Jackson	IL	37.6987°N 89.3713°W	2240–2241	0.39 mi (630 m)	50 yd (46 m)	$10,000	Several trees were downed and a home sustained siding and soffit damage.
EF0	W of Findlay	Shelby	IL	39.5176°N 88.8109°W	2240–2241	0.28 mi (450 m)	50 yd (46 m)	$0	A brief tornado in an open field caused no damage.
EF1	W of Hayti	Pemiscot	MO	36.2349°N 89.8029°W	2241–2242	0.04 mi (0.064 km)	25 yd (23 m)	$10,000	A brief tornado damaged the roof of a building.
EF1	NE of Moccasin to SE of Holland	Effingham	IL	39.1784°N 88.7233°W	2254–2256	1.54 mi (2.48 km)	100 yd (91 m)	$80,000	A tornado remained mostly over open fields but did snap several power poles as it crossed IL 33.
EF0	W of Chrisman	Edgar	IL	39.7821°N 87.7409°W	2343–2346	3 mi (4.8 km)	75 yd (69 m)	$0	A rain-wrapped tornado caused no damage.
EF0	E of Crawfordsville	Montgomery	IN	40.0044°N 86.8666°W	0040–0048	7.48 mi (12.04 km)	40 yd (37 m)	$75,000	Numerous outbuildings were damaged. Shingles were ripped off homes, a part of a Pilot truck stop canopy was damaged, and treetops were sheared off.
EF0	W of Wheatcroft to N of Clay	Webster	KY	37.48°N 87.8974°W	0042–0050	6.22 mi (10.01 km)	125 yd (114 m)	$30,000	Several small trees were snapped or downed, and a barn sustained minor roof damage.
EF0	ENE of Flowers	Walthall	MS	31.0737°N 90.0019°W	0111-0112	0.45 mi (0.72 km)	40 yd (37 m)	$5,000	A weak tornado touched down uprooting several large pine trees and snapping large branches. A house roof was damaged by a falling tree.
EF0	Claxton	Caldwell	KY	37.1°N 87.75°W	0112–0114	1.59 mi (2.56 km)	125 yd (114 m)	$8,000	Several small trees and tree limbs were downed to the east-northeast of Princeton.
EF0	E of Columbia	Marion	MS	31.253°N 89.77°W	0148–0149	0.52 mi (840 m)	50 yd (46 m)	$15,000	Several trees were downed.
EF0	ENE of Arlington	Rush	IN	39.656°N 85.5679°W	0232	0.04 mi (0.064 km)	25 yd (23 m)	$12,000	A homestead exhibited signs of damage that appeared to be from a tornado; several trees were downed, with one blown through the back of a tin shed, and the roof was removed from an outbuilding.
EF1	NNE of Mamou	Evangeline	LA	30.6913°N 92.3903°W	0233–0235	2.65 mi (4.26 km)	75 yd (69 m)	$50,000	Several barns and garages were destroyed, and several homes were damaged, consisting mainly of shingles and siding being removed. One home had a tree fall on it, temporarily trapping the residents inside; however, they were rescued without injury. At least seven power poles were downed as well.
EF1	ENE of Courtland to W of Athens	Lawrence, Limestone	AL	34.6889°N 87.2589°W	0245–0300	10.72 mi (17.25 km)	450 yd (410 m)	Unknown	A tornado touched down at a marina on the northern side of the Tennessee River. The marina and several nearby condos and homes sustained minor structural damage. A utility building was destroyed, a manufactured home was damaged, and Clements High School's athletic fields sustained minor damage. As the tornado continued, it caused mostly minor roof damage to numerous houses, either directly from the wind or from falling trees. It then crossed the Elk River and dissipated on the northern side of the river. Many trees and power poles were downed along the path, and a car was crushed. A large EF3 tornado impacted this same area later in April.
EF1	S of Rogersville	Lauderdale	AL	34.7858°N 87.315°W	0251–0253	1.82 mi (2.93 km)	400 yd (370 m)	Unknown	Many trees were snapped or uprooted and at least two utility poles were snapped. Several homes sustained minor roof damage.
EF1	SE of Anderson	Lauderdale	AL	34.895°N 87.2783°W	0255–0258	2.67 mi (4.30 km)	500 yd (460 m)	Unknown	Several well-built homes sustained minor to moderate roof damage, with one roof having significant uplift. A child suffered minor injuries inside one of the homes. Many trees and a power pole were downed as well.
EF1	SW of Elkmont	Limestone	AL	34.8798°N 87.0707°W	0305–0307	2.73 mi (4.39 km)	500 yd (460 m)	Unknown	A tornado to the northwest of Athens caused roof damage to a house and downed numerous trees and power poles.
EF1	N of Osgood	Ripley	IN	39.1792°N 85.2854°W	0314–0315	0.81 mi (1.30 km)	50 yd (46 m)	$100,000	A mobile home was moved 15 feet (4.6 m) off of its foundation, with it knocking down two 2-foot (0.61 m) high brick walls. Windows were blown out of the mobile home and it sustained major roof damage. Insulation was strewn around as well. Elsewhere, two pole barns were damaged, with the southeast corner of one being collapsed and siding being removed from all four sides. The second barn lost a lot of siding and part of its roof.
EF1	WSW of Moselle	Jones	MS	31.455°N 89.366°W	0328–0335	4.62 mi (7.44 km)	100 yd (91 m)	$400,000	The roofs of five chicken houses and a large metal shed sustained significant damage. A house sustained minor damage, and the porch of a mobile home was destroyed. Many trees were downed along the path.
EF0	W of Ellisville	Jones	MS	31.607°N 89.255°W	0350–0351	0.6 mi (0.97 km)	50 yd (46 m)	$10,000	A brief and weak tornado downed several trees.
EF1	Marble Hill	Moore	TN	35.1935°N 86.3331°W	0353–0355	1.64 mi (2.64 km)	400 yd (370 m)	Unknown	Several barns and farms were damaged. A well-built home sustained very minor siding damage, and large trees were snapped or uprooted.
EF0	SE of Phillipsburg	Montgomery	OH	39.889°N 84.4078°W	0353–0355	2.03 mi (3.27 km)	80 yd (73 m)	$150,000	A garage's door was blown in, leading to the removal of the roof and two walls. The roof was flipped and dropped in the yard. The tornado moved northeast, removing part of the roof from a home and throwing pieces of it into another home, breaking two windows. Lawn furniture was blown small distances as well. A large portion of a barn's roof was removed, and a second barn lost part of its roof and wood siding. Many trees were downed along the path.
EF1	W of Winchester	Franklin	TN	35.176°N 86.2048°W	0408–0409	1.05 mi (1.69 km)	100 yd (91 m)	Unknown	Several trees were snapped or uprooted, an outbuilding was destroyed, and a home sustained roof damage. A separate farm building was destroyed, with its debris inflicting major damage to a nearby home.
EF1	E of Estill Springs	Franklin	TN	35.287°N 85.992°W	0423–0425	1.98 mi (3.19 km)	400 yd (370 m)	Unknown	Numerous trees were snapped or twisted. A large outbuilding was destroyed, and a home sustained minor roof damage.
EF1	NW of Pelham	Coffee	TN	35.3303°N 85.9324°W	0429–0431	1.21 mi (1.95 km)	250 yd (230 m)	$200,000	Numerous trees were snapped or uprooted and two billboards were damaged. A farm sustained significant damage, with three grain silos blown on their sides and a barn lost part of its roof; an outbuilding was also destroyed.

=== February 21 event ===
List of confirmed tornadoes – Friday, February 21, 2014
EF#	Location	County / Parish	State	Start Coord.	Time (UTC)	Path length	Max width	Damage	Summary
EF0	SSW of Kilbourne	Delaware	OH	40.2952°N 82.9659°W	0554–0555	0.13 mi (0.21 km)	80 yd (73 m)	$100,000	Numerous trees were damaged. A home sustained partial shingle loss, had a couple of windows broken, and had its garage door blown in. A utility pole and transformer were snapped, with electrical lines downed. A barn sustained significant damage, and an unanchored storage shed was moved off its foundation.
EF2	NE of Fort Payne	DeKalb	AL	34.4941°N 85.6754°W	0628–0631	0.83 mi (1.34 km)	50 yd (46 m)	Unknown	Three large tractor trailers were flipped, one of which landed on top of a nearby factory's roof. A medium-sized metal building had its roof and much of its metal siding removed; the column anchorage was severely bent and failed. As the tornado skipped along the path, significant structural damage occurred to several homes, with the roof completely removed and at least two exterior brick walls collapsed on two houses. Numerous trees were snapped or uprooted. Two sheds, one small and the other medium-sized, were completely destroyed, while nearby homes sustained minor roof, siding, and window damage. A small apartment complex was hit, with partial roof and siding loss and broken windows. Nearby smaller buildings sustained minor roof damage, another home had partial roof loss, and plastic fencing around a pool was blown out. One person was injured.
EF0	Branchville	St. Clair	AL	33.6512°N 86.4678°W	0756–0800	4.2 mi (6.8 km)	150 yd (140 m)	$0	A mobile home and several two-story houses sustained minor roof damage. Approximately 90 to 140 trees were snapped or uprooted.
EF2	WNW of Dublin to SSE of Wrightsville	Laurens, Johnson	GA	32.5745°N 82.9754°W	1321–1341	17.47 mi (28.12 km)	200 yd (180 m)	$540,000	A strong tornado touched down just east of the W. H. 'Bud' Barron Airport, where it destroyed a house. It then moved through north Dublin, where it damaged 59 houses and downed 300 to 500 trees. The tornado weakened as it moved through eastern Laurens County and into Johnson County, with one mobile home being lifted off of its foundation and another's porch being blown off. The doors of the Piney Mountain Fire Department in Johnson County were blown off before the tornado dissipated.
EF0	WSW of Tifton	Tift	GA	31.43°N 83.576°W	1329–1331	2.22 mi (3.57 km)	300 yd (270 m)	$100,000	A weak tornado moved through areas to the southwest of Tifton along US 82, with a home that was setting on blocks being blown 20 feet (6.1 m). Other homes in the area had only minor damage. A chain-link fence and two billboards were blown down, with the wooden support poles of the billboards being snapped. Continuing, the tornado flipped two sheds and damaged several businesses and an incomplete metal building, part of which collapsed. It then caused roof and air-conditioning unit damage to a Lowe's and a Walmart before dissipating. Several trees were downed along the path.
EF0	N of Foneswood	Westmoreland	VA	38.1114°N 76.9024°W	1712–1714	0.84 mi (1,350 m)	25 yd (23 m)	$15,000	Numerous trees were downed or snapped.
EF0	W of Pembroke	Robeson	NC	34.6697°N 79.2903°W	1715–1717	0.49 mi (790 m)	25 yd (23 m)	$9,000	A brief tornado in a rural area near I-74. A large shed was rolled over, damaging a single-wide mobile home, and three homes sustained minor damage, with one having its porch lifted off. Several trees were downed along the path.
EF0	Compton to ENE of Lusby	St. Mary's, Calvert	MD	38.242°N 76.68°W	1723–1739	23.63 mi (38.03 km)	75 yd (69 m)	$10,000	Numerous trees were knocked down.
EF0	Southern St. Pauls	Robeson	NC	34.7993°N 78.9753°W	1738–1740	0.16 mi (260 m)	35 yd (32 m)	$11,000	A brief tornado on the south side of St. Pauls caused minor to moderate roof an porch damage to several homes, and destroyed multiple sheds, one of which was thrown 40 yards (37 m) and lofted into an oak tree. A large travel trailer was blown onto its side, a couple of unanchored buildings were pushed off of their foundations, and multiple trees were downed as well.
EF1	W of Grantham	Wayne	NC	35.277°N 78.258°W	1826–1830	0.83 mi (1.34 km)	175 yd (160 m)	$25,000	A single-wide mobile home was completely destroyed and disintegrated, with the steel frame being thrown about 35 yards (32 m). At least two outbuildings were leveled and several others had substantial roof damage as well. Numerous trees were downed along the path.

=== February 28 event ===
List of confirmed tornadoes – Friday, February 28, 2014
EF#	Location	County / Parish	State	Start Coord.	Time (UTC)	Path length	Max width	Damage	Summary
EF0	SE of Woodland	Yolo	CA	38.6297°N 121.7056°W	0217–0222	0.74 mi (1.19 km)	50 yd (46 m)	$0	A member of the public witnessed a tornado over open country. It caused no damage.

== March ==
Confirmed tornadoes by Enhanced Fujita rating
EFU	EF0	EF1	EF2	EF3	EF4	EF5	Total
0	13	5	2	0	0	0	20

=== March 1 event ===
List of confirmed tornadoes – Saturday, March 1, 2014
EF#	Location	County / Parish	State	Start Coord.	Time (UTC)	Path length	Max width	Damage	Summary
EF0	Western Mesa	Maricopa	AZ	33.42°N 111.85°W	1940 – 1945	0.45 mi (0.72 km)	100 yd (91 m)	$50,000	The tornado touched down in a park and moved over an apartment complex, damaging roof tiles, blowing in a car's windshield and two apartment windows, and lifting a hot tub up into the clouds. Several trees and a power pole were downed as well. This was the first confirmed tornado in the Greater Phoenix area since January 2005.

=== March 6 event ===
List of confirmed tornadoes – Thursday, March 6, 2014
EF#	Location	County / Parish	State	Start Coord.	Time (UTC)	Path length	Max width	Damage	Summary
EF0	SW of Largo	Pinellas	FL	27.86°N 82.85°W	1700 – 1701	0.05 mi (0.080 km)	10 yd (9.1 m)	$0	A picture was taken of a waterspout moving onshore.
EF0	Rocky Creek	Hillsborough	FL	27.98°N 82.60°W	1738 – 1739	1.38 mi (2.22 km)	15 yd (14 m)	$0	A waterspout moved onshore near the Courtney Campbell Causeway (SR 60); debris was reported in the air as it moved through a mangrove forest.
EF0	SSW of Okeelanta	Palm Beach	FL	26.58°N 80.71°W	1930 – 1931	0.25 mi (0.40 km)	50 yd (46 m)	$0	A brief tornado downed power lines near US 27.

=== March 25 event ===
List of confirmed tornadoes – Tuesday, March 25, 2014
EF#	Location	County / Parish	State	Start Coord.	Time (UTC)	Path length	Max width	Damage	Summary
EF0	SSE of Chico	Butte	CA	39.71°N 121.67°W	0215–0217	0.26 mi (0.42 km)	10 yd (9.1 m)	$0	A weak tornado downed a rotted tree and snapped branches off other trees.

=== March 26 event ===
List of confirmed tornadoes – Wednesday, March 26, 2014
EF#	Location	County / Parish	State	Start Coord.	Time (UTC)	Path length	Max width	Damage	Summary
EF0	SW of Pleasant Grove	Sutter	CA	38.81°N 121.53°W	0024–0026	0.63 mi (1.01 km)	25 yd (23 m)	$0	A tornado left swirl marks in an open field, but caused no damage.
EF1	WNW of Bayliss (1st tornado)	Glenn	CA	39.59°N 122.09°W	0030 – 0033	0.7 mi (1.1 km)	50 yd (46 m)	$0	A tornado struck a pheasant pen and a nearby outbuilding. Both structures had their roof torn off, and pieces of the outbuilding's roof were found 800 to 1,000 ft (240 to 300 m) away. Pieces weighing up to 150 lb (68 kg) were thrown up to 350 ft (110 m) from the structure.
EF1	WSW of Bayliss (2nd tornado)	Glenn	CA	39.57°N 122.10°W	0033 – 0038	0.95 mi (1.53 km)	50 yd (46 m)	$0	As the 0030 UTC event dissipated, a second EF1 tornado formed nearby and struck a farm. A barn and outbuilding were damaged and a nearby carport was overturned. An area of cottonwood trees was significantly damaged. Additionally, a stop sign was sheared off its pole and thrown 150 ft (46 m).
EF1	SE of Artois	Glenn	CA	39.58°N 122.14°W	0045 – 0050	0.58 mi (0.93 km)	50 yd (46 m)	$0	A tornado struck several farms and caused significant damage to nearby structures. More than 72 almond trees were uprooted and had their crop stripped. A tractor was thrown 157 ft (48 m) at one of the farms. After briefly lifting, the tornado caused additional damage to cottonwood trees, with one being uprooted and thrown 618 ft (188 m) into a field.
EF0	Western Roseville	Placer	CA	38.76°N 121.42°W	0110 – 0120	4.02 mi (6.47 km)	20 yd (18 m)	$0	A weak tornado in the western part of Roseville caused roof and stucco damage, blew out two windows, and blew down 25 to 30 feet (7.6 to 9.1 m) of fence.

=== March 27 event ===
List of confirmed tornadoes – Thursday, March 27, 2014
EF#	Location	County / Parish	State	Start Coord.	Time (UTC)	Path length	Max width	Damage	Summary
EF1	E of Weatherby to WSW of Jameson	Daviess	MO	39.91°N 94.20°W	2003 – 2015	9.25 mi (14.89 km)	200 yd (180 m)	Unknown	A tornado moved across rural areas of Daviess County, overturning a mobile home and causing minor damage to two modular homes.
EF2	N of Jameson	Daviess	MO	40.03°N 94.00°W	2022 – 2027	2.98 mi (4.80 km)	100 yd (91 m)	Unknown	A strong tornado struck a farmstead, where a small residential home had its roof completely removed and an outer wall partially destroyed. Several large barns and an outbuilding had metal siding removed as well. Elsewhere, a modular home was completely destroyed, with most of the debris being blown away.
EF0	S of Osceola	Clarke	IA	40.99°N 93.77°W	2041 - 2043	0.73 mi (1.17 km)	75 yd (69 m)	$50,000	A home lost a portion of its roof, a power pole was snapped, and a parked semi-trailer was overturned. The roof was torn off an old farm machinery building.
EF2	NE of Trenton to E of Spickard	Grundy	MO	40.10°N 93.66°W	2055 – 2115	12.84 mi (20.66 km)	500 yd (460 m)	Unknown	A strong tornado touched down in Crowder State Park and moved northeastward. Residences near Tindall sustained heavy damage. Other residences, mainly modular and mobile homes, were impacted with mostly minor damage along the path.

=== March 28 event ===
List of confirmed tornadoes – Friday, March 28, 2014
EF#	Location	County / Parish	State	Start Coord.	Time (UTC)	Path length	Max width	Damage	Summary
EF1	N of Ball	Rapides	LA	31.42°N 92.42°W	0223 – 0225	1.52 mi (2.45 km)	200 yd (180 m)	$100,000	Large trees fell on several houses and vehicles, damaging them.

=== March 29 event ===
List of confirmed tornadoes – Saturday, March 29, 2014
EF#	Location	County / Parish	State	Start Coord.	Time (UTC)	Path length	Max width	Damage	Summary
EF0	E of Lake Mary Jane	Orange	FL	28.39°N 81.13°W	1820 – 1823	2.43 mi (3,910 m)	100 yd (91 m)	Unknown	Three blocks of homes were impacted with minimal damage from tornadic winds. Additional damage to homes occurred from fallen trees.
EF0	E of Fuquay Varina	Wake	NC	35.59°N 78.69°W	0057 – 0058	0.18 mi (290 m)	145 yd (133 m)	$8,000	A home sustained substantial shingle damage, an outbuilding was picked up, moved about 50 yards (46 m) and destroyed, and several trees were downed.
EF0	S of Garner	Wake	NC	35.65°N 78.63°W	0108 – 0109	0.12 mi (190 m)	75 yd (69 m)	$5,000	A brief tornado impacted a home in a subdivision, with a couple broken windows and minor roof damage. A couple of trees were downed as well.
EF0	NNW of Nord	Butte	CA	39.84°N 121.97°W	0240 – 0241	0.01 mi (16 m)	10 yd (9.1 m)	$0	A spotter observed a brief tornado that uprooted a tree in an orchard.

=== March 31 event ===
List of confirmed tornadoes – Monday, March 31, 2014
EF#	Location	County / Parish	State	Start Coord.	Time (UTC)	Path length	Max width	Damage	Summary
EF0	SSW of Minneota to ESE of St. Leo	Lyon, Yellow Medicine	MN	44.55°N 95.99°W	2050 – 2114	10.67 mi (17.17 km)	100 yd (91 m)	$45,000	In Lyon County, the tornado damaged a grain bin, destroyed outbuildings, and broke the windows to a house. In Yellow Medicine County, the tornado damaged additional outbuildings, sheds, barns, and three houses.

== See also ==
- Tornadoes of 2014
- List of United States tornadoes from November to December 2013
- List of United States tornadoes from April to May 2014
