= Morehead City Historic District =

National Register Historic District in North Carolina, United States

- National Register of Historic Places Morehead City Historic District
- U.S. National Register of Historic Places
- U.S. Historic district
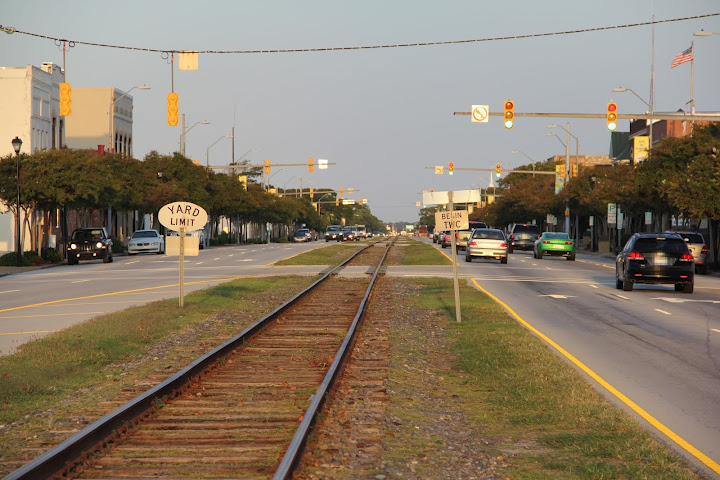
- Morehead City Historic District, September 2012

- Location within North Carolina Location within the United States
- Location: Roughly along Fisher St. and Bridges St., from N. 5th St. to N. 12th St., Morehead, North Carolina
- Coordinates: 34°43′21″N 76°42′51″W
- Area: 40 acres (16 ha)
- Built: 1857
- Architect: Atwood and Nash, Inc; et al.
- Architectural style: Colonial Revival, Queen Anne, et al.
- NRHP reference No.: 03000266
- Added to NRHP: April 18, 2003

In 2003, the US Department of Interior - National Park Service listed the National Register of Historic Places Morehead City Historic District (NRHD). It is located near the downtown waterfront of Morehead City, Carteret County, North Carolina. Within the NRHD boundary originally were 123 Contributing Resource (CR) buildings. (Eff. 01/01/2024, the current number remaining is unknown.)

In the oldest section of the small seaport town of Morehead City, the CR buildings predominantly date from about 1899 to 1930. They include notable examples of Queen Anne and Colonial Revival style architecture. Notable are the Dudley House (1857), First Methodist Church (rebuilt 1952), Franklin Memorial Methodist Church (1923), the First Baptist Church (1920s), and the First Freewill Baptist Church (1904, 1957).

In 2019, the Town of Morehead City demolished perhaps the most important CR historic property within the NRHD, the Charles S. Wallace Graded Public School, 1930). The National Register lists, "Gone."

(The National Register Morehead City Historic District often is confused with the Town of Morehead City's own "historic district." At issue may be NCGS § 160D-303(a), Historic preservation commission.)
