= Morehead City Municipal Building =

- U.S. National Register of Historic Places
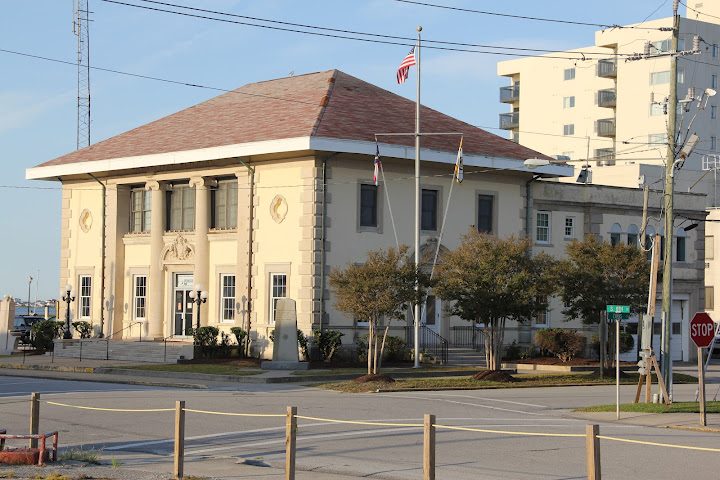
- Morehead City Municipal Building, September 2012

- Location within North Carolina Location within the United States
- Location: 202 S. Eighth St., Morehead City, North Carolina
- Coordinates: 34°43′13″N 76°42′48″W
- Area: less than one acre
- Built: 1926
- Built by: Jones Brothers
- Architect: Gladding, R.D.
- Architectural style: Renaissance
- NRHP reference No.: 04000828
- Added to NRHP: August 11, 2004

Morehead City Municipal Building is a historic municipal building located at Morehead City, Carteret County, North Carolina. It was built in 1926, and is a two-story, stuccoed brick building in the Florentine Renaissance style. It has a low hipped roof and an in-antis porch, with two stone, full height, engaged Ionic order columns. Also on the property are the contributing Fulford and Day Monument (1920), American Legion Monument (c. 1945), and Flagpole and Armistice Marker (c. 1945).

It was listed on the National Register of Historic Places in 2004.
