= List of United States tornadoes from August to October 2013 =

This is a list of all tornadoes that were confirmed by local offices of the National Weather Service in the United States from August to October 2013.

== August ==
Confirmed tornadoes by Enhanced Fujita rating
EFU	EF0	EF1	EF2	EF3	EF4	EF5	Total
0	34	11	1	0	0	0	46

=== August 1 event ===
List of confirmed tornadoes – Thursday, August 1, 2013 (Note: All dates are based on the local time zone where the tornado touched down; however, all times are in Coordinated Universal Time for consistency.)
EF#	Location	County / Parish	State	Start Coord.	Time (UTC)	Path length	Max width	Summary
EF1	E of Arlington	Duval	FL	30.3513°N 81.5124°W	2015 – 2025	1.93 mi (3.11 km)	100 yd (91 m)	Intermittent high-end EF1 damaged an apartment complex and 15 to 20 buildings, six of which were homes, and downed numerous trees. One person suffered minor injuries that were indirectly related to the tornado. The tornado was originally rated EF2, but was downgraded following post-storm analysis.
EF0	Lubbock Preston Smith International Airport (1st tornado)	Lubbock	TX	33.6621°N 101.8345°W	2142 – 2147	0.74 mi (1.19 km)	25 yd (23 m)	Landspout tornado caused no damage. This tornado occurred simultaneously with the following event.
EF0	Lubbock Preston Smith International Airport (2nd tornado)	Lubbock	TX	33.6804°N 101.8253°W	2146 – 2153	0.43 mi (690 m)	25 yd (23 m)	Brief landspout tornado that caused no damage. This tornado occurred simultaneously with the previous event.

=== August 3 event ===
List of confirmed tornadoes – Saturday, August 3, 2013
EF#	Location	County / Parish	State	Start Coord.	Time (UTC)	Path length	Max width	Summary
EF0	NNE of Fort Morgan	Morgan	CO	40.27°N 103.79°W	2000 – 2003	0.1 mi (160 m)	50 yd (46 m)	Brief tornado in an open field with no damage.
EF0	S of Last Chance	Washington	CO	39.61°N 103.58°W	2137	0.1 mi (160 m)	50 yd (46 m)	Brief tornado in an open field with no damage.
EF0	N of Genoa	Lincoln	CO	39.39°N 103.50°W	2207	0.1 mi (160 m)	50 yd (46 m)	Brief tornado in an open field with no damage.
EF0	SSE of Gates	Weld	CO	40.48°N 104.74°W	2217	0.1 mi (160 m)	50 yd (46 m)	Brief tornado caused minor damage.
EF0	NNE of Johnstown	Weld	CO	40.39°N 104.83°W	2229	0.1 mi (160 m)	50 yd (46 m)	Brief touchdown in an open field with no damage.
EF0	NNW of Keenesburg	Weld	CO	40.14°N 104.55°W	2324	0.1 mi (160 m)	50 yd (46 m)	Brief touchdown in an open field with no damage.
EF0	Erie	Weld	CO	40.0508°N 105.0506°W	2340	0.1 mi (160 m)	50 yd (46 m)	Brief tornado with no damage.
EF0	SE of Epsie	Powder River	MT	45.44°N 105.60°W	0115 – 0120	1 mi (1.6 km)	100 yd (91 m)	Tornado north of Post lofted debris into the air and was accompanied by large hail, which caused damage to the east of Epsie. No damage was reported directly with the tornado.

=== August 5 event ===
List of confirmed tornadoes – Monday, August 5, 2013
EF#	Location	County / Parish	State	Start Coord.	Time (UTC)	Path length	Max width	Summary
EF0	NNW of Edson	Sherman	KS	39.4503°N 101.6145°W	1828 – 1830	0.1 mi (160 m)	100 yd (91 m)	Lnadspout tornado remained over open country and caused no damage.
EF0	NE of Goodland Municipal Airport	Sherman	KS	39.4621°N 101.5808°W	1840 – 1842	0.1 mi (160 m)	100 yd (91 m)	Landspout tornado remained over open country and caused no damage.

=== August 6 event ===
List of confirmed tornadoes – Tuesday, August 6, 2013
EF#	Location	County / Parish	State	Start Coord.	Time (UTC)	Path length	Max width	Summary
EF0	NE of Chokio	Stevens	MN	45.6132°N 96.1356°W	2100 – 2101	0.09 mi (0.14 km)	10 yd (9.1 m)	Very brief tornado blew the door off of a milkhouse and caused other minor damage.
EF0	SW of Colfax	Richland	ND	46.47°N 97.02°W	2113 – 2114	0.5 mi (0.80 km)	100 yd (91 m)	Brief tornado observed by a farmer on a tractor quickly became engulfed in rain and hail and downed numerous trees before dissipating. Tree limbs were thrown into the tractor and nearby farm buildings, causing minor damage to everything that was impacted.
EF1	SW of Galchutt	Richland	ND	46.37°N 96.84°W	2126 – 2131	3 mi (4.8 km)	150 yd (140 m)	Intermittent rain and hail-wrapped tornado downed numerous trees, tossing some dozens of yards, as it crossed Interstate 29 at one point. Winds partially related to the tornado also threw hail into numerous farm fields, causing significant damage to the fields.
EF0	NNW of Hancock	Stevens	MN	45.5298°N 95.8175°W	2129 – 2130	0.09 mi (0.14 km)	10 yd (9.1 m)	A few trees were downed and dust was kicked into the air.
EF0	WNW of New London	Kandiyohi	MN	45.349°N 95.1572°W	2217 – 2218	0.17 mi (270 m)	30 yd (27 m)	Trees were downed, corn was damaged, and a heavy cap was lifted off of farm equipment.

=== August 7 event ===
List of confirmed tornadoes – Wednesday, August 7, 2013
EF#	Location	County / Parish	State	Start Coord.	Time (UTC)	Path length	Max width	Summary
EF1	NNE of Partridge Lake to WSW of Hortonville	Waupaca, Outagamie	WI	44.349°N 88.838°W	0522 – 0530	9.79 mi (15.76 km)	125 yd (114 m)	Several campers were blown over at a campground and about 100 trees were downed in Waupaca County before the tornado moved into Outagamie County south of New London, where it downed trees before merging with the following tornado near Hortonville. Two people were injured by this tornado at the campground in Waupaca County.
EF2	W of New London to Greenville	Waupaca, Outagamie	WI	44.383°N 88.774°W	0524 – 0533	13.07 mi (21.03 km)	175 yd (160 m)	Fast-moving tornado collapsed the roof of a church, causing the failure of two walls. Several homes were damaged as well (mostly to roof and siding), some due to fallen trees. Hundreds of trees were downed along the path.
EF1	E of Greenville to NNE of Brillion	Outagamie, Brown, Calumet	WI	44.298°N 88.46°W	0538 – 0552	20.69 mi (33.30 km)	175 yd (160 m)	Tornado caused roof damage to a shopping mall and roof and window damage to two small retail buildings, caused minor roof and siding damage to several houses, damaged numerous vehicles, and downed four wooden power poles and hundreds of trees while in Outagamie County. It moved briefly through Brown County near Holland, downing trees before moving into Calumet County, where it collapsed two metal truss towers and downed about three dozen trees before dissipating.
EF1	Mackville to W of Morrison	Outagamie, Brown	WI	44.345°N 88.415°W	0538 – 0553	19.15 mi (30.82 km)	175 yd (160 m)	Tornado touched down near Mackville and travelled east-southeast, collapsing a barn, removing part of the roof from a second barn, and heavily damaging a boat showroom. It then moved into Brown County southwest of Wrightstown, blowing in the door and removing the roof of an attached garage and collapsing the walls of an outbuilding. Many trees were downed.
EF1	ENE of Mackville to E of Maribel	Outagamie, Brown, Manitowoc	WI	44.371°N 88.374°W	0540 – 0610	33.1 mi (53.3 km)	250 yd (230 m)	Fast-moving long-tracked tornado caused significant damage to several outbuildings and barns, flattened corn fields, and damaged a power substation before crossing into Brown County northwest of Wrightstown. It knocked over two campers and about 50 trees at a campground, blew in two garage doors and ripped the roof of off a large garage, and damaged at least 70 homes, most of which were damaged by falling trees. It then moved into Manitowoc County, damaging several outbuildings and the roof of a barn, knocking over a 110-year-old stone structure, and downed hundreds of trees.
EF1	SW of Pilsen	Brown, Kewaunee	WI	44.42°N 87.78°W	0605 – 0610	5.57 mi (8.96 km)	100 yd (91 m)	A couple dozen trees were downed in Brown County southeast of Henrysville, before the tornado moved into Kewaunee County southwest of Pilsen. It collapsed the roof and walls of a barn, damaged the tops of two silos, and downed several dozen trees before dissipating southeast of Pilsen.
EF1	S of Orrville	Wayne	OH	40.81°N 81.800°W	1901 – 1903	0.87 mi (1.40 km)	50 yd (46 m)	A large portion of a home's roof was removed and blown into a field, crops were flattened, and numerous trees were downed.
EF0	N of Wolfforth	Lubbock	TX	33.529°N 102.02°W	2148 – 2149	0.01 mi (0.016 km)	10 yd (9.1 m)	Brief landspout tornado caused no damage.
EF0	SE of Ralphton	Somerset	PA	40.11°N 79.0075°W	2320 – 2321	0.22 mi (350 m)	75 yd (69 m)	A home sustained minor damage, a barn roof was partially blown off, and over two dozen trees were downed.
EF0	WSW of Turpin	Beaver	OK	36.8506°N 100.9385°W	0036 – 0042	0.11 mi (180 m)	25 yd (23 m)	A tornado remained very weak and stayed over open fields, causing no damage.

=== August 11 event ===
List of confirmed tornadoes – Sunday, August 11, 2013
EF#	Location	County / Parish	State	Start Coord.	Time (UTC)	Path length	Max width	Summary
EF1	S of Hill City	Pennington	SD	43.9041°N 103.5907°W	2028 – 2040	1.28 mi (2.06 km)	30 yd (27 m)	Shingles were torn off of two houses and several ponderosa pine trees were snapped, with some falling onto power lines and snapping the poles.

=== August 12 event ===
List of confirmed tornadoes – Monday, August 12, 2013
EF#	Location	County / Parish	State	Start Coord.	Time (UTC)	Path length	Max width	Summary
EF0	WSW of Alcova	Natrona	WY	42.5468°N 106.7685°W	1930 – 1932	0.09 mi (0.14 km)	10 yd (9.1 m)	Brief landspout tornado on the west shore of Alcova Reservoir was caught on camera. It stayed over open land and caused no damage.

=== August 13 event ===
List of confirmed tornadoes – Tuesday, August 13, 2013
EF#	Location	County / Parish	State	Start Coord.	Time (UTC)	Path length	Max width	Summary
EF0	SE of Bel Air	Harford	MD	39.516°N 76.265°E	1001 – 1002	1 mi (1.6 km)	75 yd (69 m)	Weak tornado downed numerous trees southwest of Calvary.
EF0	Manahawkin	Ocean	NJ	39.6849°N 74.2688°W	1405 – 1413	3.16 mi (5.09 km)	100 yd (91 m)	A Lighthouse Christian Academy building and the Manahawkin Baptist Church sustained roof and minor structural damage, a trailer was flipped, and a Moose Lodge was damaged. Numerous trees and power poles were downed as well, with one tree falling onto a house.
EF0	NNE of Healy	Lane	KS	38.6936°N 100.5624°W	1615 – 1617	0.04 mi (0.064 km)	25 yd (23 m)	Long, skinny tornado that caused no damage.

=== August 14 event ===
List of confirmed tornadoes – Wednesday, August 14, 2013
EF#	Location	County / Parish	State	Start Coord.	Time (UTC)	Path length	Max width	Summary
EF0	E of Stratford	Sherman	TX	36.34°N 101.82°W	2245 – 2248	1 mi (1.6 km)	50 yd (46 m)	Brief, weak tornado south-southwest of Texhoma that appeared as a dust whirl and caused no damage.
EF0	W of Pringle	Hutchinson	TX	35.95°N 101.57°W	2340 – 2341	0.11 mi (180 m)	40 yd (37 m)	Brief tornado with no damage.
EF0	N of Alley	Hale	TX	33.94°N 101.90°W	0358 – 0359	0.07 mi (0.11 km)	25 yd (23 m)	Very brief tornado damaged several center pivot irrigation systems.

=== August 18 event ===
List of confirmed tornadoes – Sunday, August 18, 2013
EF#	Location	County / Parish	State	Start Coord.	Time (UTC)	Path length	Max width	Summary
EF0	NNW of Apple Valley	San Bernardino	CA	34.7524°N 117.323°W	2100 – 2130	1.02 mi (1.64 km)	3 yd (2.7 m)	Very small landspout tornado near Helendale was caught on camera, but resulted in no damage.
EF1	NW of Ephesus	Heard	GA	33.4139°N 85.2835°W	2341 – 2342	0.4 mi (640 m)	15 yd (14 m)	Brief tornado caused roof damage to a mobile home, destroyed its porch, and downed dozens of trees.

=== August 21 event ===
List of confirmed tornadoes – Wednesday, August 21, 2013
EF#	Location	County / Parish	State	Start Coord.	Time (UTC)	Path length	Max width	Summary
EF0	NNE of Bateman	Chippewa	WI	44.9712°N 91.2342°W	2224 – 2226	1.2 mi (1.9 km)	25 yd (23 m)	A storm chaser videoed this tornado touching down northwest of Cadott. Two barns were heavily damaged and several trees were downed.

=== August 26 event ===
List of confirmed tornadoes – Monday, August 26, 2013
EF#	Location	County / Parish	State	Start Coord.	Time (UTC)	Path length	Max width	Summary
EF0	ESE of Bluffton	Otter Tail	MN	46.46°N 95.16°W	0115	0.1 mi (160 m)	50 yd (46 m)	Brief touchdown reported by a storm chaser northwest of Wadena with no damage.

=== August 27 event ===
List of confirmed tornadoes – Tuesday, August 27, 2013
EF#	Location	County / Parish	State	Start Coord.	Time (UTC)	Path length	Max width	Summary
EF0	Cohoctah Township	Livingston	MI	42.7444°N 83.984°W	0354 – 0358	1.6 mi (2.6 km)	420 yd (380 m)	Numerous trees were downed.
EF0	W of Brighton	Livingston	MI	42.5272°N 83.8347°W	0450 – 0455	2.97 mi (4.78 km)	700 yd (640 m)	Several homes sustained siding damage and numerous trees were downed.

=== August 29 event ===
List of confirmed tornadoes – Thursday, August 29, 2013
EF#	Location	County / Parish	State	Start Coord.	Time (UTC)	Path length	Max width	Summary
EF0	NNW of Remer to WSW of Hill City	Cass, Aitkin	MN	47.079°N 93.928°W	2328 – 2355	12.93 mi (20.81 km)	300 yd (270 m)	Many trees were downed, a few of which fell onto a house. A few small structures were damaged as well.

=== August 30 event ===
List of confirmed tornadoes – Friday, August 30, 2013
EF#	Location	County / Parish	State	Start Coord.	Time (UTC)	Path length	Max width	Summary
EF0	WSW of Folsom	Custer	SD	43.79°N 102.96°W	2144	0.01 mi (0.016 km)	10 yd (9.1 m)	Small, brief tornado in a pasture east of Hermosa caused no damage.
EF0	NW of New Salem	Morton	ND	46.8766°N 101.489°W	0010 – 0015	2.49 mi (4.01 km)	30 yd (27 m)	Tornado remained over open rural areas north of Interstate 94 and caused no damage.

=== August 31 event ===
List of confirmed tornadoes – Saturday, August 31, 2013
EF#	Location	County / Parish	State	Start Coord.	Time (UTC)	Path length	Max width	Summary
EF0	NE of Crystal	Pembina	ND	48.63°N 97.62°W	2105 – 2108	1 mi (1.6 km)	20 yd (18 m)	Intermittent tornado through dust into the air but caused no damage.

== September ==
Confirmed tornadoes by Enhanced Fujita rating
EFU	EF0	EF1	EF2	EF3	EF4	EF5	Total
0	15	5	1	0	0	0	21

=== September 1 event ===
List of confirmed tornadoes – Sunday, September 1, 2013
EF#	Location	County / Parish	State	Start Coord.	Time (UTC)	Path length	Max width	Summary
EF0	SE of Baconville	Franklin	MA	42.3305°N 72.3534°W	2225 – 2226	0.05 mi (0.080 km)	10 yd (9.1 m)	Brief waterspout skirted the shore but caused no damage.
EF0	NW of Serena	LaSalle	IL	41.5305°N 88.7745°W	2342 – 2347	1.63 mi (2.62 km)	50 yd (46 m)	Weak tornado with no known damage.

=== September 7 event ===
List of confirmed tornadoes – Saturday, September 7, 2013
EF#	Location	County / Parish	State	Start Coord.	Time (UTC)	Path length	Max width	Summary
EF0	ENE of American Fork	Utah	UT	40.3965°N 111.7631°W	2240 – 2245	0.1 mi (0.16 km)	3 yd (2.7 m)	Very small tornado removed the metal roof from a barn, damaged a few outbuildings, and downed a few trees.

=== September 10 event ===
List of confirmed tornadoes – Tuesday, September 10, 2013
EF#	Location	County / Parish	State	Start Coord.	Time (UTC)	Path length	Max width	Summary
EF0	NE of Shiprock	San Juan	NM	36.8054°N 108.6694°W	0545 – 0550	0.21 mi (0.34 km)	10 yd (9.1 m)	Brief tornado with no damage.

=== September 11 event ===
List of confirmed tornadoes – Wednesday, September 11, 2013
EF#	Location	County / Parish	State	Start Coord.	Time (UTC)	Path length	Max width	Summary
EF0	N of Baxter State Park	Piscataquis	ME	46.473°N 68.967°W	1948 – 1949	0.25 mi (0.40 km)	125 yd (114 m)	Brief tornado downed a few trees in far northeastern Piscataquis County.
EF0	NW of Williams to SSE of Graceton	Lake of the Woods	MN	48.7905°N 94.9811°W	2019 – 2036	9.34 mi (15.03 km)	30 yd (27 m)	Weak intermittent tornado downed a few trees.

=== September 12 event ===
List of confirmed tornadoes – Thursday, September 12, 2013
EF#	Location	County / Parish	State	Start Coord.	Time (UTC)	Path length	Max width	Summary
EF0	SW of Byesville	Guernsey	OH	39.9394°N 81.5940°W	2356 – 2357	0.2 mi (0.32 km)	50 yd (46 m)	Brief, weak tornado near Helena lifted the roof off a house and put it back on, destroyed a shed and a chicken coop, and downed numerous trees.

=== September 15 event ===
List of confirmed tornadoes – Sunday, September 15, 2013
EF#	Location	County / Parish	State	Start Coord.	Time (UTC)	Path length	Max width	Summary
EF0	SW of Eden	Sweetwater	WY	41.8658°N 109.6777°W	2311	0.05 mi (0.080 km)	30 yd (27 m)	Brief tornado remained over open country and caused no damage.

=== September 16 event ===
List of confirmed tornadoes – Monday, September 16, 2013
EF#	Location	County / Parish	State	Start Coord.	Time (UTC)	Path length	Max width	Summary
EF0	SW of Highland Beach	Palm Beach	FL	26.399°N 80.0774°W	1510 – 1511	0.07 mi (0.11 km)	10 yd (9.1 m)	Very brief and weak tornado north of Boca Raton downed a couple trees and damaged fences and outdoor furniture at two residences.

=== September 17 event ===
List of confirmed tornadoes – Tuesday, September 17, 2013
EF#	Location	County / Parish	State	Start Coord.	Time (UTC)	Path length	Max width	Summary
EF0	NNW of St. Anthony	Fremont	ID	44.1037°N 111.757°W	2045 – 2055	0.5 mi (0.80 km)	10 yd (9.1 m)	Tornado observed by the public over open county northeast of Hamer caused no damage.
EF0	ESE of Dubois	Clark	ID	44.1423°N 112.1368°W	2047 – 2057	0.5 mi (0.80 km)	10 yd (9.1 m)	Rope tornado lifted ground debris but caused no damage.

=== September 18 event ===
List of confirmed tornadoes – Wednesday, September 18, 2013
EF#	Location	County / Parish	State	Start Coord.	Time (UTC)	Path length	Max width	Summary
EF0	S of Farmington	San Juan	NM	36.6505°N 108.2109°W	1944 – 1949	0.15 mi (0.24 km)	20 yd (18 m)	Well-defined gustnado spun up into a landspout tornado but caused no damage.

=== September 20 event ===
List of confirmed tornadoes – Friday, September 20, 2013
EF#	Location	County / Parish	State	Start Coord.	Time (UTC)	Path length	Max width	Summary
EF0	ENE of Renova	Sunflower	MS	33.8159°N 90.6347°W	0024 – 0025	0.42 mi (0.68 km)	100 yd (91 m)	Brief tornado caused minor damage to a house, a shed, and a carport, damaged a church sign, and downed several trees.
EF0	S of White Oak	Simpson	MS	32.0052°N 89.6984°W	0257 – 0305	3.23 mi (5.20 km)	50 yd (46 m)	Tornado just inside Simpson County (northeast of Martinsville) downed several trees.
EF2	Kingston	Adams	MS	31.398°N 91.29°W	0430 – 0433	1.21 mi (1.95 km)	200 yd (180 m)	Two homes were damaged, including losing large portions of their roofs. Debris was blown away and found downstream of the houses.
EF1	E of Cranfield	Adams	MS	31.5499°N 91.168°W	0454 – 0456	0.32 mi (0.51 km)	200 yd (180 m)	Brief tornado downed a couple dozen trees.

=== September 21 event ===
List of confirmed tornadoes – Saturday, September 21, 2013
EF#	Location	County / Parish	State	Start Coord.	Time (UTC)	Path length	Max width	Summary
EF1	W of Polkville	Rankin	MS	32.20°N 89.79°W	0753 – 0754	0.98 mi (1.58 km)	100 yd (91 m)	A chicken house was destroyed, another was heavily damaged, and a tree was snapped.
EF1	WNW of Pineville	Smith	MS	32.1527°N 89.4518°W	0833 – 0835	0.73 mi (1.17 km)	50 yd (46 m)	A chicken house, a hay barn, and a trailer were damaged.
EF1	SW of King	Stokes	NC	36.2626°N 80.3776°W	2158 – 2200	0.53 mi (0.85 km)	90 yd (82 m)	A sunroom at a house had its exterior walls knocked down, a barn was completely destroyed, and a garage door at an industrial outbuilding was damaged. Many trees were downed as well.

=== September 22 event ===
List of confirmed tornadoes – Sunday, September 22, 2013
EF#	Location	County / Parish	State	Start Coord.	Time (UTC)	Path length	Max width	Summary
EF0	NW of Holden Beach	Brunswick	NC	33.9298°N 78.2779°W	0839 – 0840	0.21 mi (0.34 km)	20 yd (18 m)	Brief, weak tornado downed several trees, a few of which fell onto a home, lifted a screened-in porch from its foundation, and threw two pump houses into a home before lifting over a pond.

=== September 30 event ===
List of confirmed tornadoes – Monday, September 30, 2013
EF#	Location	County / Parish	State	Start Coord.	Time (UTC)	Path length	Max width	Summary
EF1	S of Frederickson	Pierce	WA	47.0847°N 122.3607°W	1420 – 1424	1 mi (1.6 km)	75 yd (69 m)	Part of the roof was torn off of a building, several empty railway boxcars were blown over, a tower, several lamp posts, and over two dozen trees were downed, and about a dozen vehicles were damaged.

== October ==
Confirmed tornadoes by Enhanced Fujita rating
EFU	EF0	EF1	EF2	EF3	EF4	EF5	Total
0	26	27	4	1	2	0	60

=== October 1 event ===
List of confirmed tornadoes – Tuesday, October 1, 2013
EF#	Location	County / Parish	State	Start Coord.	Time (UTC)	Path length	Max width	Summary
EF0	Aguada	Aguada	PR	18.3349°N 67.1876°W	1843 – 1846	0.3 mi (0.48 km)	10 yd (9.1 m)	Brief tornado just east of Rincón caused structural damage to homes and shelters, overturned cargo trailers, and downed trees and power lines.

=== October 3 event ===
List of confirmed tornadoes – Thursday, October 3, 2013
EF#	Location	County / Parish	State	Start Coord.	Time (UTC)	Path length	Max width	Summary
EF2	SW of Hickman to N of Palmyra	Lancaster, Otoe	NE	40.6827°N 96.4637°W	0308 – 0339	16.5 mi (26.6 km)	300 yd (270 m)	Two homes lost large portions of their roofs, and others sustained lesser damage. Trees were downed, and three storage buildings were destroyed. Outbuildings were destroyed and vehicles were moved as well.
EF0	SE of Elmwood	Cass	NE	40.7834°N 96.2938°W	0355 – 0409	4.46 mi (7.18 km)	100 yd (91 m)	Tornado touched down south-southwest of Elmwood and moved mostly over open country before lifting east of town. A few trees were downed.

=== October 4 event ===
List of confirmed tornadoes – Friday, October 4, 2013
EF#	Location	County / Parish	State	Start Coord.	Time (UTC)	Path length	Max width	Summary
EF0	E of Madison	Stanton	NE	41.8682°N 97.3351°W	2132 – 2142	4.71 mi (7.58 km)	100 yd (91 m)	No damage was reported with this tornado as it moved through rural areas southwest of Stanton.
EF2	E of Royal	Antelope	NE	42.246°N 98.092°W	2148 – 2201	6.64 mi (10.69 km)	264 yd (241 m)	A strong tornado touched down south-southeast of Royal and ended just to the east-northeast of town. Several farmsteads were damaged (with outbuildings being the primary structures impacted) and numerous trees and power lines were downed.
EF4	SW of Wayne to NNW of Wakefield	Wayne, Dixon	NE	42.128°N 97.077°W	2212 – 2253	18.94 mi (30.48 km)	2,394 yd (2,189 m)	See article on this tornado – Fifteen people were injured; caused $50.5 million in damage. This became the first F4/EF4 tornado in October in the US since the Windsor Locks, Connecticut tornado of 1979, and the first tornado in Nebraska in October since 2001.
EF3	SSE of Creighton to N of Bazile Mills	Antelope, Knox	NE	42.4339°N 97.8817°W	2220 – 2236	6.43 mi (10.35 km)	590 yd (540 m)	This intense tornado touched down just inside Antelope County (to the south-southeast of Creighton) before moving north and into Knox County, where it dissipated 4 miles (6.4 km) north of Creighton. It was initially weak with damage confined to irrigation systems, siding, and shingles. The tornado then strengthened and completely destroyed a building that housed antique Trackers (scattering rubble for the equivalent of three city blocks) before hitting the Creighton Municipal Airport, where several buildings were either heavily damaged or destroyed, including three hangars receiving roof, garage, and siding damage and a storage building losing its roof. The airport beacon was blown away as well. The tornado then took a track to the northwest, where a 10,000-bushel grain bin was completely destroyed, and five more irrigation systems where destroyed. Many trees were downed, and power poles snapped at their base as well.
EF2	SW of Macy, NE to E of Bronson, IA	Thurston (NE), Monona (IA), Woodbury (IA)	NE, IA	42.0805°N 96.3861°W	2255 – 2347	25.62 mi (41.23 km)	250 yd (230 m)	This long-tracked, strong tornado began southwest of Macy before moving through the town. Six homes in the town were either heavily damaged or destroyed, while twelve more homes and one business sustained minor damage. Numerous vehicles, a center pivot irrigation system, and several buildings at farmsteads were damaged as well. The tornado crossed the Missouri River into Iowa west-northwest of Whiting and continued north-northeastward to the west of Sloan, where it spawned the EF1 satellite tornado listed below. Two buildings were destroyed southeast of Salix and open-air buildings were severely damaged at a dairy farm east of Salix. Other homes and buildings were either severely damaged or destroyed between Salix and Bronson before the tornado lifted just east of Bronson. Many trees and four power poles were downed, and corn crops were flattened along the path. Two people were injured, both in Thurston County.
EF0	ESE of Allen	Dixon	NE	42.3941°N 96.7337°W	2259 – 2301	0.68 mi (1.09 km)	50 yd (46 m)	A brief tornado caused no damage.
EF1	W of Sloan	Woodbury	IA	42.2206°N 96.2633°W	2317 – 2320	1.17 mi (1.88 km)	100 yd (91 m)	This was a satellite tornado to the long-tracked EF2 tornado listed above. Trees were downed and farm buildings were either damaged or destroyed.
EF1	NNW of Jackson, NE to SSE of Jefferson, SD	Dakota (NE), Union (SD)	NE, SD	42.4918°N 96.59°W	2325 – 2335	5.89 mi (9.48 km)	400 yd (370 m)	A tornado touched down in Dakota County, causing no damage before crossing the Missouri River into South Dakota. It then damaged homes, overturned an irrigation system, and downed many trees in a subdivision west of McCook Lake before dissipating. One of the homes had a collapsed chimney, carport, porch roof, and walls of a garage, and at least four other houses had roof, siding, and/or gutter damage.
EF1	NE of Jefferson, SD	Union (SD), Plymouth (IA)	SD, IA	42.570°N 96.5562°W	2335 – 2345	6.47 mi (10.41 km)	800 yd (730 m)	This tornado touched down south of Jefferson just after the previous tornado lifted, damaging a feedlot before crossing I-29. The roof and gutters of a house and the walls and roof of at least two storage equipment buildings were severely damaged, a road sign was damaged, several grain bins were either blown over or crushed, trees and power poles were downed, and corn crops were flattened. One of the grain bins was wrapped around a house, causing damage to the roof, siding, and gutters of the house. The tornado tracked in total for 3 miles (4.8 km) in South Dakota before crossing the Big Sioux River into Plymouth County, Iowa and lifting 5 miles (8.0 km) northeast of Jefferson after causing no damage.
EF4	SW of Climbing Hill to W of Washta	Woodbury, Cherokee	IA	42.3319°N 96.1086°W	2335 – 0017	24.94 mi (40.14 km)	2,600 yd (2,400 m)	This very large, violent tornado tracked northeast through rural Woodbury and Cherokee counties, moving west and north of Climbing Hill, southeast of Moville and Pierson, and northwest of Correctionville before dissipating west of Washta. Numerous houses were either heavily damaged or destroyed, with some losing their entire roofs, having collapse of walls, and being shifted off of their foundations. Many sheds, outbuildings, barns, silos, pieces of farm equipment, and garages were destroyed, and a car was thrown 30 feet (9.1 m). Farm equipment was tossed about 400 yards (370 m) at a farmstead south of Pierson, including a large grain cart that put gouges in a road and had its axle and wheels broken off, and many trees and power lines were downed along the path.
EF1	NW of Hinton	Plymouth	IA	42.6758°N 96.4453°W	2350 – 2352	1.11 mi (1.79 km)	100 yd (91 m)	Farm buildings were damaged, and trees were downed.
EF0	E of Adaville	Plymouth	IA	42.7464°N 96.3815°W	2355 – 2356	1.28 mi (2.06 km)	50 yd (46 m)	A brief tornado downed several trees.
EF0	NNE of Quimby	Cherokee	IA	42.6879°N 95.622°W	0041 – 0043	0.55 mi (0.89 km)	50 yd (46 m)	A brief tornado caused no damage.
EF0	SW of Cherokee	Cherokee	IA	42.7167°N 95.5901°W	0046 – 0047	0.4 mi (640 m)	50 yd (46 m)	A brief tornado caused no damage.
EF0	NE of Cherokee	Cherokee	IA	42.836°N 95.3967°W	0118 – 0119	0.34 mi (550 m)	50 yd (46 m)	A brief tornado to the east-southeast of Larrabee caused no damage.
EF1	SSW of Alta	Buena Vista	IA	42.6032°N 95.3649°W	0133 – 0142	5.45 mi (8.77 km)	200 yd (180 m)	This tornado touched down 5 miles (8.0 km) south-southwest of Alta and ended just outside the south side of town. A few farmsteads were damaged, with a drive-thru garage and several outbuildings suffering significant damage at one farmstead, farm equipment being damaged, a school suffering roof and air conditioning damage, and a baseball complex sustaining considerable damage, including to bleachers.
EF0	NW of Webb	Clay	IA	42.978°N 95.0574°W	0147 – 0148	0.71 mi (1.14 km)	100 yd (91 m)	A brief tornado to the south-southwest of Gillett Grove downed a few trees.

=== October 5 event ===
List of confirmed tornadoes – Saturday, October 5, 2013
EF#	Location	County / Parish	State	Start Coord.	Time (UTC)	Path length	Max width	Summary
EF0	W of Endeavor	Marquette	WI	43.70°N 89.477°W	2323 – 2330	1.78 mi (2.86 km)	50 yd (46 m)	Numerous trees were snapped along this tornado's path, including one the fell on and destroyed a vehicle and damaged the roof of a house. Other homes had shingle damage, and a section of metal was peeled off of the roof of a farmhouse. Corn crops were downed, a farm building was damaged, and a boat was moved as well.
EF0	SW of Obion	Obion	TN	36.2344°N 89.2485°W	2352 – 2353	0.18 mi (0.29 km)	25 yd (23 m)	A brief tornado in an open field just north of the Obion River caused no damage.

=== October 7 event ===
List of confirmed tornadoes – Monday, October 7, 2013
EF#	Location	County / Parish	State	Start Coord.	Time (UTC)	Path length	Max width	Summary
EF1	Paramus	Bergen	NJ	40.9317°N 74.0926°W	1916 – 1918	1.25 mi (2.01 km)	100 yd (91 m)	Trees were downed in George Washington Memorial Park (a cemetery) and across adjoining golf courses – the Paramus Golf Course and the Ridgewood Country Club.

=== October 8 event ===
List of confirmed tornadoes – Tuesday, October 8, 2013
EF#	Location	County / Parish	State	Start Coord.	Time (UTC)	Path length	Max width	Summary
EF0	MacDill Air Force Base	Hillsborough	FL	27.8309°N 82.5168°W	1924 – 1926	0.25 mi (0.40 km)	30 yd (27 m)	A pilot and the weather observer at MacDill Air Force Base observed a waterspout over Tampa Bay that caused no damage.

=== October 11 event ===
List of confirmed tornadoes – Friday, October 11, 2013
EF#	Location	County / Parish	State	Start Coord.	Time (UTC)	Path length	Max width	Summary
EF1	NE of Dumont	Traverse	MN	45.8177°N 96.2716°W	2225 – 2230	0.43 mi (0.69 km)	70 yd (64 m)	Many trees were downed with this brief tornado to the south of Charlesville, three of which fell on a house and broke a window, and a power pole fell across two vehicles. Siding, insulation, gutters, and shingles were torn from the same house that the tree fell on, and a barn was lifted off of its foundation and had all four walls destroyed, with tin siding being blown 50 yards (46 m) away. One piece of tin was impaled 8 inches (20 cm) into the ground and was standing upright. The tornado then moved into a corn field and dissipated.

=== October 12 event ===
List of confirmed tornadoes – Saturday, October 12, 2013
EF#	Location	County / Parish	State	Start Coord.	Time (UTC)	Path length	Max width	Summary
EF0	E of Sanger	Denton	TX	33.359°N 97.0985°W	1935 – 1940	0.01 mi (0.016 km)	20 yd (18 m)	Brief landspout tornado that was caught on camera caused no damage.

=== October 18 event ===
List of confirmed tornadoes – Friday, October 18, 2013
EF#	Location	County / Parish	State	Start Coord.	Time (UTC)	Path length	Max width	Summary
EF0	ENE of Kingsville	Kleberg	TX	27.54°N 97.77°W	2351 – 2352	0.2 mi (0.32 km)	25 yd (23 m)	Brief, weak landspout tornado that moved over an open field and caused no damage.

=== October 21 event ===
List of confirmed tornadoes – Monday, October 21, 2013
EF#	Location	County / Parish	State	Start Coord.	Time (UTC)	Path length	Max width	Summary
EF0	S of Naval Air Station Kingsville	Kleberg	TX	27.4276°N 97.8°W	2208 – 2209	0.18 mi (0.29 km)	25 yd (23 m)	Brief tornado east of Ricardo that lifted debris but caused no damage.

=== October 31 event ===
List of confirmed tornadoes – Thursday, October 31, 2013
EF#	Location	County / Parish	State	Start Coord.	Time (UTC)	Path length	Max width	Summary
EF1	S of Jasper	Jasper	TX	30.8447°N 93.9826°W	1200 – 1202	1.26 mi (2.03 km)	50 yd (46 m)	Several large pine trees were snapped, some of which landed on houses and buildings on a ranch. A large building was pushed 25 feet (7.6 m) off its pilings as well.
EF1	NW of Bridge City to W of West Orange	Orange	TX	30.039°N 93.871°W	1439 – 1447	5.93 mi (9.54 km)	200 yd (180 m)	At least a dozen homes suffered minor roof and siding damage, several garages, carports, and storage sheds were damaged, and many trees were downed.
EF1	SSE of DeQuincy	Calcasieu	LA	30.343°N 93.442°W	1446 – 1454	7.12 mi (11.46 km)	150 yd (140 m)	Many trees were downed, a fence was destroyed, and sheet metal roofing was removed from an outbuilding.
EF0	SSW of Ragley	Beauregard	LA	30.4829°N 93.2413°W	1500 – 1502	2.48 mi (3.99 km)	75 yd (69 m)	Weak tornado downed several trees.
EF1	S of Ragley	Beauregard	LA	30.4171°N 93.2437°W	1500 – 1510	7.89 mi (12.70 km)	150 yd (140 m)	Tornado moved from southwest of Ragley to east-southeast of town. Many trees were downed, with some falling onto homes and causing roof damage. Several homes and other structures sustained awning and gutter damage, and sheds were destroyed.
EF0	WSW of Reeves	Allen	LA	30.515°N 93.0837°W	1514 – 1515	0.82 mi (1.32 km)	75 yd (69 m)	Several trees were downed by this brief tornado.
EF0	NW of Lake Charles Regional Airport	Calcasieu	LA	30.1595°N 93.2959°W	1530 – 1534	1.39 mi (2.24 km)	30 yd (27 m)	Several trees were downed, the deck of a home suffered minor damage, and two sheds were collapsed and destroyed.
EF0	Easton	Evangeline	LA	30.751°N 92.4289°W	1621 – 1622	0.49 mi (0.79 km)	75 yd (69 m)	Tornado occurred in the eastern part of town and downed several trees.
EF0	NW of Evangeline	Acadia	LA	30.2833°N 92.5934°W	1641 – 1642	0.5 mi (0.80 km)	70 yd (64 m)	Brief tornado downed a few trees, with one falling on an above-ground swimming pool.
EF1	S of Oxly	Ripley	MO	36.5862°N 90.7416°W	2311 – 2319	4.16 mi (6.69 km)	150 yd (140 m)	An attached carport was torn from a home, another home had the roof deck lifted, damaging much of the interior walls, and several other homes received minor shingle damage. Debris was impaled up to 2 feet (0.61 m) in the ground, many trees were downed, and cattle were either killed or injured.
EF1	S of Harviell	Butler	MO	36.6338°N 90.47°W	2330 – 2331	0.22 mi (0.35 km)	50 yd (46 m)	A carport and a large wood-framed mechanic shed were destroyed, and several trees were downed.
EF1	N of Broseley	Butler	MO	36.6954°N 90.2691°W	2348 – 2355	5.7 mi (9.2 km)	75 yd (69 m)	A mobile home and a center pivot irrigation system were overturned, two homes sustained roof damage, and several trees were downed.
EF1	Leopold	Bollinger	MO	37.25°N 89.9482°W	2354 – 2356	1.5 mi (2.4 km)	200 yd (180 m)	Dozens of trees were downed, one of which damaged a pavilion, and shingles were blown off of a few homes.
EF1	NW of Bernie to SE of Essex	Stoddard	MO	36.7312°N 90.0338°W	0002 – 0021	14.25 mi (22.93 km)	100 yd (91 m)	Several outbuildings were either damaged or destroyed, a silo was destroyed, a grain building was dented, and a house had bricks removed and windows blown out. Cotton from bales was lofted and tossed into nearby trees, several trees were downed, and part of a bean field was flattened.
EF1	N of Dutchtown	Cape Girardeau	MO	37.2807°N 89.7086°W	0005 – 0009	3.9 mi (6.3 km)	150 yd (140 m)	A house was shifted off of its foundation while the roof itself was lifted off and slightly shifted. One barn was leveled, several other barns sustained roof damage, and numerous trees and power lines were downed, a few of which caused roof damage to two homes.
EF0	East Cape Girardeau	Alexander	IL	37.2956°N 89.5108°W	0020 – 0022	1.24 mi (2.00 km)	200 yd (180 m)	Several homes suffered mostly minor shingle damage, a church's steeple was blown off, and fencing and small sheds were damaged. Numerous trees were downed as well.
EF2	SW of Baker	Stoddard	MO	36.7332°N 89.85°W	0024 – 0027	1.93 mi (3.11 km)	100 yd (91 m)	Three sheds and four grain bins were leveled, with debris scattered for hundreds of yards, farm equipment was overturned, and brick was removed from one side of a home. Two other homes sustained roof damage, and several large trees were snapped as well.
EF1	N of Tamms to NE of Wetaug	Alexander, Pulaski	IL	37.3168°N 89.27°W	0035 – 0043	6.51 mi (10.48 km)	50 yd (46 m)	Many trees were downed.
EF1	Caraway	Craighead	AR	35.7476°N 90.3763°W	0037 – 0042	3.69 mi (5.94 km)	300 yd (270 m)	Tornado caused significant structural damage to the roofs of many homes, businesses, and churches and downed several dozen trees as it moved straight through town before lifting.
EF1	SSW of Sikeston	New Madrid	MO	36.8079°N 89.6258°W	0040 – 0044	2.99 mi (4.81 km)	50 yd (46 m)	One metal building was destroyed, and another had doors blown either in or out, as well as siding damage. Two grain augers were blown over, and several grain pipes ranging from 3 to 16 inches (7.6 to 40.6 cm) were blown around, with two blown across U.S. 62, one of which impaled a passing vehicle, shattering a window. Two power poles were snapped and metal fencing was pushed over as well.
EF1	S of Creal Springs to E of Stonefort	Williamson, Saline	IL	37.6055°N 88.83°W	0051 – 0104	9.9 mi (15.9 km)	175 yd (160 m)	Six barns and six homes were damaged, and numerous trees and power lines were downed.
EF1	NW of Belknap	Johnson	IL	37.3321°N 88.9701°W	0056 – 0058	0.7 mi (1.1 km)	50 yd (46 m)	A barn and three homes suffered varying degrees of roof damage, and several trees were downed.
EF1	Southern Wyatt, MO to S of Wickliffe, KY	Mississippi (MO), Ballard (KY)	MO, KY	36.92°N 89.22°W	0105 – 0115	7.62 mi (12.26 km)	200 yd (180 m)	Homes sustained roof damage and a concrete building was heavily damaged on the south side of Wyatt. The roof of a large pole barn was destroyed, many trees were downed, and bean fields sustained wind damage. The tornado crossed the Mississippi River, where it downed more trees and a power pole near the NewPage Paper Mill just south of Wickliffe.
EF1	SSW of Cunningham to E of Lovelaceville	Carlisle, McCracken	KY	36.9038°N 88.8899°W	0125 – 0135	8.26 mi (13.29 km)	200 yd (180 m)	A home's glass door was shattered, and that home and two surrounding homes had roof and siding damage. Several other homes had mostly minor shingle damage, although one's garage door was blown in, two sheds were destroyed, a large well-built barn sustained partial roof loss, a mobile home was blown off of its foundation, and a second mobile home was flipped over. Many trees were downed, bean fields were flattened, and an amateur radio tower was bent over as well.
EF0	SW of Gage	Ballard	KY	36.9605°N 88.9358°W	0130 – 0131	0.22 mi (0.35 km)	70 yd (64 m)	A mobile home was moved off of its foundation, and many trees were snapped to the northeast of Blandville.
EF1	ESE of Melber to SSE of St. Johns	McCracken	KY	36.9447°N 88.7089°W	0139 – 0143	2.15 mi (3.46 km)	225 yd (206 m)	One home's garage was blown in, porch was lifted up and damaged, and sheetrock walls were damaged. Several other homes had shingle, siding, gutter, and soffit damage, a camper was blown over, and numerous trees and bushes were downed as well.
EF0	SSE of Reidland	McCracken	KY	36.9773°N 88.5156°W	0148 – 0149	0.98 mi (1.58 km)	40 yd (37 m)	Several trees were downed and the roof of a porch was removed.
EF1	Reidland	McCracken	KY	37.0251°N 88.543°W	0150 – 0151	0.45 mi (0.72 km)	40 yd (37 m)	Several homes suffered roof damage, and numerous hardwood trees and tree branches that were about 1 foot (0.30 m) in diameter were downed.
EF0	Southern Calvert City	Marshall	KY	37.0026°N 88.3491°W	0203 – 0204	0.5 mi (0.80 km)	50 yd (46 m)	Metal roofing was removed from about two-thirds of a small strip mall, and other structures sustained minor damage. A few trees were downed as well.
EF1	Vandalia	Montgomery	OH	39.8929°N 84.1861°W	0330 – 0331	0.58 mi (0.93 km)	50 yd (46 m)	A large cinderblock drive-thru store collapsed, an uninhabited commercial building had its roof and part of its cinderblock wall destroyed and large plate glass windows blown in, and a nearby business sustained significant roof damage. A small restaurant had glass windows blown in and significant roof and facade damage. In the restaurant parking lot, numerous vehicles had windows blown out and some of the vehicles had been shifted/moved from their original location. A large pickup truck was lifted and tossed, landing on top of another vehicle. Three homes sustained major damage, and many others were affected. Some homes had partial wall collapse and loss of more than half of the roof, while others had holes in the roof and siding damage due to being impaled by trees and other debris. Several sheds were damaged as well. Debris from this area was carried over a block away. Numerous trees were downed along the path. Eight people were injured by the broken glass windows in the restaurant.
EF0	NW of St. Paris	Miami	OH	40.1818°N 84.0324°W	0338 – 0339	0.3 mi (0.48 km)	30 yd (27 m)	Brief, weak tornado north of Lena destroyed a barn, with debris being strewn around and the roof being lifted and deposited in a nearby tree, and heavily damaged a second barn, with mud being splattered on both of them. Many corn stalks were heavily damaged, and a large tree was split as well.
EF0	Southern Columbus	Franklin	OH	39.8778°N 82.9965°W	0440 – 0441	0.27 mi (0.43 km)	50 yd (46 m)	Brief tornado moved through a mobile home community, destroying three of them, causing major damage to four more, and causing minor damage to 23 others. The damage included roofs being partially removed, and the mobile homes being slightly shifted off of their foundations.

== See also ==
- Tornadoes of 2013
- List of United States tornadoes from June to July 2013
- List of United States tornadoes from November to December 2013
