= Carteret Health Care =

Coordinates: 34.7262°N 76.7550°W

Geography
- Location: Morehead City, North Carolina, North Carolina, United States

Organization
- Type: Non-profit
- Affiliated university: None

Services
- Beds: 135 inpatient, 13 Emergency Department Beds, 6 Express Care beds, and 5 CEU rooms.

History
- Founded: 1967

Links
- Website: http://www.carterethealth.org/
- Lists: Hospitals in North Carolina

Carteret Health Care (formerly Carteret General Hospital) is a 135-bed, non-profit hospital in Morehead City, North Carolina. Carteret General was founded in 1967.

== Hospitalist Program ==
Most general medical patients are admitted through the emergency department (ED) by the "Hospitalist" Physicians group. The doctors are in the hospital 24 hours per day and 7 days per week. They work 12-hour shifts to ensure continuity of care but also aim to prevent excessive physician fatigue. Patients who have experienced admission through the hospitalist group generally give the idea rave reviews.

== Equipment ==
The hospital began upgrading to new beds that are designed for comfort and safety in 2003. All the beds are now computerized, with special capabilities such as being able to weigh the patient in bed and alleviate pressure points. Safety engineering features such as low bed height and a patient position monitor that alerts staff when a patient is moving in and out of bed has reduced the likelihood of falls. For the 2003 upgrade, standard beds costs approximately $8,000, while high-end beds for the intensive care and surgical units cost between $17,000 and $23,000.

A remote control InTouch Health RP-7 robot named Riley was purchased in 2011. It allows staff members and patients almost immediate access to stroke experts at Wake Forest University Baptist Medical Center. The robot has two-way live video chat capabilities which allows physicians to remotely diagnose strokes and quickly develop care plans.
