= Newport River =

River in North Carolina, United States

Coordinates: 34.7877°N 76.8666°W

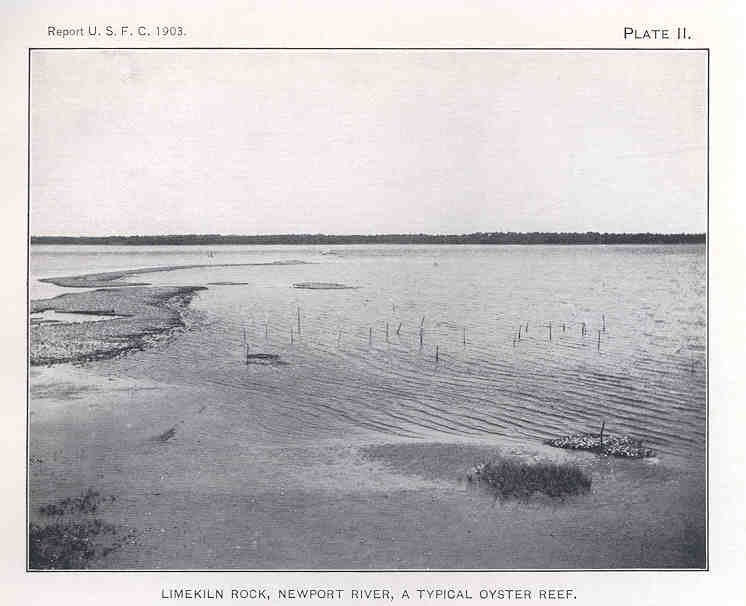
Early 20th Century photograph of oyster beds on the Newport River

The Newport River is a small river in North Carolina that runs approximately twelve miles (twenty kilometers) southeast through the town of Newport with its mouth opening into Bogue Sound, between Morehead City and Beaufort. It is popular for flatwater paddling and canoeing.
