= Morehead City, North Carolina =

- City
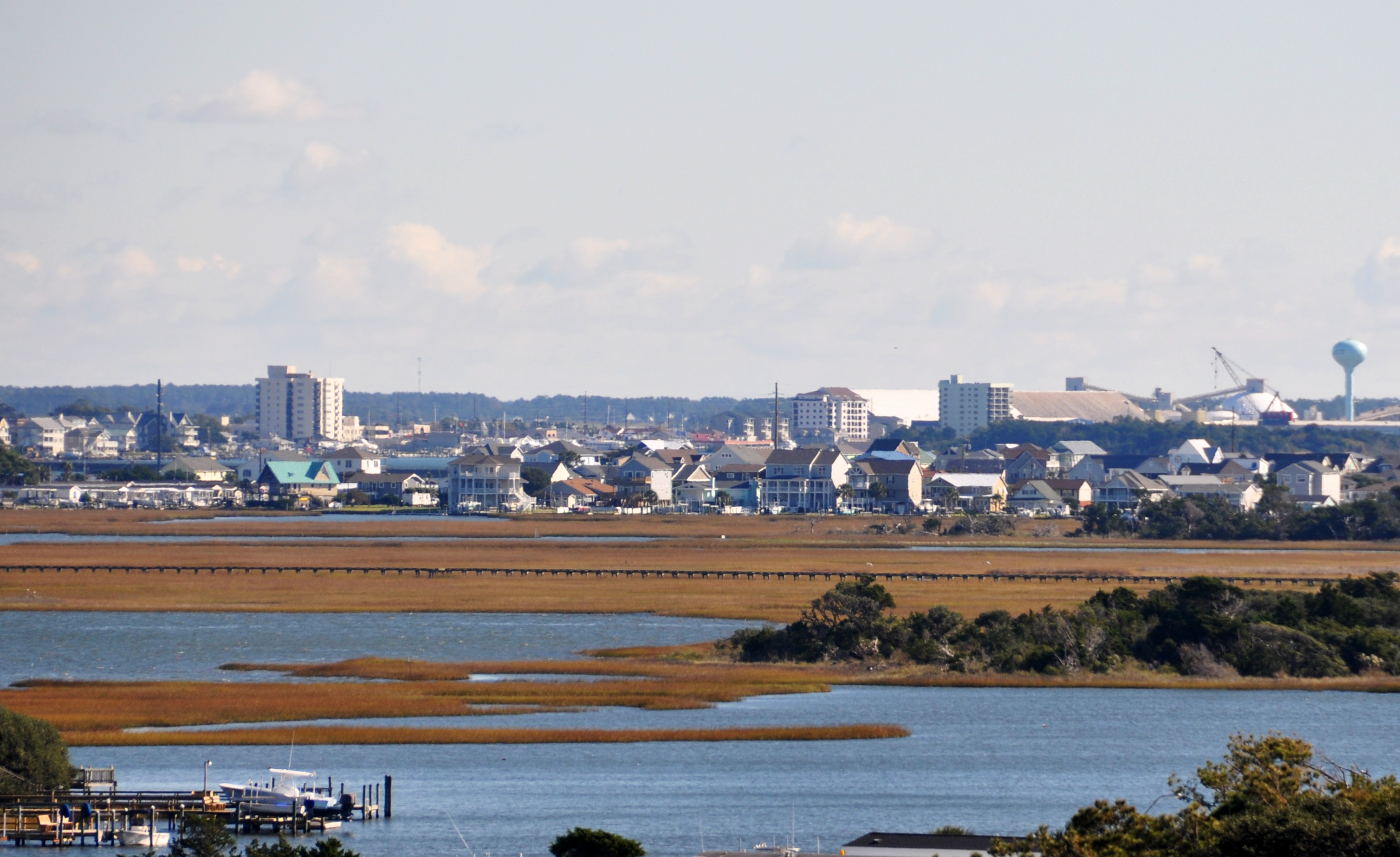
- Morehead City skyline

- Flag Seal

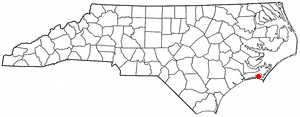
- Location of Morehead City, North Carolina
- Coordinates: 34°43′49″N 76°44′21″W
- Country: United States
- State: North Carolina
- County: Carteret

Government
  - Mayor: Lee Anthony Stiles
  - City Manager: Randy Martin
  - City Council: Richard Abell; George W. Ballou; William F. Taylor; Harvey Walker; Nathan Chambers

Area
  - Total: 10.58 sq mi (27.39 km^{2})
  - Land: 7.41 sq mi (19.18 km^{2})
  - Water: 3.17 sq mi (8.21 km^{2})
- Elevation: 10 ft (3.0 m)

Population (2020)
  - Total: 9,556
  - Density: 1,290.2/sq mi (498.13/km^{2})
- Time zone: UTC−5 (Eastern (EST))
  - Summer (DST): UTC−4 (EDT)
- ZIP code: 28557
- Area code: 252
- FIPS code: 37-44320
- GNIS feature ID: 2406191
- Website: www.moreheadcitync.gov

Morehead City is a port city in Carteret County, North Carolina, United States. The population was 8,661 at the 2010 census. Morehead City celebrated the 150th anniversary of its founding on May 5, 2007. It forms part of the Crystal Coast.

== History ==
By the early 1850s, a group of investors had been formed and incorporated a land development project known as the "Shepard Point Land Company," which purchased 600 acres (2.4 km^{2}) of land on the eastern tip of the peninsula bordering the Newport River, known then as "Shepards Point," which is the present location of Morehead City. The Shepard Point Land Company's objective was to take advantage of the natural deep channel of Topsail Inlet, known today as Beaufort Inlet, which splits Bogue Banks from Shackleford Banks and provides access to Morehead City, Beaufort, North Carolina, the Newport River and the Intracoastal Waterway. The Shepard Point Land Company was established to construct a deepwater port to allow another access point for North Carolina timber products to relieve pressure at the port located in Wilmington. To make the port accessible to the interior of North Carolina, the Atlantic and North Carolina Railroad line between Goldsboro and New Bern was completed on April 29, 1858.

North Carolina Governor John Motley Morehead, for whom the city of Morehead City is named, was a principal member of the Shepard Point Land Company investment group. Fully operational rail service began in July 1858 connecting the town to points west, north, and south.

The city of Morehead City was laid out using a grid plan, whereby city blocks were equally laid out with each block consisting of 16 equally divided lots. The city blocks stretched from 1st Street to 15th Street, incorporating a system of alleys forming an "H" shape that enabled businesses and residential homes to be served from the alleys behind them.

Morehead City was officially incorporated by the North Carolina Senate in 1860, at which time the total number of households consisted of only 300 individual families.

The city continued to prosper until the Civil War, when in 1862 it was occupied by Federal troops. The war disrupted commerce, and the economy of the port declined along with the town's population. It was not until the 1880s, with the construction of the Atlantic Hotel at the tip of the peninsula and its promotion by the railroad as the "Summer Capital by the Sea," that the area began to experience a resurgence. The popularity of this particular hotel, with its train depot entrance, grand ballroom, piers, sailing, and ferries to the beaches of Bogue Banks, helped to establish Morehead City as a summer destination.

It was also during the 1880s and 1890s that fishermen who had lived on the island of Shackleford Banks moved on to the mainland (often transporting their houses by boat from the outer banks), settling in the areas between 10th and 15th streets and calling it the Promised Land. These fishermen became the nucleus of the fishing industry that has remained an important part of the town's economy.

The Great Depression and World War II markedly altered the character of the town. The traditional downtown area had deteriorated and, as newer stores opened further west, the decay in the old center of town accelerated. Finally, in the 1980s, a renewal began when the town obtained a Community Development Block Grant to replace an aging infrastructure and improve the appearance of the waterfront area. Subsequent grants, private investment, and town monies have maintained the forward momentum, so that the town now has a new sea wall, underground utilities, brick paved walkways with planters along the waterfront, all in the downtown area, and tree-lined streets, renovated houses, new docks and new businesses.

The Morehead City Historic District and Morehead City Municipal Building are listed on the National Register of Historic Places.

== Today's community ==
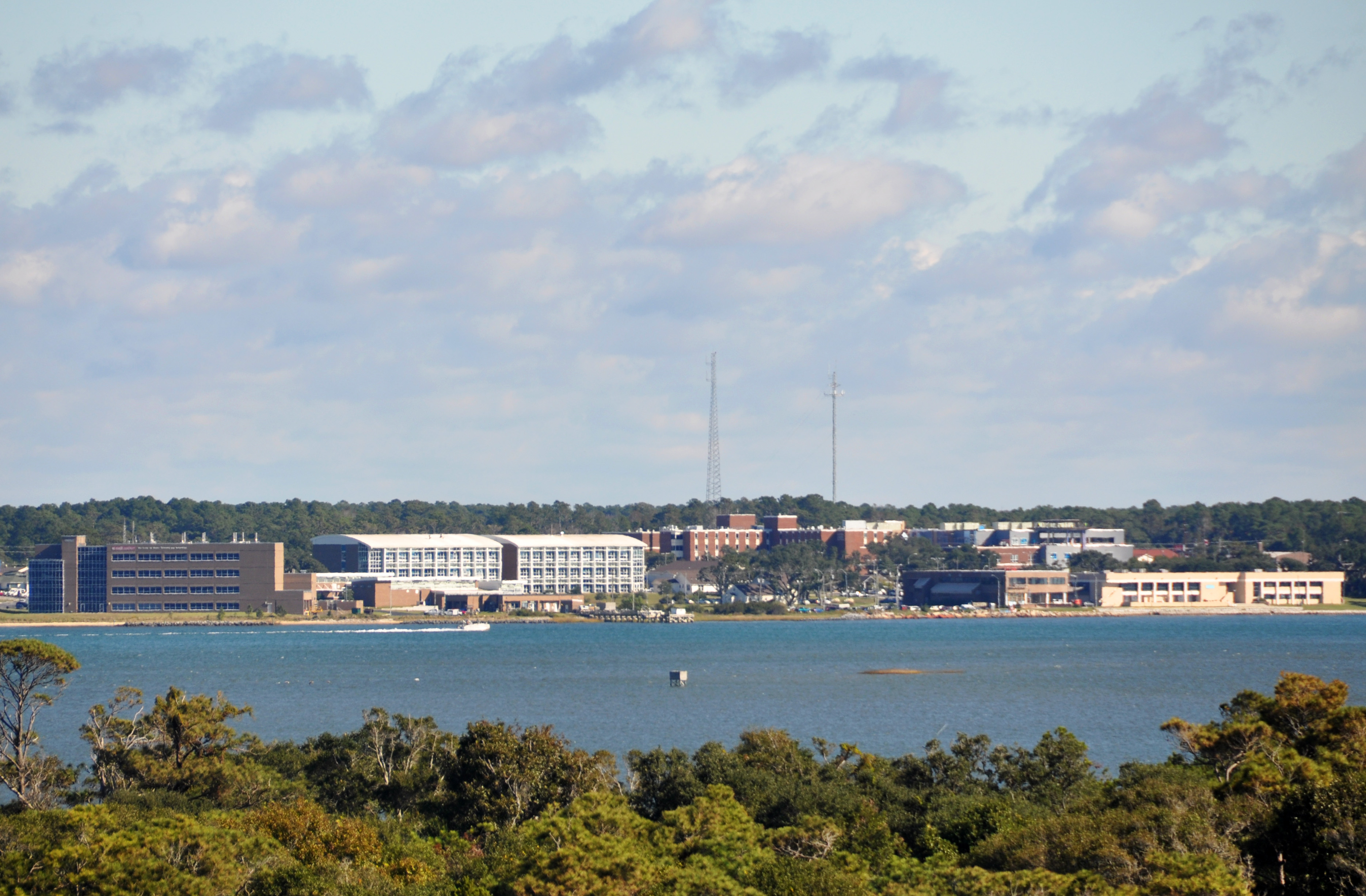
Morehead City seen from Atlantic Beach

Morehead City's economy is based predominantly on a variety of ecotourism activities, a growing retirement community, and the Port of Morehead City. The local economy is based further on the Port of Morehead City, light industry and manufacturing, land development, light commercial fishing, sport fishing, and other service-oriented businesses. The town is within easy access of New Bern, Havelock and Jacksonville, North Carolina. Marine Corps Air Station Cherry Point is 17 miles (27 km) northwest of Morehead City in Havelock, and Marine Corps Base Camp Lejeune is 30 miles (48 km) west of Morehead City near Jacksonville.

Morehead City is one of two existing ports in North Carolina which primarily export phosphate. The Port of Morehead City features a dry-bulk facility with a 225,000-ton capacity warehouse and extended open storage facilities. SpaceX fairing recovery vessels Ms. Tree and Ms. Chief utilize the port during launch and fairing recovery operations as a safe harbor in the event of inclement weather at sea or if there is an extended launch delay.

Carteret General Hospital in Morehead City is the second largest employer in Carteret County, behind the Carteret County Public Schools.

=== Higher education and marine research ===
Carteret Community College serves the undergraduate community with two-year associate degree programs focused primarily on trades and service sector occupations. There are several world-class postgraduate programs and research organizations in the area, including the University of North Carolina's Institute of Marine Sciences, North Carolina State University's Center for Marine Sciences and Technology, and the Duke University Marine Lab in nearby Beaufort.

Morehead City also is home to the Research and Compliance Branch North Carolina Marine Fisheries Division, a governmental organization.

=== Inshore and offshore recreational fishing ===
There are many opportunities for recreational fishing in Morehead City because of its pristine estuaries and close proximity to the Continental Shelf and Gulf Stream. The Gulf Stream carries large sport fish species such as the Atlantic blue marlin and other billfish close to the North Carolina coastline.

Established in 1957, the Big Rock Blue Marlin Tournament draws large crowds of sporting enthusiasts.

=== Scuba diving ===
Morehead City and surrounding areas are a popular scuba diving destination, particularly for the many shipwrecks that have led the waters off North Carolina to be nicknamed the "Graveyard of the Atlantic". Morehead City sits between a number of famous wrecks, including the German submarine U-352, discovered in part by the late Morehead resident George Purifoy.

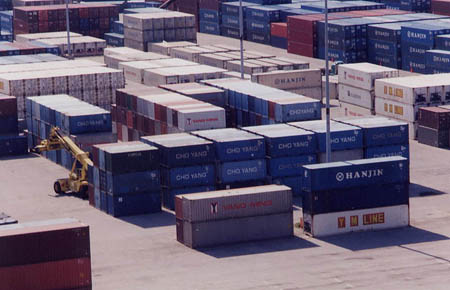
Container terminal

== Traditional sports ==
Morehead City is home to the Morehead City Marlins of the Coastal Plain League, a collegiate summer baseball league. The Marlins play at O'Neal Field at Big Rock Stadium in Morehead City, and began playing in the 2010 season.

Youth sports in Morehead City include Little League Baseball, soccer leagues, and basketball leagues.

== Geography ==
Morehead City is located southwest of the center of Carteret County. It occupies a peninsula bordered to the south by Bogue Sound and to the north and east by the tidal Newport River. Across the river to the east is the town of Beaufort, while to the south across Bogue Sound is Atlantic Beach.

According to the United States Census Bureau, Morehead City has a total area of 8.5 square miles (22.1 km^{2}), of which 6.8 square miles (17.7 km^{2}) is land and 1.7 square miles (4.3 km^{2}), or 19.55%, is water.

== Climate ==
Morehead City has a humid subtropical climate (Cfa) with long, hot summers and short, cool winters.

Climate data for Morehead City, North Carolina (1981–2010 normals), (Note: Mean monthly maxima and minima (i.e. the expected highest and lowest temperature readings at any point during the year or given month) calculated based on data at said location from 1981 to 2010.)
Month	Jan	Feb	Mar	Apr	May	Jun	Jul	Aug	Sep	Oct	Nov	Dec	Year
Record high °F (°C)	78 (26)	77 (25)	86 (30)	92 (33)	97 (36)	103 (39)	100 (38)	98 (37)	94 (34)	95 (35)	84 (29)	79 (26)	103 (39)
Mean maximum °F (°C)	70 (21)	70 (21)	74 (23)	80 (27)	86 (30)	90 (32)	93 (34)	92 (33)	89 (32)	84 (29)	79 (26)	72 (22)	95 (35)
Mean daily maximum °F (°C)	56.3 (13.5)	58.6 (14.8)	64.1 (17.8)	71.5 (21.9)	77.8 (25.4)	84.3 (29.1)	87.5 (30.8)	86.9 (30.5)	83.3 (28.5)	76.1 (24.5)	67.7 (19.8)	59.5 (15.3)	72.8 (22.7)
Mean daily minimum °F (°C)	36.2 (2.3)	38.1 (3.4)	43.6 (6.4)	51.7 (10.9)	60.8 (16.0)	69.6 (20.9)	73.4 (23.0)	72.3 (22.4)	67.1 (19.5)	56.7 (13.7)	47.5 (8.6)	39.3 (4.1)	54.7 (12.6)
Mean minimum °F (°C)	17 (−8)	21 (−6)	27 (−3)	34 (1)	45 (7)	57 (14)	63 (17)	62 (17)	53 (12)	39 (4)	30 (−1)	21 (−6)	15 (−9)
Record low °F (°C)	1 (−17)	8 (−13)	12 (−11)	25 (−4)	35 (2)	40 (4)	54 (12)	53 (12)	41 (5)	27 (−3)	19 (−7)	3 (−16)	1 (−17)
Average precipitation inches (mm)	4.65 (118)	3.84 (98)	4.36 (111)	3.13 (80)	4.56 (116)	4.31 (109)	6.06 (154)	7.49 (190)	7.34 (186)	4.47 (114)	4.57 (116)	4.24 (108)	59 (1,500)
Average snowfall inches (cm)	0.3 (0.76)	0.1 (0.25)	0 (0)	0 (0)	0 (0)	0 (0)	0 (0)	0 (0)	0 (0)	0 (0)	0 (0)	0 (0)	0.4 (1.0)
Average precipitation days (≥ 0.01 in)	9	8	8	7	8	9	11	11	9	7	8	9	102
Average snowy days (≥ 0.1 in)	0	0	0	0	0	0	0	0	0	0	0	0	0
Source: NOAA (North Carolina Observed Climate Normals)

== Demographics ==
Historical population
Census	Pop.	Note	%±
1860	316		—
1870	267		−15.5%
1880	520		94.8%
1890	1,064		104.6%
1900	1,379		29.6%
1910	2,039		47.9%
1920	2,958		45.1%
1930	3,483		17.7%
1940	3,695		6.1%
1950	5,144		39.2%
1960	5,583		8.5%
1970	5,233		−6.3%
1980	4,359		−16.7%
1990	6,046		38.7%
2000	7,691		27.2%
2010	8,661		12.6%
2020	9,556		10.3%
U.S. Decennial Census

=== 2020 census ===
Morehead City racial composition
Race	Number	Percentage
White (non-Hispanic)	7,492	78.4%
Black or African American (non-Hispanic)	738	7.72%
Native American	39	0.41%
Asian	123	1.29%
Pacific Islander	3	0.03%
Other/Mixed	420	4.4%
Hispanic or Latino	741	7.75%

As of the 2020 United States census, there were 9,556 people, 4,428 households, and 2,276 families residing in the town.

=== 2000 census ===
As of the census of 2000, there were 7,691 people, 3,597 households, and 1,985 families residing in the town. The population density was 1,507.6 inhabitants per square mile (582.1/km^{2}). There were 4,296 housing units at an average density of 842.1 per square mile (325.1/km^{2}). The racial makeup of the town was 81.71% White, 13.98% Black (U.S. Census), 0.66% Native American, 0.77% Asian, 0.04% Pacific Islander, 1.13% from other races, and 1.72% from two or more races. Hispanic or Latino of any race were 2.34% of the population.

There were 3,597 households, out of which 23.5% had children under the age of 18 living with them, 37.9% were married couples living together, 13.7% had a female householder with no husband present, and 44.8% were non-families. 39.0% of all households were made up of individuals, and 16.5% had someone living alone who was 65 years of age or older. The average household size was 2.06 and the average family size was 2.73.

In the town the age distribution of the population shows 20.2% under the age of 18, 7.7% from 18 to 24, 27.2% from 25 to 44, 24.1% from 45 to 64, and 20.8% who were 65 years of age or older. The median age was 41 years. For every 100 females, there were 83.8 males. For every 100 females age 18 and over, there were 78.3 males.

The median income for a household in the town was $28,737, and the median income for a family was $39,290. Males had a median income of $26,852 versus $21,995 for females. The per capita income for the town was $19,138. About 12.1% of families and 14.6% of the population were below the poverty line, including 21.7% of those under age 18 and 12.3% of those age 65 or over.

== Transportation ==
=== Highways ===
- NC 24 (often used to transport U.S. Marines to and from Camp Lejeune)
- US 70

==== Future Interstate ====
- Future I-42

=== Train ===
Morehead City Train Depot, a historic train station which currently serves as an event space

Amtrak provides a Thruway Bus to Wilson station which connects with the daily Palmetto train to New York City and Savannah, Georgia, as well as the daily Carolinian train to New York City and Charlotte.

Into the early 1950s, the Atlantic and East Carolina Railway ran a daily passenger train to Goldsboro' s Union Station. The connections at Goldsboro were timed to accommodate a local Southern Railway overnight train (#111/#112, in final years, #11/#112) to parts in central and western North Carolina, comparable to the North Carolina section of the Carolina Special.

The North Carolina Railroad is a state-owned rail corridor which runs from Charlotte to Morehead City, though only the portion between Charlotte and Raleigh is currently used for passenger service. As of 2007, the North Carolina Department of Transportation was studying the resumption of intercity passenger train service from Raleigh through Goldsboro to Morehead City.

== Hospital ==
- Carteret Health Care

== Education ==
=== Elementary schools ===
- Morehead City Primary School
- Morehead City Elementary School at Camp Glenn

=== Middle schools ===
- Morehead Middle School

=== High schools ===
- West Carteret High School

=== Higher learning ===
- Carteret Community College
- UNC-Chapel Hill Institute of Marine Sciences
- NCSU Center for Marine Sciences and Technology

=== Private schools ===
- St. Egbert's Catholic School

== Media ==
=== Newspapers ===
The Carteret County News-Times is the local newspaper, published three times a week, and is owned by Carteret Publishing Company.

=== Television ===
Morehead City is part of the Greenville–New Bern–Washington designated market area, which was the 109th largest in 2007 (according to Nielsen Media Research). Broadcast Television Stations serving the market include:

- WITN-TV, the (7), Washington (NBC affiliate)
- WNCT-TV, the (9), Greenville (CBS affiliate) the CW on their digital subchannel
- WCTI-TV, the (12), New Bern (ABC affiliate, independent "ENC-TV" On Digital)
- WYDO-TV, the (14), Greenville (Fox affiliate)
- WUNM-TV, the (19), Jacksonville (PBS affiliate of the PBS North Carolina Network)
- WPXU-TV, the (35), Jacksonville (i network/My Network affiliate)

=== Radio stations ===
- 88.3 FM: WXBE AFR (Christian)
- 89.3 FM: WTEB Public Radio East (NPR/Classical)
- 90.7 FM: WOTJ FBN (Sacred Christian)
- 91.5 FM: WBJD Public Radio East (NPR)
- 92.3 FM: WQSL
- 92.7 FM: WBNK 92.7 The Beacon (Contemporary Christian)
- 93.3 FM: WERO Bob 93.3 (Contemporary Hit Radio)
- 94.1 FM: WNBU (Oldies)
- 95.1 FM: WRNS-FM 95.1 WRNS (Country)
- 96.3 FM: WRHT (Talk Radio)
- 97.9 FM: WNBB The Bear (Classic Country)
- 98.7 FM: WRMR Modern Rock 98.7 (Modern Rock)
- 99.5 FM: WMJV (Hot Adult Contemporary)
- 100.3 FM: WLGP GNN (Christian)
- 101.9 FM: WIKS 101.9 Kiss FM (Urban)
- 103.3 FM: WMGV V 103.3 Soft Rock (AC)
- 104.5 FM: WSTK
- 105.1 FM: WLGV K-LOVE 105.1 (Contemporary Christian)
- 106.5 FM: WSFL-FM 106.5 WSFL (Classic Rock)
- 107.1 FM: WTKF The Talk Station 107.1 (News/Talk)
- 107.9 FM: WNCT-FM 107.9 WNCT (Classic Hits)
- 1120 AM: WSME (Classic Country/Bluegrass)
