= Marble Hill, Tennessee =

- Neighborhood
- Location within Tennessee
- Coordinates: 35°12′12″N 86°19′24″W
- Country: United States
- State: Tennessee
- County: Moore
- City: Lynchburg
- Elevation: 790 ft (240 m)
- Time zone: UTC-6 (Central (CST))
  - Summer (DST): UTC-5 (CDT)
- ZIP code: 37352
- Area code: 931
- GNIS feature ID: 1315463

Marble Hill is a neighborhood within the city of Lynchburg in Moore County, Tennessee.

The center of Marble Hill is generally considered to be the intersection of Bobby Harrison Road, Marble Hill Road, and Short Creek Road. Tennessee State Route 50 is nearby to the east.

The first house in Marble Hill was built in 1835. The community's peak was just before the American Civil War, with only one business remaining in the town afterward.
