= National Register of Historic Places listings in Carteret County, North Carolina =

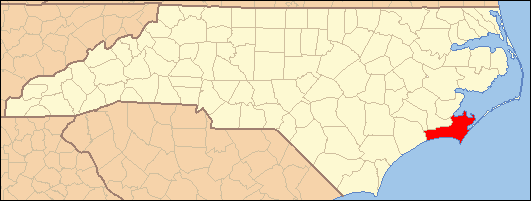

This list includes properties and districts listed on the National Register of Historic Places in Carteret County, North Carolina. Click the "Map of all coordinates" link to the right to view an online map of all properties and districts with latitude and longitude coordinates in the table below.

== Current listings ==
This National Park Service list is complete through NPS recent listings posted July 11, 2025.

	Name on the Register	Image	Date listed	Location	City or town	Description
1	Beaufort Historic District	Beaufort Historic District	May 6, 1974 (#74001331)	Roughly bounded by Beaufort Channel, Pine and Fulford Sts., and Taylors Creek; 34°42′46″N 76°40′08″W	Beaufort	
2	HMT BEDFORDSHIRE (shipwreck and remains)	HMT BEDFORDSHIRE (shipwreck and remains)	July 31, 2015 (#15000421)	Offshore Beaufort; 34°11′19″N 76°16′17″W	Beaufort	Bedfordshire was the only one of the 24 British armed trawlers to be directly attacked and sunk by a German submarine off the American coast.
3	Cape Lookout Coast Guard Station	Cape Lookout Coast Guard Station	February 1, 1989 (#88003436)	Cape Lookout; 34°36′11″N 76°32′17″W	Core Banks	
4	Cape Lookout Light Station	Cape Lookout Light Station	October 18, 1972 (#72000097)	On Core Banks; 34°37′24″N 76°31′30″W	Core Banks	
5	Cape Lookout Village Historic District	Cape Lookout Village Historic District	June 3, 2000 (#00000692)	Cape Lookout from Lighthouse to Coast Guard St.; bounded by ocean and a concrete road, and concrete road across Bight; 34°36′45″N 76°32′06″W	Core Banks	
6	Carteret County Home	Carteret County Home	December 20, 1984 (#84000528)	NC 101; 34°43′52″N 76°39′00″W	Beaufort	
7	Fort Macon	Fort Macon	February 26, 1970 (#70000445)	Bogue Point, on Fort Macon Rd., 4 miles E of Atlantic Beach; 34°41′45″N 76°40′45″W	Atlantic Beach	
8	Gibbs House	Gibbs House	March 14, 1973 (#73001302)	903 Front St. 34°42′50″N 76°39′34″W	Beaufort	
9	Jacob Henry House	Jacob Henry House	May 7, 1973 (#73001303)	229 Front St. 34°43′04″N 76°40′04″W	Beaufort	
10	Morehead City Historic District	Morehead City Historic District	April 18, 2003 (#03000266)	Roughly along Fisher St. and Bridges St., from N. 5th St. to N. 12th St. 34°43′21″N 76°42′51″W	Morehead City	
11	Morehead City Municipal Building	Morehead City Municipal Building	August 11, 2004 (#04000828)	202 S. Eighth St. 34°43′13″N 76°42′48″W	Morehead City	
12	Old Burying Ground	Old Burying Ground	April 8, 1974 (#74001332)	Bounded by Ann, Craven, and Broad Sts. 34°43′07″N 76°39′51″W	Beaufort	
13	Portsmouth Village	Portsmouth Village	November 29, 1978 (#78000267)	N end of Core Banks; 35°04′04″N 76°03′43″W	Portsmouth	
14	Queen Anne's Revenge	Queen Anne's Revenge	March 9, 2004 (#04000148)	Address Restricted	Atlantic Beach	Wreck of the infamous pirate Blackbeard's flagship.
15	Salter-Battle Hunting and Fishing Lodge		May 5, 2005 (#05000381)	Sheep Island; 35°03′28″N 76°04′49″W	Ocracoke	
16	U-352 (submarine) shipwreck and remains	U-352 (submarine) shipwreck and remains	November 12, 2015 (#15000804)	Offshore; 34°08′13″N 76°20′21″W	Beaufort	First U-boat sunk by the United States Coast Guard off the American East Coast during World War II's Battle of the Atlantic.
17	Earle W. Webb, Jr. Memorial Civic Center and Library		August 20, 2021 (#100006852)	812 Evans St. 34°43′14″N 76°42′50″W	Morehead City	

== See also ==
- National Register of Historic Places listings in North Carolina
- List of National Historic Landmarks in North Carolina
