= David Wallis =

American football wide receiver (born 2001)

Colorado Stampede
- Positions: Wide receiver, return specialist
- Roster status: Active

Personal information
- Born: August 8, 2001 (age 25); Cedar Point, North Carolina
- Listed height: 6 ft 0 in (1.83 m)
- Listed weight: 184 lb (83 kg)

Career information
- High school: Croatan (Newport, North Carolina)
- College: Randolph–Macon (2019–2023)
- NFL draft: 2024: undrafted

Career history
- New England Patriots (2024)*; Hamilton Tiger-Cats (2025)*; Colorado Stampede (2027–present)
- * Offseason or practice squad member only

Awards and highlights
- First Team All-ODAC (2022, 2023); Second Team All-ODAC (2020)

David Wallis (born August 8, 2001) is an American professional football wide receiver and return specialist for the Colorado Stampede of the United Football League (UFL). He played college football at Randolph–Macon, and was signed by the New England Patriots as an undrafted free agent in 2024.

== Early life and college career ==
Wallis attended Croatan High School in Newport, North Carolina and played four positions, including at quarterback, running back, placekicker, and return specialist. He began playing for the Randolph–Macon Yellow Jackets in 2019 as a running back and wide receiver, but ultimately chose to play as a return specialist in his junior season while retaining the wide receiver position throughout his college tenure. As a wide receiver, he tallied 3,144 yards receiving from 146 receptions and 34 touchdowns in 42 games played.

== Professional career ==
Pre-draft measurables
Height	Weight	Arm length	Hand span	40-yard dash	10-yard split	20-yard split	20-yard shuttle	Three-cone drill	Vertical jump	Broad jump	Bench press
5 ft 11 1/4 in (1.81 m)	183 lb (83 kg)	30 in (0.76 m)	8 3/4 in (0.22 m)	4.50 s	1.53 s	2.70 s	4.20 s	6.94 s	35.0 in (0.89 m)	10 ft 0 in (3.05 m)	7 reps
All values from Pro Day

=== New England Patriots ===
Wallis signed with the New England Patriots as an undrafted free agent on June 3, 2024. He was waived on August 27. He briefly practiced with the New York Giants shortly after he was waived. In September 2024, the Chicago Bears briefly took interest in Wallis for a return specialist on the team following poor performances by Velus Jones Jr. in Week 1.

=== Hamilton Tiger-Cats ===
On February 14, 2025, Wallis was signed by the Hamilton Tiger-Cats of the Canadian Football League (CFL). On May 31, he was released by the Tiger-Cats.

=== Colorado Stampede ===
On November 2, 2026, Wallis was signed by the Colorado Stampede ahead of training camp.
