= Josiah Fisher Bell =

Josiah Fisher Bell (1820-October 1890) was the youngest son of Josiah Bell (for whom the Bell House is named) and his wife Mary. He married Susan Benjamin Leecraft on November 25, 1841. Although listed as a farmer on the 1860 Carteret County census, he was more widely known for his role with the Confederate Secret Service during the Civil War. Bell is buried in the Old Burying Ground. The attempted sabotage of the Cape Lookout Lighthouse is among the projects which he was known for.

== Josiah Bell House ==
The building, now known as the Josiah Bell House, was built in 1825 at what is now 138 Turner Street in Beaufort, North Carolina, and is a part of the Beaufort Historic Site. The younger Bell inherited the house upon his father's death in 1843 and raised his family there as well.
