= Stella, North Carolina =

Unincorporated community in North Carolina, US

Stella
- Unincorporated community
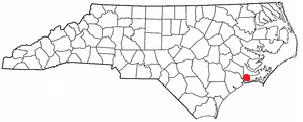
- Location within the U.S. state of North Carolina
- Coordinates: 34.77°N 77.15°W
- Country: United States
- State: North Carolina
- County: Carteret
- Time zone: UTC-5 (EST)
  - Summer (DST): UTC-4 (EDT)
- ZIP Code: 28582
- Area code: 252

Stella is an unincorporated community in Carteret County, North Carolina, United States.

== Geography ==
Stella is located in northwestern Carteret County, north of Cedar Point.

Stella is within the White Oak Township in Carteret County.

The ZIP Code for Stella is 28582.

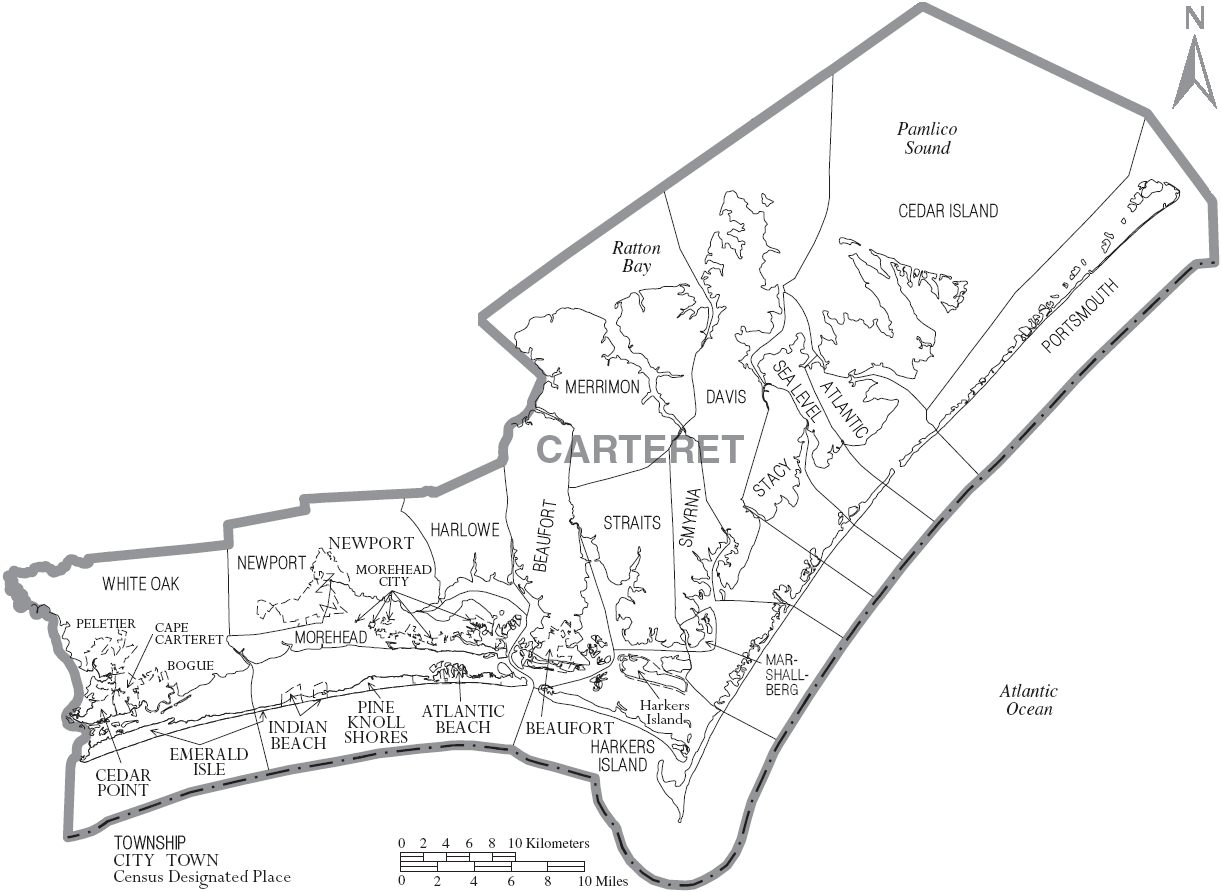
Map of Carteret County with municipal and township labels
