= White Oak Township, Carteret County, North Carolina =

White Oak Township
- Township
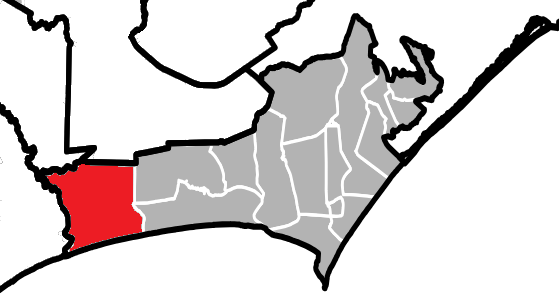
- Location of White Oak Township within Carteret County

- Location of Carteret County within North Carolina
- Coordinates: 34°42′30″N 77°02′09″W
- Country: United States
- U.S. state: North Carolina
- County: Carteret

Area
  - Total: 80.9 sq mi (210 km^{2})

Population
  - Estimate (2023): 16,033
- Time zone: UTC-5 (EST)
  - Summer (DST): UTC-4 (EDT)
- Area code: 252

White Oak Township is a township in Carteret County, North Carolina, United States.

== Geography ==
White Oak Township is one of 16 townships within Carteret County. It is 80.9 square miles (210 km^{2}) in total area, and is the westernmost township in the county.

Communities within White Oak Township include Cape Carteret, Cedar Point, Emerald Isle, and Peletier. The White Oak River forms the western border of the township.

White Oak Township is bordered to the northwest by Jones County, to the northeast by Craven County, to the east by Morehead Township and Newport Township, to the south by the Atlantic Ocean, and to the west by Onslow County.

== Population ==
In 2023, the estimated population of the township was 16,033.
