= Croatan High School =

American public school in North Carolina

Location
- 3355 Hwy 24; Newport, North Carolina 28570; United States; 34°43′16″N 76°57′12″W

Information
- School type: Public
- Opened: 1998 (28 years ago)
- School district: Carteret County Public Schools
- CEEB code: 342892
- NCES School ID: 370063002369
- Principal: Chris Davis
- Teaching staff: 60.61 (FTE)
- Grades: 9–12
- Enrollment: 1,015 (2023–2024)
- Student to teacher ratio: 16.75
- Colors: Black and gold
- Athletics conference: Coastal Conference
- Mascot: Cougar
- Website: chs.carteretcountyschools.org

Croatan High School is a public secondary school in Newport, North Carolina. The high school is part of the Carteret County Public Schools system. It serves the westernmost third of Carteret County, including the towns of Peletier, Cape Carteret, Cedar Point and western half of the island of Bogue Banks, which includes the town of Emerald Isle.

== Awards and recognition ==
In 2009 and 2010, U.S. News & World Report ranked Croatan among the top high schools in the United States, awarding the school silver medals. Croatan High School's class of 2010 marked combined SAT scores (based on math and critical reading) of 1076, up from 1064 the previous year, this was 59 points higher than the national average.

== Athletics ==
All athletic teams compete in the 5A division level. Croatan holds several state titles including men's soccer, wrestling, women's golf, men's indoor track, men's lacrosse and women’s lacrosse.

- Football
- Men's and Women's Soccer
- Men's and Women's Golf
- Men's and Women's Basketball
- Men's and Women's Swim
- Men's and Women's Lacrosse
- Wrestling
- Cheerleading
- Track and Field
- Cross Country

== See also ==
- List of high schools in North Carolina
