= Beaufort Historic District (Beaufort, North Carolina) =

Historic district in North Carolina, United States

- U.S. National Register of Historic Places
- U.S. Historic district
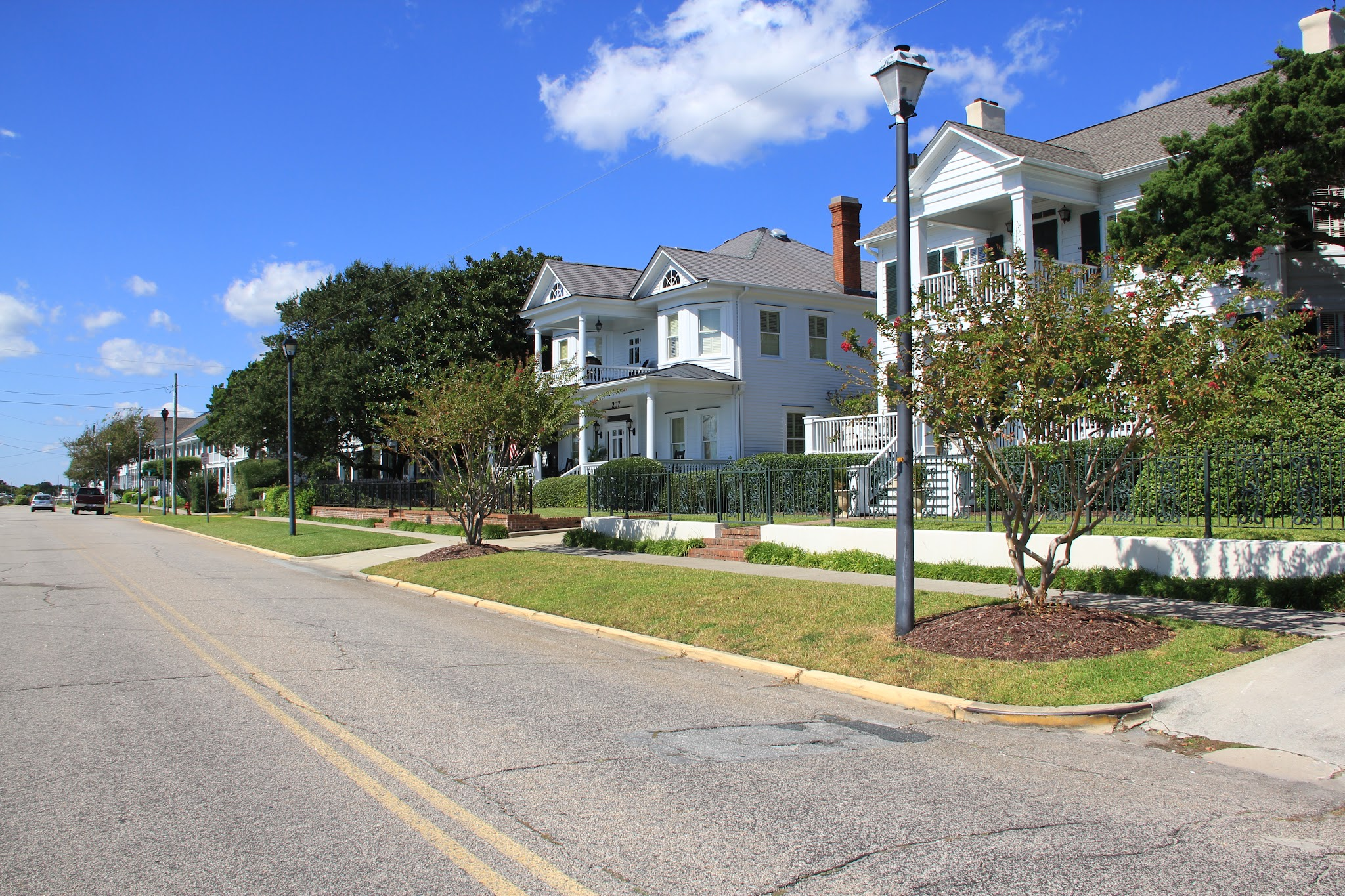
- Historical Beaufort, September 2012

- Location within North Carolina Location within the United States
- Location: Roughly bounded by Beaufort Channel, Pine and Fulford Sts., and Taylors Creek, Beaufort, North Carolina
- Coordinates: 34°42′46″N 76°40′08″W
- Area: 900 acres (360 ha)
- Built: 1710
- Built by: Simpson, Herbert Woodley
- Architectural style: Greek Revival, Queen Anne, Gothic Revival
- NRHP reference No.: 74001331
- Added to NRHP: May 6, 1974

Beaufort Historic District is a national historic district located at Beaufort, Carteret County, North Carolina. It encompasses 16 contributing buildings in the oldest section of the town of Beaufort. The buildings include notable examples of Queen Anne and Greek Revival, and Gothic Revival style architecture. Located in the district are the separately listed Gibbs House, Jacob Henry House, and Old Burying Ground. The Duncan House, located in the district, was destroyed by a fire in 2025.

It was listed on the National Register of Historic Places in 2003.
