= Bogue, North Carolina =

- Town
- Seal

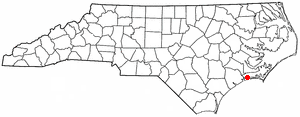
- Location of Bogue, North Carolina
- Coordinates: 34°41′53″N 77°01′52″W
- Country: United States
- State: North Carolina
- County: Carteret

Area
  - Total: 2.77 sq mi (7.17 km^{2})
  - Land: 2.75 sq mi (7.11 km^{2})
  - Water: 0.019 sq mi (0.05 km^{2})
- Elevation: 16 ft (4.9 m)

Population (2020)
  - Total: 695
  - Density: 253.1/sq mi (97.71/km^{2})
- Time zone: UTC-5 (Eastern (EST))
  - Summer (DST): UTC-4 (EDT)
- ZIP code: 28570
- FIPS code: 37-06740
- GNIS feature ID: 2405295
- Website: www.bogue-nc.org

Bogue is a town in Carteret County, North Carolina, United States. As of the 2020 census, Bogue had a population of 695.

== History ==
June 1899 was marked by two murders in the tiny town. On June 9, Elijah Weeks, a white merchant, was found dead in his store. The next day Lewis Patrick, a young black man, was detained because he had a piece of pork in his possession. He was arrested and taken to the county jail in Beaufort. On the night of June 14, 1899, he was taken from jail by a mob and out to a roadside, where he was shot to death, with his body left by the road for others to find. This was the only known lynching in Carteret County.

== Geography ==
Bogue is located in western Carteret County. It is bordered to the south by Bogue Sound and to the west by the town of Cape Carteret. The southern part of the town houses Marine Corps Auxiliary Landing Field Bogue. The town is bordered to the north by Croatan National Forest.

North Carolina Highway 24 passes through Bogue, leading west 24 miles (39 km) to Jacksonville and east 18 miles (29 km) to Morehead City.

According to the United States Census Bureau, Bogue has a total area of 3.0 square miles (7.8 km^{2}), of which 2.8 square miles (7.2 km^{2}) is land and 0.23 square miles (0.6 km^{2}), or 7.95%, is water.

== Demographics ==
Historical population
Census	Pop.	Note	%±
2000	590		—
2010	684		15.9%
2020	695		1.6%
U.S. Decennial Census

=== 2020 census ===
Bogue racial composition
Race	Number	Percentage
White (non-Hispanic)	611	87.91%
Black or African American (non-Hispanic)	18	2.59%
Native American	1	0.14%
Asian	2	0.29%
Pacific Islander	1	0.14%
Other/Mixed	29	4.17%
Hispanic or Latino	33	4.75%

As of the 2020 United States census, there were 695 people, 279 households, and 185 families residing in the town.

=== 2000 census ===
As of the census of 2000, there were 590 people, 224 households, and 170 families residing in the town. The population density was 219.5 inhabitants per square mile (84.7/km^{2}). There were 259 housing units at an average density of 96.3 per square mile (37.2/km^{2}). The racial makeup of the town was 96.10% White, 2.20% African American, 0.17% Native American, 0.17% Asian, 0.17% Pacific Islander, 0.51% from other races, and 0.68% from two or more races. Hispanic or Latino of any race were 0.51% of the population.

There were 224 households, out of which 36.6% had children under the age of 18 living with them, 67.0% were married couples living together, 7.1% had a female householder with no husband present, and 23.7% were non-families. 17.4% of all households were made up of individuals, and 8.5% had someone living alone who was 65 years of age or older. The average household size was 2.63 and the average family size was 3.01.

In the town, the population was spread out, with 26.9% under the age of 18, 5.8% from 18 to 24, 28.1% from 25 to 44, 24.2% from 45 to 64, and 14.9% who were 65 years of age or older. The median age was 39 years. For every 100 females, there were 91.6 males. For every 100 females age 18 and over, there were 91.6 males.

The median income for a household in the town was $44,643, and the median income for a family was $45,938. Males had a median income of $31,111 versus $21,094 for females. The per capita income for the town was $20,095. About 4.5% of families and 6.3% of the population were below the poverty line, including 10.8% of those under age 18 and 4.9% of those age 65 or over.
