= Bruce Roberts =

Bruce Roberts may refer to:

- Bruce Roberts (cricketer) (born 1962), Zambian cricketer who played for Transvaal
- Bruce Roberts (curler), American curler
- Bruce Roberts (photographer), American news and portrait photographer
- Bruce Roberts (runner) (born 1957), Canadian Olympic athlete
- Bruce Roberts (singer), singer and songwriter
