= Beaufort Historic Site =

Coordinates: 34°43′3″N 76°39′55″W

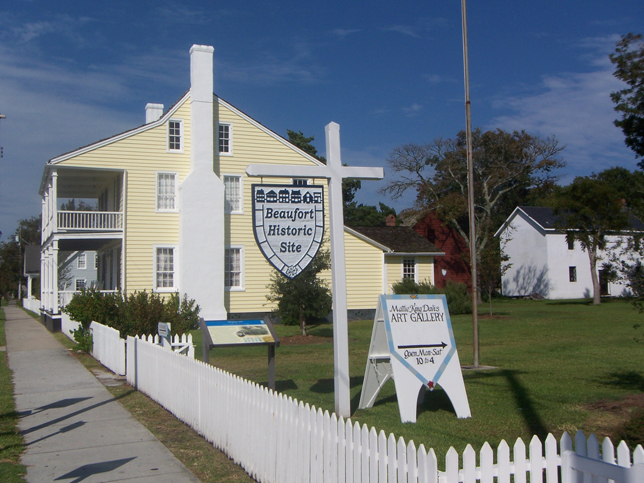
The Beaufort Historic Site in 2007

The Beaufort Historic Site in the middle of Beaufort, North Carolina's historic district, is home to a complex of nine historic houses that tell the story of the coastal region of North Carolina in the 18th and 19th centuries. One of the homes is the Josiah Bell House, home to Josiah Fisher Bell, a Confederate spy in a town where 40% of the population sympathized with the Union during the American Civil War. The other historic buildings include:

- Leffers Cottage, c1778, former home of Samuel Leffers
- Carteret County Courthouse, c1796, the oldest wood-framed courthouse in North Carolina
- John C. Manson House, c1825
- The Old Jail, c1829, which remained in use until 1954
- The Apothecary Shop and Doctor's Office, c1859

The Beaufort Historical Association, which operates the two-acre site, also operates the nearby Old Burying Ground, home to some former residents of historic Beaufort. The cemetery was also among the few consecrated by Union and Confederate clergy.
