= Carteret County Public Schools =

School district in North Carolina, US

Location
- Carteret County, North Carolina United States

District information
- Type: Public
- Grades: PK–12
- Superintendent: Richard Paylor
- Accreditation: AdvancED
- Schools: 18
- Budget: $ 95,694,000
- NCES District ID: 3700630

Students and staff
- Students: 8,626
- Teachers: 636.55 (on FTE basis)
- Staff: 504.45 (on FTE basis)
- Student–teacher ratio: 13.55:1

Other information
- Website: www.carteretcountyschools.org

Carteret County Public Schools (CCPS) is a PK–12 school district serving Carteret County, North Carolina. Its 18 schools serve approximately 8,000 students as of the 2024-2025 school year.

== Student demographics ==
For the 2010–2011 school year, Carteret County Public Schools had a total population of 8,626 students and 636.55 teachers on a (FTE) basis. This produced a student-teacher ratio of 13.55:1. 52% of the entire student body was male and 48% was female in that same year. The demographic group makeup was: White, 80%; Black, 7%; Hispanic, 5%; American Indian, 1%; and Asian/Pacific Islander, 1% (two or more races: 6%). For the same school year, 73.96% of the students received free and reduced-cost lunches.

== Governance and funding ==
The primary governing body of Carteret County Public Schools follows a council–manager government format with a seven-member Board of Education appointing a Superintendent to run the day-to-day operations of the system. The school system currently resides in the North Carolina State Board of Education's Second District.

=== Board of education ===
The seven members of the Board of Education generally meet on the first Tuesday of each month. The current members of the board are: Al Hill (Chair), Cathy Neagle (Vice Chair), David Carr, June Fulcher, Perry Harker, Mark Mansfield, and John "Bubba" McLean.

=== Superintendent ===
The current superintendent of Carteret County Public Schools is Richard Paylor. He has been serving in this role since November 1, 2022.

=== Funding ===
For the 2008–09 school year, expenditures totaled $95,694,000. Public school districts in North Carolina do not have their own taxation authority; they are fiscally dependent on the State and their respective county Board of Commissioners. The county Boards of Commissioners vote on funding levels proposed by the school system.

In 2010, The Carteret County Public School Foundation was formed to provide supplemental funding for the system in order to promote teaching and educational achievements in STEM fields, reading and writing skills, pre-school education, visual arts, and innovation in education. They received their first large donation of $25,000 from PotashCorp-Aurora, in 2012.

== Member schools ==
Carteret County Public Schools has 17 schools ranging from pre-kindergarten to twelfth grade. Those 17 schools are separated into four high schools, four middle schools, and nine elementary schools.

=== High schools ===
- Croatan High School (Newport)
- East Carteret High School (Beaufort)
- West Carteret High School (Morehead City)

=== Middle schools ===
- Beaufort Middle School (Beaufort)
- Broad Creek Middle School (Newport)
- Down East Middle School (Smyrna)
- Morehead City Middle School (Morehead City)
- Newport Middle School (Newport)

=== Elementary schools ===
- Atlantic Elementary School (Atlantic)
- Beaufort Elementary School (Beaufort)
- Bogue Sound Elementary School (Newport)
- Harkers Island Elementary School (Harkers Island)
- Morehead City Elementary School at Camp Glenn (Morehead City)
- Morehead City Primary School (Morehead City)
- Newport Elementary School (Newport)
- Smyrna Elementary School (Smyrna)
- White Oak Elementary School (Cape Carteret)

== Athletics ==
According to the North Carolina High School Athletic Association, for the 2012–2013 school year:

- Croatan is a 2A school in the East Central Conference.
- East Carteret is a 1A school in the Coastal Plains Conference.
- West Carteret is a 3A school in the Coastal Conference.

== See also ==
- List of school districts in North Carolina
