= Bruce Roberts (photographer) =

American photographer and author (1930–2023)

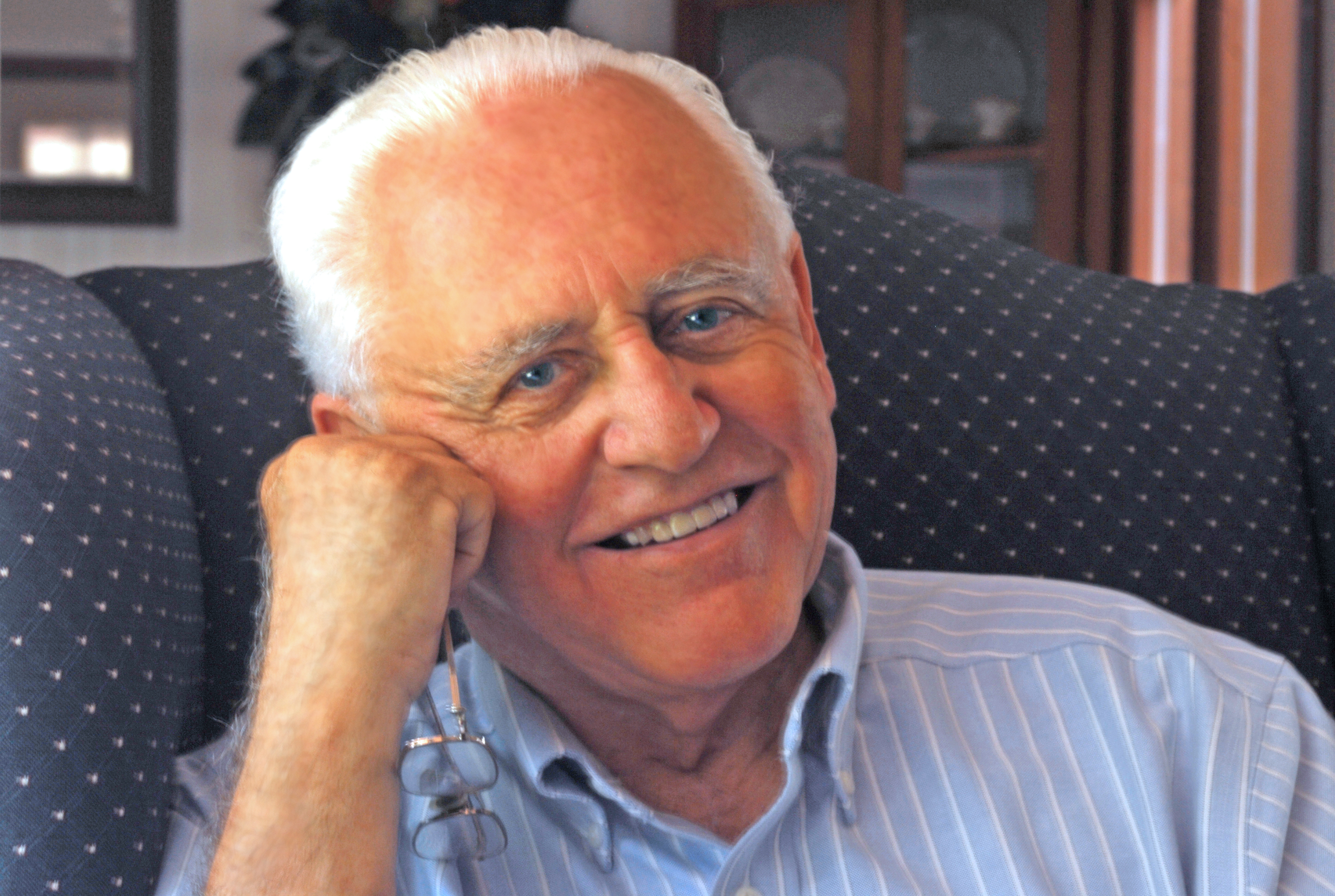
- Roberts in 2009
- Born: Bruce Stuart Roberts; February 4, 1930; Mount Vernon, New York, U.S.
- Died: June 16, 2023 (aged 93); Newport, North Carolina, U.S.
- Education: Bachelor of Science
- Alma mater: New York University; University of Florida
- Known for: Photography
- Spouse(s): Cheryl Shelton-Roberts; Nancy Roberts (Ex-wife; 1958–1980s)
- Awards: Southern Photographer of the Year (twice); National Press Photographers Association News Photographers competition winner (three times); Carl Goerch Award (first)
- Website: www.brucerobertsphotography.com

Bruce Stuart Roberts (February 4, 1930 – June 16, 2023) was an American photographer and author who began his career in the 1950s. He started out as a reporter but soon moved into photography and was part of the group of photojournalists at The Charlotte Observer who pioneered the use of the 35 mm format cameras. Over the years his work has appeared in Time, Life, Sports Illustrated, and Time Life Books. Roberts was also a prolific writer, both with his first wife, Nancy Roberts and his second wife Cheryl Shelton-Roberts.

From 1978 through 1992, he worked for Southern Living magazine, first as director of photography and later as senior travel photographer. Through his work as a photographer he has depicted such significant events as the civil rights movement in the 1960s and rural health initiatives in the 1970s. In later years much of his work has been spent photographing and documenting lighthouses, a subject he has shared through several books he has either co-authored or illustrations with photographs.

Roberts and his first wife had two children, Nancy and David. They divorced in the 1980s. Their son David was the subject of their collaborative book David chronicling their experiences of raising a son with Down syndrome. Their daughter Nancy is an attorney.

== Early years ==
Bruce Stuart Roberts was born on February 4, 1930, in the Bronx adjacent New York suburb Mount Vernon. He became interested in photography around the age of 14, and delivered newspapers to earn money for his hobby. Roberts later recalled how his money went to buying the material he would need to take and develop photographs, creating his own darkroom in the basement and taught himself about photography. He later used his photography skills to pay for his Bachelor of Science degree from New York University, taking pictures at various events such as parties and board meetings. He graduated from New York University in 1951 and joined the United States Air Force, serving from 1951 to 1953 and becoming a staff sergeant. After his stint in the Air Force Roberts attended the University of Florida where he completed his postgraduate studies in 1954.

== Career ==
Following his postgraduate studies Roberts moved to North Carolina, taking a job as a photographer for the local Hamlet News-Messenger newspaper, in Hamlet, North Carolina, just south of Rockingham on the South Carolina border. During his early years in North Carolina his photos were published in national and international publications such as Life, Look, Time and the Saturday Evening Post. Many of his photos were used on the cover of The State magazine (now known as Our State). In 1958 he was hired as a staff photographer for The Charlotte Observer newspaper, working for editor Pete McKnight as part of a group of young up-and-coming photographers. The group of Charlotte Observer photographers would be among the first to use 35 mm photography in their work, and would later be credited with being pioneers of the 35 mm camera in photojournalism as well in as the use of natural light for their photos. In 1959 and 1961, Roberts was named "Southern Photographer of the Year" for his work with the Charlotte Observer. He also took first place in the National Press Photographers Association news pictures competition in 1959, 1960 and 1961. In 1962 Roberts took the position of Director of Photography for the News Journal paper in Wilmington, Delaware, where he remained until 1963. Over time he would also take photographs of various important historical figures of the time such as Reverend Billy Graham, Elvis Presley, John F. Kennedy and Joe DiMaggio.

One day last summer, Bruce Roberts flew from his home in Charlotte to Atlanta to photograph a magazine story. Working almost nonstop for 36 hours, Roberts exposed 27 rolls of film. The end product was one superb photograph of an Atlanta policeman working in the slums. It is that kind of relentless effort that has made him one of the best in his profession. But it is also compassion, the kind of compassion that allows a parent to live and love a child who is retarded. That makes him the artist he is.”

— Reg Murphy. Atlanta Journal and Constitution editor, 1968,

In 1963 Roberts began to work as a freelance photographer instead of specifically for one newspaper. During this period he and his then-wife Nancy Roberts co-authored several books, including The Governor in 1972 and Goodliest Land in 1973. Later they wrote books about the supernatural, releasing books such as Ghosts and Specters: Ten Supernatural Stories in 1974 America's Most Haunted Places in 1976, and Southern Ghosts in 1979. Roberts' photographs also appeared in the children's book Where Time Stood Still: A Portrait of Appalachia, which was named by The New York Times as one of the best children's books of 1970.

In 1978 he became the director of photography for Southern Living magazine, a position he held until 1982. In 1982 he took on the role of senior travel photographer for the magazine, focusing on depicting the Southern United States. In 1992, after 14 years with Southern Living he left to pursue freelance photography and to focus on contributing to various books, especially books on the lighthouses of North Carolina which became his passion. In the fall of 1994, while living in Nags Head on the Outer Banks of North Carolina, Roberts and his second wife Cheryl Shelton-Roberts co-founded the Outer Banks Lighthouse Society dedicated to preserving North Carolina's lighthouses and to spreading awareness about their history, and served on its board of directors. Starting in 1997 Roberts, working with Cheryl, published his first book on the historical lighthouses, called Lighthouse Families. In subsequent years the Roberts published further books on lighthouses in and around North Carolina. He would later be awarded "Keeper of the Light" award from the American Lighthouse Foundation as a result of the preservation initiatives he led through the Outer Banks Lighthouse Society. In 2001 Our State magazine awarded Roberts the first ever Carl Goerch Award, named after the magazine's founder. In a 2005 article in Lighthouse Magazine, magazine editor Tim Harrison and the magazine staff declared that Roberts was one of America's all-time best lighthouse photographers, citing his long history of capturing historical lighthouses on film. In 2010 the Outer Banks History Center (OBHC) presented an exhibit of Roberts' photographs entitled "Bruce Roberts, Photojournalist: 50 Years of Capturing Change" that featured photos from throughout his career, primarily focusing on pictures taken in North Carolina.

== Personal life ==
From 1958 through the mid-1980s, Bruce Roberts was married to Nancy Roberts, a renowned author. The two met when they both worked for the Charlotte Observer and married in 1958. The couple had a daughter, Nancy, and a son, David, during their marriage. David was born with Down Syndrome. which was chronicled in Bruce and Nancy's book David, published in 1968, describing their experiences with raising a child with Down Syndrome in the 1960s. They divorced in the mid-1980s with both Bruce and Nancy remarrying later on. Bruce Roberts married Cheryl Shelton, now Cheryl Shelton-Roberts, a retired schoolteacher, historian, and prolific researcher of North Carolina lighthouses, keepers’ genealogies, keepers’ families oral histories, lifesaving stations, and shipwrecks.

Roberts died in Newport, North Carolina on June 16, 2023, at the age of 93.

== Bibliography ==
Co-authored with Nancy Roberts

- Roberts, Nancy; Roberts, Bruce (1968). David. Richmond, Virginia: John Knox Press. OCLC 437075.
- Roberts, Nancy; Roberts, Bruce (1970). Where Time Stood Still: A Portrait of Appalachia. Crowell-Collier Press.
- Roberts, Nancy; Roberts, Bruce (1972). The Governor. Charlotte, North Carolina: McNally and Loftin. OCLC 417067.
- Roberts, Nancy; Roberts, Bruce (1973). Goodliest Land. Garden City, New York: Doubleday. ISBN 0-385-04302-3. OCLC 707066.
- Roberts, Bruce; Roberts, Nancy (1974). Ghosts and Specters: Ten Supernatural Stories. Garden City, New York: Doubleday. ISBN 0-385-07231-7. OCLC 802872.
- Roberts, Bruce; Roberts, Nancy (1976). America's Most Haunted Places. Garden City, New York: Doubleday. ISBN 0-385-09964-9. OCLC 1531988.
- Roberts, Nancy; Roberts, Bruce (1979). Southern Ghosts. Garden City, New York: Doubleday. ISBN 0-385-12813-4. OCLC 4884172.

Co-authored with Cheryl Shelton-Roberts

- Shelton-Roberts, Cheryl; Roberts, Bruce (1997). Lighthouse Families. Birmingham, Alabama: Crane Hill. ISBN 9781561646319.
- Roberts, Bruce; Yocum, Thomas; Shelton-Roberts, Cheryl (1999). Cape Hatteras: America's lighthouse. Nashville, Tennessee: Cumberland House. ISBN 1581820321.
- Shelton-Roberts, Cheryl; Roberts, Bruce (1999). Moving Hatteras: Relocating the Cape Hatteras Light Station to safety. Morehead City, North Carolina: Lighthouse Publications. ISBN 0967653703.
- Shelton-Roberts, Cheryl; Roberts, Bruce (2004). North Carolina lighthouses: A tribute of history and hope. Greensboro, North Carolina: Our State Books.
- Shelton-Roberts, Cheryl; Roberts, Bruce (2005). North Carolina Lighthouses: A Guidebook For All Existing North Carolina. Morehead City, North Carolina: Lighthouse Publications. ASIN B00MO0DMJK.
- Shelton-Roberts, Cheryl; Roberts, Bruce (2005). Cape Lookout National Seashore: Exploring the History and Wild Coastal Beauty. Morehead City, North Carolina: Lighthouse Publications.
- Shelton-Roberts, Cheryl; Roberts, Bruce; Branch, P (2006). Fort Macon State Park: An illustrated guidebook. Morehead City North Carolina: Lighthouse Publications.
- Shelton-Roberts, Cheryl; Roberts, Bruce (2009). Illustrated Timeline of the Cape Lookout Lighthouse. Lighthouse Publications. ISBN 978-0972998123.
- Shelton-Roberts, Cheryl; Roberts, Bruce (2011). North Carolina lighthouses: Stories of History and Hope. Guilford, Connecticut: Globe Peqout Press.
- Roberts, Bruce; Shelton-Roberts, Cheryl; Jones, Ray (2012). American lighthouses: A Comprehensive Guide to Exploring our National Coastal Treasures. Guilford, Connecticut: Globe Pequot Press. ISBN 978-0-7627-7960-4.
- Shelton-Roberts, Cheryl; Roberts, Bruce. Bodie Island Lighthouse: Its History and Restoration. Morehead City, North Carolina: Lighthouse Publications.

Other books

- Jones, Ray; Roberts, Bruce (1996). Mid-Atlantic lighthouses: Hudson River to Chesapeake Bay. Old Saybrook, Connecticut: Globe Pequot Press. ISBN 0-7627-3042-0.
- Butterworth-McKittrick, Norma E.; Roberts, Bruce (2001). Cape Henry, First Landing: First United States lighthouse. Morehead City, North Carolina: Lighthouse Publications.
- Roberts, Bruce; Jones, Ray (2002). Southern lighthouses: Outer Banks to Cape Florida. Guilford, Connecticut: Globe Pequot Press. ISBN 0-7627-1243-0.
- Roberts, Bruce; Jones, Ray (2002). American lighthouses: A definitive guide. Guilford, Connecticut: Globe Pequot Press. ISBN 978-0-7627-2269-3.
- Clunies, Sandra MacLean; Roberts, Bruce (2002). Pirates of the Southern Coast: Including the Infamous Blackbeard, Stede Bonnet, "Black Sam" Bellamy, "Calico Jack" Rackham, Charles Vane, Mary Read, Anne Bonny. Morehead City, North Carolina: Lighthouse Publications. ISBN 0967653762.
- Butterworth-McKittrick, Norma E.; Roberts, Bruce (2013). Lighthouse Ghosts and Carolina Coastal Legends. Pineapple Press, Incorporated. ISBN 978-1561646012.
- Butterworth-McKittrick, Norma E.; Roberts, Bruce (2014). Shipwrecks: Disasters and rescues of the Graveyard of the Atlantic and Cape Fear.
- Roberts, Bruce (2014). Just yesterday in North Carolina. Pineapple Press.
- Stick, David; Roberts, Bruce (2014). Just yesterday on the Outer Banks. Pineapple Press. ISBN 978-1561646999.
