= Beaufort Historic District =

Beaufort Historic District may refer to:

- Beaufort Historic District (Beaufort, North Carolina), listed on the NRHP in North Carolina
- Beaufort Historic District (Beaufort, South Carolina), a National Historic Landmark and listed on the NRHP in South Carolina
