= Royal C. Dunn =

American politician

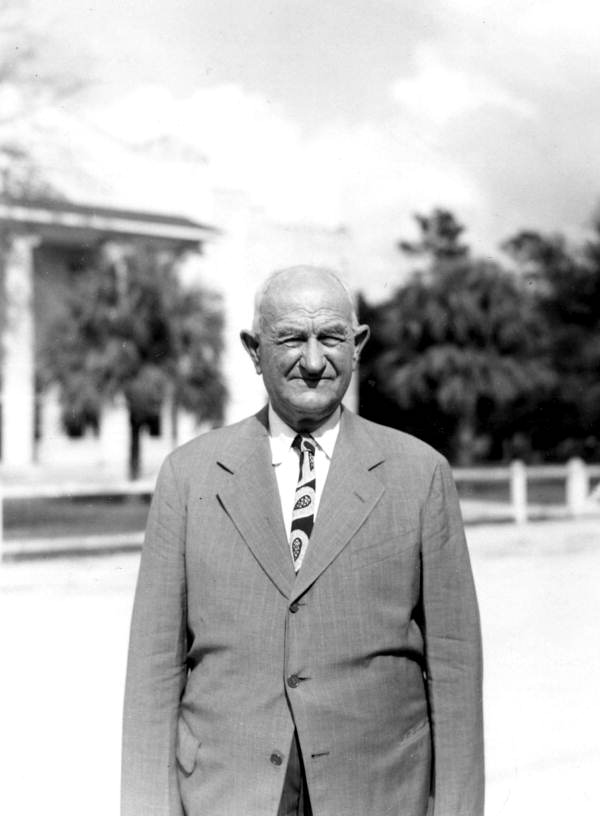
- Dunn in 1947

Member of the Florida House of Representatives from Dixie County
- In office 1947–1949

Personal details
- Born: September 18, 1875 Beaufort, North Carolina, U.S.
- Died: May 9, 1959 (aged 83)
- Party: Democratic

Royal C. Dunn (September 18, 1875 – May 9, 1959) was an American politician. He served as a Democratic member of the Florida House of Representatives.

== Life and career ==
Dunn was born in Beaufort, North Carolina. He was a railroad commissioner.

Dunn served in the Florida House of Representatives from 1947 to 1949.

Dunn died on May 9, 1959, at the age of 83.
