= Tiller School =

Coordinates: 34°44′6.5″N 76°38′3″W

Location
- 1950 US Highway 70 East; Beaufort, NC, Carteret County, North Carolina 28516

Information
- Type: Charter
- Founded: 1993
- Founder: Julie Burke
- Executive Director: Kelly Riley
- Teaching staff: 16
- Employees: 29
- Grades: K-5
- Gender: Co-educational
- Enrollment: 194 (2014–15)
- Average class size: 17
- Student to teacher ratio: 12.12:1
- Campus type: Suburban
- Mascot: Tilley the Turtle
- Newspaper: The Tiller Current
- Tuition: none
- Website: tillerschool.org

Tiller School is a non-profit charter school serving kindergarten through fifth grade in Beaufort, North Carolina.

== History ==
Tiller School was established by a group of parents and teachers in 1993 to provide a quality, enriched education for the children of Carteret County. The original school house was on Highway 24 in the building which now houses the North Carolina Coastal Federation's headquarters.

In the spring of 1998, Tiller School applied for and was granted charter status by the North Carolina Department of Instruction. Charter School status provides the school with per child public school funding for operating expenses.

== Admissions ==
Tiller School is a tuition free, public charter school. Any child who is qualified under the laws of North Carolina for admission to a public school is qualified for admission to a charter school. To qualify to attend a NC public school, a student must be a legal resident of North Carolina. County boundaries or school attendance areas do not affect charter school enrollment. Tiller School does not limit admission to students on the basis of intellectual ability, measures of achievement or aptitude, athletic ability, disability, race, creed, gender, national origin, religion or ancestry.

If the number of applications exceeds the number of available spaces, a lottery will be held to fill vacant seats for the next school year. After seats are filled, the drawing will continue to determine the order of a waiting list.

== Curriculum ==
The North Carolina Standard Course of Study is used as the basis for Tiller School curriculum .

In addition, Tiller School has adopted The Core Knowledge Sequence developed by E.D. Hirsch, who founded the Core Knowledge Foundation. Core Knowledge provides a clear outline of content to be learned Grade by Grade so that knowledge, language, and skills build cumulatively from year to year. This sequential building of knowledge not only helps ensure that children enter each new Grade ready to learn, it also helps prevent the repetitions and gaps that so often characterize current education.

Tiller School uses a clear social curriculum, known as Responsive Classroom built around six central components that integrate teaching, learning and caring in the daily program.

== Academics ==
In 2017 Tiller School was ranked 15th best public elementary school of 1,391 in North Carolina by Niche.com.
