= Matt Dodge =

American football player (born 1987)

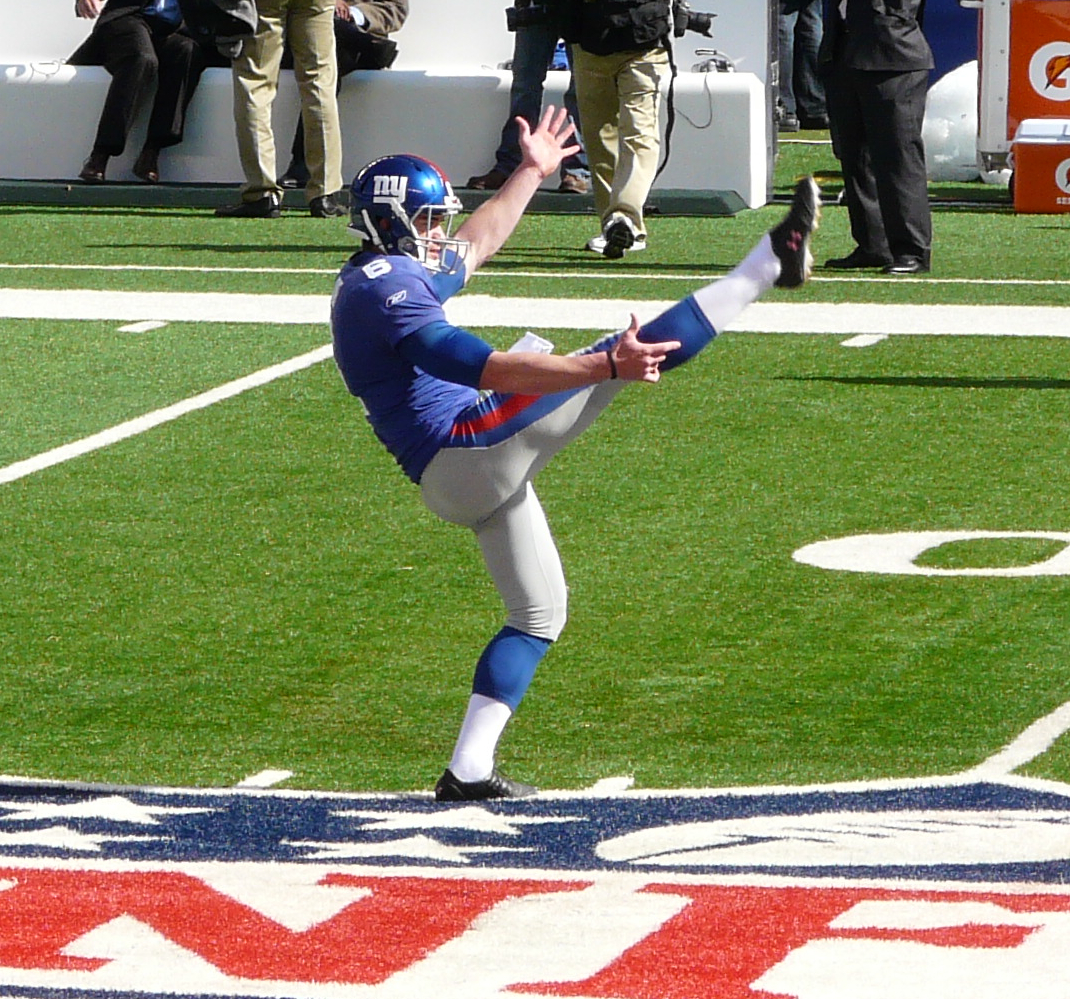
- Dodge with the New York Giants in 2010

No. 6
- Position: Punter

Personal information
- Born: May 30, 1987 (age 39); Morehead City, North Carolina, U.S.
- Listed height: 6 ft 1 in (1.85 m)
- Listed weight: 224 lb (102 kg)

Career information
- High school: West Carteret (NC)
- College: Appalachian State (2005); East Carolina (2006–2009)
- NFL draft: 2010: 7th round, 221st overall pick

Career history
- New York Giants (2010)

Awards and highlights
- NCAA Division I-AA champion (2005); Second-team All-American (2009); First-team All-C-USA (2009)

Career NFL statistics
- Punts: 72
- Punt yards: 3,222
- Punting yard average: 44.8
- Stats at Pro Football Reference

Matthew Dean Dodge (born May 30, 1987) is an American former professional football player who was a punter for the New York Giants of the National Football League (NFL). He was selected by the Giants in the seventh round of the 2010 NFL draft.

== Early life and college ==
Dodge was born in Morehead City, North Carolina, where he played multiple sports including football and soccer at West Carteret High School before attending Appalachian State University. He also dabbled in bodybuilding.

As a freshman at Appalachian State, Dodge was the punter for the 2005 NCAA Division I-AA National Championship-winning team. He later transferred to East Carolina University and was their punter for the 2007, 2008 and 2009 seasons. As a senior, he was named Second-team All-American after ranking second in the NCAA in yards per punt (45.8).

== Professional career ==
Dodge was projected to be drafted in the seventh round or signed as an undrafted free agent prior to the 2010 NFL draft.

Pre-draft measurables
Height	Weight	Arm length	Hand span	Vertical jump	Broad jump	Bench press
6 ft 1 1/2 in (1.87 m)	224 lb (102 kg)	32 in (0.81 m)	9 3/4 in (0.25 m)	34 in (0.86 m)	9 ft 6 in (2.90 m)	23 reps
All values from NFL Combine/Pro Day

Dodge was selected by the New York Giants in the seventh round (221st overall) of the 2010 NFL draft to replace long-time Giants punter Jeff Feagles, who had just retired. Dodge beat out Jy Bond for the punting job on June 21 when Bond was waived from the team. Dodge was signed to a four-year contract on June 23.

Dodge's first professional punt was blocked in a Monday night preseason game against the New York Jets. During a game against the Philadelphia Eagles on December 19, 2010, Dodge had a 36-yard punt that was returned by DeSean Jackson for a touchdown as time expired, giving the Eagles a 38−31 win in a game later called "The Punt" by Giants fans and "The Miracle at the New Meadowlands" by Eagles fans. Shortly after the winning touchdown, Dodge was seen publicly chastised by his head coach, Tom Coughlin, for failing to punt the ball out of bounds.

On September 3, 2011, Dodge was released from the Giants in favor of former New York Jets punter Steve Weatherford.

Dodge tried out with multiple NFL teams including the Chicago Bears until 2013, but did not receive a contract. Dodge recalled in 2016 that he "punted okay but they could tell that I wasn't sold out for it and they looked at me and were like, 'Matt, do you want to do this?' Like, they asked me straight up, 'Do you want to do this? Because you can't pretend.' At that time I was like, 'I really don't.' And it was a very freeing feeling. It released me from the grasp of the NFL machine as being the best part of my life."

=== NFL career statistics ===
Year	Team	Punting															
Year	Team	GP	Punts	Yds	Net Yds	Lng	Avg	Net Avg	Blk	OOB	Dn	Ins20	TB	FC	Ret	RetY	TD
2010	NYG	16	72	3,222	3,222	69	44.8	34.8	1	0	0	0	0	0	36	535	1
Career		16	72	3,222	3,222	69	44.8	34.8	1	0	0	0	0	0	36	535	1

== Personal life ==
Dodge married his wife Allison in July 2015.

During his NFL team tryouts, Dodge resumed bodybuilding and entered various competitions along with working as a personal trainer. He later became a wealth management consultant and author.
