= East Carteret High School =

American public school in North Carolina

Location
- 3263 Highway 70 East; Beaufort, North Carolina 28516; United States
- Coordinates: 34°46′54″N 76°37′52″W

Information
- Type: Public
- Motto: Bridging Heritage and Horizons
- School district: Carteret County Public Schools
- CEEB code: 340260
- Principal: James Westbrook III
- Staff: 30.05 (FTE)
- Enrollment: 521 (2024-2025)
- Student to teacher ratio: 17.34
- Colors: Blue, gold, and white
- Team name: Mariners
- Rival: West Carteret High School
- Website: echs.carteretcountyschools.org

East Carteret High School is a public high school located in Beaufort, North Carolina. It serves 13 Down East communities, Merrimon, South River, North River, and Beaufort. Harkers Island is zoned to East Carteret High.

== Athletics ==
East Carteret High School athletics teams compete in the Coastal Plains Conference. Their colors are gold, blue, and white and their mascot is the mariner. East Carteret offers baseball, basketball, football, soccer, softball, tennis, wrestling, and volleyball.

== Demographics ==
As of the 2018–2019 school year, East Carteret enrolled 526 students. 422 identified as white, 54 identified as black, 22 identified as multiracial, 17 identified as Hispanic, seven identified as Asian, two identified as American Indian/Alaska Native, and two identified as Native Hawaiian/Pacific Islander.
