= Duncan House (Beaufort, North Carolina) =

House in Beaufort, North Carolina

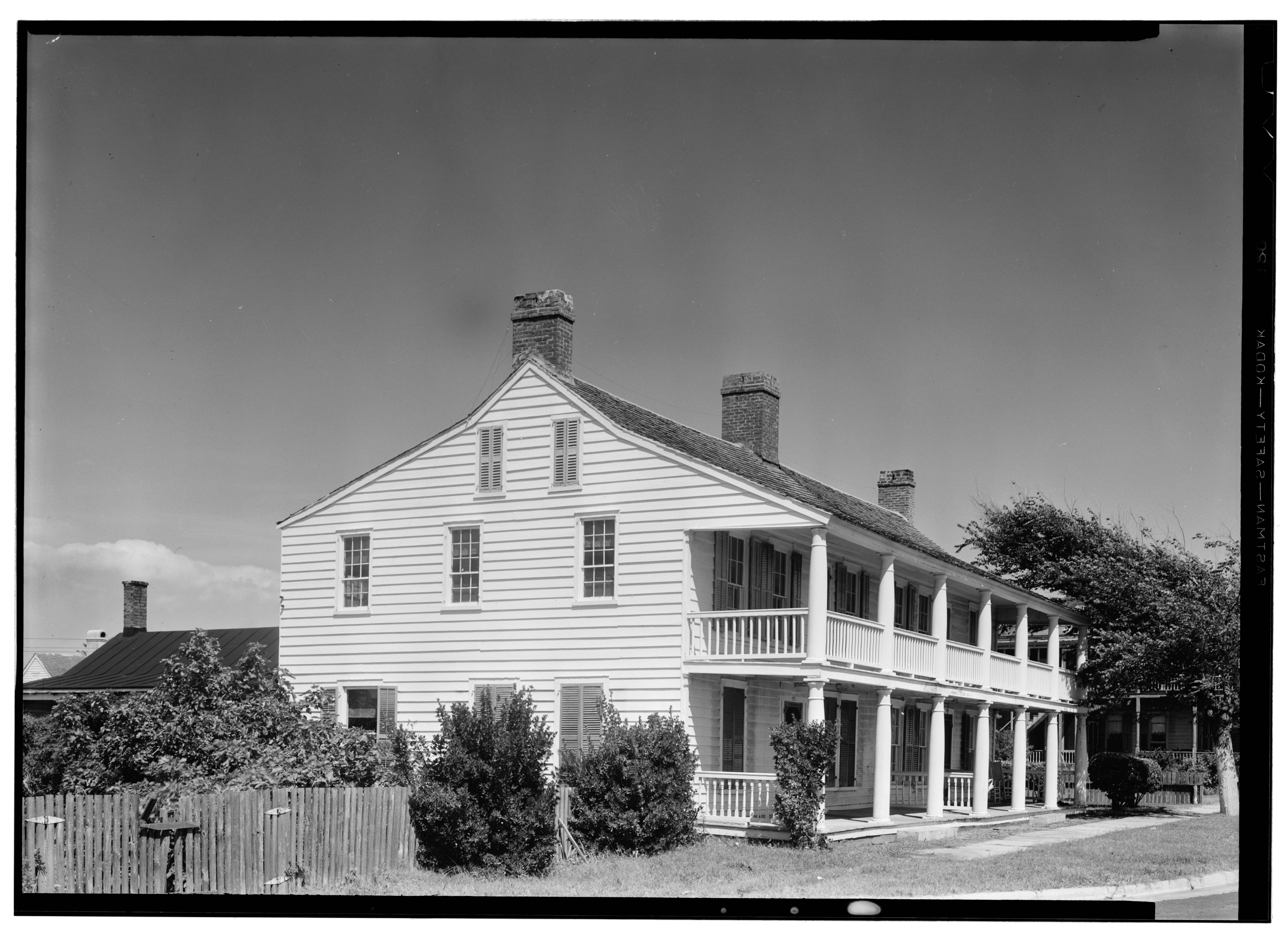
- The house in 1940
- Location: 105 Front Street; Beaufort, North Carolina, U.S.
- Built: 1728
- Architectural style: Federal
- Demolished: December 15, 2025

The Duncan House was a historic house in Beaufort, North Carolina. It was part of the Beaufort Historic District and was listed on the National Register of Historic Places. The house was destroyed by a fire on December 15, 2025.

== History ==
The Duncan House was built in 1728. Additions were made to the home around 1810. It was located at 105 Front Street in the Beaufort Historic District. It was listed on the National Register of Historic Places and was one of eleven properties in North Carolina that was designated as a Statewide Property of Significance.

A fire broke out at the house at about 6:30 AM on December 15, 2025. The house was destroyed by the blaze.
