= West Carteret High School =

American public school in North Carolina

Location
- 4700 Country Club Road; Morehead City, North Carolina 28557; United States; 34°44′15″N 76°47′09″W

Information
- School type: Public
- Founded: 1964 (62 years ago)
- CEEB code: 342720
- Principal: Justin Holt
- Teaching staff: 69.03 (FTE)
- Grades: 9–12
- Enrollment: 1,097 (2023-2024)
- Student to teacher ratio: 15.89
- Colors: Red, white, and blue
- Team name: Patriots
- Rival: East Carteret High School
- Website: wchs.carteretcountyschools.org

West Carteret High School is a public secondary school located in Morehead City, North Carolina on Country Club Road, and is part of the Carteret County Public Schools system. The school serves the student populations of Morehead City, Newport, Atlantic Beach, and surrounding areas. It opened in 1964, and has since grown to be the largest high school in Carteret County, NC. Its school mascot is Pete the Patriot.

West Carteret High School was recognized by the state of North Carolina in the 2009–2010 school year, and then again in the 2010–2011 school year, as an Honor School of Excellence. This represents the highest ranking possible with at least 90% of students at grade level and making adequate yearly progress (AYP).

In 2012–2013, the West Carteret's Marching Band, the Marching Patriots, were invited to Orlando, Florida, as the featured performers in the 2012 Disney Christmas Day Parade on Main Street, and were broadcast on live television December 25, 2012.

In April of 2025, the West Carteret Marching Band was selected as the featured ensemble in the Washington, DC, National Cherry Blossom Festival Parade.

== Notable alumni ==
- Xavier Ware - Professional Drummer, Bilmuri, Suicidal Tendancies & Pearl Drums Artist, West Carteret Bands Alumni
- Michael Anderson - 2x Grammy Nominated, Professional Drummer, Building 429 West Carteret Bands Alumni
- Captain Brandon Hults - Conductor, United States Air Force Band Washington, DC, United States Air Force Academy Band West Carteret Band Alumni
- Lonnie Chisenhall — former MLB third baseman and outfielder
- Matt Dodge — former NFL punter
- Vaughan Johnson — former NFL linebacker, member of New Orleans Saints Hall of Fame
- Chip Peterson — swimmer, specializes in long-distance freestyle swimming, open water swimming world champion
- Cooper Webb — professional motocross and supercross racer
