= Nancy Roberts (author) =

American writer (1924–2008)

Nancy Roberts (née MacRae Correll, 1924 – July 1, 2008) was an American writer and storyteller who was often described as the "First Lady of American Folklore." A best selling author, she presented storytelling programs and lectures on creative writing at clubs, public libraries, schools, and universities. The author of over two dozen books, Roberts began writing ghost stories for the Charlotte Observer. Carl Sandburg encouraged her to publish her stories as a book. In 1958 she followed his advice and her books have sold over one million copies earning her national recognition including a nomination for the Great Western Writers iSpur Award and a certificate of commendation from the American Association for State and Local History.

Southern Living magazine described her as the "custodian of the twilight zone."

Nancy MacRae Correll was born in Milwaukee, Wisconsin to Milton Correll and Maud MacRae. Her family was originally from North Carolina and Nancy returned to the state in the 1950s. Early in her career, she owned a newspaper in Maxton, North Carolina called the Scottish Chief. During this time, she hired photographer Bruce Roberts to work on the paper. They subsequently married, but divorced in the 1980s. They had two children. Her next marriage to Jim Brown lasted until her death 30 years later. They enjoyed traveling around the country researching material for her books. She was a devout Christian and became an ordained minister during this time. She continued writing books and stories until a few months before her death on July 1, 2008. Her final resting place is at Sharon Memorial Cemetery in Charlotte, North Carolina.

== Books by Nancy Roberts ==
- America's Most Haunted Places by Bruce Roberts, Nancy Roberts (Garden City, N.Y. : Doubleday, 1976) ISBN 0-385-09964-9, OCLC: 1531988
- Animal Ghost Stories by Nancy Roberts (Little Rock, Arkansas : August House, 1995) ISBN 0-87483-401-5, OCLC: 32311899
- Appalachian Ghosts by Nancy Roberts (Garden City, N.Y. : Doubleday, 1978) ISBN 0-38512-2942
- Blackbeard and Other Pirates of the Atlantic Coast by Nancy Roberts (Winston-Salem, NC : J.F. Blair, ©1993) ISBN 0-89587-098-3, OCLC: 27725606
- Blackbeard's Cat, ISBN 1-886391-40-8, Library of Congress Card Catalog Number 98-068229
- Civil War Ghost Stories and Legends by Nancy Roberts (Columbia, S.C. : University of South Carolina Press, ©1992) ISBN 0-87249-851-4, OCLC: 25628262
- David by Nancy Roberts, Bruce Roberts (Richmond, Virginia : John Knox Press [1968]) OCLC: 437075
- The Faces of South Carolina by Nancy Roberts (Garden City, N.Y. : Doubleday, 1976) ISBN 0-385-07752-1, OCLC: 2121061
- Georgia Ghosts by Nancy Roberts (Winston-Salem N.C. : John F. Blair, Publisher, ©1997) ISBN 0-89587-172-6, OCLC: 36807527
- Ghosts and Specters: ten supernatural stories by Bruce Roberts, Nancy Roberts (Garden City, N.Y. : Doubleday [1974]) ISBN 0-385-07231-7, OCLC: 802872
- Ghosts from the Coast by Nancy Roberts (Chapel Hill, North Carolina : University of North Carolina Press, ©2001) ISBN 0-8078-2665-0, OCLC: 46634396
- Ghosts of the Carolinas by Nancy Roberts (Columbia, S.C. : University of South Carolina Press, ©1988) ISBN 0-87249-586-8, OCLC: 18351912
- Ghosts of the Southern Mountains and Appalachia by Nancy Roberts (Columbia, South Carolina : University of South Carolina Press, ©1988) ISBN 0-87249-597-3, OCLC: 18380668
- Ghosts of the Wild West by Nancy Roberts (Columbia : University of South Carolina Press, ©2008) ISBN 978-1-57003-731-3, OCLC: 183879290
- The Gold Seekers : gold, ghosts, and legends from Carolina to California by Nancy Roberts (Columbia, S.C. : University of South Carolina Press, ©1989) ISBN 0-87249-658-9, OCLC: 20264555
- Goodliest Land by Nancy Roberts, Bruce Roberts (Garden City, New York : Doubleday, 1973) ISBN 0-385-04302-3, OCLC: 707066
- The Governor by Nancy Roberts, Bruce Roberts (Charlotte [N.C.] McNally and Loftin, 1972) OCLC: 417067
- Haunted houses : tales from 30 American homes by Nancy Roberts (Chester, Conn.: Globe Pequot Press, ©1988) ISBN 0-87106-775-7, OCLC: 16466049
- The Haunted South by Nancy Roberts (New York : Barnes & Noble, Inc., by arrangement with Univ. of South Carolina Press, 1996) ISBN 0760703671, OCLC: 37104698
- North Carolina Ghosts and Legends by Nancy Roberts (Columbia, South Carolina : University of South Carolina Press, ©1991) ISBN 0-87249-764-X, OCLC: 23462085
- South Carolina ghosts : from the coast to the mountains by Nancy Roberts (Columbia, S.C. : University of South Carolina Press, ©1983) ISBN 0872494284, OCLC: 10752542
- Southern Ghosts by Nancy Roberts, Bruce Roberts (Garden City, New York : Doubleday, ©1979) ISBN 0-385-12813-4, OCLC: 4884172

== Visual Material by Nancy Roberts ==
- Pirates of the Carolinas by Nancy Roberts Southeastern Filmstrips, Inc.; Nancy Roberts Southern Collection (Charlotte, NC : Nancy Roberts Southern Collection, Ltd., ©1980), OCLC: 26245369
