= Carteret County Home =

- U.S. National Register of Historic Places
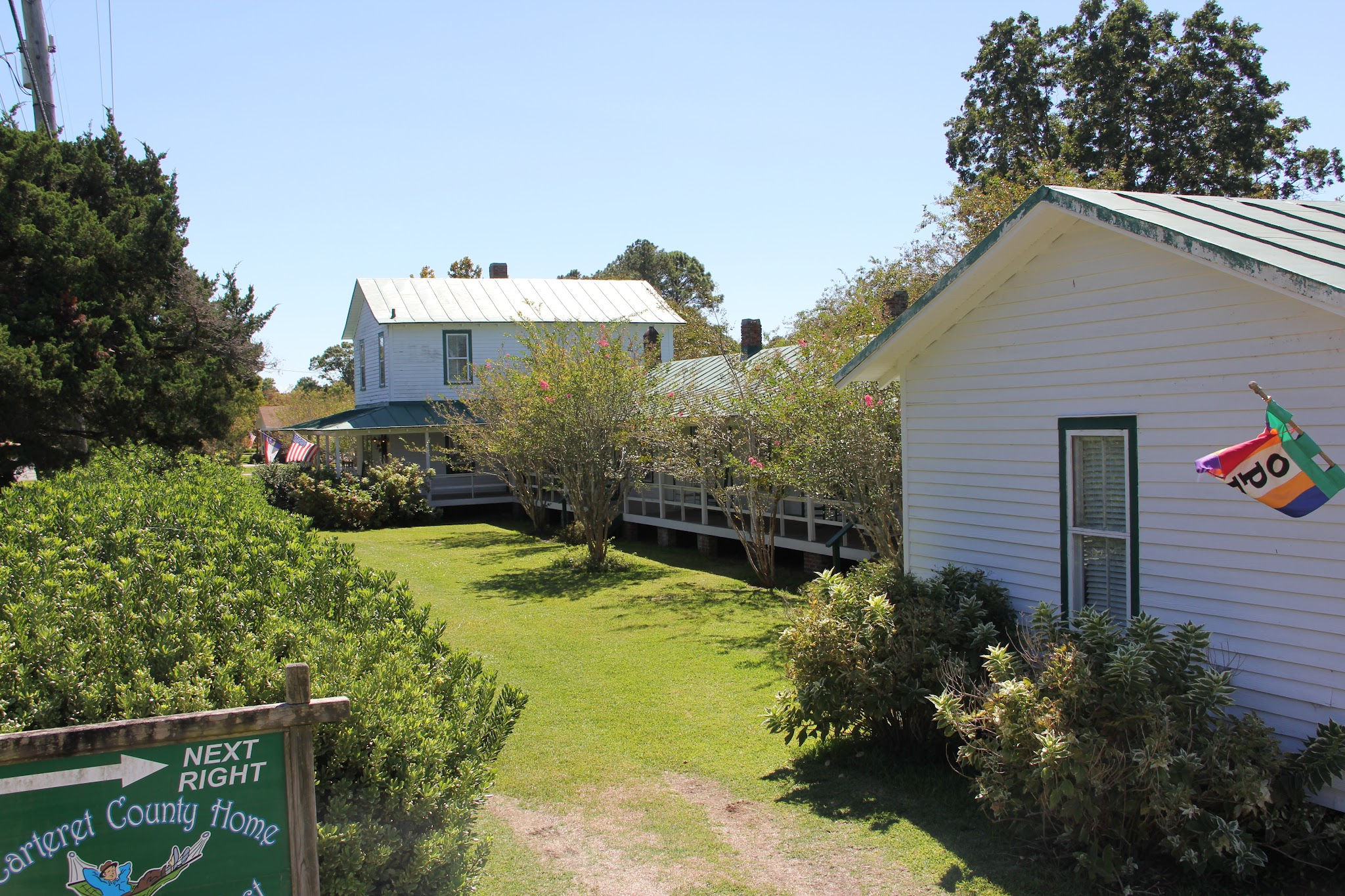
- Carteret County Home, September 2012

- Location within North Carolina Location within the United States
- Location: NC 101, Beaufort, North Carolina
- Coordinates: 34°43′42″N 76°38′58″W
- Area: 1 acre (0.40 ha)
- Built: 1914
- Built by: Simpson, Clarence
- NRHP reference No.: 84000528
- Added to NRHP: December 20, 1984

Carteret County Home is a historic poorhouse located at Beaufort, Carteret County, North Carolina. It was built in 1914, and enlarged in 1917. It is a one-story gable-front frame structure with a two-story center section patterned after the hall and parlor plan. The Carteret County Home operated until 1943, and later converted to apartments.

It was listed on the National Register of Historic Places in 1994.
