= Peletier, North Carolina =

- Town
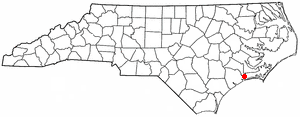
- Location of Peletier, North Carolina
- Coordinates: 34°43′37″N 77°04′33″W
- Country: United States
- State: North Carolina
- County: Carteret

Area
  - Total: 3.68 sq mi (9.53 km^{2})
  - Land: 3.62 sq mi (9.37 km^{2})
  - Water: 0.062 sq mi (0.16 km^{2})
- Elevation: 30 ft (9.1 m)

Population (2020)
  - Total: 769
  - Density: 212.6/sq mi (82.07/km^{2})
- Time zone: UTC-5 (Eastern (EST))
  - Summer (DST): UTC-4 (EDT)
- FIPS code: 37-51040
- GNIS feature ID: 2407090
- Website: www.townofpeletiernc.com

Peletier is a town in Carteret County, North Carolina, United States. As of the 2020 census, Peletier had a population of 769.

The town was named for the late-18th century Pelletier family.

== Geography ==
Peletier is located in western Carteret County. It is bordered to the south by the towns of Cape Carteret and Cedar Point. To the west is the tidal White Oak River, which forms the Carteret/Onslow County line. To the north and east is Croatan National Forest.

North Carolina Highway 58 passes through Peletier, leading south 5 miles (8 km) to Emerald Isle on the Atlantic shoreline, and northwest 15 miles (24 km) to Maysville and U.S. Route 17.

According to the United States Census Bureau, the town has a total area of 3.7 square miles (9.5 km^{2}), of which 3.6 square miles (9.4 km^{2}) is land and 0.04 square miles (0.1 km^{2}), or 1.56%, is water.

== Demographics ==
Historical population
| Census | Pop. | Note | %± |
|---|---|---|---|
| 2000 | 487 | | — |
| 2010 | 644 | | 32.2% |
| 2020 | 769 | | 19.4% |
U.S. Decennial Census

As of the census of 2000, there were 487 people, 206 households, and 146 families residing in the town. The population density was 148.2 inhabitants per square mile (57.2/km^{2}). There were 282 housing units at an average density of 85.8 per square mile (33.1/km^{2}). The racial makeup of the town was 97.13% White, 0.62% African American, 0.62% Native American and 1.64% Asian. Hispanic or Latino of any race were 1.03% of the population.

There were 206 households, out of which 29.6% had children under the age of 18 living with them, 56.3% were married couples living together, 8.7% had a female householder with no husband present, and 29.1% were non-families. 21.8% of all households were made up of individuals, and 10.7% had someone living alone who was 65 years of age or older. The average household size was 2.36 and the average family size was 2.74.

In the town, the population was spread out, with 22.8% under the age of 18, 6.6% from 18 to 24, 25.7% from 25 to 44, 24.4% from 45 to 64, and 20.5% who were 65 years of age or older. The median age was 42 years. For every 100 females, there were 102.1 males. For every 100 females age 18 and over, there were 96.9 males.

The median income for a household in the town was $33,641, and the median income for a family was $34,653. Males had a median income of $25,250 versus $16,667 for females. The per capita income for the town was $17,484. About 9.9% of families and 11.1% of the population were below the poverty line, including 11.5% of those under age 18 and 8.4% of those age 65 or over.
