= Jacob Henry House =

Historic house in North Carolina, United States

- U.S. National Register of Historic Places
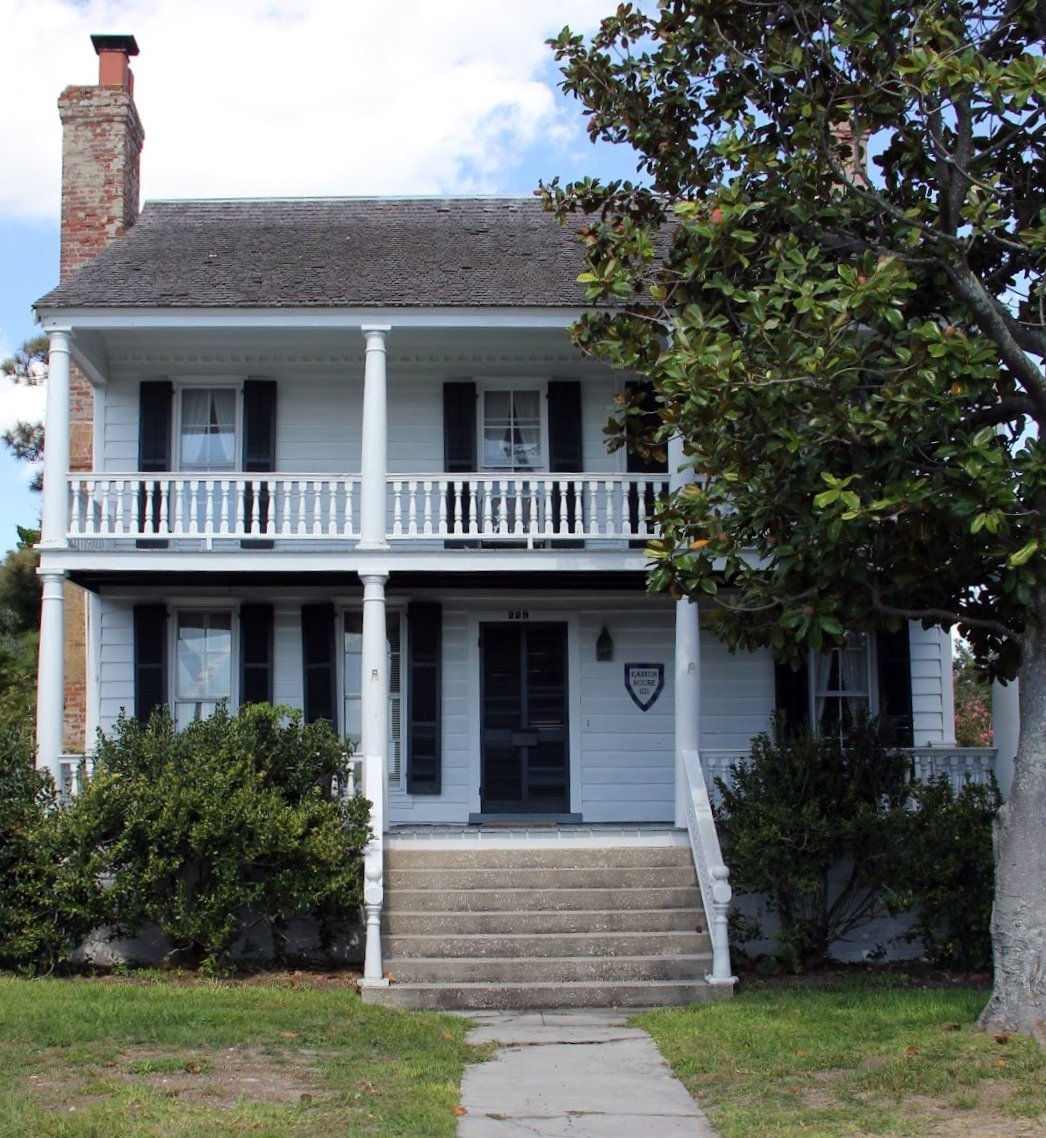
- Jacob Henry House, September 2012

- Location within North Carolina Location within the United States
- Location: 229 Front St., Beaufort, North Carolina
- Coordinates: 34°43′4″N 76°40′4″W
- Area: less than one acre
- Built: 1794
- Architectural style: Federal
- NRHP reference No.: 73001303
- Added to NRHP: May 7, 1973

Jacob Henry House is a historic home located at Beaufort, Carteret County, North Carolina. It was built about 1794, and is a 2 1/2-story, four bay by four bay, Federal style frame dwelling. It rests on a high foundation of ballast stone and has a two-tier, full-width front porch. It was the home of Jacob Henry, who in 1809 entered into a debate over his right as a Jew to hold state office. Henry served in the North Carolina legislature in 1808 and 1809.

It was listed on the National Register of Historic Places in 1973.
