= Gibbs House (Beaufort, North Carolina) =

Historic house in North Carolina, United States

- U.S. National Register of Historic Places
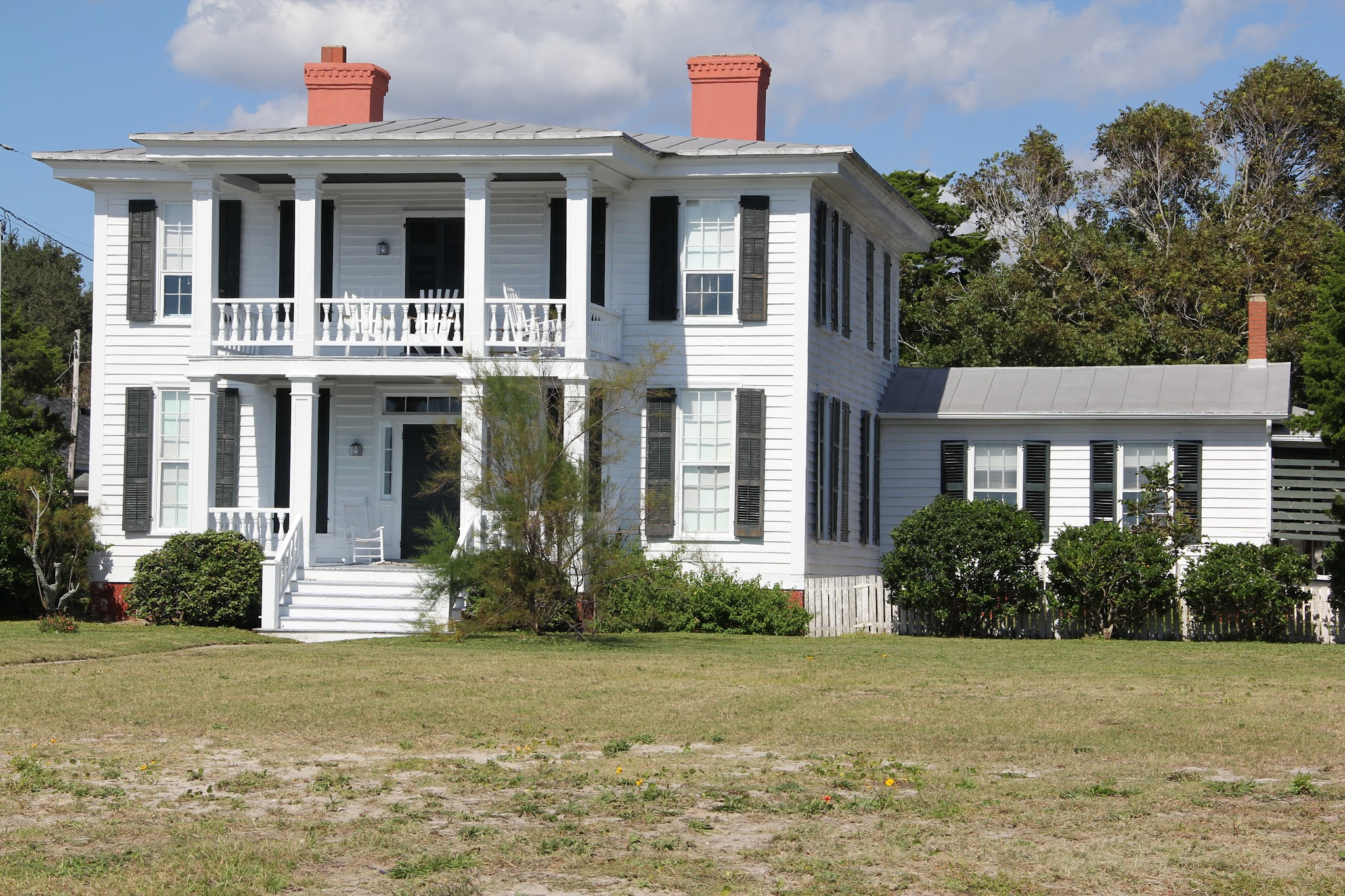
- Gibbs House, September 2012

- Location within North Carolina Location within the United States
- Location: 903 Front St., Beaufort, North Carolina
- Coordinates: 34°42′50″N 76°39′34″W
- Area: less than one acre
- Built: 1851
- Architectural style: Greek Revival
- NRHP reference No.: 73001302
- Added to NRHP: March 14, 1973

Gibbs House is a historic home located at Beaufort, Carteret County, North Carolina. It was built about 1851, and is a two-story, five bay by four bay, nearly square Greek Revival style dwelling. It features a two-tier porch with four paneled posts. The house was used in the 1880s by marine scientists from the Johns Hopkins University. The Johns Hopkins Seaside Laboratory operated here for some ten years, probably the first school of marine biology in the United States.

It was listed on the National Register of Historic Places in 1973.
