= Newport, North Carolina =

- Town
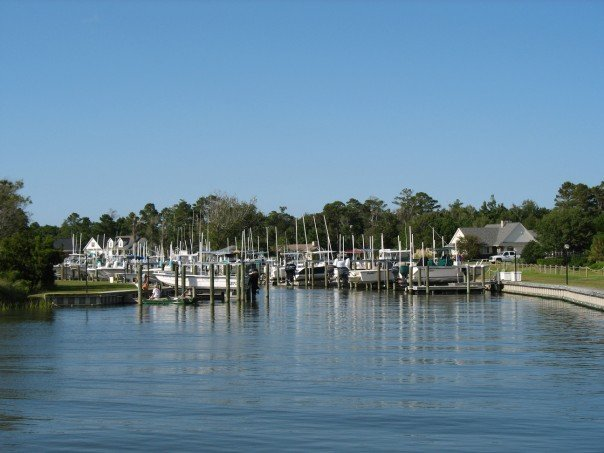
- A private boat harbor in Newport, NC

- Seal
- Motto: "The town with old-fashioned courtesy"
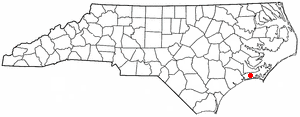
- Location of Newport, North Carolina
- Coordinates: 34°45′52″N 76°52′00″W
- Country: United States
- State: North Carolina
- County: Carteret

Area
  - Total: 7.75 sq mi (20.08 km^{2})
  - Land: 7.69 sq mi (19.91 km^{2})
  - Water: 0.062 sq mi (0.16 km^{2})
- Elevation: 23 ft (7.0 m)

Population (2020)
  - Total: 4,364
  - Density: 567.6/sq mi (219.14/km^{2})
- Time zone: UTC-5 (Eastern (EST))
  - Summer (DST): UTC-4 (EDT)
- ZIP code: 28570
- Area code: 252
- FIPS code: 37-46860
- GNIS feature ID: 2406988
- Website: www.newportnc.gov

Newport is a town in Carteret County, North Carolina, United States. The population was 4,364 at the 2020 census.

== History ==
Newport was officially chartered in 1866. Although the crossroads community on the Newport River was known by that name decades earlier, the area was also known as Bell's Corner and Shepardsville in earlier years. It was the location of the Newport Barracks, a Union camp during the American Civil War.

It was also called Shepardsville, in the early 18th century, for Shepard, a local landowner. The naming of "Newport" can be traced to two prevalent theories: the town was called "New Port" to distinguish it from the "Old Port " of Beaufort, N.C.; and the early influx of Quakers from Rhode Island called the town "Newport" in honor of their native Newport, R.I..

Early industry included agriculture, logging, and naval stores, including turpentine production. During the town's early history, the Newport River was navigable all the way to Old Topsail Inlet, now known as Beaufort Inlet, which opens to the Atlantic Ocean. The town was home to one of the earliest organized churches in Carteret County, the Newport River Primitive Baptist Church, established 1778. The structure was burned near the end of the Civil War but was soon rebuilt on the corner of Haskett Street and New Bern Street and remains active today.

In 1858, the Atlantic and North Carolina Railroad was completed when the final 96-mile (154 km) stretch of rail from Goldsboro through Newport to Beaufort was laid. The community is also the site of numerous Civil War battlefields, forts, and strategic locations. Newport was occupied by Union forces for much of the war.

Part of the town's residential area known as the "housing project" was originally developed as housing for civil service employees and military serving at nearby Marine Corps Air Station Cherry Point.

== Newport today ==
The town government operates as a council–manager government form with a mayor, a town manager, and a five-member town council. Members serve staggered terms.

The town is protected by a paid fire department with an active volunteer force, founded in the 1940s by Leon Mann, Jr. The department also provides emergency medical and ambulance services.

Public schools in Newport include the Carteret Pre-K Center, Newport Elementary School, and Newport Middle School. Newport Consolidated School, a first-through-12th-grade school established in 1926, was demolished in 1966 after the county completed construction of a new consolidated high school, West Carteret High in nearby Morehead City. Members of the Newport Consolidated School Alumni Association operate a small school museum in a depot warehouse owned by the North Carolina Railroad in Newport.

== Geography ==
Newport is located in west-central Carteret County. U.S. Route 70, a four-lane highway, passes through the town west of the center; it leads southeast 10 miles (16 km) to Morehead City and north 7 miles (11 km) to Havelock. New Bern is 25 miles (40 km) to the north up US-70.

According to the United States Census Bureau, Newport has a total area of 7.7 square miles (20.0 km^{2}), of which 7.7 square miles (19.9 km^{2}) is land and 0.08 square miles (0.2 km^{2}), or 0.85%, is water.

=== Climate ===
Climate data for Newport, North Carolina (1991–2020 normals, extremes 1996–present)
Month	Jan	Feb	Mar	Apr	May	Jun	Jul	Aug	Sep	Oct	Nov	Dec	Year
Record high °F (°C)	78 (26)	81 (27)	85 (29)	88 (31)	97 (36)	100 (38)	101 (38)	99 (37)	94 (34)	93 (34)	85 (29)	80 (27)	101 (38)
Mean daily maximum °F (°C)	54.3 (12.4)	56.8 (13.8)	63.1 (17.3)	71.0 (21.7)	78.3 (25.7)	83.8 (28.8)	87.1 (30.6)	86.6 (30.3)	82.0 (27.8)	73.9 (23.3)	65.4 (18.6)	58.6 (14.8)	71.7 (22.1)
Daily mean °F (°C)	44.0 (6.7)	46.4 (8.0)	52.1 (11.2)	60.3 (15.7)	68.4 (20.2)	75.5 (24.2)	79.2 (26.2)	78.4 (25.8)	73.6 (23.1)	64.0 (17.8)	54.2 (12.3)	47.6 (8.7)	62.0 (16.7)
Mean daily minimum °F (°C)	33.7 (0.9)	35.9 (2.2)	41.2 (5.1)	49.6 (9.8)	58.6 (14.8)	67.2 (19.6)	71.2 (21.8)	70.1 (21.2)	65.2 (18.4)	54.2 (12.3)	43.0 (6.1)	36.0 (2.2)	52.2 (11.2)
Record low °F (°C)	8 (−13)	10 (−12)	15 (−9)	24 (−4)	37 (3)	46 (8)	53 (12)	54 (12)	43 (6)	28 (−2)	20 (−7)	15 (−9)	8 (−13)
Average precipitation inches (mm)	4.61 (117)	4.14 (105)	3.67 (93)	3.52 (89)	3.22 (82)	5.00 (127)	5.97 (152)	7.75 (197)	9.57 (243)	4.44 (113)	4.78 (121)	3.97 (101)	60.64 (1,540)
Average precipitation days (≥ 0.01 in)	10.8	11.6	10.8	9.8	9.6	11.9	11.4	14.7	12.3	8.6	10.3	11.8	133.6
Source: NOAA

== Demographics ==
Historical population
Census	Pop.	Note	%±
1870	121		—
1880	165		36.4%
1890	218		32.1%
1900	328		50.5%
1910	321		−2.1%
1920	404		25.9%
1930	481		19.1%
1940	480		−0.2%
1950	676		40.8%
1960	861		27.4%
1970	1,735		101.5%
1980	1,883		8.5%
1990	2,516		33.6%
2000	3,349		33.1%
2010	4,150		23.9%
2020	4,364		5.2%
U.S. Decennial Census

=== 2020 census ===
As of the 2020 census, Newport had a population of 4,364. The median age was 42.9 years. 17.7% of residents were under the age of 18 and 20.1% of residents were 65 years of age or older. For every 100 females there were 102.2 males, and for every 100 females age 18 and over there were 101.9 males age 18 and over.

91.4% of residents lived in urban areas, while 8.6% lived in rural areas.

There were 1,718 households in Newport, of which 26.1% had children under the age of 18 living in them. There were 1,161 families residing in the town. Of all households, 43.7% were married-couple households, 19.7% were households with a male householder and no spouse or partner present, and 29.7% were households with a female householder and no spouse or partner present. About 32.7% of all households were made up of individuals and 16.0% had someone living alone who was 65 years of age or older.

There were 1,918 housing units, of which 10.4% were vacant. The homeowner vacancy rate was 2.3% and the rental vacancy rate was 12.1%.

Newport racial composition
Race	Number	Percentage
White (non-Hispanic)	3,281	75.18%
Black or African American (non-Hispanic)	453	10.38%
Native American	28	0.64%
Asian	117	2.68%
Pacific Islander	11	0.25%
Other/Mixed	281	6.44%
Hispanic or Latino	193	4.42%

=== 2000 census ===
As of the census of 2000, there were 3,349 people, 1,136 households, and 831 families residing in the town. The population density was 456.0 inhabitants per square mile (176.1/km^{2}). There were 1,232 housing units at an average density of 167.7 per square mile (64.7/km^{2}). The racial makeup of the town was 83.13% White, 11.94% African American, 0.63% Native American, 1.28% Asian, 0.03% Pacific Islander, 1.43% from other races, and 1.55% from two or more races. Hispanic or Latino of any race were 3.70% of the population.

There were 1,136 households, out of which 36.9% had children under the age of 18 living with them, 58.8% were married couples living together, 10.4% had a female householder with no husband present, and 26.8% were non-families. 23.2% of all households were made up of individuals, and 7.3% had someone living alone who was 65 years of age or older. The average household size was 2.58, and the average family size was 3.04.

In the town, the population was spread out, with 24.6% under the age of 18, 7.4% from 18 to 24, 32.5% from 25 to 44, 22.4% from 45 to 64, and 13.1% who were 65 years of age or older. The median age was 37 years. For every 100 females, there were 107.1 males. For every 100 females age 18 and over, there were 109.5 males.

The median income for a household in the town was $36,629, and the median income for a family was $43,147. Males had a median income of $30,408 versus $17,063 for females. The per capita income for the town was $14,260. About 6.6% of families and 10.0% of the population were below the poverty line, including 12.8% of those under age 18 and 10.6% of those age 65 or over.
