= Cedar Point, North Carolina =

- Town
- Seal

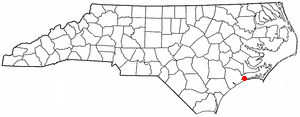
- Location of Cedar Point, North Carolina
- Coordinates: 34°41′11″N 77°05′00″W
- Country: United States
- State: North Carolina
- County: Carteret

Area
  - Total: 2.29 sq mi (5.94 km^{2})
  - Land: 2.22 sq mi (5.76 km^{2})
  - Water: 0.069 sq mi (0.18 km^{2})
- Elevation: 20 ft (6.1 m)

Population (2020)
  - Total: 1,764
  - Density: 793.2/sq mi (306.25/km^{2})
- Time zone: UTC-5 (Eastern (EST))
  - Summer (DST): UTC-4 (EDT)
- ZIP code: 28584
- FIPS code: 37-11340
- GNIS feature ID: 2406242
- Website: cedarpointnc.gov

Cedar Point is a town in Carteret County, North Carolina, United States. At the 2020 census, the population was 1,764. In 2022, the population estimate was 2,198.

In 2024, real estate developers in Cedar Point disturbed the site of an ancient Native American settlement. The discovery led to controversy over the continuance of the housing development and calls for new regulations to protect historical sites. Several state lawmakers pushed for construction to resume, with one legislator receiving campaign contributions from the project's developers in 2022.

== Geography ==
Cedar Point is located at the western end of Carteret County. It is bordered to the north by the town of Peletier and to the east by the town of Cape Carteret. To the south is Bogue Sound, crossed by the B. Cameron Langston Bridge to Emerald Isle, and to the west is the tidal White Oak River, crossed by North Carolina Highway 24, leading to the town of Swansboro in Onslow County.

According to the United States Census Bureau, the town of Cedar Point has a total area of 2.2 square miles (5.7 km^{2}), of which 0.004 square miles (0.01 km^{2}), or 0.23%, is water.

== Demographics ==
Historical population
Census	Pop.	Note	%±
1990	628		—
2000	929		47.9%
2010	1,279		37.7%
2020	1,764		37.9%
U.S. Decennial Census

=== 2020 census ===
Cedar Point racial composition
Race	Number	Percentage
White (non-Hispanic)	1,516	85.94%
Black or African American (non-Hispanic)	17	0.96%
Native American	8	0.45%
Asian	17	0.96%
Pacific Islander	1	0.06%
Other/Mixed	121	6.86%
Hispanic or Latino	84	4.76%

As of the 2020 census, Cedar Point had a population of 1,764. The median age was 45.3 years. 23.6% of residents were under the age of 18 and 20.6% of residents were 65 years of age or older. For every 100 females there were 88.3 males, and for every 100 females age 18 and over there were 86.8 males age 18 and over.

100.0% of residents lived in urban areas, while 0.0% lived in rural areas.

There were 719 households in Cedar Point, including 557 family households, and 32.0% had children under the age of 18 living in them. Of all households, 60.9% were married-couple households, 13.1% were households with a male householder and no spouse or partner present, and 22.9% were households with a female householder and no spouse or partner present. About 26.9% of all households were made up of individuals and 12.4% had someone living alone who was 65 years of age or older.

There were 1,237 housing units, of which 41.9% were vacant. The homeowner vacancy rate was 1.8% and the rental vacancy rate was 10.0%.

=== 2000 census ===
As of the census of 2000, there were 929 people, 438 households, and 278 families residing in the town. The population density was 381.8 inhabitants per square mile (147.4/km^{2}). There were 893 housing units at an average density of 367.0 per square mile (141.7/km^{2}). The racial makeup of the town was 98.92% White, 0.32% African American, 0.11% Native American, 0.32% Asian, 0.11% Pacific Islander, and 0.22% from two or more races. Hispanic or Latino of any race were 0.86% of the population.

There were 438 households, out of which 21.0% had children under the age of 18 living with them, 52.3% were married couples living together, 5.9% had a female householder with no husband present, and 36.5% were non-families. 30.6% of all households were made up of individuals, and 15.8% had someone living alone who was 65 years of age or older. The average household size was 2.12 and the average family size was 2.61.

In the town, the population was spread out, with 17.7% under the age of 18, 5.8% from 18 to 24, 23.5% from 25 to 44, 30.8% from 45 to 64, and 22.3% who were 65 years of age or older. The median age was 47 years. For every 100 females, there were 98.9 males. For every 100 females age 18 and over, there were 95.2 males.

The median income for a household in the town was $40,655, and the median income for a family was $46,818. Males had a median income of $30,000 versus $30,104 for females. The per capita income for the town was $25,457. About 11.1% of families and 10.9% of the population were below the poverty line, including 13.0% of those under age 18 and 9.5% of those age 65 or over.
