= Beaufort, North Carolina =

- Town
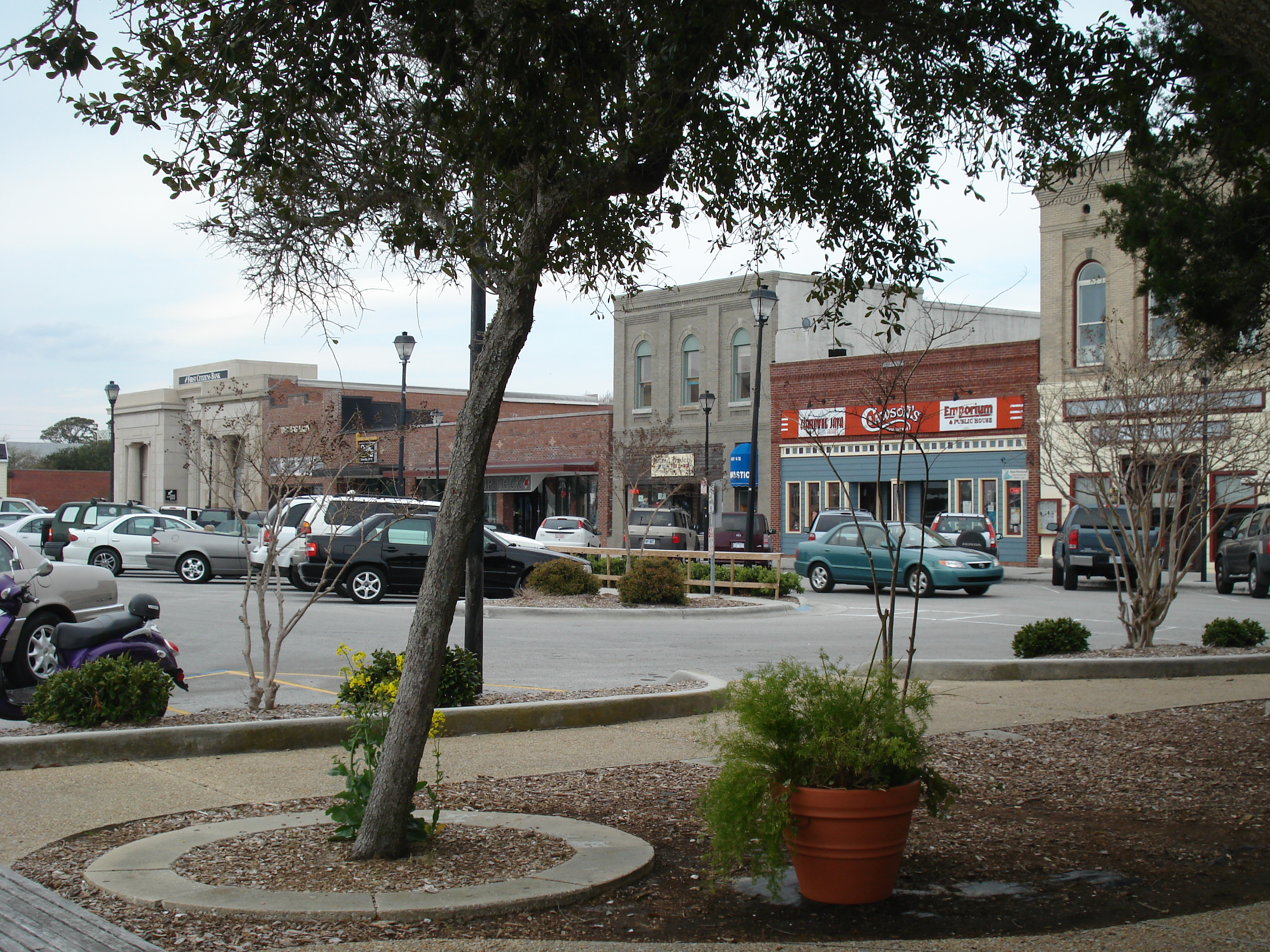
- Downtown Beaufort

- Flag Seal

- Location within North Carolina Location within the United States
- Coordinates: 34°43′21″N 76°39′01″W
- Country: United States
- State: North Carolina
- County: Carteret
- Named for: Henry Somerset, 2nd Duke of Beaufort

Area
  - Total: 7.84 sq mi (20.31 km^{2})
  - Land: 5.08 sq mi (13.17 km^{2})
  - Water: 2.75 sq mi (7.13 km^{2})
- Elevation: 3 ft (0.91 m)

Population (2020)
  - Total: 4,464
  - Density: 877.5/sq mi (338.82/km^{2})
- Time zone: UTC−5 (Eastern (EST))
  - Summer (DST): UTC−4 (EDT)
- ZIP code: 28516
- Area code: 252
- FIPS code: 37-04260
- GNIS feature ID: 2405222
- Website: www.beaufortnc.org

Beaufort (/ˈboʊfərt/ BOH-fərt) is a town in and the county seat of Carteret County, North Carolina, United States. Founded in 1709, Established in 1713 and incorporated in 1723, Beaufort is the third oldest town in North Carolina (after Bath, New Bern). The population was 4,464 at the 2020 census.

Beaufort is located in North Carolina's "Inner Banks" region. The town is home to the North Carolina Maritime Museum, the Duke University Marine Laboratory (Nicholas School of the Environment), and the National Oceanic and Atmospheric Administration (NOAA) Center for Coastal Fisheries and Habitat Research. It is also the location of the Rachel Carson Reserve, part of the N.C. Coastal Reserve and National Estuarine Research Reserve system. It is sometimes confused with a city of the same name in South Carolina; the two are distinguished by different pronunciations.

== History ==
The Beaufort Historic District, Carteret County Home, Duncan House, Gibbs House, Jacob Henry House, and Old Burying Ground are listed on the National Register of Historic Places. In June 1718, Blackbeard ran his flagship, the Queen Anne's Revenge and his sloop Adventure, aground near present-day Beaufort Inlet. The Queen Anne's Revenge was added to the National Register of Historic Places in 2004 with the reference number 04000148. Thirty-two years later, in August 1750, at least three Spanish merchantmen ran aground in North Carolina during a hurricane. One of the three, the El Salvador, sank near Cape Lookout.

Beaufort was established by European settlers in about 1709 on the site of a former Coree Native American village, Cwarioc. The town was surveyed and laid out in 1713 following the end of the Tuscarora War. Subordinates of the lords proprietors of the Province of Carolina designated Beaufort a port for unloading ships on April 4, 1722. In the colonial period, Port Beaufort exported tar, pitch, turpentine, crafts of wood, and corn, especially to the West Indies. The town was incorporated on November 23, 1723. Its boundaries were expanded and new lots sold in 1728, but its population remained small. It was briefly occupied by Spanish privateers in 1747.

Beaufort continued to develop slowly during the antebellum period, but by the mid-19th century it had become a vacation destination and was home to several successful merchants and hotelkeepers.

During the Secession Crisis in April 1861, Beaufort locals formed a militia and seized nearby Fort Macon. The State of North Carolina seceded from the United States in May and joined the Confederate States of America and thus becoming involved in the American Civil War. Federal troops recaptured Beaufort in March 1862 during Burnside's North Carolina Expedition. By 1863, the town had become a destination for escaped slaves. An encampment, known as Union Town, was established on the north side of Beaufort to accommodate them. The Civil War ended in April 1865 but federal occupation troops remained during the Reconstruction era until 1877.

In 1906, railway tracks were extended to Beaufort. A station was built and trains began service the following year.

== Geography ==
Beaufort is located south of the center of Carteret County. It is located near Beaufort Inlet, a channel leading south to the Atlantic Ocean. To the west is the tidal Newport River, separating the town from Morehead City. To the east is the unincorporated neighborhood of Lenoxville, extending to the North River, another tidal river.

U.S. Route 70 passes through Beaufort, leading west across the Newport River to Morehead City and northeast 31 miles (50 km) to its end in the town of Atlantic.

According to the United States Census Bureau, Beaufort has a total area of 5.6 square miles (14.5 km^{2}), of which 4.6 square miles (12.0 km^{2}) is land and 1.0 square mile (2.6 km^{2}), or 17.75%, is water.

== Climate ==
Beaufort has a humid subtropical climate (Cfa), which is characterized by long, hot summers, and short, cool winters.

Climate data for BEAUFORT MICHAEL J SMITH FLD, NC, 1991-2020 normals
Month	Jan	Feb	Mar	Apr	May	Jun	Jul	Aug	Sep	Oct	Nov	Dec	Year
Mean maximum °F (°C)	70.4 (21.3)	70.0 (21.1)	74.9 (23.8)	79.4 (26.3)	85.4 (29.7)	89.8 (32.1)	91.4 (33.0)	89.9 (32.2)	88.1 (31.2)	83.3 (28.5)	77.8 (25.4)	72 (22)	92.8 (33.8)
Mean daily maximum °F (°C)	54.9 (12.7)	57.1 (13.9)	62.9 (17.2)	70.4 (21.3)	77.5 (25.3)	83.6 (28.7)	86.7 (30.4)	85.9 (29.9)	82.4 (28.0)	74.5 (23.6)	65.9 (18.8)	58.9 (14.9)	71.7 (22.1)
Daily mean °F (°C)	46.2 (7.9)	48.2 (9.0)	54.0 (12.2)	62.1 (16.7)	70.1 (21.2)	77.3 (25.2)	80.6 (27.0)	79.5 (26.4)	75.4 (24.1)	66.0 (18.9)	56.5 (13.6)	50.0 (10.0)	63.8 (17.7)
Mean daily minimum °F (°C)	37.5 (3.1)	39.3 (4.1)	45.0 (7.2)	53.9 (12.2)	62.7 (17.1)	71.1 (21.7)	74.4 (23.6)	73.1 (22.8)	68.4 (20.2)	57.4 (14.1)	47.1 (8.4)	41.0 (5.0)	55.9 (13.3)
Mean minimum °F (°C)	20.4 (−6.4)	24.8 (−4.0)	29.4 (−1.4)	39.8 (4.3)	49.7 (9.8)	60.2 (15.7)	66 (19)	65 (18)	57.5 (14.2)	42.2 (5.7)	31.4 (−0.3)	26.5 (−3.1)	18.9 (−7.3)
Average precipitation inches (mm)	4.17 (106)	3.33 (85)	3.31 (84)	3.39 (86)	3.94 (100)	4.06 (103)	5.81 (148)	7.29 (185)	8.46 (215)	4.14 (105)	3.99 (101)	3.79 (96)	55.68 (1,414)
Average precipitation days (≥ 0.01 in)	9.6	10.8	9.8	9.4	11.0	11.4	12.7	13.2	13.0	9.7	10.0	10.6	131.2
Source: NOAA

== Demographics ==
Historical population
Census	Pop.	Note	%±
1800	437		—
1850	1,661		—
1860	1,610		−3.1%
1870	2,430		50.9%
1880	2,009		−17.3%
1890	2,007		−0.1%
1900	2,195		9.4%
1910	2,483		13.1%
1920	2,968		19.5%
1930	2,957		−0.4%
1940	3,272		10.7%
1950	3,212		−1.8%
1960	2,922		−9.0%
1970	3,368		15.3%
1980	3,826		13.6%
1990	3,808		−0.5%
2000	3,771		−1.0%
2010	4,391		16.4%
2020	4,464		1.7%
U.S. Decennial Census

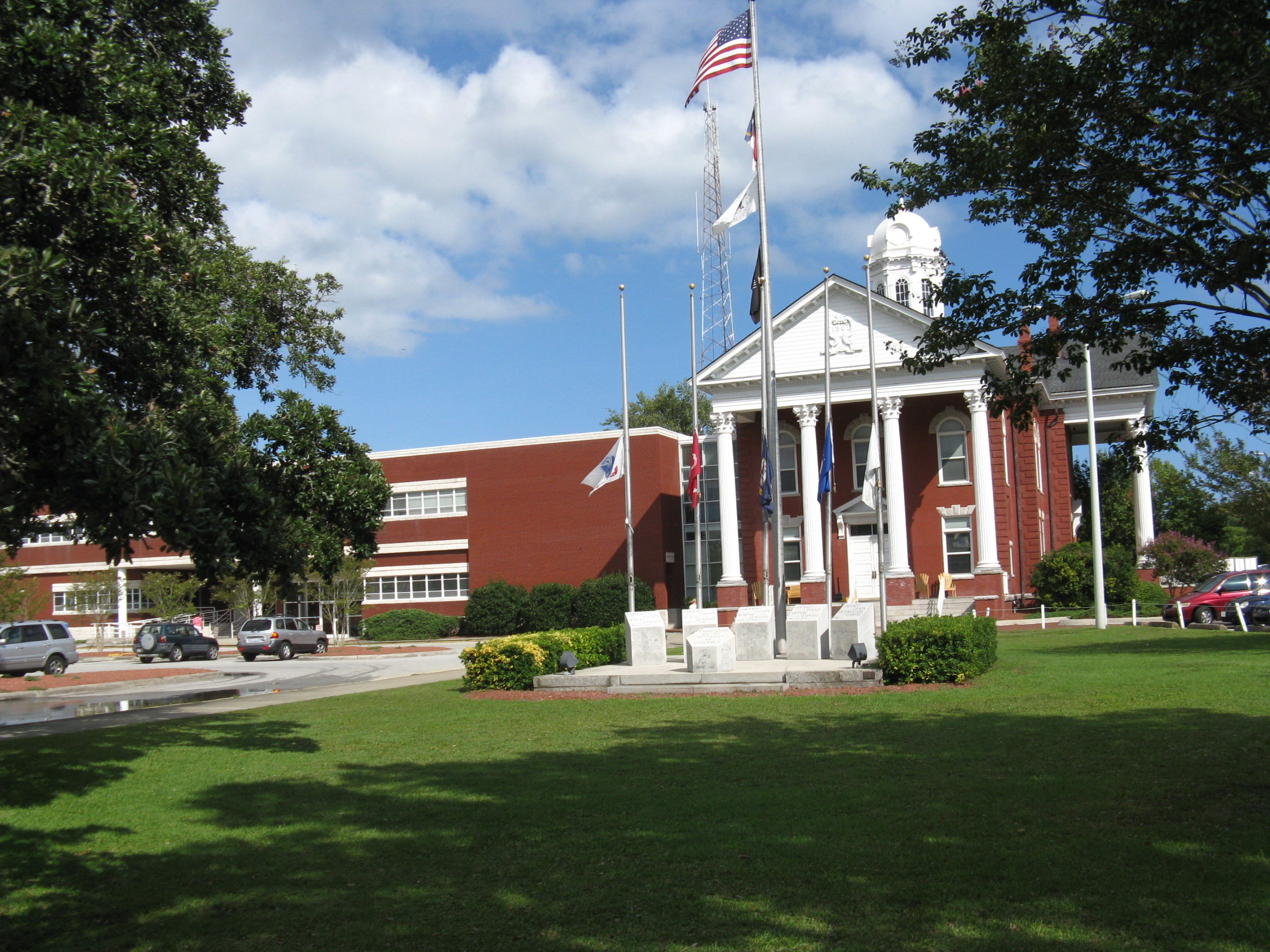
Carteret County Courthouse in Beaufort

=== 2020 census ===
Beaufort racial composition
Race	Number	Percentage
White (non-Hispanic)	3,608	80.82%
Black or African American (non-Hispanic)	499	11.18%
Native American	7	0.16%
Asian	44	0.99%
Pacific Islander	4	0.09%
Other/Mixed	181	4.05%
Hispanic or Latino	121	2.71%

As of the 2020 census, Beaufort had a population of 4,464. The median age was 51.6 years. 13.8% of residents were under the age of 18 and 28.8% were 65 years of age or older. For every 100 females there were 83.2 males, and for every 100 females age 18 and over there were 81.1 males age 18 and over.

98.1% of residents lived in urban areas, while 1.9% lived in rural areas.

There were 2,273 households in Beaufort, including 1,071 family households. Of all households, 17.5% had children under the age of 18 living in them, 35.5% were married-couple households, 19.4% were households with a male householder and no spouse or partner present, and 39.1% were households with a female householder and no spouse or partner present. About 42.6% of all households were made up of individuals and 20.5% had someone living alone who was 65 years of age or older.

There were 3,094 housing units, of which 26.5% were vacant. The homeowner vacancy rate was 3.1% and the rental vacancy rate was 6.7%.

=== 2008 ===
As of the census of 2008, there were 4,189 people, 1,780 households, and 1,048 families residing in the town. The population density was 1,374.4 inhabitants per square mile (530.7/km^{2}). There were 2,187 housing units at an average density of 797.1 per square mile (307.8/km^{2}). The racial makeup of the town was 75.87% White, 19.99% African American, 0.37% Asian, 0.11% Native American, 0.05% Pacific Islander, 2.39% from other races, and 1.22% from two or more races. Hispanic or Latino of any race were 3.77% of the population.

There were 1,780 households, out of which 21.9% had children under the age of 18 living with them, 40.3% were married couples living together, 15.3% had a female householder with no husband present, and 41.1% were non-families. 35.5% of all households were made up of individuals, and 15.6% had someone living alone who was 65 years of age or older. The average household size was 2.07 and the average family size was 2.65.

In the town, the population was spread out, with 18.3% under the age of 18, 7.3% from 18 to 24, 27.9% from 25 to 44, 26.7% from 45 to 64, and 19.8% who were 65 years of age or older. The median age was 43 years. For every 100 females, there were 87.1 males. For every 100 females age 18 and over, there were 83.5 males.

The median income for a household in the town was $28,763, and the median income for a family was $39,429. Males had a median income of $30,859 versus $22,955 for females. The per capita income for the town was $19,356. About 13.3% of families and 16.6% of the population were below the poverty line, including 35.0% of those under age 18 and 10.4% of those age 65 or over.

== Government ==
Beaufort uses a council-manager form of government. The community elects a mayor and five council members. Mayors serve two-year terms, and council members serve staggered four-year terms.

== Education ==
=== K-12 education ===
Carteret County Public Schools is the county school district.

Zoned schools include:

- Beaufort Elementary School – There is also a former Beaufort Elementary Campus.
- Beaufort Middle School
- Beaufort students attend East Carteret High School, – located north of town

Charter schools include:

- Tiller School

=== Higher education ===
- Nicholas School of the Environment Marine Lab

== Transportation ==
=== Highways ===
- US 70
- NC 101

=== Airport ===
- Michael J. Smith Field

== Culture ==
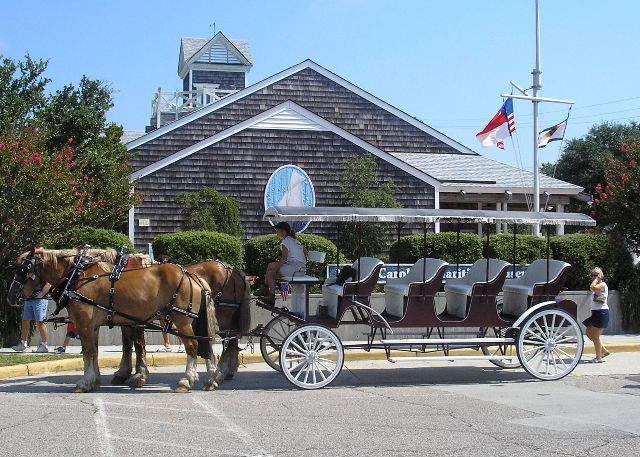
A horse-drawn carriage in front of the North Carolina Maritime Museum

Beaufort hosts several annual events, including:

- Beaufort Music Festival
- North Carolina Maritime Museum Wooden Boat Show
- BARTA Fishing Tournament
- Beaufort Pirate Invasion
- Beaufort Wine and Food Festival

Beaufort is also home to the Carteret County main public library.

== Honors and designations ==
- On February 1, 2012, Beaufort was ranked as "America's Coolest Small Town" by readers of Budget Travel Magazine.
- Beaufort NC was named a 2015 Tree City USA by the Arbor Day Foundation in honor of its commitment to effective urban forest management.

== Sister cities ==
According to Beaufort Sister Cities, Inc., the city of Beaufort has 19 sister cities:

- Beaufort, Victoria, Australia
- Beaufort, Haute-Garonne, France
- Beaufort, Hérault, France
- Beaufort, Isère, France
- Beaufort, Jura, France
- Beaufort, Nord, France
- Beaufort-Blavincourt, France
- Beaufort-en-Argonne, France
- Beaufort-en-Santerre, France
- Beaufort-en-Vallée, France
- Beaufort-sur-Doron, France
- Beaufort-sur-Gervanne, France
- Chapdes-Beaufort, France
- Montmorency-Beaufort, France
- Beaufort, County Kerry, Ireland
- Beaufort, Luxembourg
- Beaufort, Sabah, Malaysia
- Beaufort West, Western Cape, South Africa
- Beaufort, Wales, United Kingdom

== See also ==
- Beaufort Historic Site
- National Register of Historic Places listings in Carteret County, North Carolina

== Works cited ==
- Browning, Judkin (August 2005). "Removing the Mask of Nationality: Unionism, Racism, and Federal Military Occupation in North Carolina, 1862-1865". The Journal of Southern History. 71 (2): 589–620. JSTOR 27648821.
- Wilson, Mamré Marsh (2002). Beaufort, North Carolina. The Making of America. Charleston, North Carolina: Arcadia Publishing. ISBN 978-07385-2363-7.
