= Old Burying Ground (Beaufort, North Carolina) =

Historic cemetery in North Carolina, United States

- U.S. National Register of Historic Places
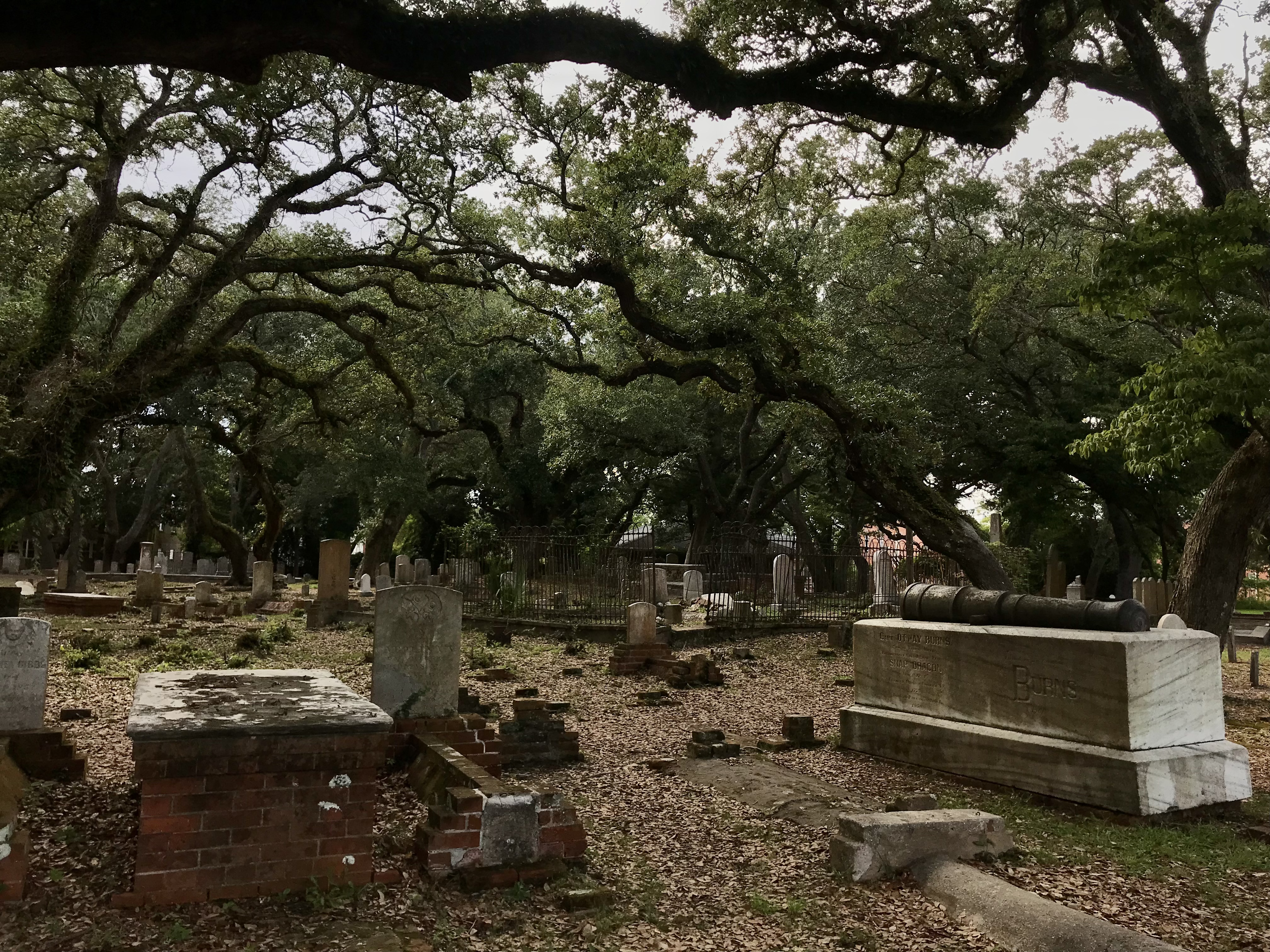
- Old Burying Ground, July 2024

- Location within North Carolina Location within the United States
- Location: Bounded by Ann, Craven, and Broad Sts., Beaufort, North Carolina
- Coordinates: 34°43′7″N 76°39′51″W
- Area: 2 acres (0.81 ha)
- Built: 1724
- NRHP reference No.: 74001332
- Added to NRHP: April 8, 1974

Old Burying Ground is a historic cemetery located at Beaufort, Carteret County, North Carolina. It was established in 1724. There are approximately 200 stones from the pre-American Civil War era, approximately 45 from the war period, about 150 from 1865 to 1900, and a few 20th-century markers. Notable burials include Otway Burns, a naval hero in the War of 1812, and Colonel William Thompson, commander of the Carteret County Regiment during the American Revolution.

It was listed on the National Register of Historic Places in 1974.
