= Broad =

Broad(s) or The Broad(s) may refer to:

== People ==
- A slang term for a woman
- Broad (surname), a surname

== Places ==
- The Broad, a modern art museum in Los Angeles, California
- Broad Avenue, a street and arts district in Memphis, Tennessee
- Broad Bay (disambiguation)
- Broad Campden, Gloucestershire, England
- Broad Canal, East Cambridge, Massachusetts, United States
- Broad Channel, a neighborhood in Queens, United States
- Broad Crag, a fell in the English Lake District, United Kingdom
- Broad Creek (disambiguation)
- Broad Dyke, built by the Dutch in 1655 in New Castle, Delaware
- Broad Peak, on the border between Pakistan and China, the 12th highest mountain on Earth
- Broad River (disambiguation)
- Broad Run (disambiguation)
- Broad Street (disambiguation)
- Broad Sound (disambiguation)
- Broad Valley, Graham Land, Antarctica
- Broad Wall (Jerusalem), an ancient defensive wall
- Broad Water, a salt water lagoon near Tywyn, Wales, United Kingdom
- The Broads, a network of mostly navigable rivers and lakes in the English counties of Norfolk and Suffolk, United Kingdom
  - The Broads include several areas of navigable water known as Broads; the largest is Hickling Broad (see Category:Norfolk Broads)
- The Broads (New Hampshire), a wide portion of Lake Winnipesaukee in Belknap County, New Hampshire, United States
- Eli and Edythe Broad Art Museum, contemporary art museum on the campus of Michigan State University in East Lansing, Michigan
- Tixall Wide, also known as The Broad Water, a body of water in Staffordshire, England, United Kingdom

== Other uses ==
- An 18th-century slang term for a playing card
- Broad (British coin), an English gold coin minted under the Commonwealth
- The Broad (folk custom), a hooded-animal tradition in the Cotswolds, England
- Broad Group, a manufacturing company based in Changsha
- Broad Institute, a genomic research institute

== See also ==
- Broad church, Latitudinarian churchmanship in the Church of England
- Broad gauge, rail gauge greater than the standard gauge of 4′ 8 1/2″
- Broad Front (disambiguation)
