= Broad Street =

Broad Street or Broadstreet may refer to:

== Places and streets ==
- Broad Street Historic District (disambiguation)

=== Nigeria ===
- Broad Street, Lagos

=== United Kingdom ===
- Broad Street, Reading, Berkshire
- Broad Street, Bristol
- Broad Street, East Sussex, a location
- Broad Street, Kent, in Hollingbourne, Maidstone
- Broad Street, Lyminge, a location in Folkestone and Hythe, Kent
- Broad Street, Monks Horton, a location in Folkestone and Hythe, Kent
- Broad Street, Medway, a location in Kent
- Broad Street, Spalding, in Spalding, Lincolnshire
- Broad Street (ward), in London
- Broad Street railway station (England), in London
- Broad Street, Oxford, Oxfordshire
- Broad Street, Suffolk, hamlet near Groton
- Broad Street, Birmingham, West Midlands
- Broad Street, Wiltshire
- Broad Street, Aberdeen, Scotland
- Broad Street, Peterhead, Scotland
- Broadwick Street, Soho, London, formerly Broad Street
- High Holborn, London, formerly Broad Street
- Broadstreet Green. Bromley, London, England, UK; a green

=== United States ===
- Broad Street (Athens, Georgia) on the boundary of Downtown Athens (Georgia)
- Broad Street (Augusta, Georgia), mostly signed as U.S. Route 25 Business
- Broad Street, Monroe, Georgia, also signed as State Route 11
- Broad Street, Boston, Massachusetts, site of the Broad Street Riot of 1837
- Broad Street, Monowi, Nebraska
- Broad Street (Red Bank, New Jersey)
- Broad Street (Manhattan), New York City
- Broadstreet Hollow, West Kill Mountain, Greene County, New York State, USA; a stream
- Broad Street (Columbus, Ohio), major street that goes through the center of the city
- Broad Street (Johnstown), Pennsylvania
- Broad Street (Philadelphia), Pennsylvania, main north–south route through Philadelphia
- Broad Street (Charleston, South Carolina)
- Broad Street (Richmond, Virginia), 15-mile-long (24 km) road through Richmond
- East Broad Street, Savannah, Georgia
- Martin Luther King Jr. Boulevard (Savannah), formerly known as West Broad Street

== People ==
- Jeff Broadstreet (born 1960), U.S. filmmaker
- Frank Broadstreet Carvell (1862–1924), Canadian politician, lawyer, businessman

== Groups, companies, organizations ==
- Broadstreet RFC, Coventry, West Midlands, England, UK; a rugby club
- Broadstreet's, a New York City clothing retailer

== Other uses ==
- "Broad Street", a 1991 song by Mulgrew Miller from Time and Again

== See also ==
- Broadstreet bully (disambiguation)
- Broad Avenue, Memphis, Tennessee, USA
- The Broad Highway
- Broad Freeway
- Broad Road (disambiguation)
- Broadway (disambiguation)
- Broad Channel (disambiguation)
- Broad (disambiguation)
- Street (disambiguation)
