= Broadfield =

Broadfield or Broadfields may refer to:

== England ==
- Broadfield, Greater Manchester, a United Kingdom location
  - Broadfield railway station, 1869–1970
- Broadfield, Hertfordshire
- Broadfield, Leyland, Lancashire, a United Kingdom location
- Broadfield, Oswaldtwistle, Lancashire, a United Kingdom location
- Broadfield, West Sussex, a neighborhood within the town of Crawley
  - Broadfield (electoral division), a West Sussex County Council constituency
  - Broadfield Stadium
- Broadfields Estate, London

== Other places ==
- Broadfield, Inverclyde, Scotland, a United Kingdom location
- Broadfield, Pembrokeshire, Wales
- Broadfield, New Zealand, New Zealand
