= List of United Kingdom locations: Bro-Bron =

The United Kingdom

This is part of the list of United Kingdom locations: a gazetteer of place names in the United Kingdom showing each place's locality and geographical coordinates.

== Br (continued) ==
=== Bro ===
==== Broa ====
Location	Locality	Coordinates (links to map & photo sources)	OS grid reference
Broad Alley	Worcestershire	52.30°N 02.17°W	SO8867
Broad Blunsdon	Swindon	51.60°N 01.78°W	SU1590
Broadbottom	Tameside	53.44°N 02.03°W	SJ9894
Broadbridge	West Sussex	50.83°N 00.85°W	SU8105
Broadbridge Heath	West Sussex	51.06°N 00.37°W	TQ1431
Broadbury	Devon	50.74°N 04.17°W	SX4796
Broadbush	Swindon	51.60°N 01.78°W	SU1590
Broad Campden	Gloucestershire	52.03°N 01.78°W	SP1537
Broad Carr	Calderdale	53.66°N 01.86°W	SE0919
Broad Chalke	Wiltshire	51.02°N 01.95°W	SU0325
Broad Clough	Lancashire	53.71°N 02.20°W	SD8623
Broadclyst	Devon	50.76°N 03.44°W	SX9897
Broad Colney	Hertfordshire	51.71°N 00.30°W	TL1703
Broad Common	Worcestershire	52.30°N 02.19°W	SO8767
Broadfield	West Sussex	51.09°N 00.21°W	TQ2534
Broadfield	Pembrokeshire	51.69°N 04.70°W	SN1303
Broadfield (Oswaldtwistle)	Lancashire	53.73°N 02.39°W	SD7427
Broadfield (Leyland)	Lancashire	53.69°N 02.71°W	SD5322
Broadfield	Rochdale	53.58°N 02.24°W	SD8410
Broadfield	Inverclyde	55.92°N 04.65°W	NS3473
Broad Ford	Kent	51.12°N 00.44°E	TQ7139
Broadford	Surrey	51.20°N 00.58°W	SU9946
Broadford	Highland	57.23°N 05.91°W	NG6423
Broadford Bridge	West Sussex	50.97°N 00.44°W	TQ0921
Broadgate	East Riding of Yorkshire	53.82°N 00.46°W	TA0137
Broadgate	Hampshire	50.99°N 01.41°W	SU4122
Broadgrass Green	Suffolk	52.23°N 00.86°E	TL9663
Broad Green	Bedfordshire	52.07°N 00.61°W	SP9543
Broad Green	Cambridgeshire	52.20°N 00.45°E	TL6859
Broad Green (Chrishall)	Essex	52.03°N 00.09°E	TL4439
Broad Green (Coggleshall)	Essex	51.87°N 00.71°E	TL8723
Broad Green (Broadwas)	Worcestershire	52.19°N 02.35°W	SO7655
Broad Green (Tutnall)	Worcestershire	52.32°N 02.01°W	SO9970
Broad Green	Croydon	51.37°N 00.10°W	TQ3266
Broad Green	Liverpool	53.40°N 02.90°W	SJ4090
Broad Green (Chevington)	Suffolk	52.20°N 00.60°E	TL7859
Broad Green (Earl Stonham)	Suffolk	52.18°N 01.05°E	TM0959
Broadgreen Wood	Hertfordshire	51.76°N 00.10°W	TL3109
Broadhalgh	Rochdale	53.61°N 02.19°W	SD8713
Broadham Green	Surrey	51.24°N 00.02°W	TQ3851
Broadhaugh	Scottish Borders	55.37°N 02.86°W	NT4509
Broad Haven	Pembrokeshire	51.77°N 05.10°W	SM8613
Broadhaven	Highland	58.44°N 03.08°W	ND3751
Broad Heath	Herefordshire	52.26°N 02.98°W	SO3363
Broadheath	Trafford	53.39°N 02.36°W	SJ7689
Broad Heath	Staffordshire	52.82°N 02.22°W	SJ8525
Broadhembury	Devon	50.82°N 03.27°W	ST1004
Broadhempston	Devon	50.48°N 03.69°W	SX8066
Broad Hill	Cambridgeshire	52.35°N 00.33°E	TL5976
Broad Hinton	Wiltshire	51.48°N 01.85°W	SU1076
Broadholm	Derbyshire	53.03°N 01.49°W	SK3449
Broadholme	Lincolnshire	53.25°N 00.66°W	SK8974
Broad Ings	East Riding of Yorkshire	53.94°N 00.78°W	SE8051
Broadland Row	East Sussex	50.94°N 00.60°E	TQ8319
Broadlands	Devon	50.52°N 03.62°W	SX8571
Broad Lane	Cornwall	50.23°N 05.26°W	SW6742
Broadlane	Cornwall	50.12°N 05.34°W	SW6130
Broad Lanes	Shropshire	52.48°N 02.34°W	SO7788
Broadlay	Carmarthenshire	51.75°N 04.36°W	SN3709
Broad Layings	Hampshire	51.35°N 01.38°W	SU4362
Broadley	Moray	57.63°N 03.02°W	NJ3961
Broadley	Rossendale	53.64°N 02.18°W	SD8816
Broadley Common	Essex	51.73°N 00.05°E	TL4206
Broad Marston	Worcestershire	52.11°N 01.79°W	SP1446
Broadmayne	Dorset	50.67°N 02.39°W	SY7286
Broad Meadow	Staffordshire	53.02°N 02.25°W	SJ8348
Broadmeadows	Scottish Borders	55.56°N 02.93°W	NT4130
Broadmere	Hampshire	51.21°N 01.12°W	SU6147
Broadmoor	Surrey	51.19°N 00.38°W	TQ1345
Broadmoor	Pembrokeshire	51.71°N 04.76°W	SN0905
Broadmoor Common	Herefordshire	52.02°N 02.58°W	SO6036
Broadmore Green	Worcestershire	52.17°N 02.27°W	SO8153
Broad Oak (Brede)	East Sussex	50.95°N 00.58°E	TQ8220
Broad Oak (Heathfield)	East Sussex	50.97°N 00.27°E	TQ6022
Broadoak	Hampshire	50.91°N 01.29°W	SU5013
Broad Oak	Devon	50.72°N 03.33°W	SY0693
Broad Oak	Dorset	50.90°N 02.31°W	ST7812
Broadoak	Dorset	50.76°N 02.80°W	SY4396
Broad Oak	Shropshire	52.48°N 02.32°W	SO7888
Broad Oak	Herefordshire	51.88°N 02.75°W	SO4821
Broadoak	Gloucestershire	51.80°N 02.43°W	SO7012
Broad Oak	Carmarthenshire	51.87°N 04.07°W	SN5722
Broad Oak	Hampshire	51.25°N 00.92°W	SU7551
Broad Oak (Sturry)	Kent	51.30°N 01.09°E	TR1661
Broad Oak (Mersham)	Kent	51.10°N 00.91°E	TR0438
Broad Oak	Cumbria	54.33°N 03.37°W	SD1194
Broad Oak	St Helens	53.45°N 02.70°W	SJ5395
Broadoak	Wrexham	53.11°N 02.95°W	SJ3658
Broadoak	Shropshire	52.74°N 02.75°W	SJ4917
Broadoak End	Hertfordshire	51.80°N 00.11°W	TL3013
Broadoak Park	Salford	53.49°N 02.36°W	SD7600
Broad Parkham	Devon	50.97°N 04.32°W	SS3722
Broadplat	Oxfordshire	51.54°N 00.94°W	SU7383
Broadrock	Gloucestershire	51.66°N 02.66°W	ST5496
Broadsands	Devon	50.40°N 03.56°W	SX8957
Broadsea	Aberdeenshire	57.69°N 02.03°W	NJ9867
Broad's Green	Essex	51.78°N 00.44°E	TL6912
Broad's Green	Wiltshire	51.40°N 02.03°W	ST9867
Broadshard	Somerset	50.88°N 02.79°W	ST4410
Broadstairs	Kent	51.35°N 01.43°E	TR3967
Broadstone	Kent	51.19°N 00.66°E	TQ8647
Broadstone	Monmouthshire	51.72°N 02.72°W	SO5003
Broadstone	Poole	50.75°N 02.00°W	SZ0095
Broadstone	Shropshire	52.49°N 02.67°W	SO5489
Broad Street (Folkestone)	Kent	51.11°N 01.08°E	TR1640
Broad Street (Ashford)	Kent	51.12°N 01.01°E	TR1140
Broad Street (Rochester)	Kent	51.41°N 00.52°E	TQ7671
Broad Street (Maidstone)	Kent	51.27°N 00.62°E	TQ8356
Broad Street	East Sussex	50.91°N 00.64°E	TQ8616
Broad Street	Suffolk	52.05°N 00.85°E	TL9643
Broad Street	Wiltshire	51.33°N 01.85°W	SU1059
Broadstreet Common	City of Newport	51.55°N 02.93°W	ST3584
Broad Street Green	Essex	51.74°N 00.69°E	TL8609
Broad Tenterden	Kent	51.05°N 00.68°E	TQ8832
Broad Town	Wiltshire	51.49°N 01.87°W	SU0977
Broadward	Herefordshire	52.21°N 2.737°W	SO496571
Broadward	Shropshire	52.384°N 2.899°W	SO388766
Broadwas	Worcestershire	52.19°N 02.35°W	SO7655
Broadwater	West Sussex	50.82°N 00.38°W	TQ1404
Broadwater	Hertfordshire	51.88°N 00.18°W	TL2522
Broadwater Down	East Sussex	51.11°N 00.24°E	TQ5737
Broadwaters	Worcestershire	52.40°N 02.23°W	SO8478
Broadwath	Cumbria	54.88°N 02.81°W	NY4855
Broadway	Somerset	50.93°N 02.96°W	ST3215
Broadway	Suffolk	52.34°N 01.50°E	TM3978
Broadway	Worcestershire	52.03°N 01.87°W	SP0937
Broadway (Laugharne)	Carmarthenshire	51.76°N 04.47°W	SN2910
Broadway (St Ishmael)	Carmarthenshire	51.74°N 04.34°W	SN3808
Broadway	Pembrokeshire	51.77°N 05.08°W	SM8713
Broadway Lands	Herefordshire	51.96°N 02.65°W	SO5530
Broadwell	Warwickshire	52.28°N 01.34°W	SP4565
Broadwell (Forest of Dean)	Gloucestershire	51.79°N 02.61°W	SO5811
Broadwell (Cotswold)	Gloucestershire	51.94°N 01.71°W	SP2027
Broadwell	Oxfordshire	51.72°N 01.63°W	SP2503
Broadwey	Dorset	50.64°N 02.48°W	SY6683
Broadwindsor	Dorset	50.81°N 02.81°W	ST4302
Broadwoodkelly	Devon	50.82°N 03.97°W	SS6105
Broadwoodwidger	Devon	50.67°N 04.25°W	SX4189

==== Brob-Bron ====
Location	Locality	Coordinates (links to map & photo sources)	OS grid reference
Brobury	Herefordshire	52.09°N 02.96°W	SO3444
Brocair	Western Isles	58.24°N 06.17°W	NB5536
Brochel	Highland	57.44°N 06.03°W	NG5846
Brochroy	Argyll and Bute	56.42°N 05.24°W	NN0031
Brock	Lancashire	53.85°N 02.74°W	SD5140
Brockamin	Worcestershire	52.17°N 02.35°W	SO7653
Brockbridge	Hampshire	50.95°N 01.13°W	SU6118
Brockdish	Norfolk	52.36°N 01.23°E	TM2079
Brockencote	Worcestershire	52.35°N 02.17°W	SO8873
Brockenhurst	Hampshire	50.81°N 01.58°W	SU2902
Brocketsbrae	South Lanarkshire	55.63°N 03.87°W	NS8239
Brockfield	Devon	50.84°N 02.99°W	ST3005
Brockford Green	Suffolk	52.24°N 01.10°E	TM1265
Brockford Street	Suffolk	52.25°N 01.09°E	TM1166
Brockhall	Northamptonshire	52.25°N 01.07°W	SP6362
Brockham	Surrey	51.22°N 00.29°W	TQ1949
Brockham End	Bath and North East Somerset	51.41°N 02.41°W	ST7169
Brockham Park	Surrey	51.20°N 00.28°W	TQ2047
Brockhampton	Hampshire	50.84°N 00.99°W	SU7106
Brockhampton	Herefordshire	51.97°N 02.59°W	SO5931
Brockhampton (Bishop's Cleeve)	Gloucestershire	51.93°N 02.08°W	SO9426
Brockhampton (Sevenhampton)	Gloucestershire	51.89°N 01.95°W	SP0322
Brockhampton Green	Dorset	50.85°N 02.41°W	ST7106
Brock Hill	Essex	51.63°N 00.49°E	TQ7396
Brockhill	Scottish Borders	55.50°N 02.96°W	NT3924
Brockhole	Cumbria	54.40°N 02.94°W	NY3801
Brockholes	Kirklees	53.59°N 01.78°W	SE1411
Brockhollands	Gloucestershire	51.74°N 02.56°W	SO6105
Brockhurst	Derbyshire	53.17°N 01.50°W	SK3364
Brockhurst	Staffordshire	52.70°N 02.26°W	SJ8212
Brockhurst	Hampshire	50.80°N 01.16°W	SU5901
Brockhurst	Warwickshire	52.44°N 01.32°W	SP4683
Brocklehirst	Dumfries and Galloway	55.05°N 03.48°W	NY0574
Brocklesby	Lincolnshire	53.58°N 00.27°W	TA1411
Brockley	Suffolk	52.30°N 00.68°E	TL8371
Brockley	North Somerset	51.39°N 02.77°W	ST4666
Brockley	Lewisham	51.44°N 00.04°W	TQ3674
Brockley Green (Hundon)	Suffolk	52.09°N 00.50°E	TL7247
Brockley Green (Brockley)	Suffolk	52.15°N 00.65°E	TL8254
Brockleymoor	Cumbria	54.71°N 02.79°W	NY4936
Brockmanton	Herefordshire	52.22°N 02.67°W	SO5459
Brockmoor	Dudley	52.48°N 02.13°W	SO9187
Brockscombe	Devon	50.72°N 04.18°W	SX4694
Brock's Green	Hampshire	51.34°N 01.28°W	SU5061
Brock's Watering	Norfolk	52.48°N 01.15°E	TM1492
Brockton (Lydbury North)	Shropshire	52.45°N 03.00°W	SO3285
Brockton (Stanton Long)	Shropshire	52.53°N 02.63°W	SO5793
Brockton (Worthen)	Shropshire	52.62°N 03.02°W	SJ3104
Brockton (Church Aston)	Shropshire	52.74°N 02.41°W	SJ7216
Brockton (Sutton Maddock)	Shropshire	52.62°N 02.41°W	SJ7203
Brockton	Staffordshire	52.87°N 02.28°W	SJ8131
Brockweir	Gloucestershire	51.70°N 02.66°W	SO5401
Brockwell	Somerset	51.17°N 03.54°W	SS9243
Brockworth	Gloucestershire	51.84°N 02.16°W	SO8916
Brocton	Cornwall	50.47°N 04.80°W	SX0168
Brocton	Staffordshire	52.76°N 02.06°W	SJ9619
Brodick	North Ayrshire	55.57°N 05.15°W	NS0136
Brodiesord	Aberdeenshire	57.62°N 02.72°W	NJ5760
Brodsworth	Doncaster	53.55°N 01.24°W	SE5007
Brogaig	Highland	57.63°N 06.24°W	NG4768
Brogborough	Bedfordshire	52.03°N 00.60°W	SP9638
Broke Hall	Suffolk	52.04°N 01.19°E	TM1943
Brokenborough	Wiltshire	51.59°N 02.13°W	ST9189
Broken Cross (Macclesfield)	Cheshire	53.25°N 02.16°W	SJ8973
Broken Cross (Rudheath)	Cheshire	53.25°N 02.48°W	SJ6873
Broken Green	Hertfordshire	51.87°N 00.04°E	TL4122
Brokerswood	Wiltshire	51.25°N 02.24°W	ST8351
Brokes	North Yorkshire	54.38°N 01.77°W	SE1599
Brombil	Neath Port Talbot	51.56°N 03.74°W	SS7987
Bromborough	Wirral	53.33°N 02.99°W	SJ3482
Bromborough Pool	Wirral	53.34°N 02.99°W	SJ3484
Bromdon	Shropshire	52.41°N 02.58°W	SO6080
Brome	Suffolk	52.34°N 01.12°E	TM1376
Brome Street	Suffolk	52.34°N 01.15°E	TM1576
Bromeswell	Suffolk	52.10°N 01.35°E	TM3050
Bromfield	Shropshire	52.37°N 02.76°W	SO4876
Bromfield	Cumbria	54.80°N 03.29°W	NY1746
Bromford	Birmingham	52.50°N 01.82°W	SP1290
Bromham	Bedfordshire	52.14°N 00.53°W	TL0051
Bromham	Wiltshire	51.38°N 02.05°W	ST9665
Bromley	Dudley	52.49°N 02.14°W	SO9088
Bromley	Hertfordshire	51.87°N 00.04°E	TL4121
Bromley	Tower Hamlets	51.52°N 00.02°W	TQ3782
Bromley	Bromley	51.40°N 00.01°E	TQ4069
Bromley	Barnsley	53.47°N 01.51°W	SK3298
Bromley (Hordley)	Shropshire	52.82°N 02.89°W	SJ4026
Bromley (Worfield)	Shropshire	52.55°N 02.39°W	SO7395
Bromley Common	Bromley	51.38°N 00.02°E	TQ4167
Bromley Cross	Essex	51.90°N 00.99°E	TM0627
Bromley Cross	Bolton	53.61°N 02.40°W	SD7313
Bromley Green	Kent	51.08°N 00.84°E	TQ9936
Bromley Hall	Staffordshire	52.90°N 02.34°W	SJ7734
Bromley Heath	South Gloucestershire	51.50°N 02.50°W	ST6578
Bromley Park	Bromley	51.40°N -00.00°E	TQ3969
Bromley Wood	Staffordshire	52.81°N 01.85°W	SK1024
Bromlow	Shropshire	52.60°N 03.00°W	SJ3201
Brompton	North Yorkshire	54.35°N 01.43°W	SE3796
Brompton	Kent	51.38°N 00.52°E	TQ7668
Brompton	Royal Borough of Kensington and Chelsea	51.49°N 00.17°W	TQ2779
Brompton	Shropshire	52.65°N 02.68°W	SJ5407
Brompton-by-Sawdon	North Yorkshire	54.22°N 00.55°W	SE9482
Brompton-on-Swale	North Yorkshire	54.38°N 01.67°W	SE2199
Brompton Ralph	Somerset	51.08°N 03.31°W	ST0832
Brompton Regis	Somerset	51.06°N 03.50°W	SS9531
Bromsash	Herefordshire	51.91°N 02.52°W	SO6424
Bromsberrow	Gloucestershire	52.00°N 02.38°W	SO7434
Bromsberrow Heath	Gloucestershire	51.98°N 02.39°W	SO7332
Bromsgrove	Worcestershire	52.32°N 02.07°W	SO9570
Bromstead Common	Staffordshire	52.75°N 02.29°W	SJ8018
Bromstead Heath	Staffordshire	52.75°N 02.29°W	SJ8017
Bromstone	Kent	51.35°N 01.41°E	TR3867
Bromyard	Herefordshire	52.18°N 02.51°W	SO6554
Bromyard Downs	Herefordshire	52.19°N 02.49°W	SO6655
Bronaber	Gwynedd	52.86°N 03.91°W	SH7131
Bronant or Bronnant	Ceredigion	52.28°N 03.99°W	SN6467
Broncroft	Shropshire	52.47°N 02.67°W	SO5486
Brondesbury	Brent	51.54°N 00.21°W	TQ2484
Brondesbury Park	Brent	51.53°N 00.22°W	TQ2383
Broneirion	Powys	52.48°N 03.44°W	SO0288
Brongest	Ceredigion	52.07°N 04.45°W	SN3245
Brongwyn	Ceredigion	52.05°N 04.51°W	SN2843
Bronington	Wrexham	52.94°N 02.77°W	SJ4839
Bronllys	Powys	52.00°N 03.25°W	SO1435
Bronwydd (Bronwydd Castle)	Ceredigion	52.06°N 04.40°W	SN3543
Bronwydd (Bronwydd Arms)	Carmarthenshire	51.89°N 04.31°W	SN4124
Bronydd	Powys	52.09°N 03.14°W	SO2245
Bronygarth	Shropshire	52.92°N 03.10°W	SJ2637
