= Broad Channel (disambiguation) =

Broad Channel is a neighborhood in the New York City borough of Queens.

Broad Channel may also refer to:

- Broad Channel station, a subway station
- "Broad Channel" (Law & Order: Criminal Intent episode)

== See also ==
- Broad River (disambiguation)
- Channel (disambiguation)
- Broad (disambiguation)
