= Broad Creek =

Broad Creek may refer to the following locations:

== Rivers ==
- Broad Creek (Nanticoke River tributary), a stream in Sussex County, Delaware
- Broad Creek (Bogue Sound), North Carolina, US
- Broad Creek (South Australia), flows into Barker Inlet, South Australia
- Broad Creek (Susquehanna River), Maryland, US

== Other places ==
- Broad Creek Hundred, Delaware, US
- Broad Creek, Maryland, a former town on Kent Island, Md, US
- Broad Creek Memorial Scout Reservation, US
- Broad Creek, North Carolina, US
- Broad Creek, Prince George's County, Maryland, US
- Broad Creek Soapstone Quarries, Maryland, US

== See also ==
- Broad River (disambiguation)
