= List of shipwrecks in 1764 =

The following ships were sunk, wrecked or otherwise lost during 1764.

table of contents
1764
Jan	Feb	Mar	Apr
May	Jun	Jul	Aug
Sep	Oct	Nov	Dec
Unknown date

== January ==
=== 4 January ===
List of shipwrecks: 4 January 1764
Ship	State	Description
Britannia	Great Britain	The ship was driven ashore and wrecked near Dungeness, Kent. She was on a voyage from London to Genoa and Livorno, Grand Duchy of Tuscany.

=== 10 January ===
List of shipwrecks: 10 January 1764
Ship	State	Description
Providence	Great Britain	The ship was wrecked on the Newark Sandbank, in the North Sea off Great Yarmouth, Norfolk. Her crew were rescued. She was on a voyage from Newcastle upon Tyne, Northumberland to Sandwich, Kent.

=== 11 January ===
List of shipwrecks: 11 January 1764
Ship	State	Description
Earl of Holderness	British East India Company	The East Indiaman was wrecked near Deal, Kent. Her crew were rescued. She was on a voyage from London to India.

=== 13 January ===
List of shipwrecks: 13 January 1764
Ship	State	Description
Adventure	Great Britain	The ship was wrecked on The Holmes, in the North Sea off Great Yarmouth, Norfolk. Her crew were rescued. She was on a voyage from Newcastle upon Tyne, Northumberland to London.
Bilboa Packet	Great Britain	The ship was driven ashore in the Cattewater at Plymouth, Devon. She was on a voyage from Exeter, Devon to Bilbao, Spain. She was later refloated.
Blessing	Great Britain	The ship was driven ashore and wrecked in the Cattewater at Plymouth. She was on a voyage from Dartmouth, Devon to Milford, Pembrokeshire.
HMS Nautilus	(Kingdom of Great Britain) Royal Navy	The Sloop-of-War was driven ashore in the Cattewater at Plymouth. She was later refloated.
Sandy Point	Great Britain	The ship was driven ashore in the Cattewater at Plymouth. She was later refloated.

=== 15 January ===
List of shipwrecks: 15 January 1764
Ship	State	Description
James	Great Britain	The ship was driven ashore at Broadfield, Pembrokeshire. She was on a voyage from Bristol. Gloucestershire to Gambia.
King George	Great Britain	The ship was driven ashore on The Swash. She was on a voyage from Falmouth, Cornwall to Bristol.

=== 30 January ===
List of shipwrecks: 30 January 1764
Ship	State	Description
Peggy	Ireland	The ship was lost near Bordeaux, France. She was on a voyage from Cork to Bordeaux.

=== Unknown date ===
List of shipwrecks: Unknown date 1764
Ship	State	Description
Aletta	Great Britain	The ship was driven ashore and severely damaged at Gillkicker Point, Hampshire. She was later refloated.
Betsey	Great Britain	The ship was wrecked on Long Island, British America. She was on a voyage from Hamburg and Newcastle upon Tyne, Northumberland to New York.
Charlford	Ireland	The ship departed from Galway for Belfast in January. No further trace, presumed foundered with the loss of all hands.
Charlotte	Great Britain	The ship was lost on the coat of Yorkshire with the loss of most of her crew. She was on a voyage from Newcastle upon Tyne to Guernsey, Channel Islands.
Dorothy	Great Britain	The ship was driven ashore and wrecked at Spurn Point, Yorkshire with the loss of thirteen of her crew. She was on a voyage from Leith, Lothian to London.
Elizabeth	Great Britain	The ship was lost at Burntisland, Fife. She was on a voyage from Leith to London.
Endeavour	Great Britain	The ship was lost off the coast of France. She was on a voyage from the Charante to the Isle of Man.
Generous Friend	Great Britain	The ship was driven ashore and wrecked at Shoeburyness, Essex. Her crew were rescued. She was on a voyage from Newcastle upon Tyne to London.
Goodwill	Great Britain	The ship foundered in the North Sea off Flamborough Head, Yorkshire. Her crew were rescued. She was on a voyage from Newcastle upon Tyne to London.
Harefield	Great Britain	The ship foundered in Rye Bay with the loss of all hands. She was on a voyage from London to Barcelona, Spain.
John & Catharine	Great Britain	The ship was lost near Liverpool, Lancashire. She was on a voyage from Porto, Portugal to Liverpool.
Mary	Great Britain	The ship was lost near Milford. Her crew were rescued. She was on a voyage from North Carolina, British America to London.
Mary	Ireland	The ship sank at Livorno. Grand Duchy of Tuscany.
Mary and Ann	Great Britain	The ship was wrecked on the coast of France. She was on a voyage from London to Jamaica.
Millbank	Great Britain	The ship was lost on Gotland, Sweden She was on a voyage from Frederikshavn, Denmark to London.
Mount Pleasandt	Great Britain	The ship foundered in The Downs. She was on a voyage from London to Chester, Cheshire.
Nancy	Ireland	The ship was lost near Wexford. She was on a voyage from Lisbon, Portugal to Cork.
Neptune	Great Britain	The ship was driven ashore near Hamburg.
Peggy	Great Britain	The ship was lost on the coast of Africa.
Pensicola Packaet	Great Britain	The ship was driven ashore at Portsmouth, Hampshire. She was on a voyage from London to Pensicola, Florida, British America.
Polly	Great Britain	The ship was lost in St Brides Bay. She was on a voyage from New York, British America to Bristol.
Polly	Great Britain	The ship was lost near Withernsea, Yorkshire. She was on a voyage from Stockholm, Sweden to Leith.
St. Stephen	Great Britain	The ship was lost near Trondheim, Norway. She was on a voyage from Onega, Russia to London.
Thomas and Ann	Ireland	The ship sank at Dublin.
Union	Great Britain	The ship was lost at Cork, Ireland. She was on a voyage from Bristol, Gloucestershire to Galway and Limerick.
Vigilance	Great Britain	The ship was driven ashore and wrecked in Clugan Bay. She was on a voyage from Grenada to Liverpool
William and Mary	Great Britain	The ship was lost in Glenluce Bay. She was on a voyage from Bristol to Glasgow, Renfrewshire.
Young Christian	Great Britain	The ship was lost off Ostend, Dutch Republic. She was on a voyage from Liverpool to Bruges, Dutch Republic.

== February ==
=== 3 February ===
List of shipwrecks: 3 February 1764
Ship	State	Description
John & Marget	Great Britain	The ship was lost 15 nautical miles (28 km) north east of Bayonne, France. Her crew were rescued. She was on a voyage from Dublin, Ireland to Cádiz, Spain.

=== Unknown date ===
List of shipwrecks: Unknown date 1764
Ship	State	Description
Britannia	Great Britain	The ship was lost off the coast of France. Her crew were rescued. She was on a voyage from Philadelphia, Pennsylvania, British America to London.
Duke of Cumberland	Great Britain	The ship was lost at the Isles of Scilly. Her crew were rescued by Betsey (Great Britain.
Hibernia	Ireland	The ship was lost on the coast of France. She was on a voyage from Cork to Bordeaux.
Jannett	Great Britain	The ship was lost on the coast of Portugal. Her crew were rescued. She was on a voyage from London to Cádiz, Spain.
Jonge Cornelis	Dutch Republic	The ship was driven ashore and wrecked at Emden, Prussia. She was on a voyage from London to Rotterdam.
Marquis of Granby	Great Britain	The ship struck a rock near Portland Bill, Dorset and foundered in the English Channel. Her crew were rescued. She was on a voyage from London to Jamaica.
Michmin	Dutch Republic	The ship was driven ashore at Dover, Kent, Great Britain. She was on a voyage from Amsterdam to Nantes, France.
Norwich	Great Britain	The ship was driven ashore at Lowestoft, Suffolk. She was on a voyage from Newcastle upon Tyne, Northumberland to London.
Peterborough	Great Britain	The ship was driven ashore at Porto, Portugal. She was on a voyage from King's Lynn, Norfolk to Porto.
Portugal Packet	Great Britain	The ship was lost on the coast of Brittany, France. She was on a voyage from Seville, Spain to London.
Reeve	Great Britain	The ship was driven ashore near Dover. Her crew were rescued. She was on a voyage from London to Bristol, Gloucestershire.
Three Sisters	Great Britain	The ship was driven ashore and wrecked near Deal Castle, Kent. Her crew were rescued. She was on a voyage from Newcastle upon Tyne to Dunkirk, France.

== March ==
=== 1 March ===
List of shipwrecks: 1 March 1764
Ship	State	Description
Sally	Great Britain	The ship was lost on the English coast. She was on a voyage from Zealand to London.
Triton	Great Britain	The ship sprang a leak and foundered. She was on a voyage from San Sebastián, Spain to London.

=== 2 March ===
List of shipwrecks: 2 March 1764
Ship	State	Description
Katherine & Elizabeth	(Denmark) Norway	The ship foundered in the North Sea off Woodbridge, Suffolk, Great Britain. Her crew were rescued.

=== 6 March ===
List of shipwrecks: 6 March 1764
Ship	State	Description
Charlotte	Great Britain	The ship foundered in the Atlantic Ocean. Her crew were rescued. She was on a voyage from Virginia, British America to London.

=== 18 March ===
List of shipwrecks: 18 March 1764
Ship	State	Description
Peggy	Great Britain	The ship struck rocks and was wrecked off Bermuda. She was on a voyage from South Carolina, British America to Lisbon, Portugal.

=== 20 March ===
List of shipwrecks: 20 March 1764
Ship	State	Description
Winchelsea	British East India Company	The East Indiaman was lost near the mouth of the Bengal River, India.

=== 21 March ===
List of shipwrecks: 21 March 1764
Ship	State	Description
Martin	Great Britain	The ship was driven ashore 5 nautical miles (9.3 km) west of Cowes, Isle of Wight. She was on a voyage from London to Antigua. Martin was later refloated and taken in to Cowes for repairs.

=== 23 March ===
List of shipwrecks: 23 March 1764
Ship	State	Description
Providence	Ireland	The ship was driven ashore at Wexford. She was on a voyage from New York, British America to Dublin.

=== 27 March ===
List of shipwrecks: 27 March 1764
Ship	State	Description
Prince William	Great Britain	The ship capsized at Bilbao, Spain.

=== 30 March ===
List of shipwrecks: 30 March 1764
Ship	State	Description
Adventure	Great Britain	The ship was wrecked on the Haaks Sandbank, in the North Sea off Texel, Dutch Republic. She was on a voyage from Cowes, Isle of Wight to Hamburg.

=== Unknown date ===
List of shipwrecks: Unknown date 1764
Ship	State	Description
Bristol Merchant	Great Britain	The ship was driven ashore at Dublin, Ireland.
Christiana	Sweden	The ship was wrecked on the Sunk Sand, in the North Sea off the coast of Essex, Great Britain. She was on a voyage from London, Great Britain to Stockholm.
City of Derry	Ireland	The ship was driven ashore at Larne, County Antrim.
Elizabeth	Ireland	The ship was driven ashore in the Saltee Islands, County Wexford. She was on a voyage from Bordeaux, France to Dublin.
Gevalia	Sweden	The ship was driven ashore on the coast of Norfolk, Great Britain. She was on a voyage from Hamburg to St. Ubes, Portugal.
Oak	Great Britain	The ship foundered off Domesnes, Norway. Her crew were rescued. She was on a voyage from Gothenburg, Sweden to London.
Sara Juliana	Sweden	The ship was driven ashore at Winterton-on-Sea, Norfolk. She was on a voyage from Gothenburg to the Isle of Man.
Sophia Albertina	Sweden	The ship foundered in The Wash. Her crew survived. She was on a voyage from Gothenburg to Liverpool, Lancashire, Great Britain.
Young Hendrik	Dutch Republic	The ship was driven ashore on the south coast of the Isle of Wight, Great Britain. She was on a voyage from "Sudra", France to Amsterdam. Young Hendrick was later refloated and taken in to Cowes, Isle of Wight for repairs.

== April ==
=== 3 April ===
List of shipwrecks: 3 April 1764
Ship	State	Description
Lady Elizabeth	Hamburg	The ship was in collision with Johanna ( (Kingdom of Great Britain) British America and sank. Her crew were rescued by Johanna. She was on a voyage from Havre de Grâce to Marseille, France.

=== 9 April ===
List of shipwrecks: 9 April 1764
Ship	State	Description
Hector	Great Britain	The ship was wrecked on The Skerries, County Antrim, Ireland with the loss of a crew member. She was on a voyage from Barbados to Liverpool, Lancashire.

=== 10 April ===
List of shipwrecks: 10 April 1764
Ship	State	Description
Jufrow Lucia	Bremen	The ship was wrecked on the Goodwin Sands, Kent, Great Britain with the loss of three of her nine crew. She was on a voyage from Bremen to Glasgow, Renfrewshire, Great Britain.

=== 20 April ===
List of shipwrecks: 20 April 1764
Ship	State	Description
Mary Galley	(Kingdom of Great Britain) Royal Navy	The fifth rate was sunk as a breakwater at Plymouth, Devon

=== 21 April ===
List of shipwrecks: 21 April 1764
Ship	State	Description
Swift	(Kingdom of Great Britain) British America	The ship foundered in the Atlantic Ocean. Her crew were rescued by Harriott (Great Britain) She was on a voyage from South Carolina to London, Great Britain.

=== 28 April ===
List of shipwrecks: 28 April 1764
Ship	State	Description
Triton	Great Britain	The sloop was driven ashore at Kimmeridge, Dorset. She was on a voyage from Cork, Ireland to Rotterdam, Dutch Republic.

=== Unknown date ===
List of shipwrecks: Unknown date 1764
Ship	State	Description
Charles and Mary	Ireland	The ship foundered. Her crew were rescued. She was on a voyage from Cork to Brest, France.
Mary	Great Britain	The brig foundered in the Atlantic Ocean. Her crew were rescued. She was on a voyage from South Carolina, British America to London.
McDowall	Great Britain	The ship wrecked on the Tuskar Rock, County Wexford, Ireland. Her crew were rescued. She was on a voyage from Maryland, British America to Glasgow, Renfrewshire.
Success's Increase	Great Britain	The ship was lost at Scarborough, Yorkshire. She was on a voyage from Sunderland, County Durham to London.
Supply	Great Britain	The ship foundered in Bridlington Bay. She was on a voyage from Bremen to Hull, Yorkshire.
William	Great Britain	The ship ran aground in the River Thames at Pitchers Point and was lost. She was on a voyage from South Carolina, British America to London.
William and Sibella	Great Britain	The ship foundered whilst on a voyage from St Ives to Falmouth, Cornwall. Her crew were rescued.

== May ==
=== 5 May ===
List of shipwrecks: 5 May 1764
Ship	State	Description
Industry	Great Britain	The ship sank off St. Augustine, Florida, British America.

=== 13 May ===
List of shipwrecks: 13 May 1764
Ship	State	Description
Hawke	Great Britain	The ship foundered at Tynemouth, County Durham. Her crew were rescued. She was on a voyage from Leith, Lothian to London.

=== Unknown date ===
List of shipwrecks: Unknown date 1764
Ship	State	Description
Elizabeth	Great Britain	The ship foundered in the Atlantic Ocean. Her crew were rescued by Unity (Great Britain). She was on a voyage from Alicante, Spain to Boston, Massachusetts, British America.
Philazoff	Danzig	The ship was lost at Liverpool, Lancashire. Great Britain. She was on a voyage from Danzig to Liverpool.
Venus	Ireland	The ship capsized off the isles of Scilly. She was towed in bottom upwards. She was on a voyage from New York to Newry, County Antrim.

== June ==
=== 19 June ===
List of shipwrecks: 19 June 1764
Ship	State	Description
Isabella	Great Britain	The ship ran aground and was wrecked in the North Sea off Great Yarmouth, Norfolk. She was on a voyage from South Shields, County Durham to London.

=== Unknown date ===
List of shipwrecks: Unknown date 1764
Ship	State	Description
New-York	Great Britain	The ship was wrecked on the Burbo Bank, in Liverpool Bay. She was on a voyage from South Carolina, British America to Liverpool, Lancashire.

== July ==
=== 4 July ===
List of shipwrecks: 4 July 1764
Ship	State	Description
La Boinard	France	The ship was lost in the Turks Islands. She was on a voyage from Cap-Français, Saint-Domingue to Bordeaux.

=== Unknown date ===
List of shipwrecks: Unknown date 1764
Ship	State	Description
Haabet	Denmark	The ship was lost near Cherbourg, France. She was on a voyage from Lisbon, Portugal to Hamburg.
HMS Swift	Great Britain	The Sloop-of-War was lost on the "Grand Commanders". Her crew were rescued.
Thistle	Great Britain	The ship was lost on the Scottish coast. She was on a voyage from Danzig to Belfast, Ireland.

== August ==
=== 1 August ===
List of shipwrecks: 1 August 1764
Ship	State	Description
Catharine	Great Britain	The sloop foundered off Padstow, Cornwall. Her crew were rescued by Abigain (Great Britain). She was on a voyage from Swansey, Glamorgan to Fowey, Cornwall.

=== 4 August ===
List of shipwrecks: 4 August 1764
Ship	State	Description
Edmond and Mary	Great Britain	The ship foundered in the Baltic Sea off Danzig. Her crew were rescued. She was on a voyage from Stockholm, Sweden to King's Lynn, Norfolk.
Svyatoy Aleksandr Nevsky (Святой Александр Невский, 'St. Alexander Nevsky')	Imperial Russian Navy	The Slava Rossii-class ship of the line was destroyed by fire at Reval with the loss of five of her crew. She caught fire from Svyatoy Pyotr (see below).
Svyatoy Pyotr (Святой Пётр, 'St. Peter')	Imperial Russian Navy	The Slava Rossii-class ship of the line was destroyed by fire at Reval with the loss of six of her crew. The fire started from a gunpowder explosion and also spread to the nearby Svyatoy Aleksandr Nevsky (see above).

=== 15 August ===
List of shipwrecks: 15 August 1764
Ship	State	Description
St. Johannes	Sweden	The ship was driven ashore at Wisby. She was on a voyage from Stockholm to London, Great Britain.

=== Unknown date ===
List of shipwrecks: Unknown date 1764
Ship	State	Description
De Vier Jonckers	Dutch Republic	The ship foundered in the Atlantic Ocean 55 leagues (165 nautical miles (306 km) west of Cape St. Vincent, Spain. Her crew were rescued by Prince George (Great Britain). She was on a voyage from Cádiz, Spain to a Baltic port.
Elizabeth	Great Britain	The ship was lost on the Kentish Knock, in the North Sea.
Elizabeth	Great Britain	The ship foundered off Puerto Rico. She was on a voyage from Antigua to London.
Herman	Bremen	The ship was wrecked in the Weser. She was on a voyage from Bremen to London, Kingdom of Great Britain.
Thornton	Great Britain	The ship was driven ashore on Bornholm, Denmark. She was on a voyage from London to Saint Petersburg, Russia. She was later refloated and taken in to Copenhagen.
Tyger	(Kingdom of Great Britain) British America	The ship foundered in the Atlantic Ocean (32°45′N 15°40′W). Her crew were rescued by Friendship (Great Britain). She was on a voyage from London to North Carolina.

== September ==
=== 5 September ===
List of shipwrecks: 5 September 1764
Ship	State	Description
Lovel	Great Britain	The ship was driven ashore 3 leagues (9 nautical miles (17 km) east of Calais, France. She was on a voyage from Saint Petersburg, Russia to Bristol, Gloucestershire.

=== 26 September ===
List of shipwrecks: 26 September 1764
Ship	State	Description
HMS Anglesea	(Kingdom of Great Britain) Royal Navy	The fifth rate was sunk as a breakwater at Plymouth, Devon.

=== Unknown date ===
List of shipwrecks: Unknown date 1764
Ship	State	Description
Charlotte	Sweden	The ship foundered in the North Sea off Great Yarmouth, Norfolk, Great Britain. She was on a voyage from Stockholm to London, Great Britain.
Christiana Maria	Sweden	The ship was driven ashore at Great Yarmouth. She was on a voyage from Stockholm to Porto, Portugal.
Dolphin	Great Britain	The ship was driven ashore and wrecked on the coast of Zeeland, Dutch Republic. She was on a voyage from Hamburg to the Canary Islands.
Fly Boat	Danzig	The ship foundered in the North Sea. Her crew were rescued by a British vessel. She was on a voyage from Liverpool, Lancashire, Great Britain to Danzig.
Monmouth	Great Britain	The ship was lost at Liverpool. She was on a voyage from Virginia, British America to Liverpool.

== October ==
=== 5 October ===
List of shipwrecks: 5 October 1764
Ship	State	Description
Good-hope	Great Britain	The ship was driven ashore on the coast of Jutland. She was on a voyage from Königsberg, Prussia to Wisbech, Cambridgeshire.
Svyatoy Ioann (Святой Иоанн, 'St. John')	Imperial Russian Navy	The ship was driven ashore and wrecked in the White Sea near the mouth of the ru:Zolotitsa.

=== 10 October ===
List of shipwrecks: 10 October 1764
Ship	State	Description
Henderina Jacoba	Dutch Republic	The ship was lost on the Goodwin Sands, Kent, Great Britain. Her crew were rescued. She was on a voyage from Rotterdam to Bilbao, Spain.

=== 17 October ===
List of shipwrecks: 17 October 1764
Ship	State	Description
Happy Return	Great Britain	The ship was wrecked on the Peveral Ledga, in the English Channel off Swanage, Dorset. Her crew were rescued.

=== 25 October ===
List of shipwrecks: 25 October 1764
Ship	State	Description
Prosperous	Great Britain	The ship was lost near Biddiford, Devon. Her crew were rescued. She was on a voyage from Neath, Glamorgan to Exeter, Devon.

=== 28 October ===
List of shipwrecks: 28 October 1764
Ship	State	Description
True Briton	Great Britain	The ship foundered in the Atlantic Ocean 400 leagues 1,200 nautical miles (2,200 km) west of the Isles of Scilly with the loss of fourteen of her 58 crew. Survivors were rescued by a French snow. She was on a voyage from Havana, Captaincy General of Cuba to London.

=== 29 October ===
List of shipwrecks: 29 October 1764
Ship	State	Description
Nostra Señora de Begona	Great Britain	The ship was lost near Bermeo. She was on a voyage from London, Great Britain to Bilbao.
Burnham	Great Britain	The ship sprang a leak and was abandoned in the Atlantic Ocean off Viana do Castelo, Portugal. Her crew survived. She was on a voyage from Chester, Cheshire to Marseille, France.
Exeter	Great Britain	The ship sprang a leak and was beached near Dover, Kent.
Harwood	Great Britain	The ship was wrecked on the coast of Norway. She was on a voyage from London to a Norwegian port.
Joseph & Betty	Great Britain	The ship was lost in the River Avon. She was on a voyage from Bristol, Gloucestershire to Jamaica.
Kitty	Great Britain	The ship was lost in the Elbe. She was on a voyage from Hamburg to the Canary Islands.
Susanna	Great Britain	The ship was lost on the Kentish Knock. She was on a voyage from Virginia, British America to Hull, Yorkshire.
Warren	Great Britain	The ship was lost on the coast of Norway. She was on a voyage from Narva, Russia to London.

== November ==
=== 1 November ===
List of shipwrecks: 1 November 1764
Ship	State	Description
Damoiselle Maria	Sweden	The ship was lost near Calais, France. She was on a voyage from Gothenburg to Liverpool, Lancashire, Great Britain.

=== 7 November ===
List of shipwrecks: 7 November 1764
Ship	State	Description
Lang Gowenst	Dutch Republic	The ship was lost on the Dutch coast with the loss of all hands. She was on a voyage from Amsterdam to and English port.

=== 9 November ===
List of shipwrecks: 9 November 1764
Ship	State	Description
Molly	Great Britain	The schooner was wrecked in the River Duddon, Lancashire after being abandoned by her crew. She was on a voyage from Philadelphia, Pennsylvania, British America to the Isle of Man.

=== 12 November ===
List of shipwrecks: 12 November 1764
Ship	State	Description
Beulah	Great Britain	The ship was lost off Biddiford, Devon with some loss of life. She was on a voyage from New York, British America to London.

=== 13 November ===
List of shipwrecks: 13 November 1764
Ship	State	Description
Good Intent	Great Britain	The ship was lost near Calais, France. Her crew were rescued. She was on a voyage from Great Yarmouth, Norfolk to Venice.

=== 15 November ===
List of shipwrecks: 15 November 1764
Ship	State	Description
Twelve Children	Great Britain	The ship was abandoned in the North Sea. Her crew were rescued by Resolution. She was on a voyage from Christiansand, Norway to Stockton-on-Tees, County Durham.

=== 18 November ===
List of shipwrecks: 18 November 1764
Ship	State	Description
Thomas and Sally	Great Britain	The ship was driven ashore and wrecked north of Sunderland, County Durham. Her crew were rescued. She was on a voyage from the Dutch Republic to Sunderland.

=== 21 November ===
List of shipwrecks: 21 November 1764
Ship	State	Description
Two ships	Dutch Republic	The ships were wrecked on the Goodwin Sands, Kent, Great Britain.

=== Unknown date ===
List of shipwrecks: Unknown date 1764
Ship	State	Description
Britannia	Great Britain	The ship foundered in the Kattegat. Her crew were rescued. She was on a voyage from Saint Petersburg, Russia to Leith, Lothian.
Favourite	Great Britain	The ship was lost in the Formby Channel with the loss of two of her crew. She was on a voyage from Faro, Portugal to Liverpool, Lancashire.
Granadoes Planter	Great Britain	The ship was driven ashore and wrecked near Boulogne, France with the loss of her captain. She was on a voyage from the Granades to London.
Grant	Great Britain	The ship foundered in the Kattegat. Her crew were rescued. She was on a voyage from Gothenburg, Sweden to Fisherrow, Lothian.
Industry	Great Britain	The ship was wrecked on Oronsay, Inner Hebrides. Her crew were rescued. She was on a voyage from Barbados to Greenock, Renfrewshire.
Johannes	Denmark	The ship was lost in Øresund. Her crew were rescued. She was on a voyage from Saint Croix to Copenhagen.
Lion	Great Britain	The ship was lost on the coast of France. She was on a voyage from Onega, Russia to Bristol, Gloucestershire.
Molly	Great Britain	The ship was driven ashore and wrecked at Campbeltown, Argyllshire. She was on a voyage from Guadeloupe to Lancaster, Lancashire.
Nancy	Great Britain	The ship ran aground in the Humber. She was on a voyeg from London to Hull, Yorkshire.
New Britannia	Great Britain	The ship was driven ashore at St. Ives, Cornwall. She was on a voyage from Saint Petersburg to Bristol.
Pearl	Great Britain	The ship was wrecked on the Goodwin Sands, Kent with the loss of a crew member. She was on a voyage from Bristol to Gothenburg.
Richmond	Great Britain	The ship was driven ashore and wrecked at Douglas, Isle of Man. She was on a voyage from Liverpool to Africa.
St. Juan Baptista y Animas	Spain	The ship was driven ashore and wrecked near Caien, France. She was on a voyage from St. Andero to London.
Sandwich	Great Britain	The ship was lost on the Grassholmes. Her crew were rescued. She was on a voyage from Narva, Russia to London.
Sarah	Great Britain	The ship was lost inn the Elbe with the loss of five of her crew.
Success	Great Britain	The ship struck the Knowl Sand, in the North Sea off Great Yarmouth, Norfolk and foundered. She was on a voyage from Newcastle upon Tyne, Northumberland to Plymouth, Devon.
Tarter	Great Britain	The ship was driven ashore at Fort-Mardyck, Kingdom of France. she was on a voyage from Newcastle upon Tyne, Northumberland to Pool, Dorset.
Taunton	Great Britain	The ship was lost on Crosby Point, Lancashire. Her crew were rescued. She was on a voyage from Dublin, Ireland to Liverpool.
Unity	Great Britain	The ship was driven ashore at Eastaples, France. She was on a voyage from Trieste, Republic of Venice to London.

== December ==
=== 5 December ===
List of shipwrecks: 5 December 1764
Ship	State	Description
Samuel	Great Britain	The brig was lost near Newhaven, Sussex. Her crew were rescued. She was on a voyage from Lymington, Hampshire to Great Yarmouth, Norfolk.

=== 14 December ===
List of shipwrecks: 14 December 1764
Ship	State	Description
Loving Friends	Great Britain	The ship foundered in the Atlantic Ocean. Her crew took to the boats and were rescued five days later by Cato (Great Britain). She was on a voyage from Canso Bay to London.

=== 19 December ===
List of shipwrecks: 19 December 1764
Ship	State	Description
Henrietta	(Kingdom of Great Britain) British America	The sloop was driven ashore at Bear Inlet, North Carolina. She was on a voyage from Wilmington, North Carolina to the New River.
Three Brothers	Great Britain	The ship was driven ashore and wrecked at Tinmouth Castle, Northumberland. Her crew were rescued. She was on a voyage from Sunderland, County Durham to London.

=== Unknown date ===
List of shipwrecks: Unknown date 1764
Ship	State	Description
Betty	Great Britain	The ship was lost on the coast of Cornwall with the loss of all but one of her crew. She was on a voyage from Saint Kitts to London.
Buss Anson	Great Britain	The ship was wrecked on the Rope Sand, in the North Sea off Great Yarmouth, Norfolk. Her crew were rescued. She was on a voyage from Hamburg to London.
Dakeing	Great Britain	The ship was lost near Bridlington, Yorkshire. She was on a voyage from London to Stockton-on-Tees, County Durham.
Duke of Cumberland	Great Britain	The ship was wrecked in Almeria Bay with the loss of her captain. She was on a voyage from Newfoundland, British America to Alicant, Spain.
Diamond	Great Britain	The ship was driven ashore at Bridlington. She was on a voyage from South Shields, County Durham to London.
Eagle	Great Britain	The ship was lost in the Isles of Scilly. She was on a voyage from Saint Petersburg, Russia to Bristol, Gloucestershire.
Elizabeth	Great Britain	The ship was lost off Barbossa, Spain. She was on a voyage from Newfoundland, British America to Cádiz, Spain.
Elizabeth	Great Britain	The ship was lost on the coast of Jutland with the loss of her captain. Sge was on a voyage from Danzig to Montrose, Forfarshire.
Elizabeth and Christina	Great Britain	The ship was lost on Öland, Sweden. She was on a voyage from Danzig to London.
Endraght	Dutch Republic	The ship was lost near Rye, Sussex, Great Britain. She was on a voyage from Surinam to Amsterdam.
Friendship	Great Britain	The ship foundered in the Atlantic Ocean off Figueira da Foz, Portugal. She was on a voyage from Newfoundland to Cádiz.
George	Great Britain	The ship was lost near Rye.
Hope	Great Britain	The ship was lost on Skagen, Denmark. She was on a voyage from Danzig to Chester, Cheshire.
Jufro Catharina Margaretta	Dutch Republic	The ship foundered in the North Sea off Great Yarmouth with the loss of her captain. She was on a voyage from "Wyburgh" to Cádiz.
Prince of Great Britain	Great Britain	The ship was lost on the Nass Sands, Wales with the loss of all but one of her crew. She was on a voyage from Bordeaux, France to Bristol.
Sandwich	Great Britain	The ship was driven ashore and wrecked at Sandwich, Kent. She was on a voyage from Sunderland, County Durham to Sandwich.
St Nicholas	Russia	The ship was driven ashore on the coast of Lincolnshire, Great Britain. She was on a voyage from Saint Petersburg to London.

== Unknown date ==
List of shipwrecks: Unknown date 1764
Ship	State	Description
Adventure	Great Britain	The ship foundered. Her crew were rescued. She was on a voyage from "Ivica" to a Baltic port.
Augustus Cæsar	Great Britain	The ship was lost on Grand Cayman. Her crew were rescued. She was on a voyage from Jamaica to London.
Barrington	Great Britain	The ship was lost at Venice. She was on a voyage from Falmouth, Cornwall to Venice.
Betsey	(Kingdom of Great Britain) British America	The ship was lost on the Virginia Capes before 5 April. She was on a voyage from North Carolina to Virginia.
Bristol Merchant	Great Britain	The ship was lost at Louisbourg, Nova Scotia, French America. Her crew were rescued. She was on a voyage from Bristol to Quebec.
Brothers	Great Britain	The ship was lost off the Virginia Capes. She was on a voyage from Virginia to London.
Dispatch	Great Britain	The ship foundered in the Atlantic Ocean. Her crew were rescued by Peter Beckford (Great Britain). She was on a voyage from Lancaster, Lancashire to Africa.
Eagle	Great Britain	The ship capsized. Her crew were rescued. She was on a voyage from Carolina, British America to Antigua.
Edgar	Great Britain	The ship was lost in the Martha Brae River, Jamaica.
Greyhound	Great Britain	The ship was lost in the Gulf of Saint Lawrence. Her crew were rescued. She was on a voyage from Liverpool, Lancashire to Quebec.
Industry	Great Britain	The ship was lost at St. Augustine, Florida, British America. All on board were rescued.
Lord Elbank	Great Britain	The ship was lost near Gaspé, Quebec. She was on a voyage from New York, British America to Quebec.
Lucca	Republic of Lucca	The ship was driven ashore and wrecked on the north coast of Jamaica. She was on a voyage from Lucca to Saint Croix.
Marselleros	Great Britain	The ship struck a rock and foundered off Gibraltar.
Mary	Great Britain	The ship foundered in the Bay of Honduras. She was on a voyage from Jamaica to British Honduras.
HMS Mohawk	(Kingdom of Great Britain) Royal Navy	The snow was lost in the Great Lakes, British America.
Molly	Great Britain	The ship was lost on Cumberland Island, Georgia, British America. Her crew survived. She was on a voyage from Jamaica to Georgia.
Norfolk	Great Britain	The ship departed from London in late 1763 or early 1764, bound for Bombay, India. No further trace, presumed foundered with the loss of all hands.
Polly	(Kingdom of Great Britain)	The ship sank after her launch. She was later refloated, repaired and entered service.
Shannon	Great Britain	The ship was wrecked at Currituck Sound, North Carolina before 31 March. Her crew were rescued. she was on a voyage from Virginia to Glasgow, Renfrewshire.
Shoreham	Great Britain	The slave ship was lost on the coast of Senegal with the loss of all but three of her crew. She was on a voyage from Senegal to the West Indies.
St. George	Great Britain	The ship was lost in the Piscataqua River, New Hampshire, British America. She was on a voyage from Boston, Massachusetts to the Piscataqua River.
Sv. Ioann	Russian Empire	The vessel was looted and burned by Aleut natives while anchored in Nikolski Bay, Umnak Island, Alaska sometime during the winter of 1763–1764.
Sv. Nikolai	Russian Empire	The vessel was attacked and likely destroyed by Aleut natives in Isanotski Strait, Alaska in late 1763 or early 1764.
