= Broadstreet bully =

Broadstreet bully or broad street bullies may refer to:

- Tony Stetson (wrestler; born 1959; stagename: "The Broad Street Bully"), a U.S. pro-wrestler
- The Broad Street Bully (album), a 2009 album by Beanie Sigel
- Philadelphia Flyers, an NHL ice hockey team nicknamed the "Broad Street Bullies" in the 1970s
- Broad Street Bullies (film), a 2010 documentary film about the 1970s Philadelphia Flyers

== See also ==
- Broad Street (disambiguation)
- Broad (disambiguation)
- Street (disambiguation)
- Bully (disambiguation)
