= New Hedges =

Village in Pembrokeshire, Wales

Coordinates: 51.690584°N 4.712053°W

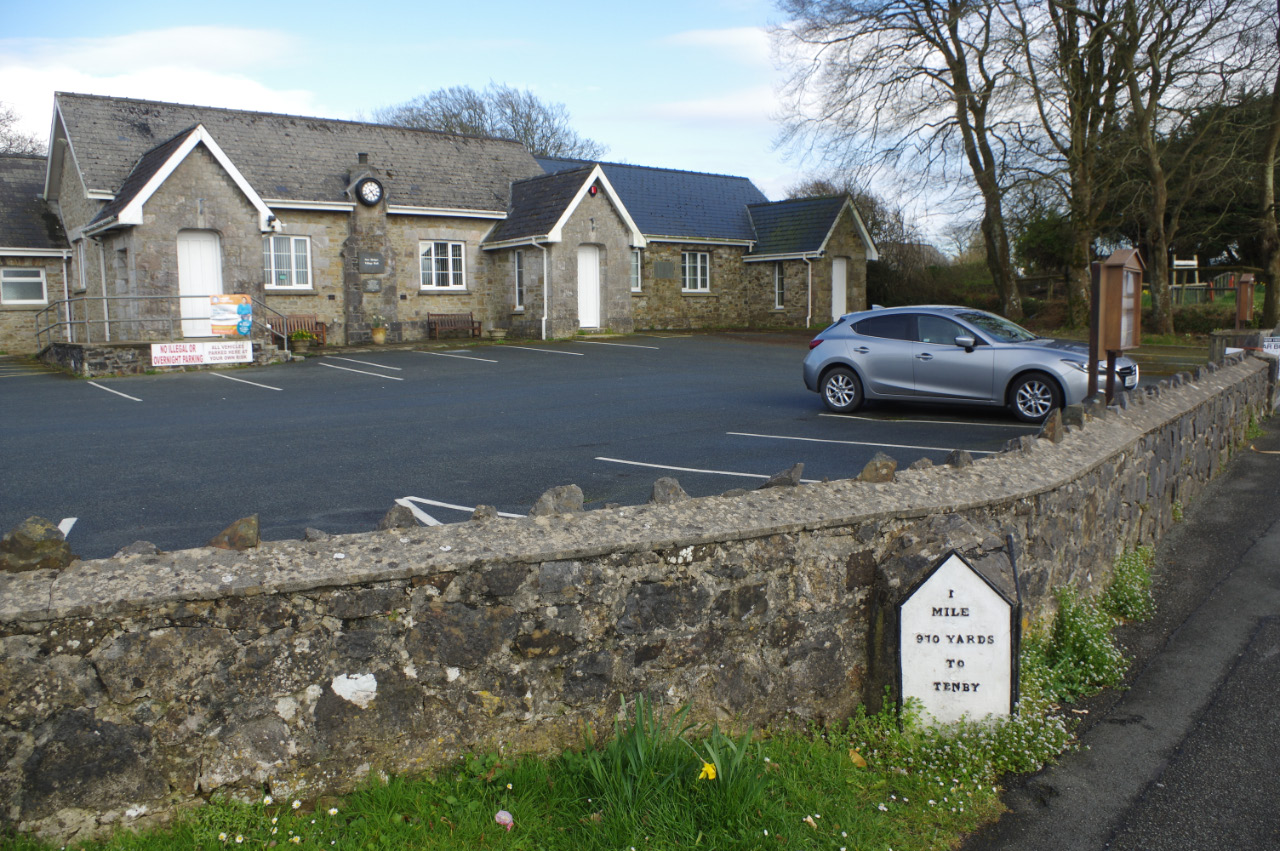
- New Hedges Village Hall

- Location within Pembrokeshire
- Community: St Mary Out Liberty
- Principal area: Pembrokeshire
- Preserved county: Dyfed
- Country: Wales
- Sovereign state: United Kingdom
- Post town: TENBY
- Postcode district: SA70
- Dialling code: 01834
- Police: Dyfed-Powys
- Fire: Mid and West Wales
- Ambulance: Welsh

New Hedges is a village in the community of St Mary Out Liberty, Pembrokeshire, Wales. It is midway between the coastal towns of Saundersfoot and Tenby. It lies astride the main A478 road that links Tenby with Cardigan and is a short distance from the Pembrokeshire Coast Path.

== Description ==
The eastern part of the village lies within the Pembrokeshire Coast National Park, whose 2007 settlements capacity study describes New Hedges:

a medium-sized linear village settlement set within undulating landform along the A478, with the older part of the village by-passed by a new straight line. There is no tangible sense of place and the character has been much modified by the extensive caravan parks all along its western side and to the east and southeast. The eastern edge of the village adjoins the National Park boundary. There are limited views east towards the coast.

== Demographics ==
The population was 594 in 2011.

== Amenities ==
The village has a bar-restaurant, the Hunters Moon, formerly called New Hedges Tavern. There is a Post Office. New Hedges Saundersfoot Football Club is a Pembrokeshire amateur league club. Its badge features a pick, remembering the coal mining history of the area.

New Hedges Village Hall hosts the Community Council's bi-monthly meetings; the hall, which was a school from 1853 to 1961, has its own committee and independent charitable status. The building was renovated in the 1980s and extended in 2007. It is used by many organisations.

== Listed buildings ==
To the west of the village is Knightston Farmhouse, with attached malthouse and bakery and a cart shed, all of which are listed buildings. The farm is early 19th century.
