= Broad Road =

Broad Road or Broadroad may refer to:

== Places ==
- Broad Road, a portion of the R236 road (Ireland)
- Broad Road, a portion of New Brunswick Route 7, New Brunswick, Canada
- Broad Road, a portion of County Route 62 (Onondaga County, New York), USA
- Broad Road, the former name of Dornoch Terrace, that now remains as Dornoch Terrace Bridge, West End, Queensland, Australia

== Other uses ==
- The Broad Road (film), 1923 U.S. film
- "Song of the Broad Road" (Chinese: 大路歌; lit. 'Broad Road Song'), a 1934 song by Nie Er

== See also ==
- Broad Avenue, Memphis, Tennessee, USA
