= Broad Sound =

Broad Sound can refer to:

- Broad Sound (Queensland), on the Australian coast
- Broad Sound (Maine), near Portland, Maine, United States
- Broad Sound (Massachusetts), near Boston, Massachusetts, United States
