= Broad Bay Manor =

Historic house in Virginia

Coordinates: 36.893°N 76.044°W

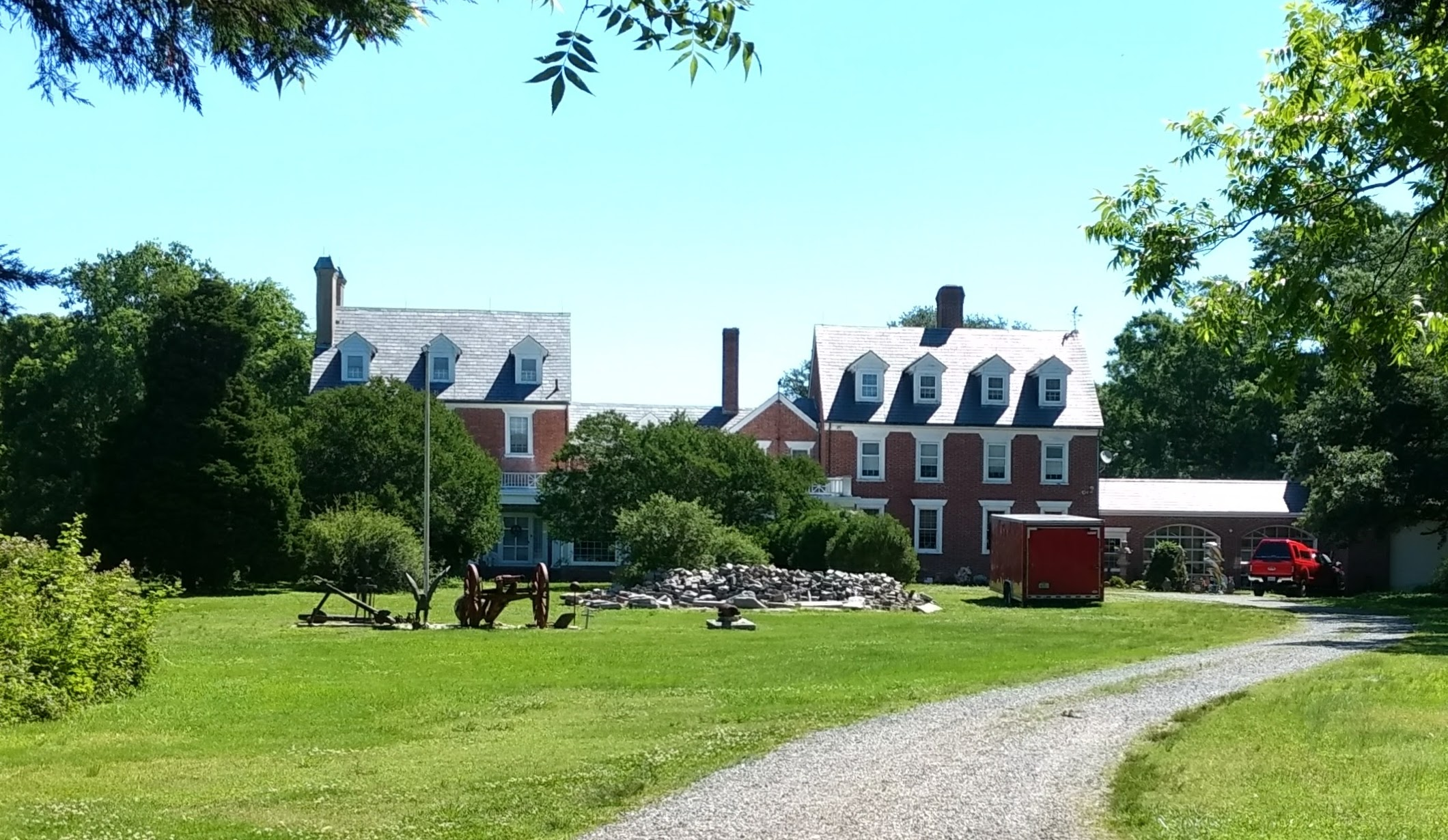
Broad Bay Manor in 2017

Broad Bay Manor in Virginia Beach is a historic manor house which is purportedly the oldest extant European-built house in the southeastern United States. Thomas Allen built the small center portion of the current larger house in circa 1640 of Flemish bond brick on land granted to him by Governor Thomas West, 3rd Baron De La Warr or his brother John West. It is still a private residence and is located in the Broad Bay Colony part of northeastern Virginia Beach

== See also ==
- List of the oldest buildings in Virginia
