= James Broad (disambiguation) =

James Broad may refer to:

- James Broad (cricketer) (1814–1888), English cricketer
- James Broad (1958–2001), American heavyweight boxer
- Jimmy Broad (1891–1963), English footballer
- James Broad (died 2020), musician with the band Silver Sun
