= Broad (surname) =

Broad is a surname. Notable people with the surname include:

- Alfred Scott Broad (1854–1929), South Australian artist
- Alice Broad (fl. 1661–1664), British, first female printer in York, England
- C. D. Broad (1887–1971), English philosopher known for Scientific Thought (1930)
- Chris Broad (cricketer) (born 1957), former English cricketer and match referee
- Chris Broad (YouTuber) (born 1990), British YouTuber, filmmaker and podcast host
- Eli Broad (1933–2021), American billionaire and philanthropist
- Frank Broad (1874–1956), British politician
- James Broad (disambiguation), multiple people
- Lindsey Broad, American television, stage, and film actress
- Neil Broad (born 1966), South African-born tennis player
- Nick Broad (died 2013), English nutritionist
- Pery Broad (1921–1993), Brazilian SS officer at Auschwitz concentration camp
- Shane Broad (born 1976), Australian politician and rower
- Stephen Broad (born 1980), former English footballer
- Stuart Broad (born 1986), English cricketer, son of the cricketer, Chris Broad
- Billy Idol (born 1955), real name William Albert Michael Broad
- William Broad (born 1951), The New York Times writer
