= Broad Bay =

Broad Bay may refer to the following locations:

New Zealand

- Broad Bay, New Zealand, a settlement and bay on the Otago Peninsula

Norway

- Broad Bay, the former name of Breibogen in Spitsbergen ("Breibogen" is the Norwegian translation of "Broad Bay")

United Kingdom

- Broad Bay, Lewis, a bay in the Outer Hebrides

United States

- Broad Bay, a former name of Waldoboro, Maine
- Broad Bay (New Hampshire), a lake in New Hampshire
- Broad Bay Colony, a location in Virginia Beach, Virginia
- Broadbay Township, Forsyth County, North Carolina
