= St Mary Out Liberty =

Community in Pembrokeshire, Wales

- Location within Pembrokeshire
- Population: 862 (2011)
- Principal area: Pembrokeshire
- Preserved county: Dyfed
- Country: Wales
- Sovereign state: United Kingdom
- Post town: TENBY
- Postcode district: SA70
- Dialling code: 01834
- Police: Dyfed-Powys
- Fire: Mid and West Wales
- Ambulance: Welsh
- List of places UK Wales Pembrokeshire 51.690584°N 4.712053°W Map of the community

St Mary Out Liberty (also known as Tenby St Mary Out Liberty) is a community in the southeast of Pembrokeshire, Wales. The community was established in 1974 under changes in local government organisation and has its own community council. It is included, with St Mary In Liberty, in the parish of Tenby. The community includes the villages of New Hedges, Broadfield, Gumfreston plus small parts of Tenby and Saundersfoot.

== History ==
The name Out Liberty refers to the fact that this part of the parish was outside the borough of Tenby. The name dates as least as far back as the 1834 Poor Law, when the area was responsible for its own poor. In 1881 the majority of males in the parish were occupied in agriculture. In 1932 part of the area was transferred to St Mary In Liberty.

Apart from the parish church, the community contains three listed buildings: Knightston Farmhouse, the attached malthouse and bakery, and a cart shed. The farm is early 19th century.

Records for the community from 1974 to 2012 are held in the Pembrokeshire Archives at the County Records Office in Haverfordwest.

== Community ==
The community is bordered by East Williamston, Saundersfoot, Tenby and St Florence. Part of Saundersfoot and Tenby lie within the community. The elected Community Council meets bi-monthly at New Hedges Village Hall, which has its own committee and independent charitable status.

== St Mary's Church ==
The church, after which the community is named, dates at least to the 13th century and is the parish church of Tenby. The present building is a Grade I listed building.
