= Broad Bay Colony =

Unincorporated community in Virginia, United States

Coordinates: 36°54′16″N 76°3′32″W

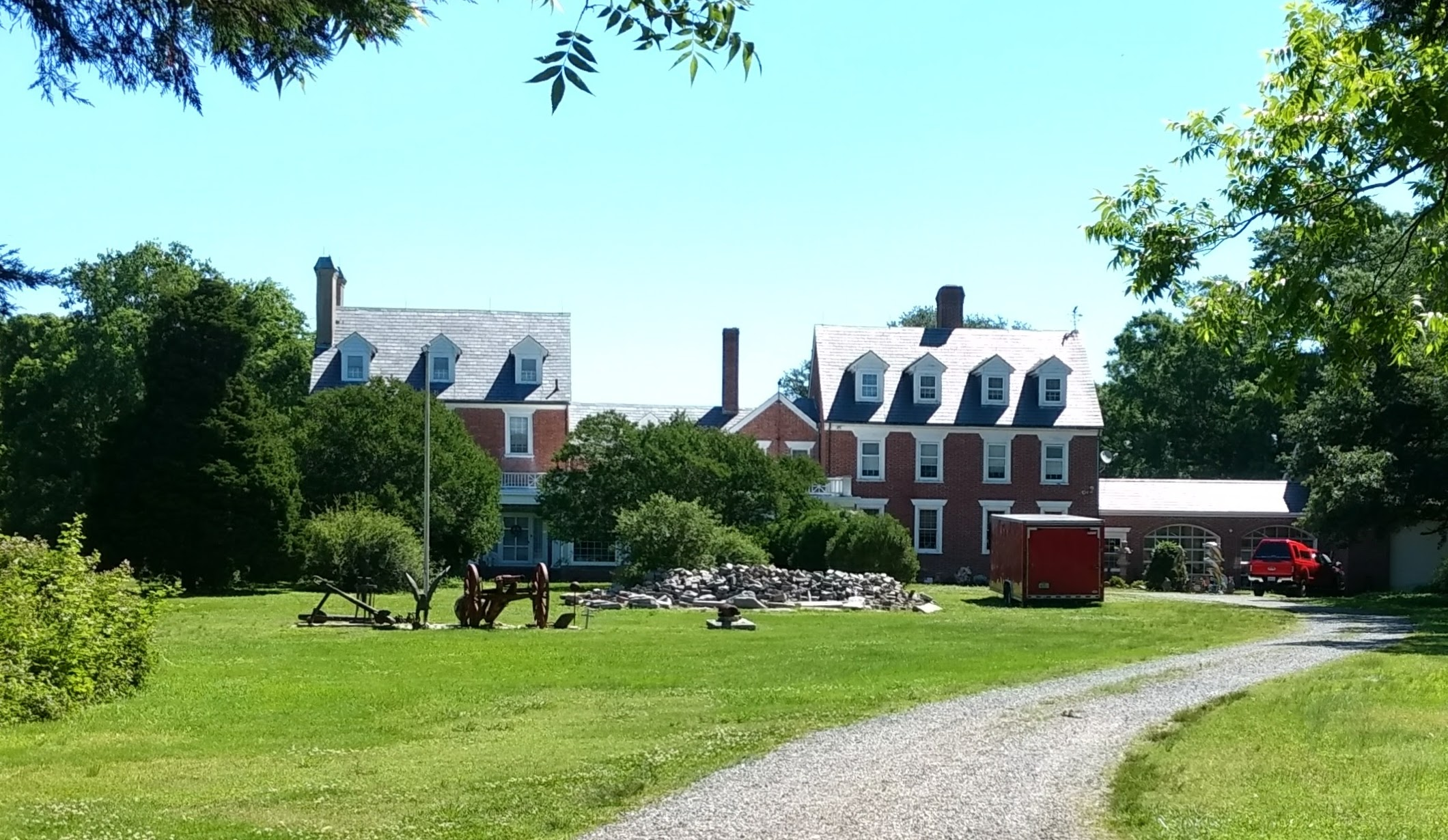
Broad Bay Manor in 2017

Broad Bay Colony is a fairly affluent unincorporated community in northeast Virginia Beach, Virginia. Broad Bay Manor is located in the community.
