= Broadmere =

Hamlet in Hampshire, England

Coordinates: 51.216666°N 1.116667°W

- Location within Hampshire
- OS grid reference: SU6179246756
- District: Basingstoke and Deane
- Shire county: Hampshire
- Region: South East
- Country: England
- Sovereign state: United Kingdom
- Post town: Basingstoke
- Postcode district: RG25 2
- Dialling code: 01256
- Police: Hampshire and Isle of Wight
- Fire: Hampshire and Isle of Wight
- Ambulance: South Central
- UK Parliament: Basingstoke

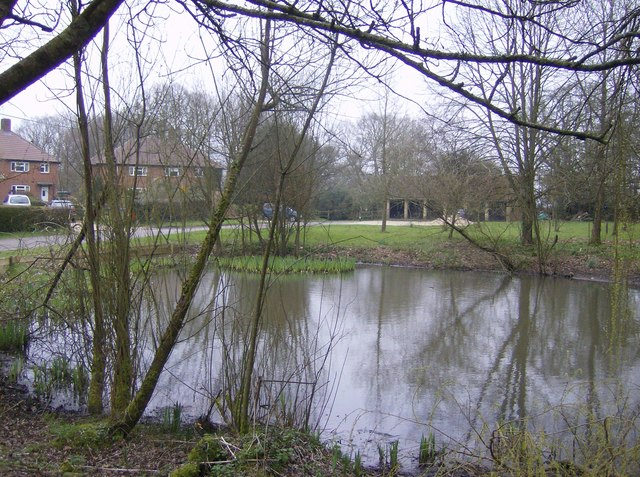
The pond at Broadmere

Broadmere is a hamlet in Hampshire, England. The hamlet comes under the parish of Farleigh Wallop and its nearest town is Basingstoke, about 2 miles away.
