= James Broad (cricketer) =

English cricketer

Personal information
- Born: 9 May 1814; Cobham, Kent
- Died: 27 December 1888 (aged 74); Cobham, Kent

Domestic team information
- Years: Team
- 1854: Kent County Cricket Club
- Only First-class: 24 August 1854 Kent v United England Eleven
- Source: CricInfo, 30 December 2021

James Broad (9 May 1814 – 27 December 1888) was an English cricketer who played one first-class cricket match for Kent County Cricket Club in 1854.

Broad was born at Cobham, Kent in 1814, the son of William and Sarah Broad. He was a butcher by trade and played regular club cricket for Cobham Cricket Club, a strong club in Kent cricket at the time. He is recorded as having played in at least 31 matches between 1849 and 1864 as an allrounder who frequently opened the batting.

Broad made his only appearance for Kent against a United England Eleven at The Bat and Ball Ground in Gravesend, close to his home. He was one of fifteen players on the Kent team in the match. (Note: This match is not considered first-class by Kent County Cricket Club as it featured a team with more than 12 players (described as an "odds match"). It is considered first-class by other authorities.)

Broad married Mary Bradbear in 1840. He died at Cobham in 1888 aged 74.

== Bibliography ==
- Carlaw, Derek (2020). Kent County Cricketers, A to Z: Part One (1806–1914) (PDF). Cardiff: ACS.
