= Broad Creek, North Carolina =

- Census-designated place
- Location within North Carolina
- Coordinates: 34°43′50″N 76°55′27″W
- Country: United States
- State: North Carolina
- County: Carteret

Area
  - Total: 3.12 sq mi (8.07 km^{2})
  - Land: 3.11 sq mi (8.05 km^{2})
  - Water: 0.012 sq mi (0.03 km^{2})
- Elevation: 33 ft (10 m)

Population (2020)
  - Total: 1,968
  - Density: 633.4/sq mi (244.55/km^{2})
- Time zone: UTC-5 (Eastern (EST))
  - Summer (DST): UTC-4 (EDT)
- ZIP code: 28570 (Newport)
- Area code: 252
- FIPS code: 37-08040
- GNIS feature ID: 2628615

Broad Creek is an unincorporated area and census-designated place (CDP) in Carteret County, North Carolina, United States. As of the 2020 census, Broad Creek had a population of 1,968. It is part of the Greater Newport area and currently shares the Newport ZIP Code of 28570.

== Geography ==
Broad Creek is located in west-central Carteret County, on the north shore of Bogue Sound, between the tidal inlets of Broad Creek to the west and Gales Creek to the east. Bogue Sound is separated from the Atlantic Ocean to the south by Bogue Banks, part of North Carolina's barrier islands known as the Crystal Coast. The Broad Creek community is bordered on the north by Croatan National Forest.

North Carolina Highway 24 passes through the community, leading east 12 miles (19 km) to Morehead City and west 8 miles (13 km) to Cape Carteret. Newport is 7 miles (11 km) to the northeast up Hibbs Road. 9 Mile Road runs north from Broad Creek, providing a direct route to Havelock, 13 miles (21 km) to the north. Broad Creek Loop Road forms a loop through the center of the community, south of NC 24.

The Broad Creek CDP has a total area of 3.1 square miles (8.1 km^{2}), of which 0.01 square miles (0.03 km^{2}), or 0.35%, is water.

Housing developments in Broad Creek include Salty Shores, Croatan Colony, Rolling Wood, Fox Lair, Bogue Pines, Whispering Pines, Karobi Park, Adams Harbor, Pearson Circle, Bar Harbor, Bluewater Banks.

== Demographics ==
Historical population
| Census | Pop. | Note | %± |
|---|---|---|---|
| 2020 | 1,968 | | — |
U.S. Decennial Census

=== 2020 census ===
As of the 2020 census, Broad Creek had a population of 1,968. The median age was 50.0 years. 19.3% of residents were under the age of 18 and 21.4% of residents were 65 years of age or older. For every 100 females there were 86.2 males, and for every 100 females age 18 and over there were 87.5 males age 18 and over.

91.4% of residents lived in urban areas, while 8.6% lived in rural areas.

There were 809 households in Broad Creek, of which 25.1% had children under the age of 18 living in them. Of all households, 53.8% were married-couple households, 15.5% were households with a male householder and no spouse or partner present, and 23.7% were households with a female householder and no spouse or partner present. About 24.8% of all households were made up of individuals and 10.6% had someone living alone who was 65 years of age or older.

There were 1,287 housing units, of which 37.1% were vacant. The homeowner vacancy rate was 2.4% and the rental vacancy rate was 7.0%.

Racial composition as of the 2020 census
| Race | Number | Percent |
|---|---|---|
| White | 1,742 | 88.5% |
| Black or African American | 41 | 2.1% |
| American Indian and Alaska Native | 14 | 0.7% |
| Asian | 8 | 0.4% |
| Native Hawaiian and Other Pacific Islander | 1 | 0.1% |
| Some other race | 49 | 2.5% |
| Two or more races | 113 | 5.7% |
| Hispanic or Latino (of any race) | 113 | 5.7% |

== Education ==
- Bogue Sound Elementary School
- Broad Creek Middle School
- Croatan High School
