= Bromley Green =

Hamlet in Kent, England

Coordinates: 51.0925°N 0.8564°E

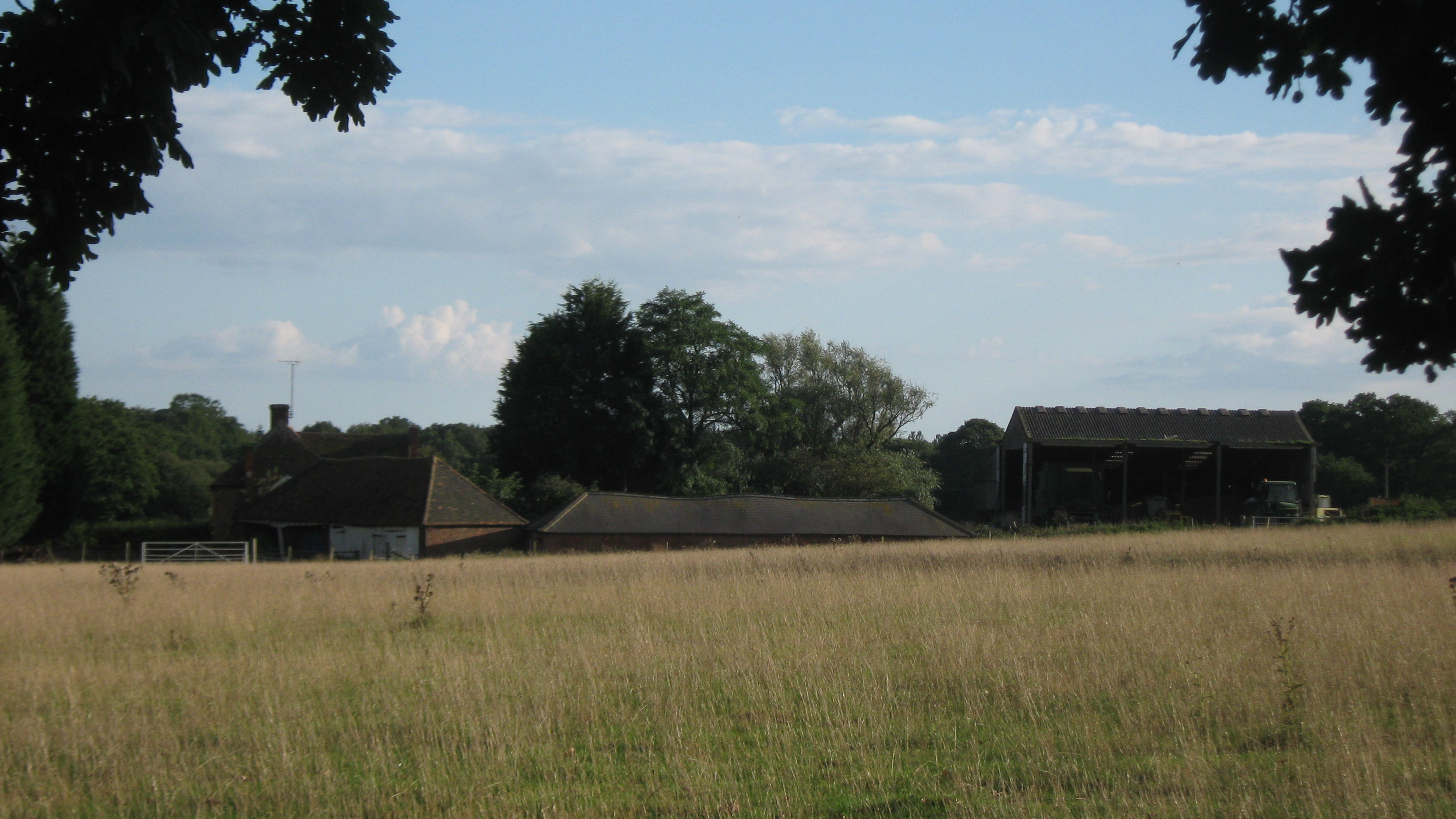
- Bromley Green Farm

- Location within Kent
- Civil parish: Ruckinge
- District: Ashford
- Shire county: Kent
- Region: South East
- Country: England
- Sovereign state: United Kingdom
- Police: Kent
- Fire: Kent
- Ambulance: South East Coast
- UK Parliament: Weald of Kent

Bromley Green is a hamlet in the civil parish of Ruckinge, 3 miles (5 km) south of Ashford in Kent, England.
