= Broad Creek (Bogue Sound) =

Stream in North Carolina, USA

Broad Creek Tributary to Bogue Sound
- Location of Broad Creek mouth

Location
- Country: United States
- State: North Carolina
- County: Carteret

Physical characteristics
- Source: confluence of East and West Prongs of Broad Creek
  - location: Broad Creek, North Carolina
  - coordinates: 34°48′06″N 076°29′24″W
  - elevation: 0 ft (0 m)
- Mouth: Bogue Sound
  - location: Broad Creek, North Carolina
  - coordinates: 34°47′57″N 076°29′12″W
  - elevation: 0 ft (0 m)
- Length: 0.76 mi (1.22 km)
- Basin size: 6.28 square miles (16.3 km^{2})
- Discharge
  - location: Bogue Sound
  - average: 10.77 cu ft/s (0.305 m^{3}/s) at mouth with Bogue Sound

Basin features
- Progression: Broad → Bogue → Atlantic Ocean
- River system: White Oak River
- Tributaries
  - left: East Prong of Broad Creek
  - right: West Prong of Broad Creek

Broad Creek is a water body bordering the community of Broad Creek, North Carolina. The creek empties into Bogue Sound, which is separated from the Atlantic Ocean by Bogue Banks, part of North Carolina's barrier islands known as the Southern Outer Banks. The creek also runs through the Croatan National Forest.

== See also ==
- Broad Creek, North Carolina
