= Broad Front =

Broad Front (which is the translation from Spanish of both Frente Grande and Frente Amplio) may refer to:

- Broad Front (Argentina), Argentine political party
- Broad Front UNEN, Defunct Argentine political coalition
- Broad Front (Chilean political coalition), defunct Chilean coalition of parties
- Broad Front (Chilean political party), Chilean party
- Broad Front (Costa Rica), Costa Rican political party
- Broad Front (Dominican Republic), Dominican Republic political party
- Broad Front (Paraguay), Paraguayan political party
- Broad Front (Peru), Peruvian political party
- Broad Front (Spain), Spanish electoral alliance
- Broad Front (Uruguay), Uruguayan coalition of parties
- Broad Front for Democracy, Panamanian political party
- Socialist Party – Broad Front of Ecuador, Ecuadorian political party
- Broad front versus narrow front controversy in World War II
