= Brockbridge =

Hamlet in Hampshire, England

Coordinates: 50.9667°N 1.1333°W

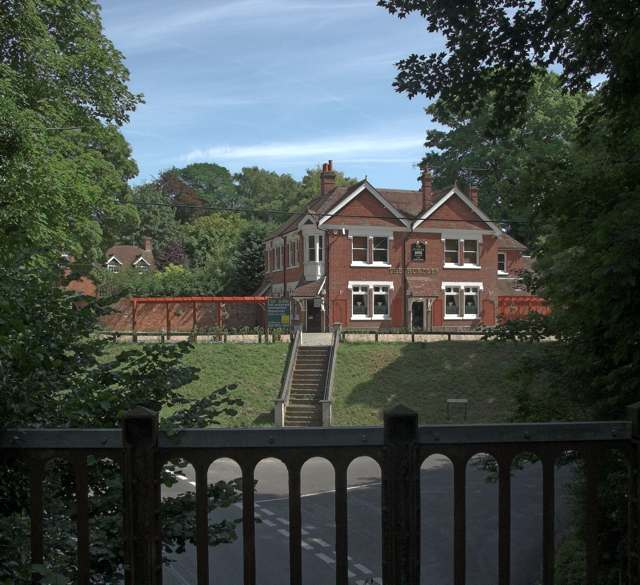
- Pub and road junction at Brockbridge

- Location within Hampshire
- OS grid reference: SU6095518940
- Civil parish: Soberton
- District: Winchester
- Shire county: Hampshire
- Region: South East
- Country: England
- Sovereign state: United Kingdom
- Post town: Bishops Waltham
- Postcode district: SO32
- Dialling code: 01962
- Police: Hampshire and Isle of Wight
- Fire: Hampshire and Isle of Wight
- Ambulance: South Central
- UK Parliament: Winchester

Brockbridge is a hamlet in Hampshire, England, in the South Downs National Park . All parts are between a .5-mile (0.80 km) to 1-mile (1.6 km) walk across two footbridges or one road bridge to Droxford. Its nearest town is Bishops Waltham, approximately 4 miles (6.4 km) west and the community's Council taxpayers by law contribute to the small parish precept of Soberton Civil Parish Council. It is entitled to enjoy the playgrounds, village hall, sports and parish amenities of Soberton, its civil (and in the Church of England ecclesiastical) parish which is centred approximately 2 miles (3.2 km) away.
