= Broad Run =

Broad Run may refer to a place in the United States:

Streams

- Broad Run (Little Muncy Creek), in Lycoming County, Pennsylvania
- Broad Run (Loudoun County, Virginia), a tributary of the Potomac River
- Broad Run (Maryland), a tributary of the Potomac River
- Broad Run (Occoquan River), a tributary of the Occoquan River in Virginia
- Broad Run (White Clay Creek), a tributary of White Clay Creek in Pennsylvania

Other places

- Broad Run (conservation area), a wildland in western Virginia
- Broad Run Golfer's Club, West Bradford Township, Chester County, Pennsylvania
- Broad Run, Maryland, an unincorporated community in Frederick County, Maryland
- Broad Run Reservoir, Nesquehoning, Carbon County, Pennsylvania
- Broad Run, Virginia, a community in Fauquier County
- Broad Run (VRE station), a railway station in Prince William County, Virginia
- Broad Run High School, Ashburn, Loudoun County, Virginia
