= Broad Dyke =

Dyke built by the Dutch in 1655 in New Castle, Delaware

Coordinates: 39°39′48″N 75°33′39″W

Broad Dyke, originally called Horse Dyke is an original dyke built on the Northern bank of the Delaware River by the Dutch in 1655 in New Castle, Delaware. This 60 acre property is the center of a twelve-mile circle that form the arc of the border between Delaware and Pennsylvania. In 1701 in an effort to clarify the border between Delaware and Pennsylvania William Penn sent Cornelius Empson, Richard Hallowell and John Richardson as justices of the county of New Castle and Caleb Pusey, Phillip Roman and Robert Pyle as justices of the county of Chester to survey the border. These six men agreed that Broad Dyke would serve as the center of the twelve mile circle whose arc forms the border between Pennsylvania and Delaware. The property containing the Dyke was acquired by a local church in 1719 and is still under the ownership of said church.

== Modern Day ==
Currently the Dyke and surrounding wetlands are the focal point of conservation efforts by the Trust for Public Land. The Dyke is also used as a fishing spot by locals. The region is also used to link the towns Riverwalk Bike trail and multiple historic sites.
