= Broadfields Estate =

Area in London, England

Coordinates: 51.6268°N 0.2732°W

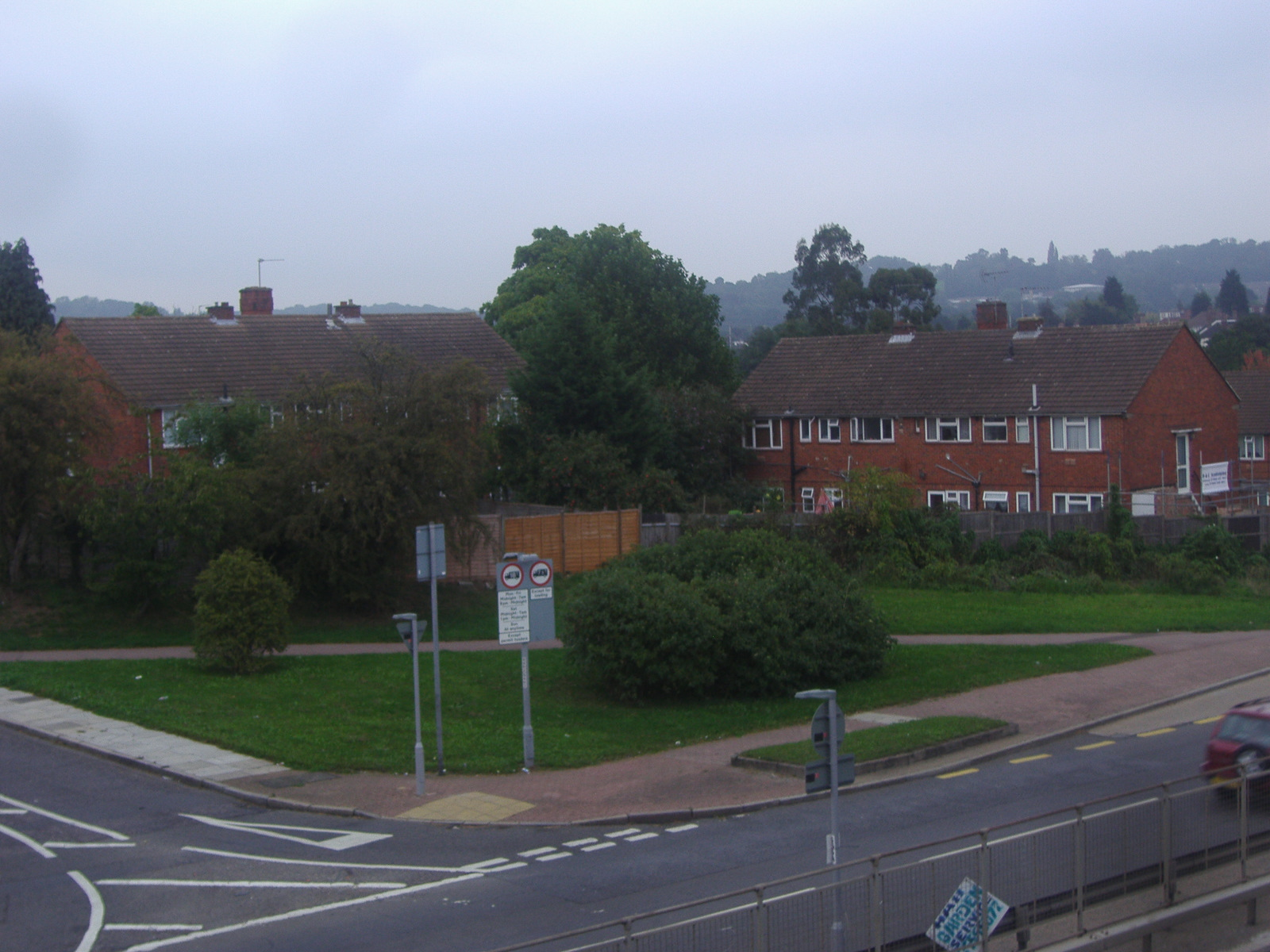
- A view of the Broadfields estate

- Location within Greater London
- London borough: Barnet
- Ceremonial county: Greater London
- Region: London
- Country: England
- Sovereign state: United Kingdom
- Post town: EDGWARE
- Postcode district: HA8
- Dialling code: 020
- Police: Metropolitan
- Fire: London
- Ambulance: London
- London Assembly: Barnet and Camden

Broadfields or the Broadfields Estate is a neighbourhood of Edgware in the London Borough of Barnet in northwest London, UK.

== History and geography ==
Broadfields occupies the northwestern corner of Edgware and the wider London Borough of Barnet. It is located 10.5 miles (16 km) northwest of Charing Cross and the nearest London Underground station is Edgware tube station, located a short distance to the south. It is on the urban-rural boundary of the London suburban built-up area.

The area mostly consists of 1930s, 1960s and 1970s housing, started in small part in 1927 but mostly John Laing's Edgware houses with gardens built from 1936.

Ranging in elevation from 69 to 86 metres above sea level, Broadfields is west of the Midland Main Line immediately beyond which is the M1 motorway (these section off a small part of east Edgware and the higher Mill Hill suburb). Two small headwaters rise here, one of which is named the Dean's Brook.

Broadfields is north of the A41 road which is a long-distance feeder to the M1 and the main road to Bushey and Stanmore from central London. The area has two primary schools, a playground, and a sports ground. To the west is Edgwarebury Park, and to the north Edgwarebury and Bury farms, the former of which was not a manor but was documented as a notable farm in the customary taxation records (such as feet of fines) from 1216. These farms sold a similar area of land to their present size to enable the estate to be built.

It has a shopping parade including a chain grocery shop, Post Office and pharmacy.

Bus route 288 terminates at Broadfields.
