= Broad Sound (Maine) =

Coordinates: 43.73°N 70.07°W

Broad Sound is a passage north from Casco Bay through the islands northwest of Portland, Maine. It lies between Chebeague Island and Harpswell Neck.
