= Broad River =

Broad River may refer to several rivers:

Canada:

- Broad River (Manitoba), a tributary of Hudson Bay

Jamaica:

- Broad River (Jamaica)

United States:

- Broad River (Carolinas), a tributary of the Congaree River in North and South Carolina
- Broad River (Georgia)
- Broad River (South Carolina), on the Atlantic coast

== See also ==
- First Broad River
- French Broad River
- Second Broad River
- Broad Creek (disambiguation)
