= Broadfield, Pembrokeshire =

Village in Pembrokeshire, Wales

Coordinates: 51.69°N 04.70°W

Broadfield
- Location within Pembrokeshire
- OS grid reference: SN1303
- Principal area: Pembrokeshire
- Country: Wales
- Sovereign state: United Kingdom
- Police: Dyfed-Powys
- Fire: Mid and West Wales
- Ambulance: Welsh

Broadfield is a small village south of Saundersfoot in the parish and community of St Mary Out Liberty in Pembrokeshire, Wales.

== Location ==
Broadfield lies within the Pembrokeshire Coast National Park and close to the Pembrokeshire Coast Path. The A478 road to Tenby passes to the west of the village, and the B4316 road runs through it. A major amenity is Broadfield Caravan Park, accommodating summer visitors to the resorts of Saundersfoot to the north and Tenby to the south.

== History ==
Broadfield was an isolated rural agricultural area in the 19th and early 20th centuries. Broadfield Cottage is shown on a 1841 map, and the Royal Commission recorded Broadfield Cottage and Homestead (subsequently Broadfield Farm). A pre-1850 parish map of St Mary out Liberty shows Broadfield in the north east of the parish. Even a 1906 map shows very few buildings.

== Chapel ==
Bethesda Calvinistic Methodist Chapel was built on Sandy Lane (on the A478) in 1826. It was rebuilt in 1864 and again 30 years later.
