= Broad Avenue =

Street and arts district in Memphis, Tennessee

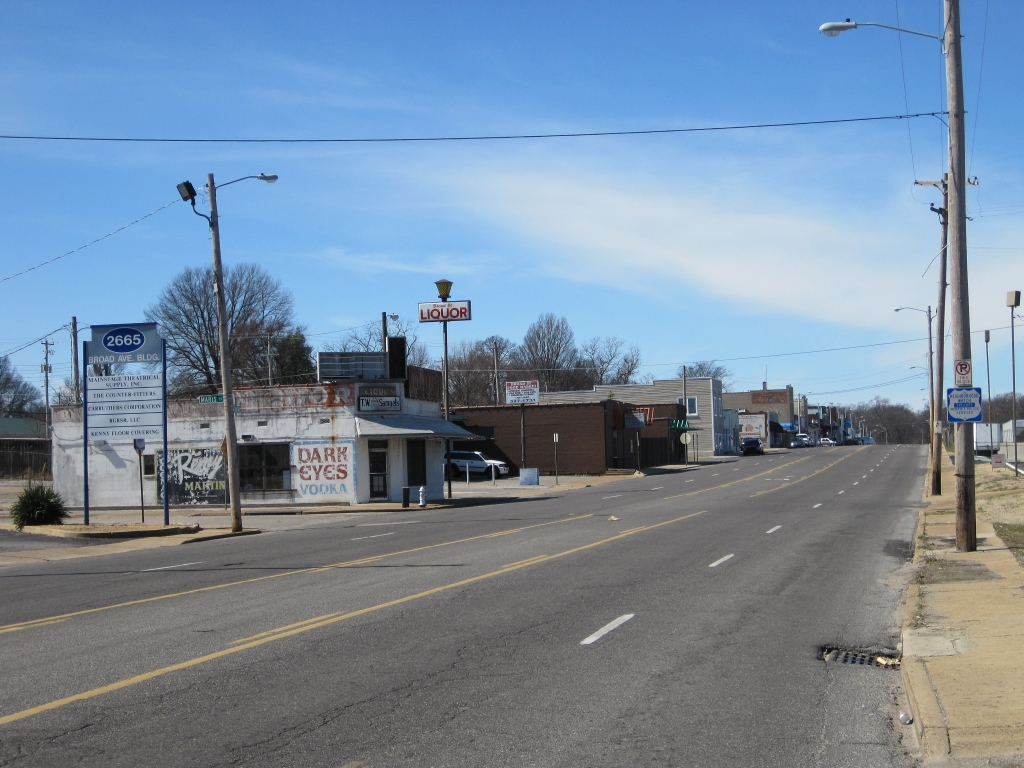
Broad Avenue in 2010

Broad Avenue is a street and arts district in Memphis, Tennessee, known for its transformation from a collection of vacant storefronts to a vibrant arts district in less than a decade.

== History ==
Broad Avenue was originally the main street of Binghampton, a small railroad town chartered in 1895. In 1919, the city was annexed by Memphis, and Broad Avenue gradually fell into disrepair. In the mid-2000s, various efforts were organized to bring the street back into use. From 2007 to 2012, the street became a vibrant arts district as local businesses began to occupy the then-vacant storefronts. For example, in 2010 a two-day "demonstration" was arranged in which the still vacant storefronts along Broad were temporarily filled with local vendors and stores in order to show what the street had the potential to become.

== Arts ==
In May 2011, French artist Guillaume Alby painted a large 1,800-square-foot geometrically styled mural on the 2500 block of Broad Avenue. A series of other art projects followed. These included another mural on a warehouse wall facing the street and the lighting-up of the iconic watertower which identifies Broad Avenue, among many others.

It is also home to a bi-annual art walk, in which local artists display their wares along the street. The event is accompanied by free music and food from local restaurants and bakeries.

== Cycling ==
Broad Avenue is currently the home of the Memphis Greenline (cycling path) headquarters, and was used as an early demonstration of proposed bike lanes for the city of Memphis. The demonstration, which proved to be a success (resulting in the permanent addition of bike lanes) was arranged by Livable Memphis. In June 2011, it was proposed as a connector for cyclists between Overton Park and Shelby Farms Park, two key locations in Memphis.
