= Typhoon Dan (1999) =

Pacific typhoon in 1999

Typhoon Dan (Pepang)
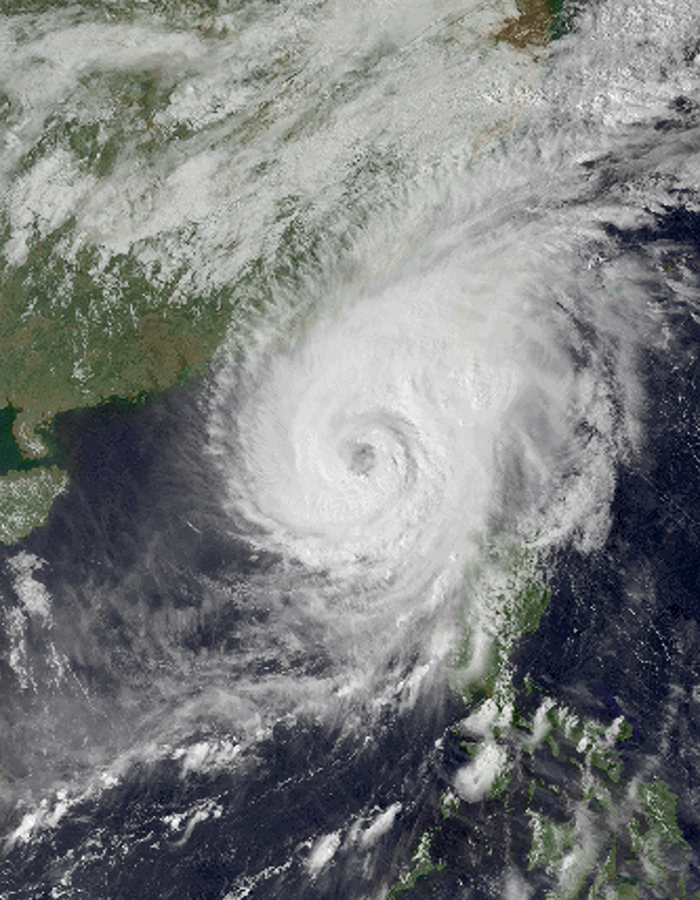
- Typhoon Dan at peak intensity on October 7

Meteorological history
- Formed: October 2, 1999
- Dissipated: October 10, 1999

Typhoon
- 10-minute sustained (JMA)
- Highest winds: 150 km/h (90 mph)
- Lowest pressure: 955 hPa (mbar); 28.20 inHg

Category 3-equivalent typhoon
- 1-minute sustained (SSHWS/JTWC)
- Highest winds: 205 km/h (125 mph)
- Lowest pressure: 955 hPa (mbar); 28.20 inHg

Overall effects
- Fatalities: 44 total
- Damage: $242 million (1999 USD)
- Areas affected: Philippines; Taiwan; China; South Korea
- IBTrACS
- Part of the 1999 Pacific typhoon season

Typhoon Dan, known in the Philippines as Typhoon Pepang, was a tropical cyclone that affected multiple areas in the Western Pacific Ocean. As the twenty-third tropical storm and the fifth typhoon of the 1999 Pacific typhoon season, it originated from a tropical depression in the Philippine Sea. The depression strengthened to a tropical storm two days later, attaining the name Dan.

Heavy rainfall and major flooding hit the Philippines, China, and Taiwan. 44 people died, and around $432.8 million (2022 USD) in damage was caused due to Dan.

== Meteorological history ==
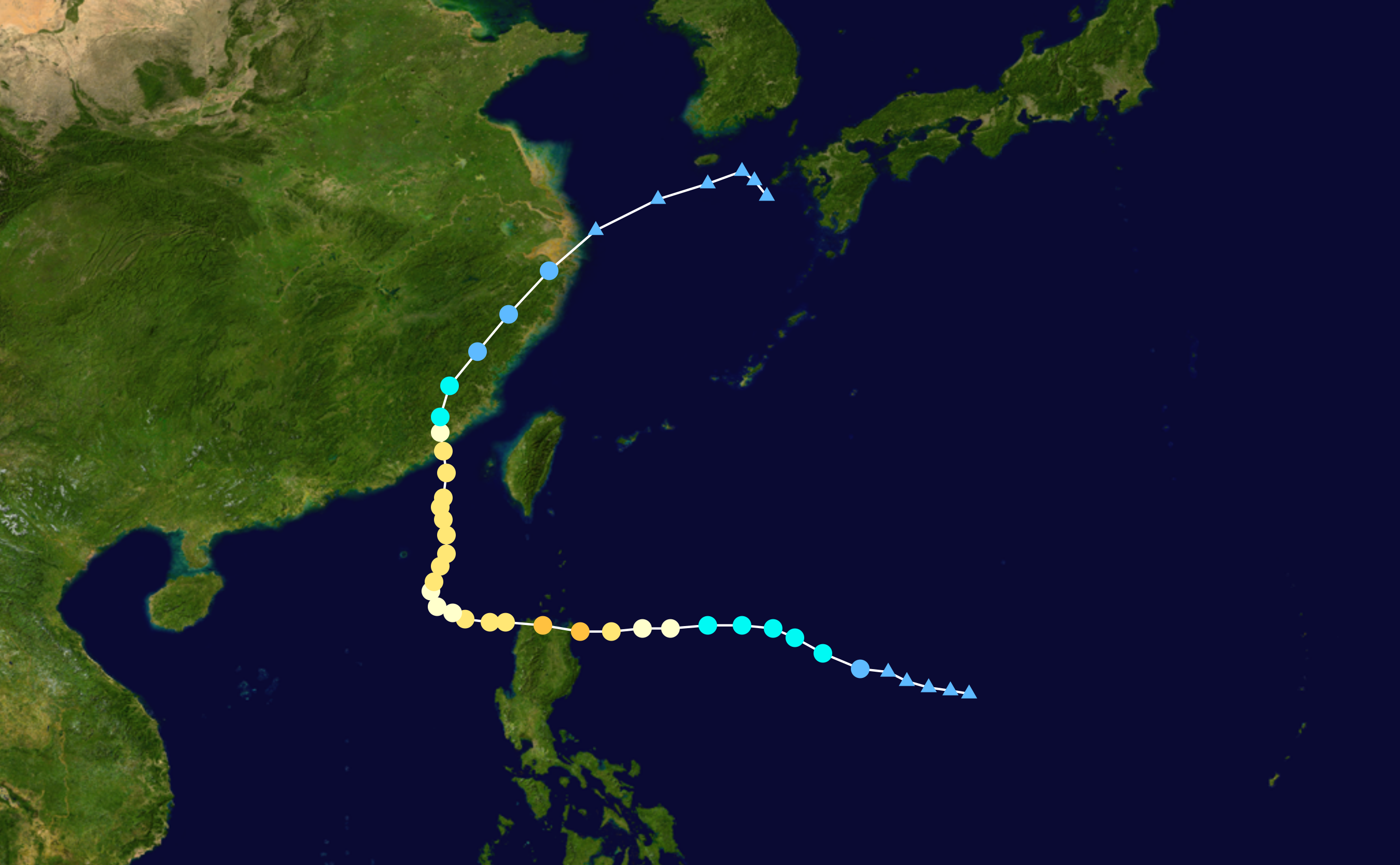
Map plotting the storm's track and intensity, according to the Saffir–Simpson scale Map key Saffir–Simpson scale Tropical depression (≤38 mph, ≤62 km/h) Tropical storm (39–73 mph, 63–118 km/h) Category 1 (74–95 mph, 119–153 km/h) Category 2 (96–110 mph, 154–177 km/h) Category 3 (111–129 mph, 178–208 km/h) Category 4 (130–156 mph, 209–251 km/h) Category 5 (≥157 mph, ≥252 km/h) Unknown Storm type Tropical cyclone Subtropical cyclone Extratropical cyclone, remnant low, tropical disturbance, or monsoon depression

An area of low pressure, would be upgraded to a tropical depression, designated as 26W, developed over the Philippine Sea on October 1 about 750 km (470 mi) to the east of Luzon. The PAGASA designated the system Pepang. The system intensified as it moved west-northwest, making the system gain the name Dan on October 3. Dan would strengthen to a typhoon status the next day. Typhoon Dan reached its peak with winds of 205 kilometres per hour (125 mph) early on October 5 and hit northern Luzon at that strength. The typhoon weakened as it entered the South China Sea, but re-intensified as it turned towards the north. Typhoon Dan made its second landfall near Xiamen, China on October 9 and weakened overland. Dan turned to the northeast and weakened to a tropical depression before it moved over the Yellow Sea late on October 10, later getting absorbed by a frontal system over the Yellow Sea early the next day.

== Preparations and impact ==
=== China ===
Thirty-four died and 1,400 people were injured as a result of the storm in Fujian. 1,500 houses were destroyed and $240 million of damage occurred in the province. Dan was the worst typhoon to hit Xiamen in 46 years, killing five and injuring over 100 in the city. In Zhangzhou, collapsing buildings resulted in seven deaths. Eighteen people were killed nearby in Quanzhou. Dan caused more damage on top of an earthquake that had occurred not long before Dan's landfall.

=== Philippines ===
Many families were affected by Typhoon Dan, with the most affected areas being crisscrossed areas and mountainous areas. Rains caused rivers to overflow, washing away homes and rice fields. The disaster got worse when the storm hit Cagayan and five other provinces, with a total of 37,200 people affected by the disaster. 4,330 families were affected in Cagayan, ranging from a total of 58 barangays. Pangasinan also had 1,865 affected families. These affected families were placed in shelters to protect them from the storm. Typhoon Dan brought torrential rain of up to 500 mm (20 in), affected 2,600 homes and killed at least five people. Hundreds of houses were damaged in Northern Luzon. There was more than $2 million of damage to agriculture in the Philippines.

=== Taiwan ===
Typhoon Dan brought torrential rain of up to 500 mm (20 in) to southern Taiwan. Southern Taiwan was still recovering from the Jiji earthquake of the previous month, and Dan delayed the recovery efforts. The typhoon burst a dike in Kaohsiung and another in Tainan, that had been damaged by the earthquake. Dan knocked down a large number of trees on Kinmen, which led to the disruption of 70% of the island's power supply. Several fishing boats were sunk and houses were damaged on Penghu. Over 850 areas of Taiwan were put under a landslide warning.

== Aftermath ==
After the storm, the Philippine Red Cross distributed 50 kilograms (110 lb) of rice for each of the families and one kilogram of dried fish and salt. These stocks were prepared by the Spanish Red Cross.

== See also ==
- Tropical cyclones in 1999
- Typhoon Nora (1973) – the second most intense category 5 typhoon by barometric pressure, which affected similar areas.
- Typhoon Thelma (1977) – took a similar track.
- Typhoon Clara (1981) – a category 4 typhoon that affected the Philippines, China, South Korea, and Japan.
- Typhoon Hal (1985) – affected Northern Luzon as a category 3 typhoon and made landfall in China.
- Typhoon Percy (1990) – a category 4 typhoon affected similar areas.
- Typhoon Nuri (2008) – a category 3 typhoon that took a similar track.
- Tropical Storm Linfa (2009) – took a nearly identical track.
- Typhoon Megi (2010) – a category 5 typhoon that took a comparable track.
- Typhoon Haima (2016) – a very intense typhoon that made landfall in Luzon and China.
- Typhoon Doksuri (2023) – a Category 4 typhoon that also caused widespread damage in Luzon and China.
