= Cyclone John =

Category 5 Australian region cyclone in 1999

Severe Tropical Cyclone John
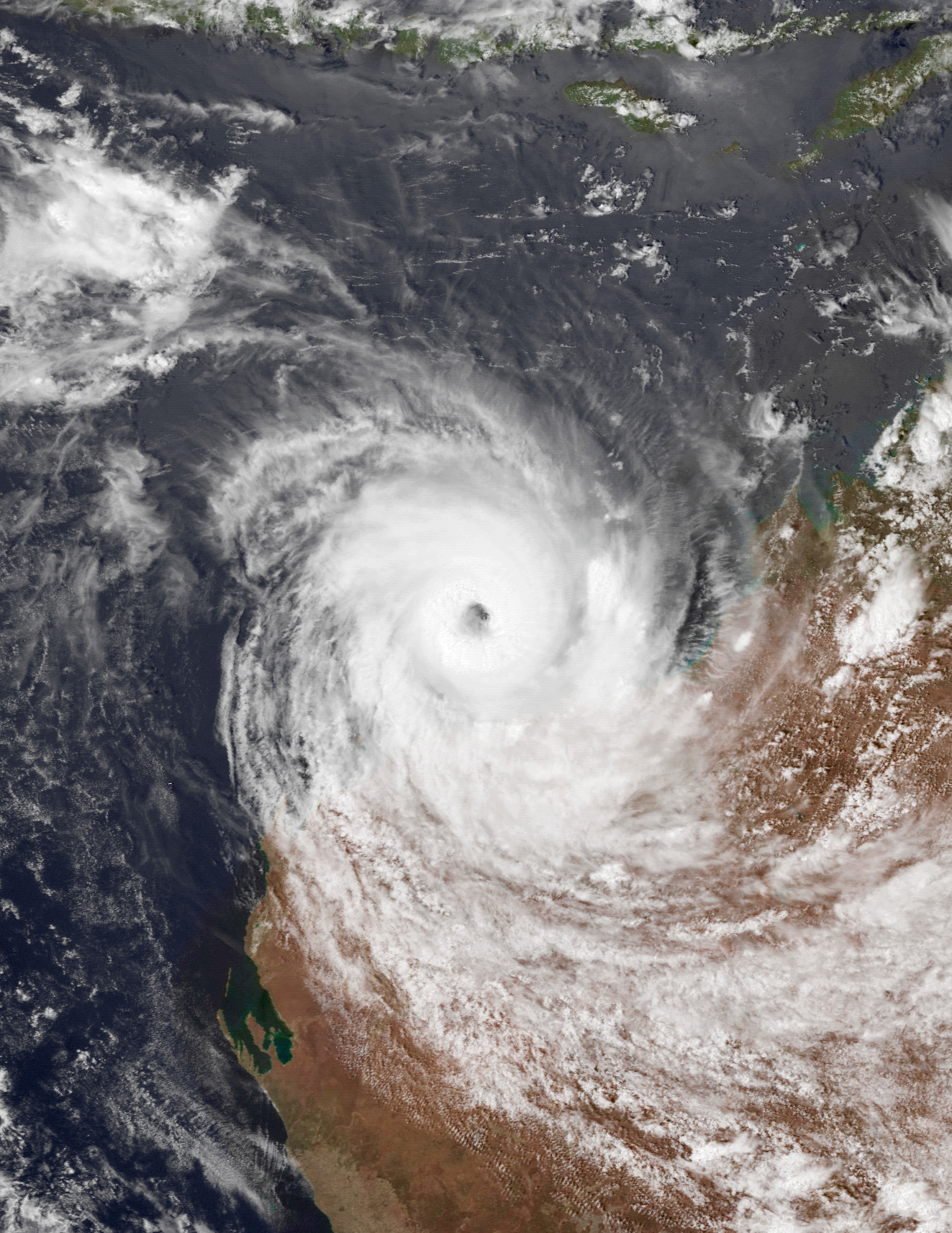
- John near its peak intensity on 14 December

Meteorological history
- Formed: 9 December 1999
- Dissipated: 16 December 1999

Category 5 severe tropical cyclone
- 10-minute sustained (Aus)
- Highest winds: 205 km/h (125 mph)
- Lowest pressure: 915 hPa (mbar); 27.02 inHg

Category 4-equivalent tropical cyclone
- 1-minute sustained (SSHWS/JTWC)
- Highest winds: 240 km/h (150 mph)
- Lowest pressure: 910 hPa (mbar); 26.87 inHg

Overall effects
- Fatalities: None
- Damage: Unknown
- Areas affected: Western Australia
- IBTrACS
- Part of the 1999–2000 Australian region cyclone season

Severe Tropical Cyclone John was an intense tropical cyclone that rapidly deepened offshore before devastating areas of Western Australia. The system was the second cyclone and first severe tropical cyclone of the active 1999–2000 Australian region cyclone season. Cyclone John developed from a monsoon trough positioned northwest of Australia on 9 December 1999. As it moved to the west and later south as the result of a subtropical ridge under favourable conditions, the cyclone was able to rapidly intensify. John reached peak intensity on 14 December as a Category 5 cyclone on the Australian cyclone scale, the highest rating possible. Cyclone John later began interacting with a mid–latitude trough, which slightly weakened the cyclone prior to making landfall near Whim Creek early on 15 December. Increasingly unfavourable conditions further inland resulted in the cyclone's rapid weakening, before it dissipated during the next day.

Cyclone John extensively affected areas of Western Australia, but damage was not as bad as expected. Widespread power outages across the Pilbara region were caused by John. Strong winds caused minor damage to infrastructure across the coast, as well as tree damage. 140 windmills were destroyed by the cyclone on the coast. Further inland, rainfall associated with the cyclone and its remnants brought flooding, which flooded 25 houses and caused rivers to overflow. The system was responsible for no deaths and a limited amount of damage. After the season, the name John was retired from the Australian tropical cyclone naming list.

== Meteorological history ==
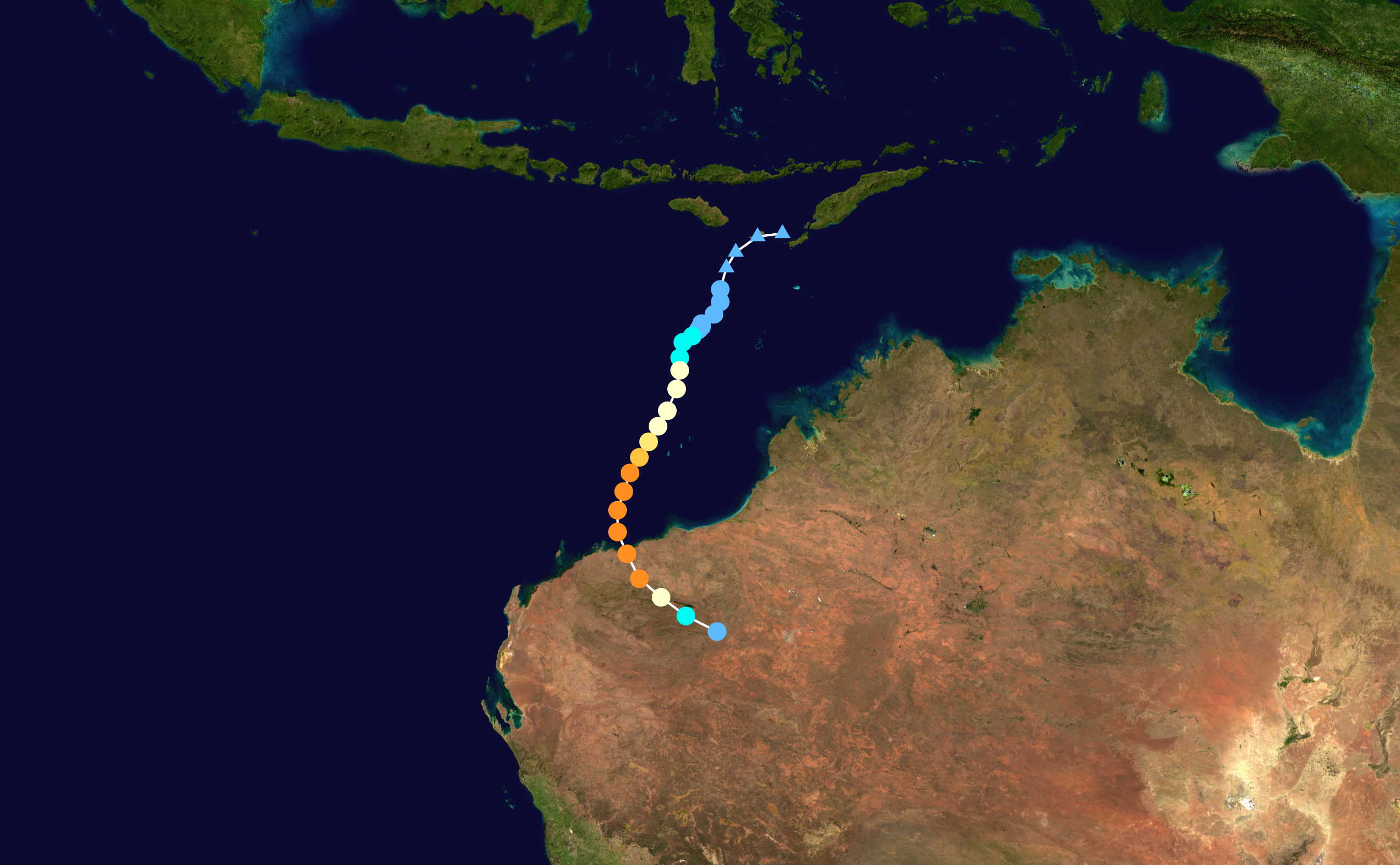
Map plotting the storm's track and intensity, according to the Saffir–Simpson scale Map key Saffir–Simpson scale Tropical depression (≤38 mph, ≤62 km/h) Tropical storm (39–73 mph, 63–118 km/h) Category 1 (74–95 mph, 119–153 km/h) Category 2 (96–110 mph, 154–177 km/h) Category 3 (111–129 mph, 178–208 km/h) Category 4 (130–156 mph, 209–251 km/h) Category 5 (≥157 mph, ≥252 km/h) Unknown Storm type Tropical cyclone Subtropical cyclone Extratropical cyclone, remnant low, tropical disturbance, or monsoon depression

In early December, a monsoon trough north of Australia intensified due to a strong northwest cross–equatorial surge in the South China Sea. This resulted in the formation of a tropical low southwest of Timor on 9 December. At 0600 UTC on 10 December, the Joint Typhoon Warning Center (JTWC) began to monitor the system, designating it as 02S. As it moved towards the west and subsequently southwards, improving upper–air divergence allowed the system to intensify, reaching tropical cyclone intensity on the evening of 11 December and thus attaining the name John. At the time, a Tropical Rainfall Measuring Mission (TRMM) pass of the system revealed a compact system, with a convective rainband tightly surrounding a central cloud–filled eye. A developed anticyclone positioned over the system provided favorable conditions for development. Due to the presence of a subtropical ridge to the east over Australia, Cyclone John was forecast to generally move in a south-southwestward direction.

Steadily intensifying, the cyclone attained Category 3 cyclone intensity on the Australian cyclone scale at 1600 UTC on 12 December. TRMM imagery indicated that the cyclone had developed a banding eye feature, and had good outflow and a symmetric structure. Cyclone John continued to intensify under favorable atmospheric conditions, before reaching its peak intensity as a Category 5 cyclone on the Australian cyclone scale at 0800 UTC on 14 December, while located 170 km (105 mi) northwest of Port Hedland, Western Australia. At peak intensity, the storm had maximum 10–minute sustained wind speeds of 205 km/h (130 mph) and a minimum barometric pressure of 915 mbar (27.0 inHg).

However, after peak intensity, dry air began to become wrapped into the northwestern quadrant of the system. Moving towards the Australian coastline, radar imagery from Dampier, Western Australia showed a strong eyewall associated with John. Cyclone John began to become elongated along a northwest–southeast axis as it neared the coast. The cyclone also began interacting with a mid–latitude trough to the southwest. This generated some vertical wind shear, which weakened John slightly and caused it to curve towards the southeast. Cyclone John made landfall near Whim Creek, Western Australia at 0030 UTC on 15 December with a minimum central pressure between 930 and 940 mbar (27.46–27.46 inHg), and around 30 minutes later had maximum 10–minute sustained winds of 85 knots (155 km/h; 100 mph). The entirety of the cyclone's eye crossed the coast by 0200 UTC as the storm moved further inland into an area of wind shear and dry air, which caused it to rapidly weaken. The cyclone was last noted by TCWC Perth and the JTWC on 16 December as it dissipated overland.

== Preparations and impact ==
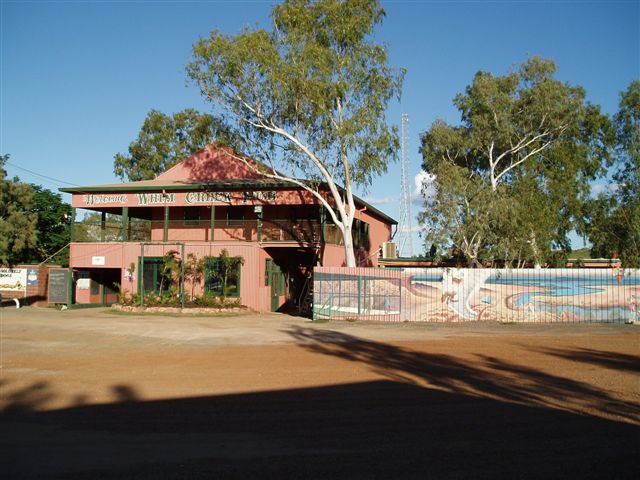
The Whim Creek pub in 2008, which was damaged by Cyclone John

Prior to Cyclone John's landfall, hundreds of people were evacuated from homes, primarily in Karratha, where two shelters were set up. In Point Samson, 500 people evacuated to shelters in Wickham, Western Australia. TCWC Perth began issuing hourly warnings for potentially affected areas beginning at 1400 UTC on 14 December. As the storm made landfall, some residents of Whim Creek took refuge in a shipping container.

Strong winds from the cyclone caused widespread power outages to areas in Pilbara. At Cape Lambert, winds averaged 150 km/h (95 mph) for five hours, with a peak wind gust of 210 km/h (130 mph). Karratha suffered minor damage from John, primarily in the form of wind damage. Various trees were uprooted by strong winds, and some homes suffered minor roof damage. Palm fronds in Karratha were blown off palm trees due to strong winds. In Whim Creek, where the cyclone had made landfall, the top floor of a 113-year-old pub and hotel was destroyed. A temporary roof made up of tarpaulins later collapsed in a flood event the following month. 140 windmills between Whim Creek and Newman were destroyed by the cyclone.

Offshore, 220 cattle aboard a ship died after the ship was battered by rough seas associated with Cyclone John. Production from an oil field off the coast of northwest Australia were down 38%, partly due to being shut down in preparation for Cyclone John. Rough seas from John also caused a maximum storm surge height of 2 m (6.6 ft), recorded in Port Hedland by the Port Hedland Authority on 15 December. Further inland, Cyclone John brought widespread rainfall and flooding. In Newman, Western Australia, 240 mm (9.4 in) of rain was recorded early on 16 December. As a result, some roads and 25 houses were flooded by the rains. By the evening of that day, the rainfall total had increased to 500 mm (20 in). Todd River was flooded after 80 mm (3.1 in) of rain fell as a result of the cyclone. Overall John was responsible for no deaths and a limited amount of damage. After the season had ended the name John was retired from the Australian tropical cyclone naming list.

== See also ==
- Tropical cyclones in 1999
- Cyclone Orson
- Cyclone Joan
- Cyclone George
- Cyclone Gwenda
