= Tropical cyclones in 1999 =

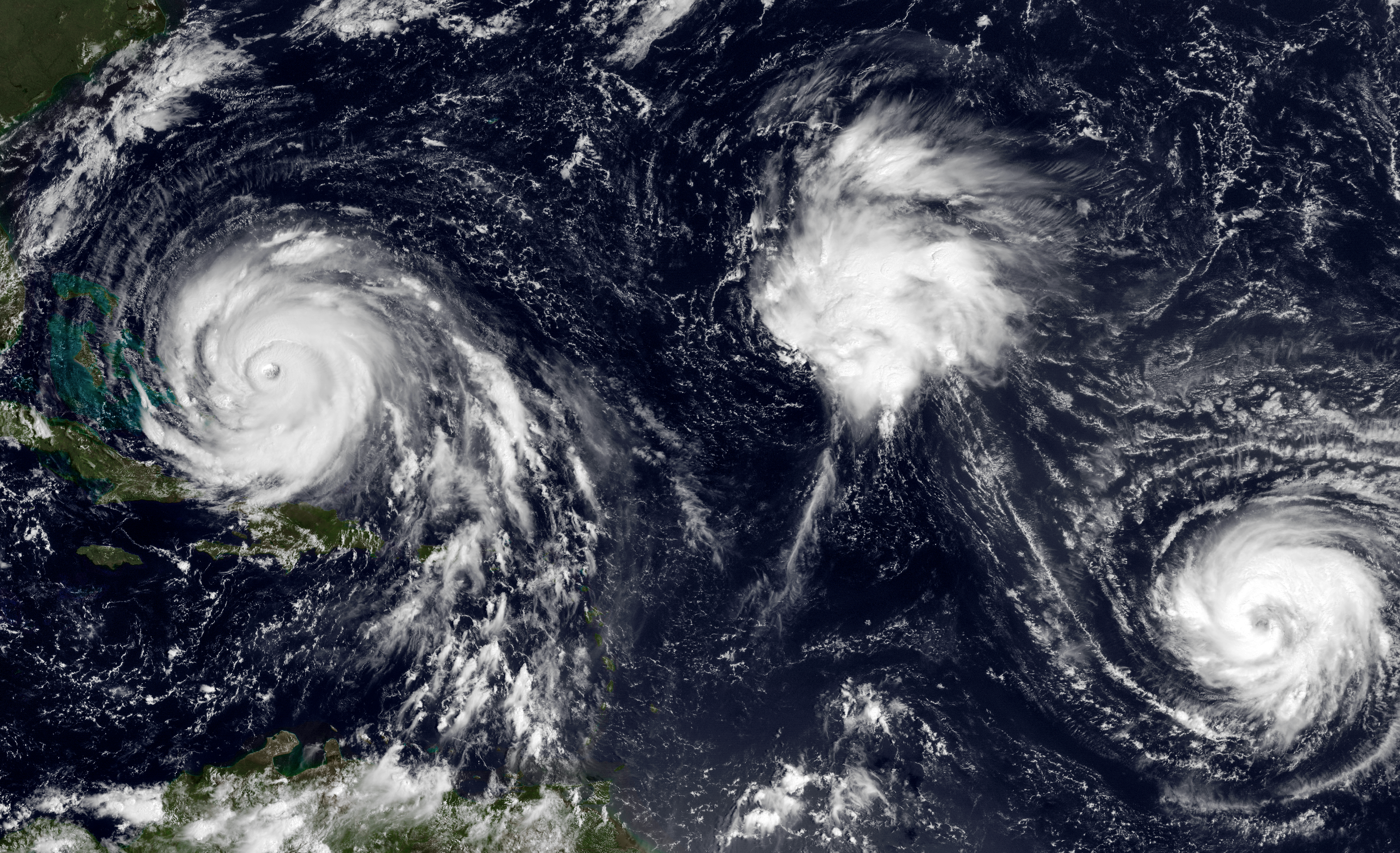
- Satellite image of two simultaneous tropical cyclones in the North Atlantic ocean on September 13, with Hurricane Floyd (left), a tropical disturbance, and Hurricane Gert

Year boundaries
- First system: 05F
- Formed: January 1, 1999
- Last system: Astride
- Dissipated: January 3, 2000

Strongest system
- Name: Gwenda
- Lowest pressure: 900 mbar (hPa); 26.58 inHg

Longest lasting system
- Name: Dora
- Duration: 17 days

Year statistics
- Total systems: 132
- Named systems: 65 (record low)
- Total fatalities: 19,081 total
- Total damage: $18.1 billion (1999 USD)
Related articles
- 1999 Atlantic hurricane season
- 1999 Pacific hurricane season
- 1999 Pacific typhoon season
- 1999 North Indian Ocean cyclone season
- 1998–99 South-West Indian Ocean cyclone season
- 1999–2000 South-West Indian Ocean cyclone season
- 1998–99 Australian region cyclone season
- 1999–2000 Australian region cyclone season
- 1998–99 South Pacific cyclone season
- 1999–2000 South Pacific cyclone season

During 1999, tropical cyclones formed in seven major bodies of water, commonly known as tropical cyclone basins. Tropical cyclones will be assigned names by various weather agencies if they attain maximum sustained winds of 35 knots (65 km/h; 40 mph). During the year, one hundred thirty-two systems have formed and a record-low a sixty-five were named. The strongest tropical cyclone of the year was Gwenda, attaining maximum sustained winds of 120 knots (220 km/h; 140 mph) and a pressure of 900 hPa (26.58 inHg), later tied with Inigo in 2003. The costliest tropical cyclone of the year was Floyd, with around $6.5 billion worth of damages as it affected the Bahamas, the East Coast of the United States, and Atlantic Canada, while the deadliest tropical cyclone of this year was a tropical cyclone in Odisha, which was blamed for over 9,667 deaths as it devastated India. Among this year's systems, twenty-one became major tropical cyclones, of which three intensified into Category 5 tropical cyclones on the Saffir–Simpson scale (SSHWS). The accumulated cyclone energy (ACE) index for the 1999 (seven basins combined), as calculated by Colorado State University (CSU) was 606.4 units, which was below the 1991–2020 mean of 770.2 units.

The most active basin in the year was the Western Pacific Ocean, which had 19 named systems, including one system that crossed from the Central Pacific. The North Atlantic Ocean had an above-average and destructive season, with 12 named storms forming; eight of those became hurricanes, and five Category 4 hurricanes – the highest number recorded in a single season in the Atlantic basin, previously tied in 1933 and 1961, and later tied in 2005 and 2020. The Eastern Pacific had a total of nine named storms; six of those became hurricanes. The North Indian Ocean was extremely active and deadly tropical cyclone season in recent times, with four named storms forming, producing the fifth-most accumulated cyclone energy in this basin on record. Activity across the Southern Hemisphere's three basins (South-West Indian, Australian, and South Pacific) was fairly significant, with the regions recording twenty-one named storms altogether, with the most intense Southern Hemisphere cyclones of the year, Cyclone Gwenda and Cyclone Vance in the Australian region, peaking with a central pressure of 912 hPa (26.93 inHg).

Tropical cyclones were primarily monitored by ten warning centers across the world, which are designated as a Regional Specialized Meteorological Center (RSMC) or a Tropical Cyclone Warning Center (TCWC) by the World Meteorological Organization (WMO). These ten centers are the National Hurricane Center (NHC) and the Central Pacific Hurricane Center (CPHC), Japan Meteorological Agency (JMA), Indian Meteorological Department (IMD), Météo-France (MFR), Indonesia's Meteorology, Climatology, and Geophysical Agency (BMKG), the Australian Bureau of Meteorology (BoM), Papua New Guinea's National Weather Service (PNGNWS), the Fiji Meteorological Service (FMS), and New Zealand's MetService. Unofficial, but still notable, warning centres include the Philippine Atmospheric, Geophysical and Astronomical Services Administration (PAGASA), the United States's Joint Typhoon Warning Center (JTWC), and the Brazilian Navy Hydrographic Center.

== Global atmospheric and hydrological conditions ==
A strong La Niña was present for the whole year, which made the Atlantic and North Pacific waters warmer than usual.

== Summary ==
=== North Atlantic Ocean ===
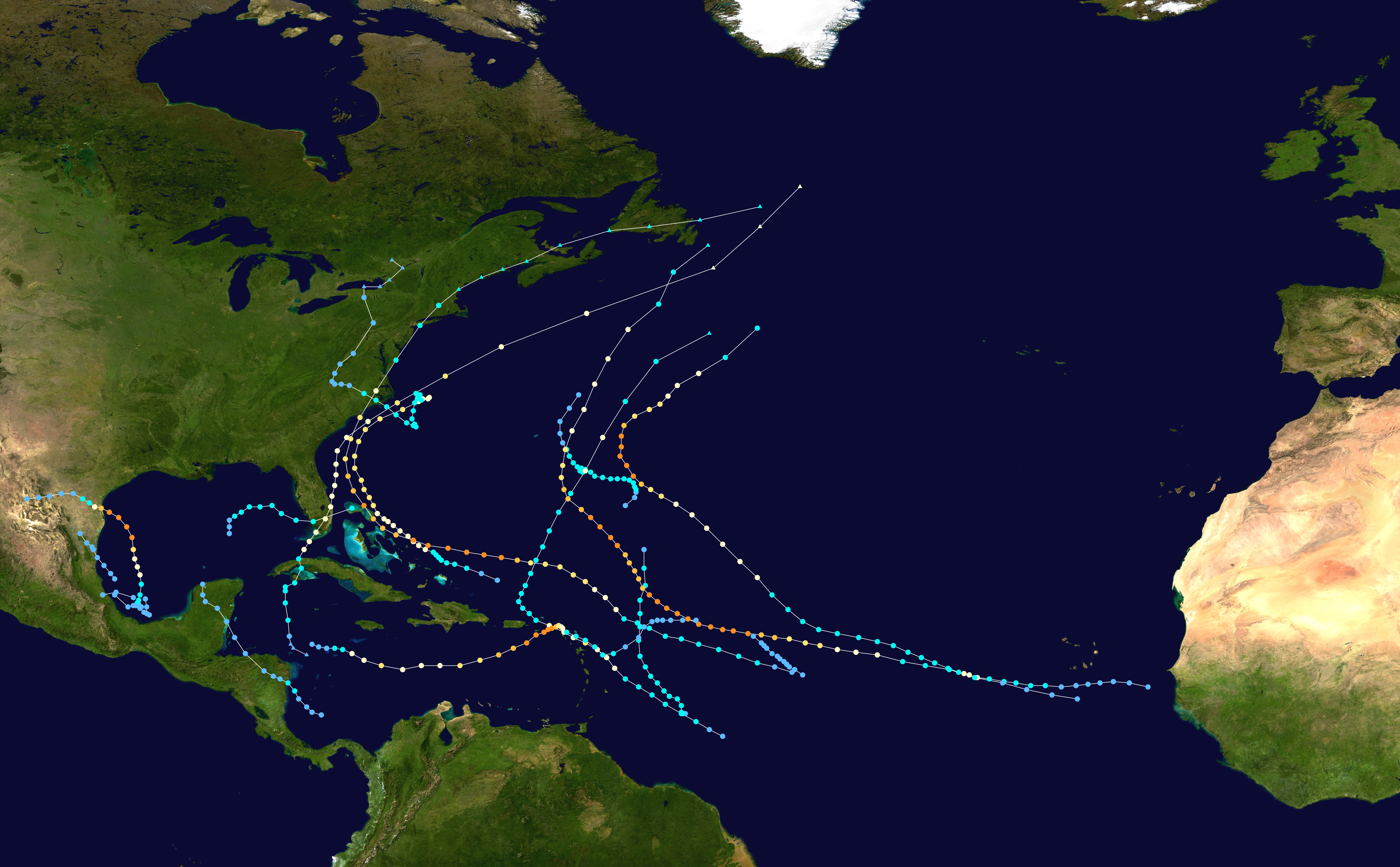
1999 Atlantic hurricane season summary map

The Atlantic hurricane season officially began on June 1, 1999, and the first tropical cyclone developed on June 11. It was an above–average season in which 16 tropical cyclones formed. Twelve depressions attained tropical storm status, and eight of these became hurricanes. Five hurricanes intensified further into major hurricanes. The season featured a record-tying five Category 4 hurricanes, later tied again in 2005 and 2020. These were Bret, Cindy, Floyd, Gert, and Hurricane Lenny. The last storm of the season, Hurricane Lenny, dissipated on November 23, which was about a week before the official season ending on November 30, 1999. A persistent La Niña that developed during the previous season was attributed to the above average activity. Between August and October, there was very low wind shear over the Caribbean Sea and western Atlantic Ocean, attributed to a combination of abnormal upper-level easterly winds and low-level westerly winds. Six hurricanes and two tropical storms made landfall during the season and caused at least 123 deaths and approximately $8.19 billion in damage. Hurricane Gert also caused damage and fatalities, despite not making landfall. Overall, the season's activity was reflected with a high cumulative accumulated cyclone energy (ACE) rating of 177.

The most significant storm of the season was Hurricane Floyd, a strong Category 4 hurricane that caused devastating flooding along the East Coast of the United States, especially in North Carolina. Damage from the storm totaled approximately $6.5 billion (1999 USD) (Note: All damage figures are in 1999 USD, unless otherwise noted) and there were at least 77 fatalities, making it the deadliest hurricane in the United States since Hurricane Agnes in 1972. Flooding from Floyd in North Carolina followed Hurricane Dennis, a slow and erratic–moving storm that dropped heavy rainfall in the eastern portion of the state. Tropical Depression Eleven in October contributed to extreme flooding in Mexico, which left 636 people dead and caused $491.3 million in damage, though impact could not be distinguished from the storm itself. Hurricane Irene caused extensive flooding in Cuba and Florida, with lesser effects in the Bahamas and North Carolina. Irene was the second–costliest storm of the season, with about $800 million in damage. Hurricane Lenny was an unusual eastward–moving storm in the Caribbean Sea and a strong late–season storm. It caused extensive damage in the Lesser Antilles in the month of November.

=== Eastern and Central Pacific Ocean ===
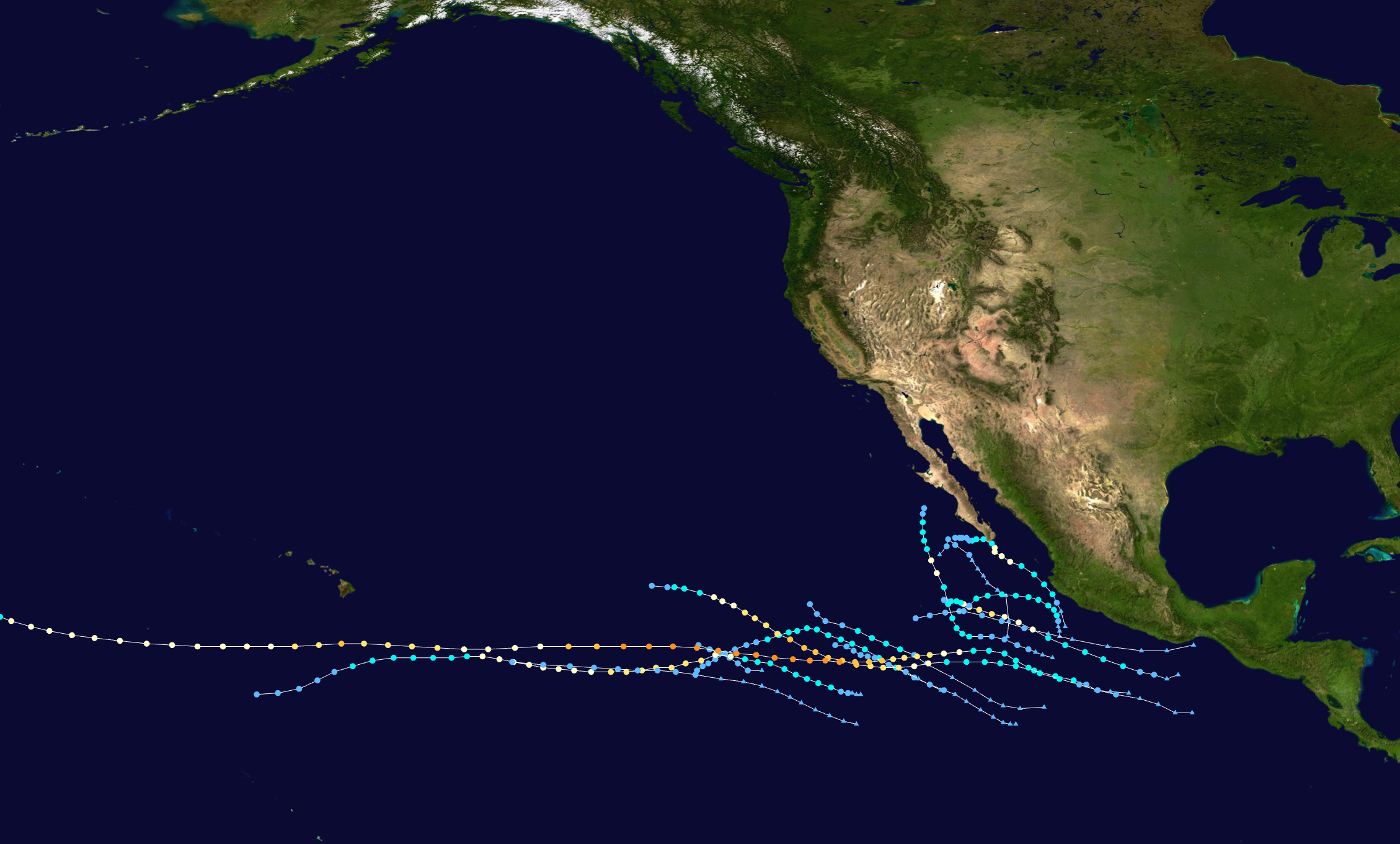
1999 Pacific hurricane season summary map

The 1999 Pacific hurricane season officially started on May 15, 1999 in the eastern Pacific, and on June 1, 1999, in the central Pacific, and lasted until November 30, 1999. These dates conventionally delimit the period of each year when most tropical cyclones form in the northeastern Pacific Ocean. The 1999 Pacific hurricane season was well below average, due to the strong La Niña that was occurring at the time, which causes wind shear to be increased and water temperatures to decrease, resulting in conditions less conductive for tropical cyclones in the East Pacific. There were 14 cyclones in total, including 5 unnamed tropical depressions. Of these, 9 became a tropical storm, while 6 reached hurricane status. Further, 2 of these became major hurricanes, which is Category 3 intensity or higher on the Saffir-Simpson hurricane scale.

Tropical cyclogenesis began with Hurricane Adrian, which developed on June 18. Although it remained offshore, Adrian brought rough surf and flooding to Mexico, which resulted in 6 fatalities. The storm peaked as a Category 2 before dissipating on June 22. No other tropical cyclones formed in June. Activity halted until July 9, when Hurricane Beatriz developed. Though it peaked as a Category 3 hurricane before dissipating on July 17, the storm caused no damage on land because it remained well offshore. The next system, a short-lived Tropical Depression Three-E, did not result in impact as a tropical cyclone, though the precursor brought heavy rainfall and gusty winds to Central America. Tropical Depression Four-E, was the first of three cyclones to cross into the Central Pacific Hurricane Center's area of responsibility, which is between 140°W and the International Date Line. Two other short-lived system in July, Tropical Storm Calvin and Tropical Depression Six-E, caused no damage. In August, Hurricane Dora, the strongest storm of the 1999 Pacific hurricane season, produced gusty winds and large waves on Johnston Atoll and the island of Hawaii, though minimal damage was left in its wake. After crossing the International Date Line on August 20, Dora became the first tropical cyclones to exist in all three basins of the North Pacific – Eastern, Central, and Western – since Hurricane John in 1994. Hurricane Eugene also existed in the Eastern and Central Pacific, but dissipated on August 15 while south of the main Hawaiian Islands, well before reaching the International Date Line. Nonetheless, it produced up to 2 inches (51 mm) of rainfall on the Big Island of Hawaii. In the remainder of August, there was a series of short-lived tropical cyclones that did not effect land, including Tropical Depression Nine-E, Tropical Storm Fernanda, and Tropical Depression Eleven-E.

During the month of September, the deadliest tropical cyclone of the season, Hurricane Greg, was spawned near the Pacific coast of Mexico. Greg which killed 10 people when it made landfall on southern Baja California. The hurricane and its precursor produced heavy rainfall across much of Mexico, with the highest total reaching 22.23 in (565 mm). The heavy rains damaged or destroyed more than 2,000 homes. The remnant moisture from the system, combined with an area of low pressure, resulted in strong thunderstorms across California, which led to numerous power outages, damage to homes and vehicles, and started many wildfires. The other in the month of September was Hurricane Hilary, a storm that approached Baja California, but dissipated offshore on September 21, resulting in no impact. The final system, Tropical Storm Irwin, produced scattered areas of heavy rainfall over Mexico in October, but caused no significant flooding. It dissipated on October 11, over a month and a half before the official end of the season on November 30. In addition to the systems observed by the CPHC and NHC, a tropical depression formed east of the International Dateline on August 19, and quickly exited CPHC's area of responsibility; however, this storm was not included into CPHC database.

=== Western Pacific Ocean ===
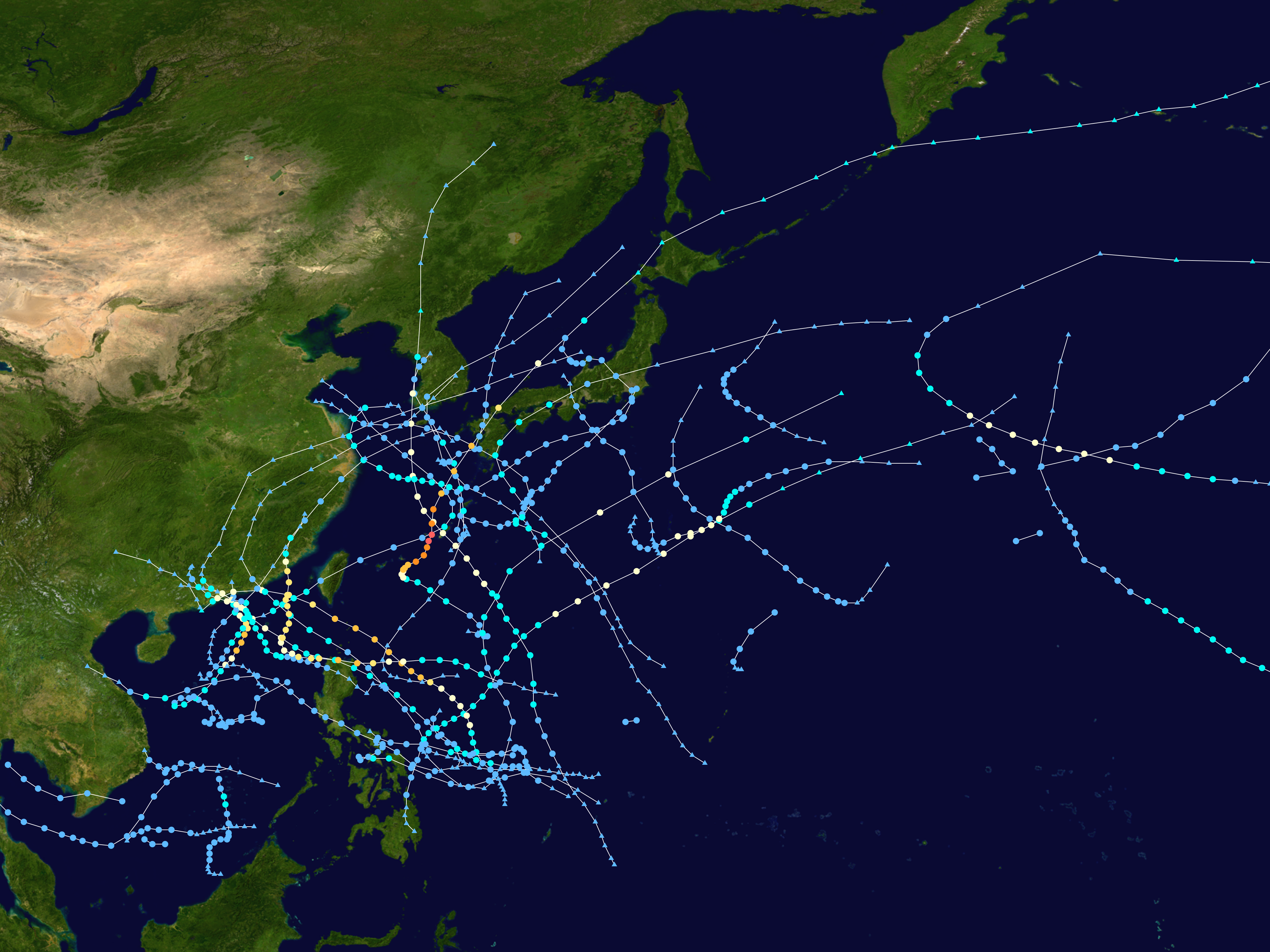
1999 Pacific typhoon season summary map

It was the last Pacific typhoon season to use English names as storm names. It also featured the lowest number of typhoons on record, with only five reaching this intensity. This was mainly due to a strong La Niña which persisted from last year. It also featured the least amount of ACE produced on record. The season was also below-average in named storms, with only 20 of such spawning. This season also featured multiple landfalls in Hong Kong, but it was much more active than the previous season. The first named storm, Hilda, developed on January 6, while the last named storm, Gloria, dissipated on November 16.

=== North Indian Ocean ===
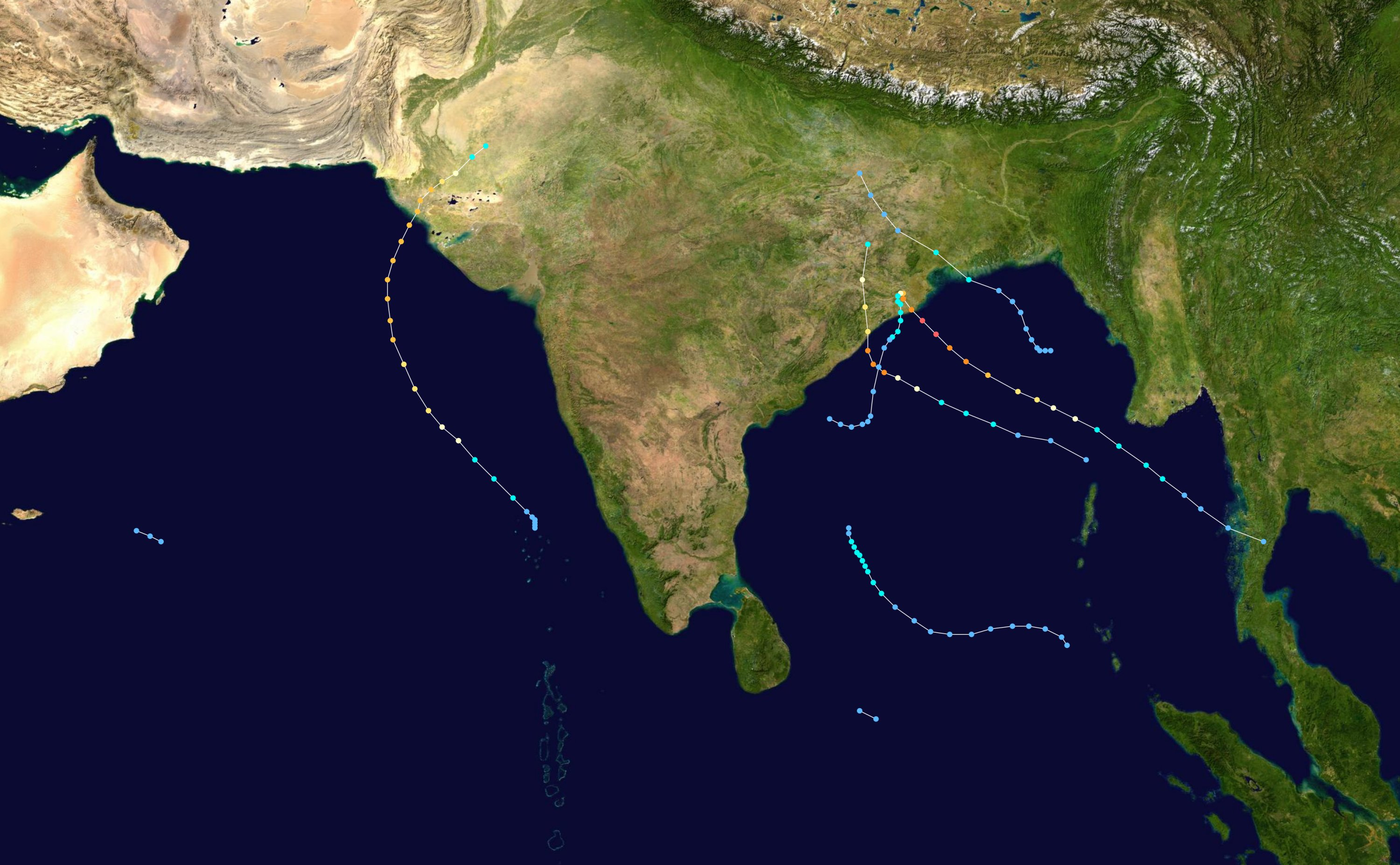
1999 North Indian Ocean cyclone season summary map

It was an extremely active and deadly tropical cyclone season in recent times. The season produced an above-average number of cyclonic storms but there was a very above-average number of intense cyclones. In May, a Category 3 cyclone struck Pakistan, leaving 6,400 people dead. In October, two very intense cyclones struck eastern India within two weeks of each other with the latter becoming the most intense Northern Indian Ocean cyclone on record, leaving over 10,000 people dead and causing more than $5.4 billion (1999 USD) in damages.

=== South-West Indian Ocean ===
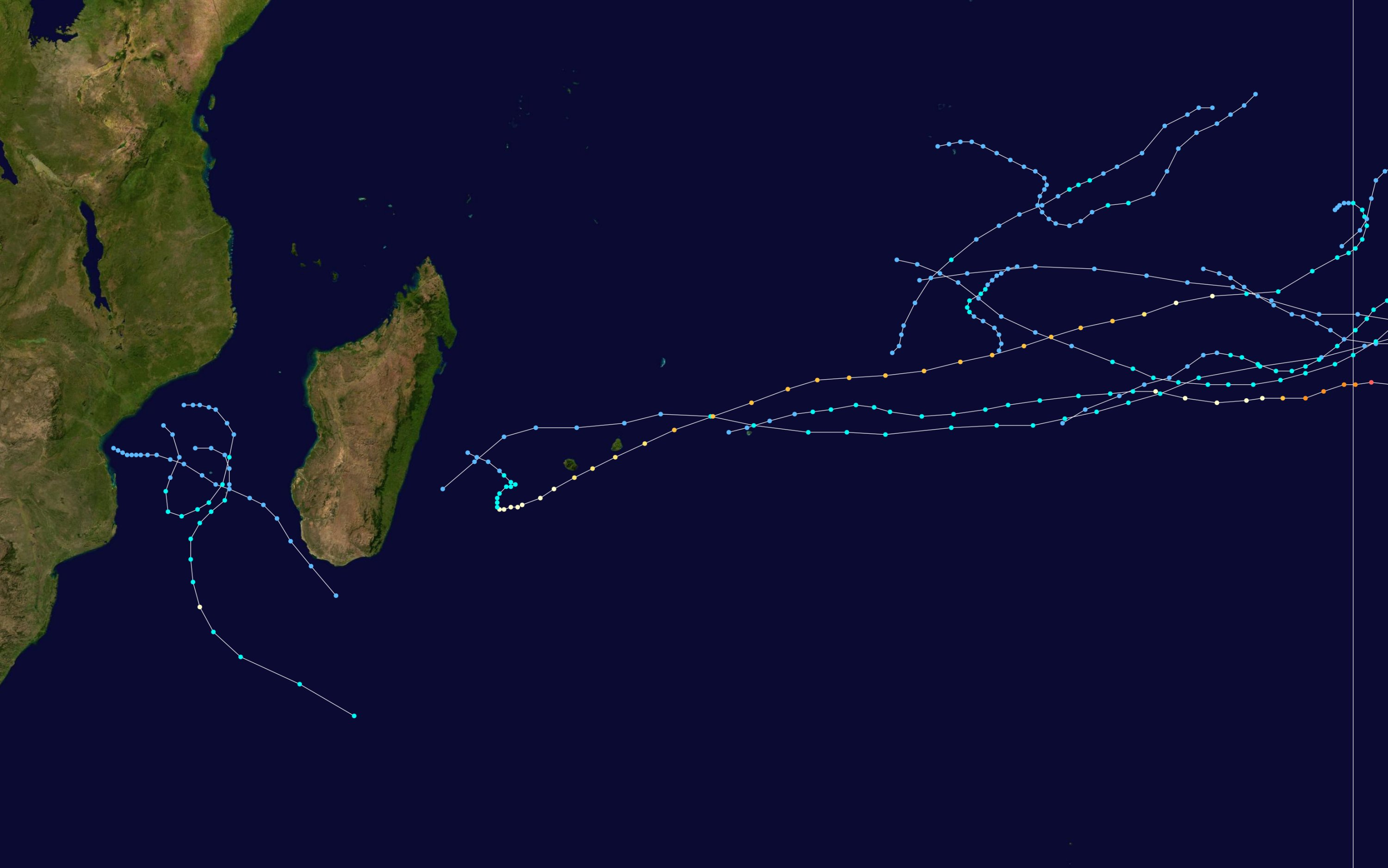
1998–99 South-West Indian Ocean cyclone season summary map

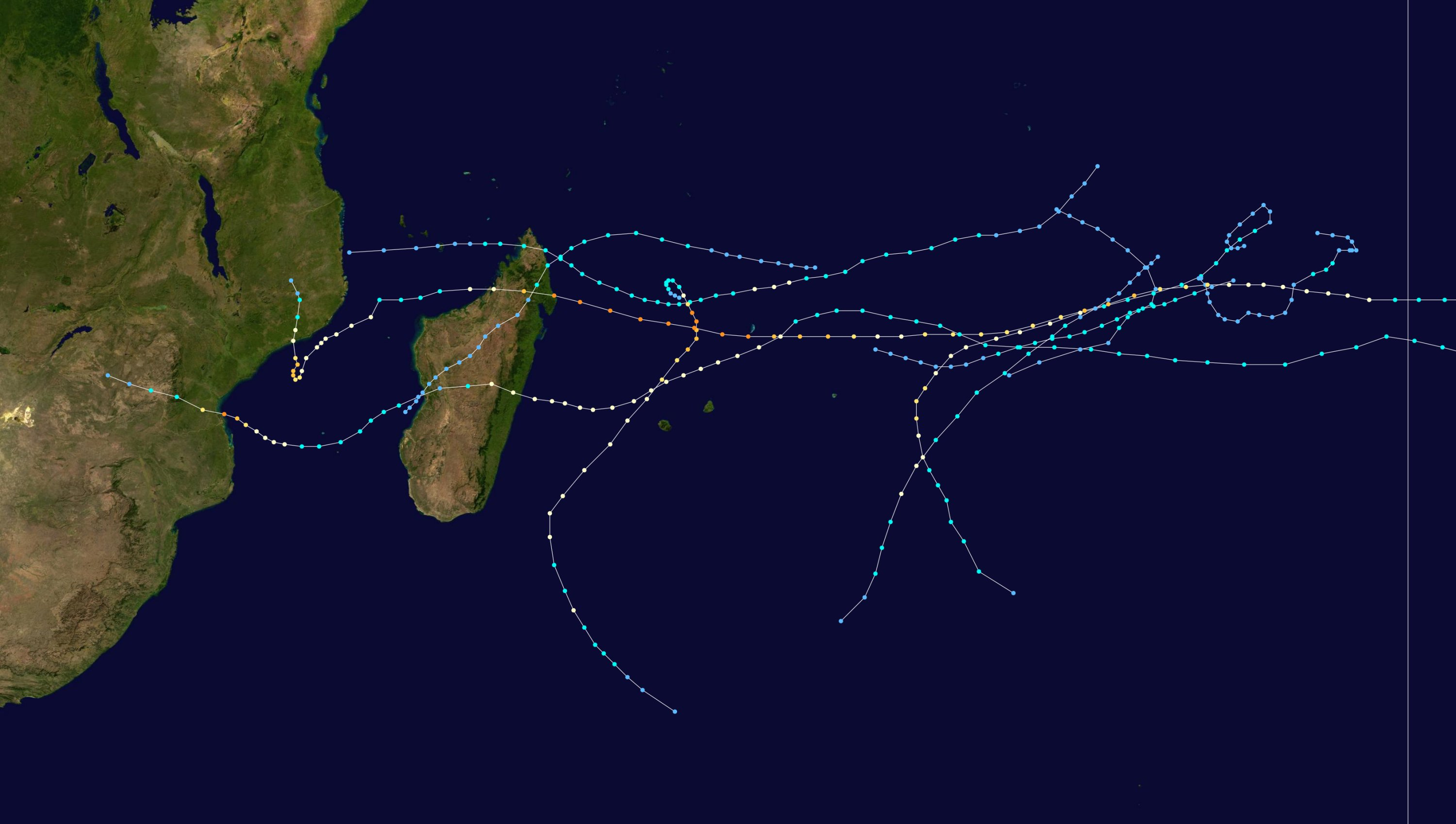
1999–2000 South-West Indian Ocean cyclone season summary map

==== January–June ====
Activity began late, with the first tropical storm – Alda – forming on January 16, the third latest ever recorded at the time. Alda formed in the Mozambique Channel, which was one of few favorable areas for tropical cyclogenesis in the season. It brought rainfall to southwestern Madagascar that alleviated previously dry conditions. The next five tropical storms either originated or crossed into the adjacent Australian basin, where storms were monitored by the Bureau of Meteorology (BoM). Both Tropical Storm Chikita and Tropical Cyclone Davina brought beneficial rainfall to the Mascarene Islands. The latter storm caused two drowning deaths on Réunion and caused some crop damage. The strongest storm – Evrina – peaked as a strong cyclone in the Australian but weakened upon crossing 90°E, with 10-minute maximum sustained winds of 175 km/h (110 mph) in the basin. The final storm was unnamed, crossing from the Australian basin on April 21 as a minimal tropical storm before quickly dissipating. There were also several tropical disturbances or depressions, many short-lived. The first of these formed on September 3 in the northeastern portion of the basin, and there was a tropical depression in February in the Mozambique Channel that approached tropical storm status.

==== July–December ====
Despite the destructive nature of the season, it began later than usual. Cyclone Astride originated toward the end of December, bringing rainfall and gusty winds to northern Madagascar while in the region.

=== Australian Region ===
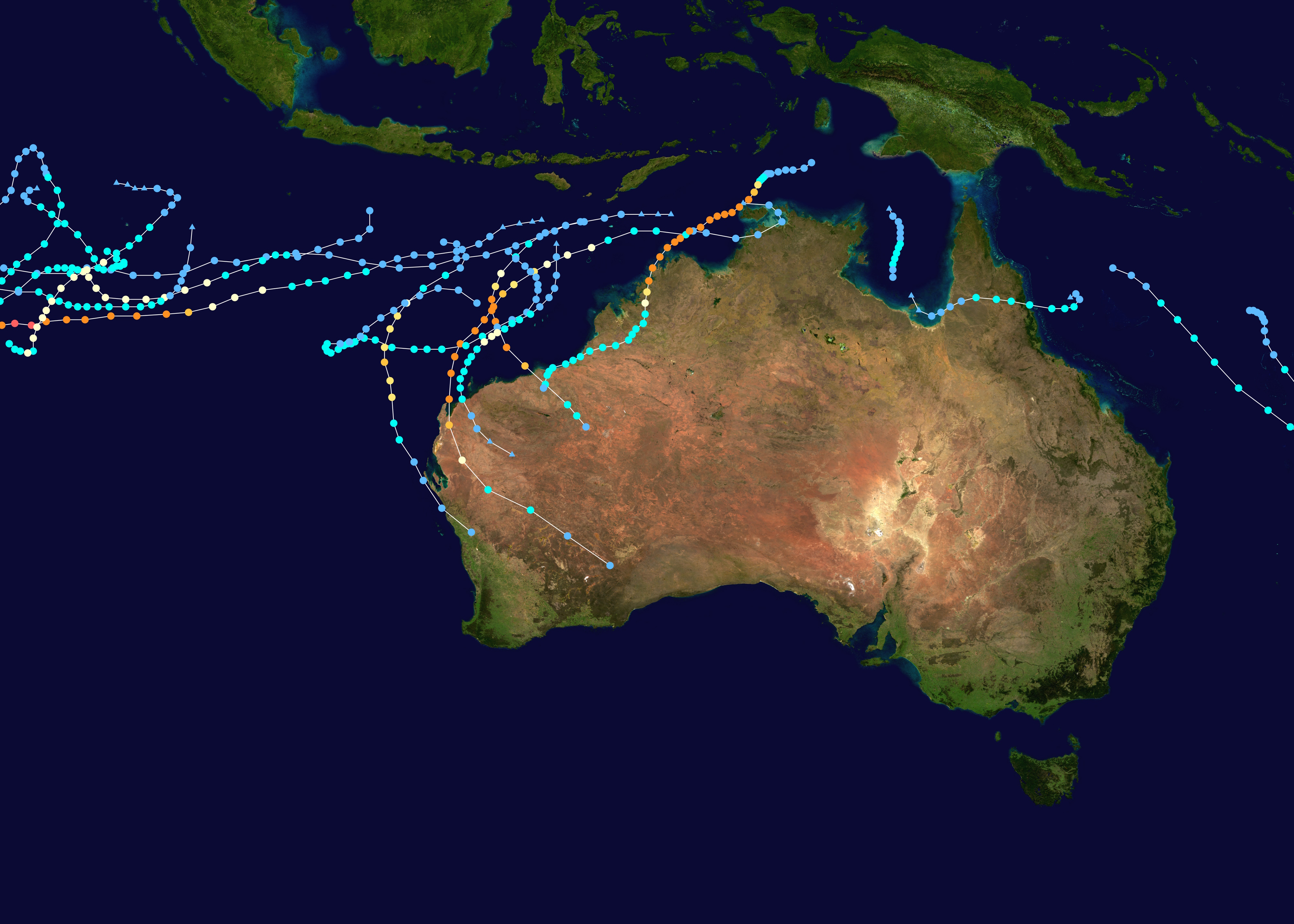
1998–99 Australian region cyclone season summary map

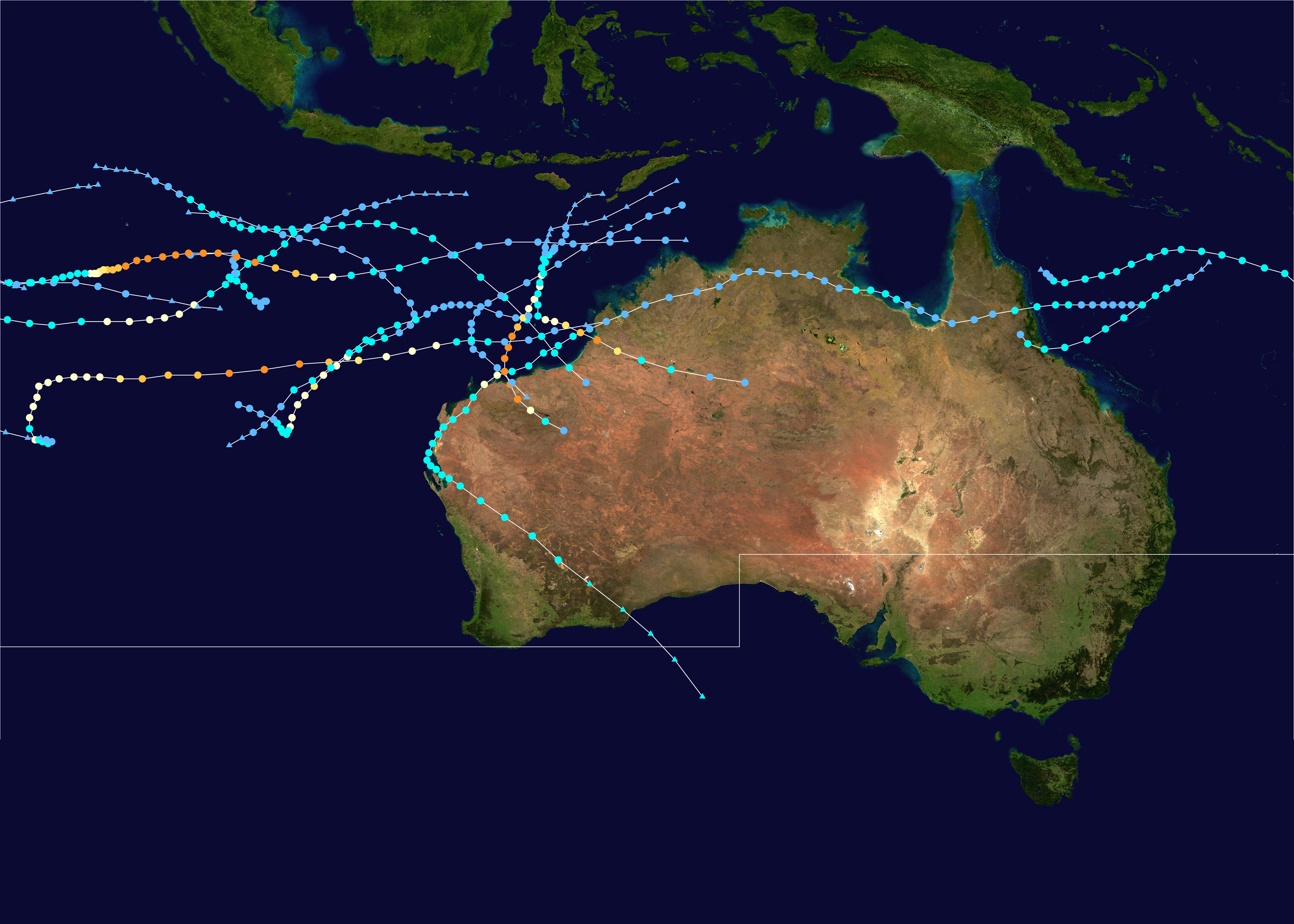
1999–2000 Australian region cyclone season summary map

==== January–June ====
The season featured Cyclone Gwenda, the most intense tropical cyclone in the Australian Region (later tied with Inigo in 2003) . It was above average, with 14 tropical lows, with 9 further strengthening to a tropical cyclone, with 6 of those further becoming a severe tropical cyclone. The 1999 season started with Olinda forming on late January, exiting toward the South Pacific basin the next day. Damien, Rona, Elaine, Vance, Frederick, and Gwenda further strengthened to severe tropical cyclones. Hamish ended the season, exiting the basin to the South-West Indian Ocean on 21 April.

==== July–December ====
3 tropical cyclones formed on late 1999, with 2 of them further becoming tropical cyclones: A tropical low, Ilsa, and John. Ilsa and John briefly affected Western Australia. A tropical low near Brisbane existed from 2 – 3 December.

=== South Pacific Ocean ===
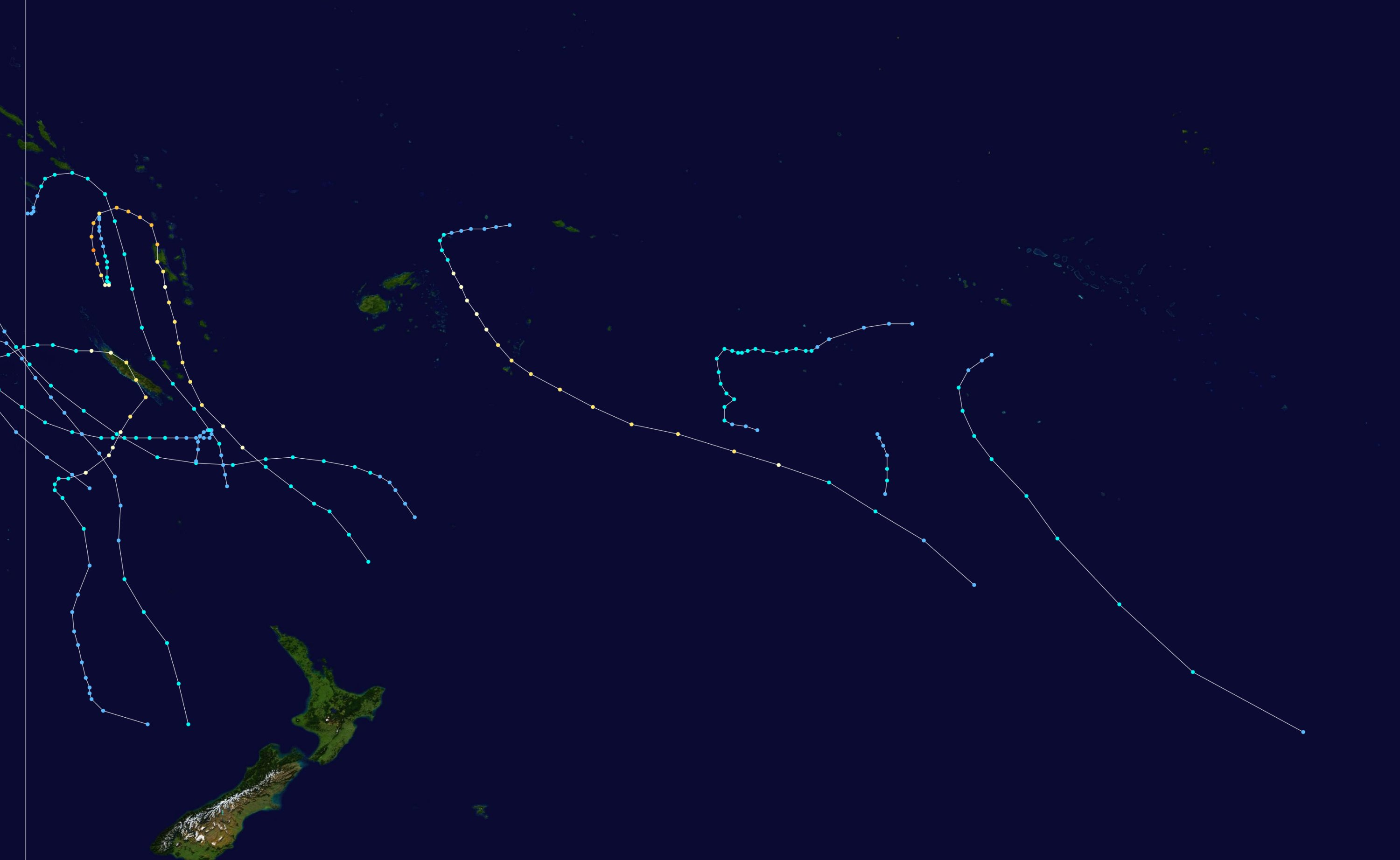
1998–99 South Pacific Ocean cyclone season summary map

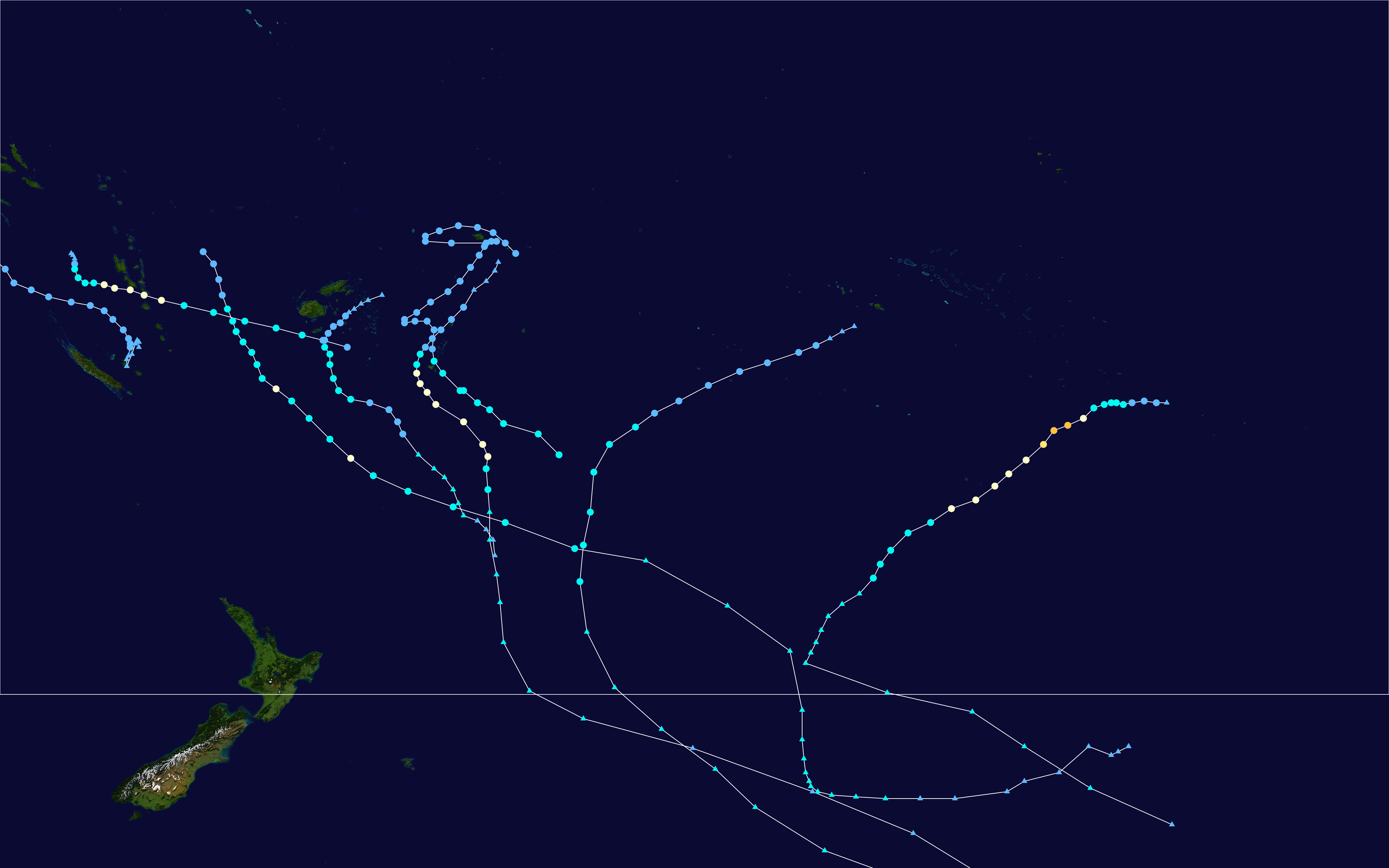
1999–2000 South Pacific Ocean cyclone season summary map

==== January–June ====
The 1998–99 South Pacific cyclone season was a near average South Pacific tropical cyclone season, with 8 tropical cyclones occurring within the South Pacific Ocean basin between 160°E and 120°W. Despite the season starting on November 1, the first tropical system of the season did not form until December 1, while the final disturbance of the season dissipated on May 27, 1999. During the season the most intense tropical cyclone was Severe Tropical Cyclone Cora, which had a minimum pressure of 930 hPa (27.46 inHg). After the season had ended the names Cora and Dani were retired from the naming lists, after they had caused significant impacts to South Pacific islands.

==== July–December ====
5 tropical depressions formed throughout the year; however, they were all weak. A tropical depression existed from September and 4 more tropical depressions monitored by the FMS existed from November to early December.

=== Mediterranean Sea ===
2 medicanes were observed in March 19–21, 1999 and September 13, 1999.

== Systems ==
=== January ===
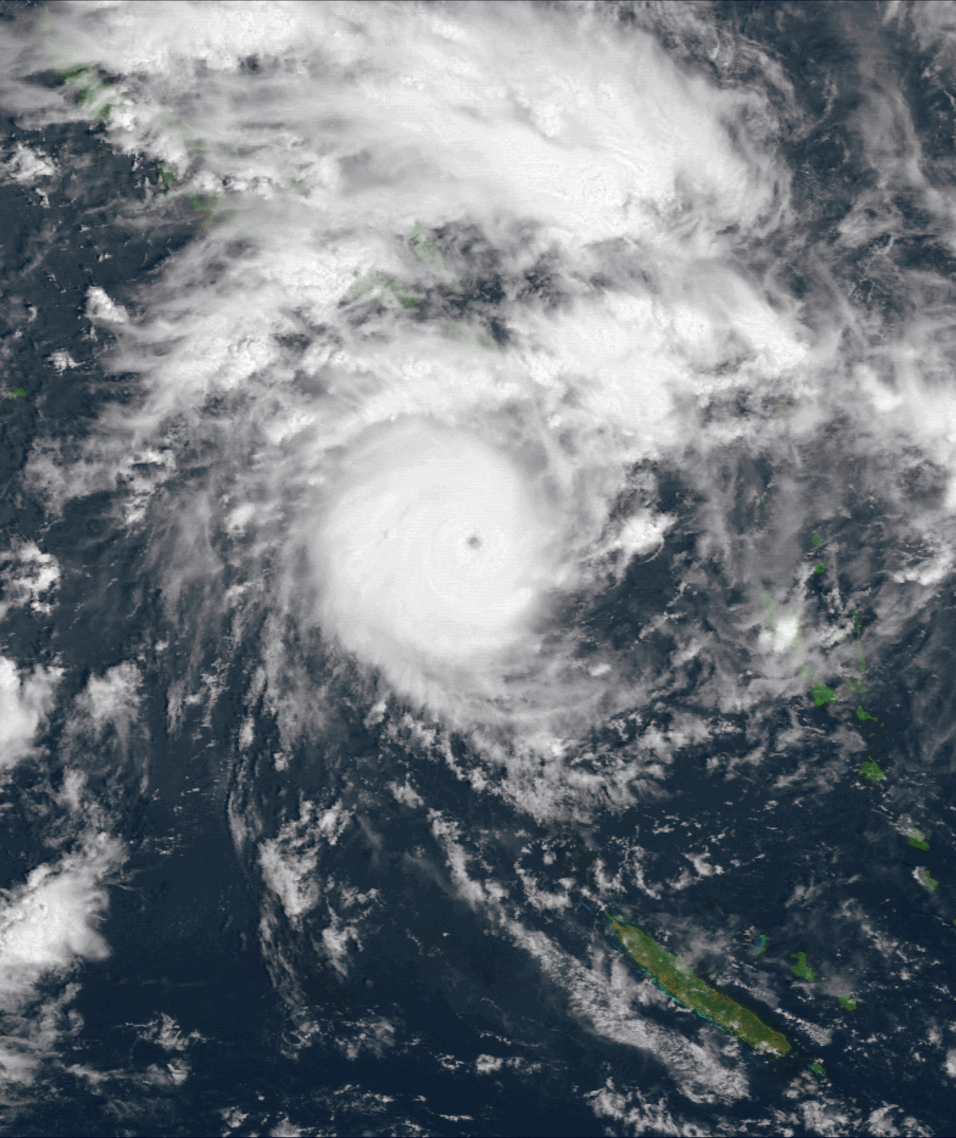
Cyclone Dani

Tropical cyclones formed in January 1999
Storm name	Dates active	Max wind km/h (mph)	Pressure (hPa)	Areas affected	Damage (USD)	Deaths	Refs
05F	January 1–5	Not specified	Not specified	Cook Islands	None	None	
06F	January 3	Not specified	Not specified	French Polynesia	None	None	
A4	January 3–5	55 (35)	996	Madagascar	None	None	
Hilda (Auring)	January 3–8	55 (35)	1000	Malaysia	$1.3 million	5	
Alda	January 14–19	105 (65)	975	Mozambique, Madagascar	Unknown	None	
Dani	January 15–22	175 (110)	930	Vanuatu, New Caledonia, Fiji	$8.5 million	12	
08F	January 16–20	Unknown	Unknown	Fiji	$1.8 million	6	
Olinda	January 20–23	100 (65)	985	New Caledonia	Unknown	None	
Damien–Birenda	January 21–February 2	155 (100)	950	Cocos Islands	None	None	
Pete	January 21–26	100 (65)	985	New Caledonia	Unknown	None	
16P	January 24–27	55 (35)	993	Northern Territory	Unknown	None	
Chikita	January 29–February 4	65 (40)	990	Réunion, Mauritius, Rodrigues	Unknown	None	
18S	January 31–February 14	75 (45)	995	Western Australia	Unknown	None	

=== February ===
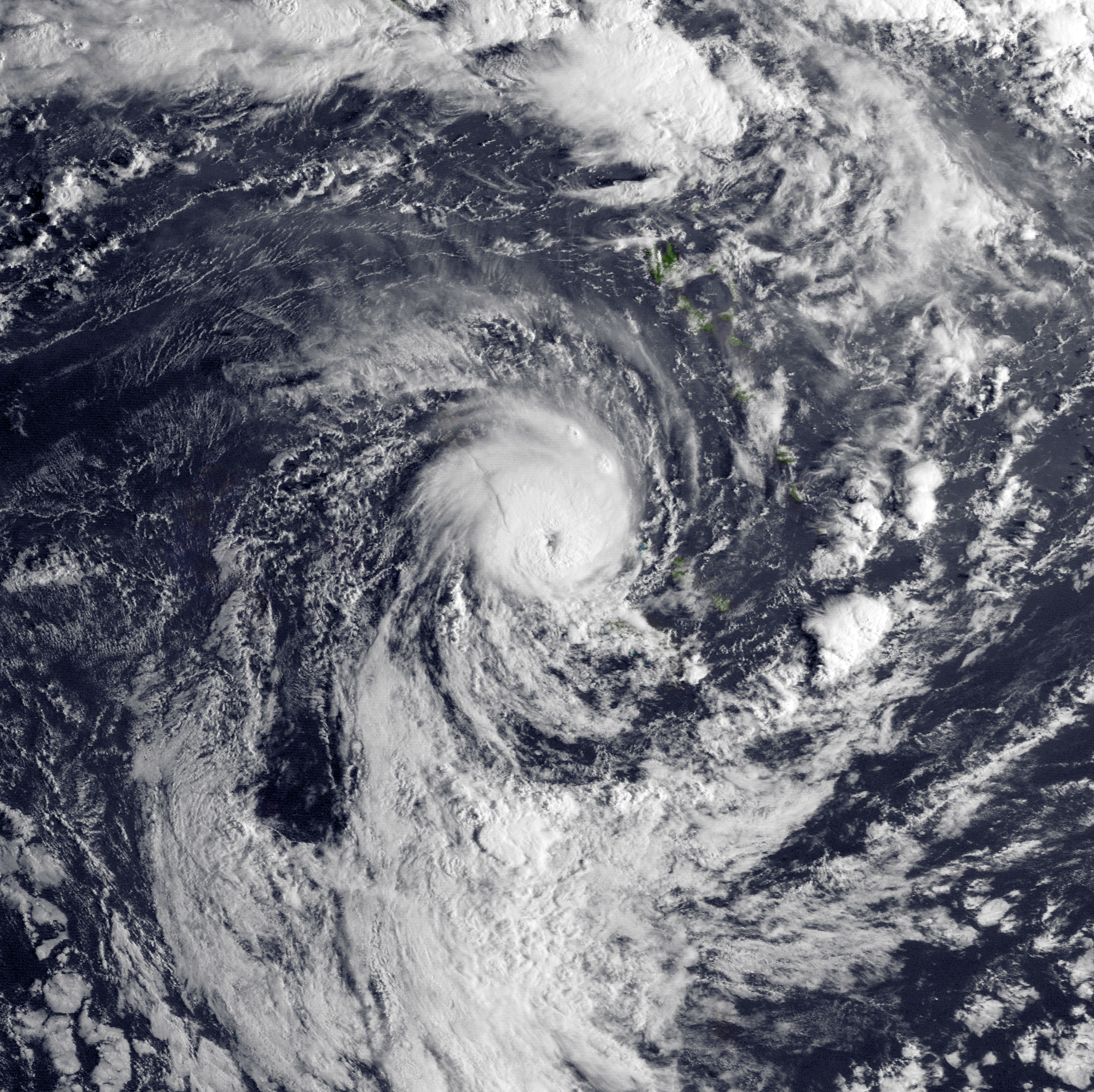
Cyclone Frank

Tropical cyclones formed in February 1999
Storm name	Dates active	Max wind km/h (mph)	Pressure (hPa)	Areas affected	Damage (USD)	Deaths	Refs
BOB 01	February 2–5	95 (60)	998	Sri Lanka	None	None	
11F	February	Unknown	Unknown	None	None	None	
12F	February	Unknown	Unknown	None	None	None	
13F	February	Unknown	Unknown	None	None	None	
Rona	February 9–12	140 (85)	970	Queensland	None	None	
TD	February 9–10	Not specified	1004	None	None	None	
Ella	February 9–13	85 (50)	985	Solomon Islands, Vanuatu, New Caledonia	None	None	
15F	February	Unknown	Unknown	None	None	None	
D1	February 11–17	55 (35)	994	Mozambique, Madagascar	None	None	
Iris (Bebeng)	February 14–19	55 (35)	1000	Chuuk, Palau	None	None	
Frank	February 16–21	150 (90)	955	Eastern Australia, New Caledonia	$150 million	7	
17F	February 17–19	75 (45)	995	Fiji	None	None	
D2-E1	February 23–March 6	45 (30)	1000	Mozambique, Madagascar	None	None	
Gita	February 27–March 2	85 (50)	990	Cook Islands	None	None	

=== March ===
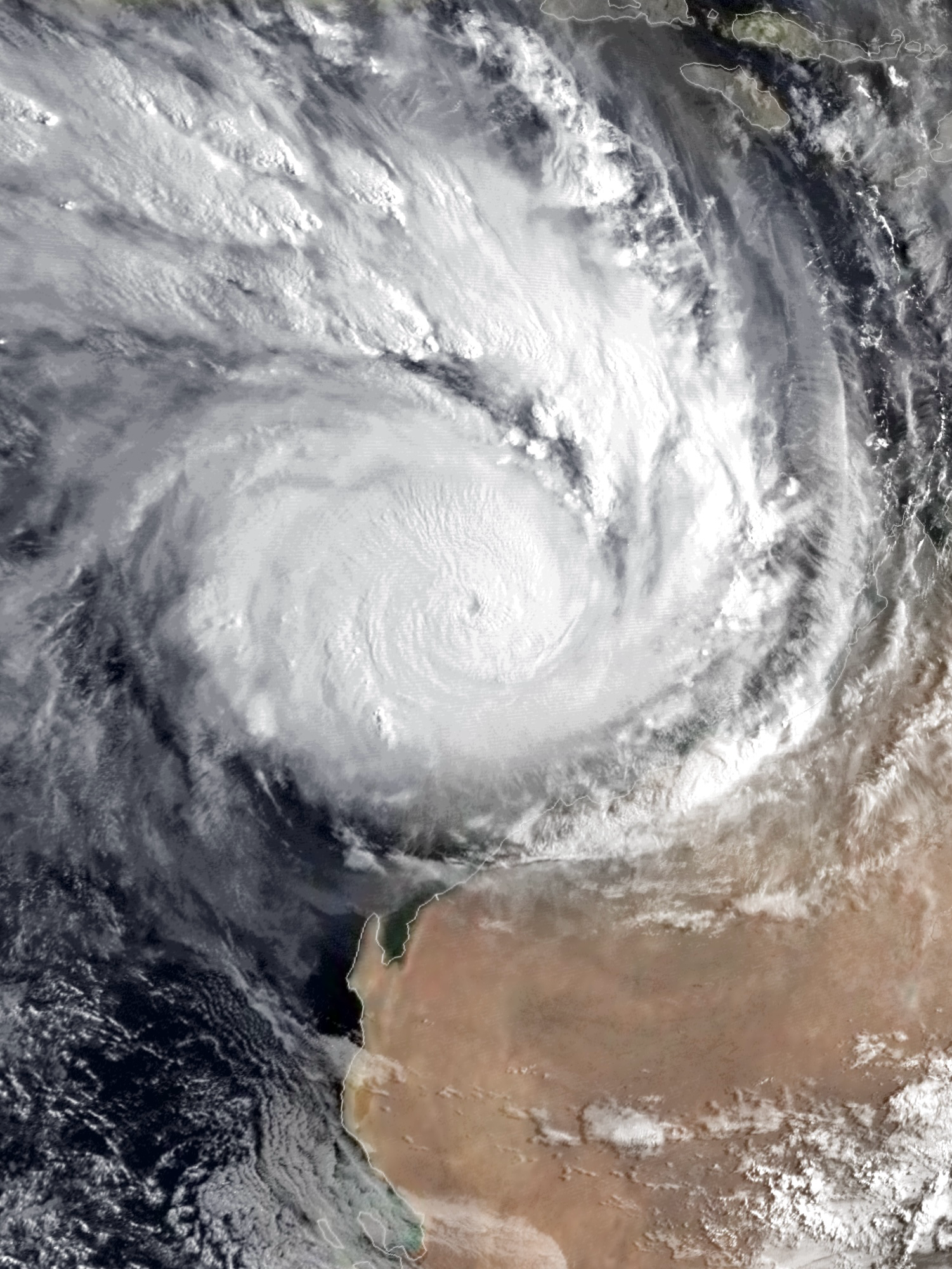
Cyclone Vance

Tropical cyclones formed in March 1999
Storm name	Dates active	Max wind km/h (mph)	Pressure (hPa)	Areas affected	Damage (USD)	Deaths	Refs
Davina	March 2–19	165 (105)	930	Rodrigues	Minor	2	
TL	March 7–14	65 (40)	1000	Unknown	None	None	
E2	March 8–20	Unknown	Unknown	Mauritius	None	None	
E3	March 11–21	Unknown	Unknown	None	None	None	
Hali	March 11–18	120 (75)	970	Cook Islands	None	None	
20F	March 13–18	65 (40)	998	None	None	None	
Elaine	March 15–20	165 (105)	945	Western Australia	Unknown	Unknown	
Vance	March 15–24	215 (130)	910	Northern Territory, Western Australia, South Australia, Victoria, Tasmania	$100 million	None	
TL	March 20–21	≤ 65 (40)	996	Unknown	None	None	
Frederick-Evrina	March 25 – April 10	205 (125)	920	None	None	None	
21F	March 28	Unknown	Unknown	None	None	None	

=== April ===
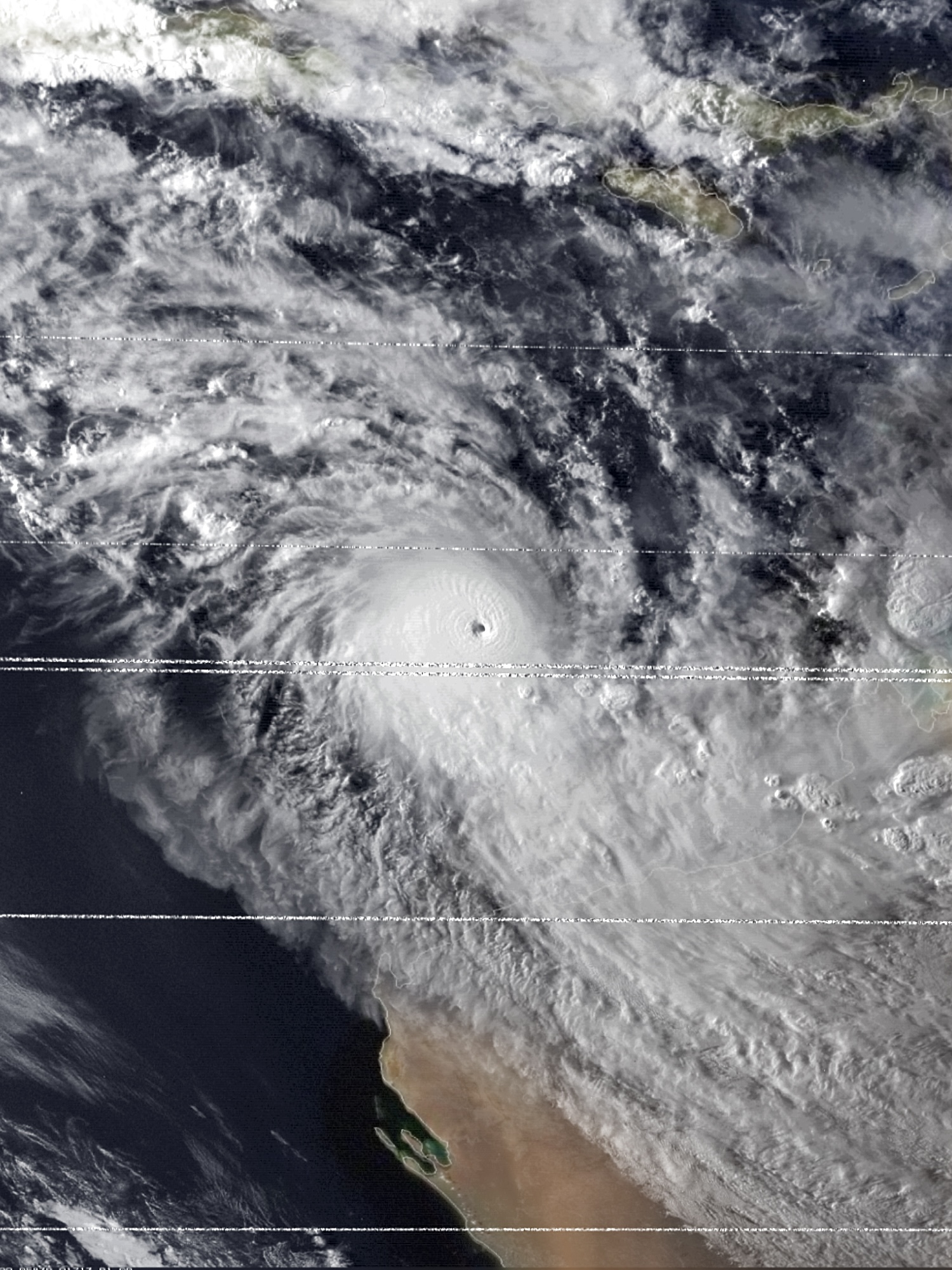
Cyclone Gwenda

Tropical cyclones formed in April 1999
Storm name	Dates active	Max wind km/h (mph)	Pressure (hPa)	Areas affected	Damage (USD)	Deaths	Refs
Gwenda	April 2–8	220 (140)	900	Western Australia	Minimal	None	
Jacob (Katring)	April 6–9	55 (35)	1006	Philippines	None	None	
22F	April 9	Unknown	Unknown	None	None	None	
TL	April 16 – 19	80 (50)	999	Unknown	None	None	(Note: These are the estimated gusts, not the sustained winds.)
Hamish	April 19–21	100 (65)	980	None	None	None	(Note: Hamish, and F1 are the same system.)
F1	April 21–24	65 (40)	992	None	None	None	(Note: Hamish, and F1 are the same system.)
23F	April 21	Unknown	Unknown	None	None	None	
Kate (Diding)	April 21–28	100 (65)	980	Philippines	None	None	
Leo	April 27 – May 2	120 (75)	970	China	Unknown	Unknown	

=== May ===
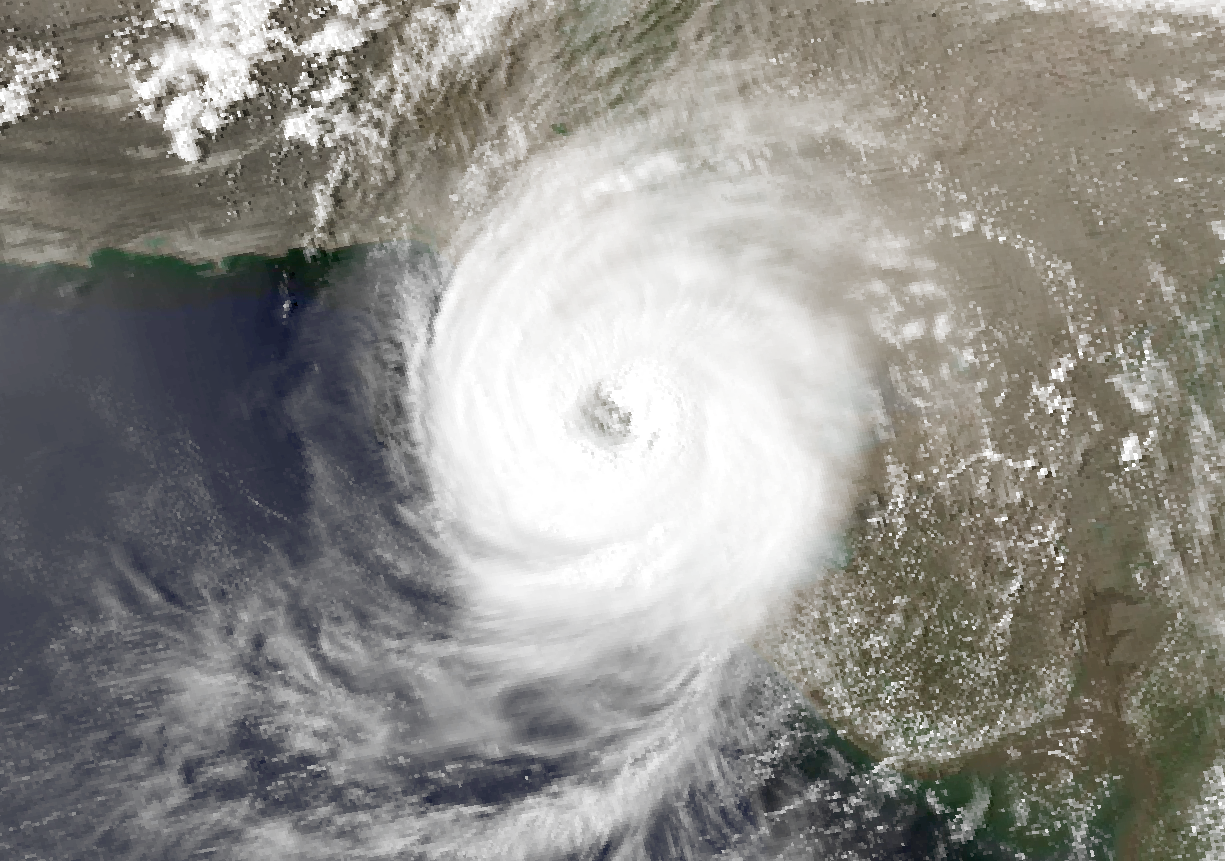
1999 Pakistan cyclone

Around the middle of May, the Intertropical Convergence Zone (ITCZ), which allows for the formation of tropical waves and has previously remained in the Southern Hemisphere for the first five months of the year, moves to the Northern Hemisphere, allowing the northern cyclone seasons to start in earnest. Without the presence of the ITCZ, Southern Hemisphere cyclones must form from non-wave sources, which are rarer. For that reason, cyclone formation is relatively sparse, with May tending to be the month of the final storm in each of the three basins. Meanwhile, more intense storms are nearly unheard of, with the South-West Indian Ocean having seen only one intense tropical cyclone and no very intense tropical cyclones in the month, and the other two basins having similar levels of activity in May. In the Northern Hemisphere, May is the first month most basins see activity, due to the new presence of the ITCZ. The Pacific hurricane season begins on May 15, and although the Atlantic hurricane season officially begins on June 1, off-season storms are very common, with over half of the 21st century seasons seeing a storm form in May. Although the North Indian Ocean has no official start or end date, due to the monsoon, mid-May is the beginning of a month-long period of high activity in the basin. Even in the Western Pacific, activity tends to increase throughout May.

Despite this phenomenon, May was the least active month of the year, with only two tropical cyclones forming, none of which were named. ARB 01 caused the deaths of 6,400 people in India and Pakistan and US$6 million in damage.

Tropical cyclones formed in May 1999
Storm name	Dates active	Max wind km/h (mph)	Pressure (hPa)	Areas affected	Damage (USD)	Deaths	Refs
ARB 01	May 16–22	195 (120)	946	India, Pakistan	$6 million	6,400	
26F	May 20–26	75 (45)	995	Queensland, New Zealand	None	None	

=== June ===
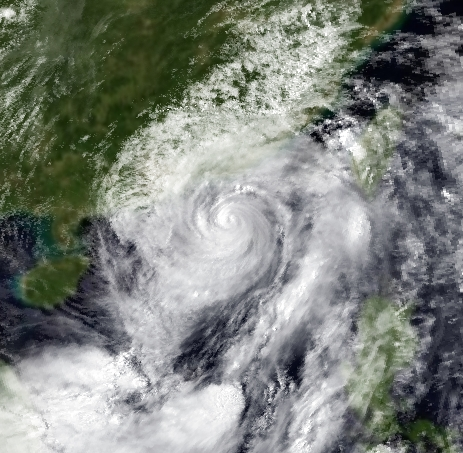
Typhoon Maggie

Tropical cyclones formed in June 1999
Storm name	Dates active	Max wind km/h (mph)	Pressure (hPa)	Areas affected	Damage (USD)	Deaths	Refs
Maggie (Etang)	June 1–9	140 (85)	955	Philippines, Taiwan, Japan, Vietnam, China	$168 million	9	
TD	June 1–2	Not specified	1004	None	None	None	
Gening	June 3–6	55 (35)	996	None	None	None	
03B	June 8–11	65 (40)	997	India	None	None	
TD	June 9–15	55 (35)	996	Japan	None	None	
Arlene	June 11–18	95 (60)	1006	Bermuda	None	None	
BOB 02	June 17	55 (35)	986	India	None	None	
Adrian	June 18–22	155 (100)	973	Mexico	None	6	

=== July ===
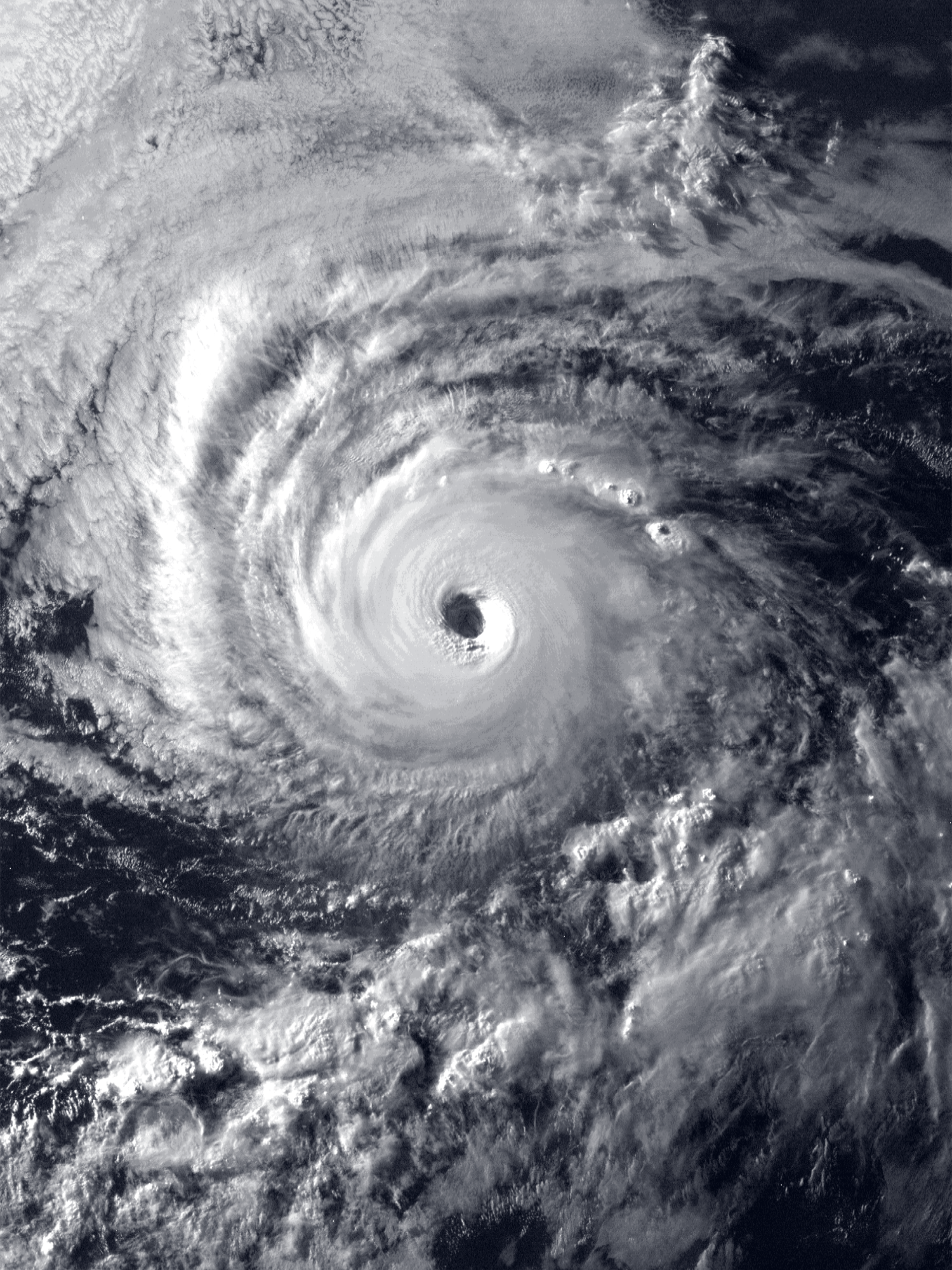
Hurricane Beatriz

Tropical cyclones formed in July 1999
Storm name	Dates active	Max wind km/h (mph)	Pressure (hPa)	Areas affected	Damage (USD)	Deaths	Refs
Two	July 2–3	55 (35)	1003	Mexico	None	None	
Beatriz	July 9–17	195 (120)	955	None	None	None	
TD	July 9–15	55 (35)	996	Japan	None	None	
Three-E	July 14–15	55 (35)	1007	Mexico, Honduras, Nicaragua	None	None	
07W	July 14–18	65 (40)	996	None	None	None	
08W	July 19–23	55 (35)	1004	Japan, South Korea	None	None	
Neil (Helming)	July 22–28	95 (60)	980	Japan, Korea, Ryukyu Islands	Unknown	≥ 8	
Four-E	July 23–25	55 (35)	1007	None	None	None	
10W	July 23–28	75 (45)	985	China	None	None	
Calvin	July 25–27	65 (40)	1005	None	None	None	
Six-E	July 26–28	55 (35)	1005	None	None	None	
BOB 03	July 27–28	55 (35)	990	India	Unknown	Unknown	
Olga	July 29 – August 3	120 (75)	970	Caroline Islands, Ryukyu Islands, Korea	$657 million	106	

=== August ===
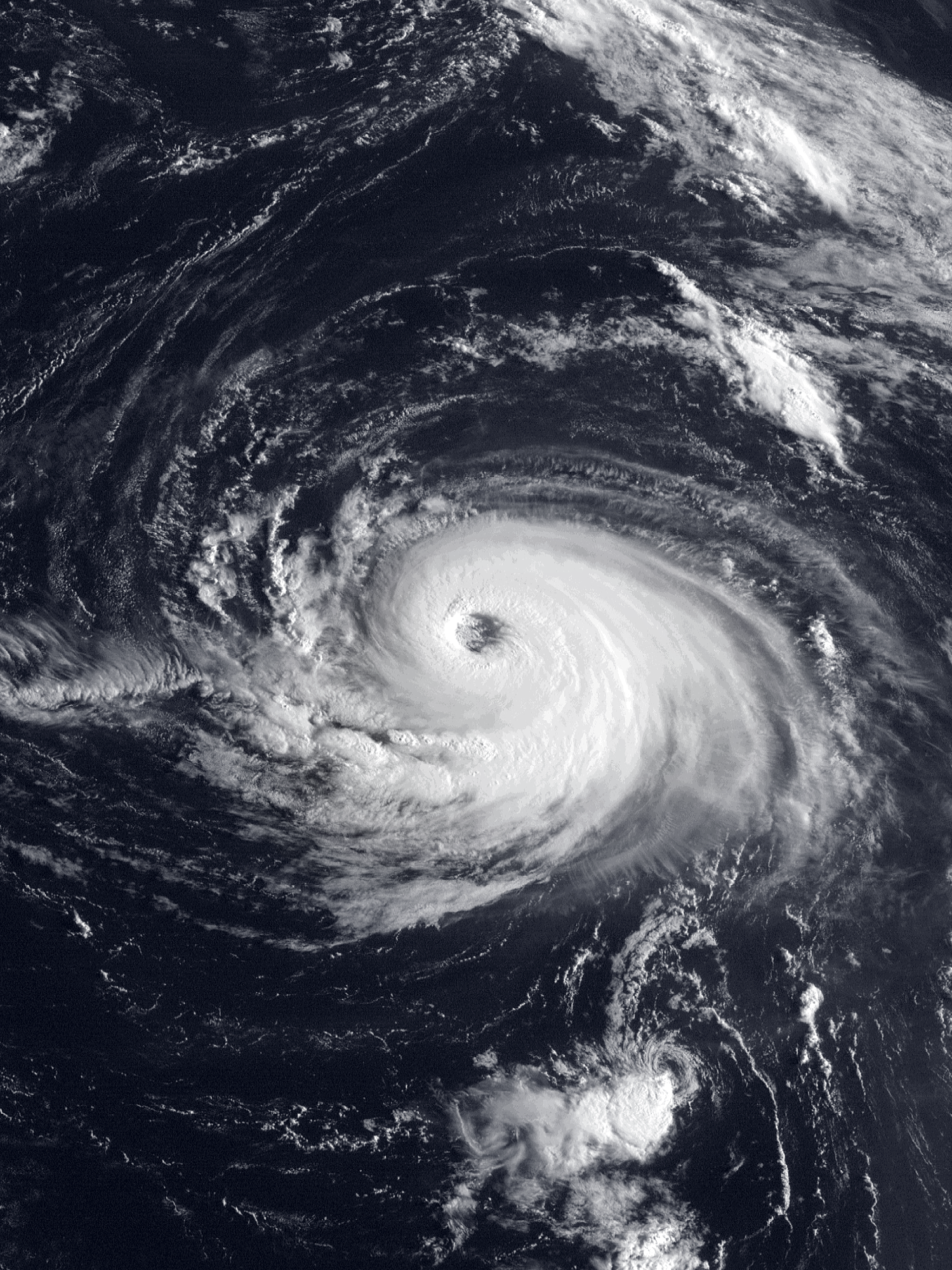
Hurricane Cindy

Tropical cyclones formed in August 1999
Storm name	Dates active	Max wind km/h (mph)	Pressure (hPa)	Areas affected	Damage (USD)	Deaths	Refs
Paul	August 3–9	85 (50)	980	Japan, China, Mariana Islands, Korea	Unknown	None	
Rachel	August 5–11	65 (40)	992	Taiwan, Ryukyu Islands, China	None	None	
BOB 04	August 6–9	45 (30)	992	India	None	None	
Dora	August 6–23	220 (140)	943	Hawaii, Johnston Atoll	Minimal	None	
Eugene	August 6–15	175 (110)	964	Hawaii	None	None	
14W	August 8–10	45 (30)	1000	Japan	None	None	
TD	August 9–11	Not specified	1000	None	None	None	
TD	August 11	Not specified	1000	None	None	None	
TD	August 11–16	Not specified	1000	Japan	None	None	
Nine-E	August 13–15	55 (35)	1005	None	None	None	
15W	August 16–18	45 (30)	1002	Korea, Japan	None	None	
TD	August 16–17	Not specified	1010	None	None	None	
Fernanda	August 17–22	100 (65)	994	None	None	None	
Sam	August 17–24	100 (65)	980	Philippines, China	$35 million	20	
Bret	August 18–25	230 (145)	944	Texas, Mexico	$15 million	7	
Cindy	August 19–31	220 (140)	942	Cape Verde, Bermuda	None	1	
Tanya	August 19–24	95 (60)	1000	None	None	None	
18W	August 21–24	55 (35)	1000	None	None	None	
Eleven-E	August 23–24	55 (35)	1000	Baja California Peninsula	None	None	
Virgil	August 23–29	95 (60)	994	None	None	None	
Dennis	August 24 – September 9	165 (105)	962	The Bahamas, Florida, Georgia, North Carolina, Virginia, Mid-Atlantic, New England, Ontario, Quebec	$157 million	6	
Emily	August 24–28	85 (50)	1004	None	None	None	
Wendy (Mameng)	August 29 – September 4	65 (40)	995	Philippines, China	$309.4 million	133	
TD	August 30	Not specified	1008	None	None	None	

=== September ===
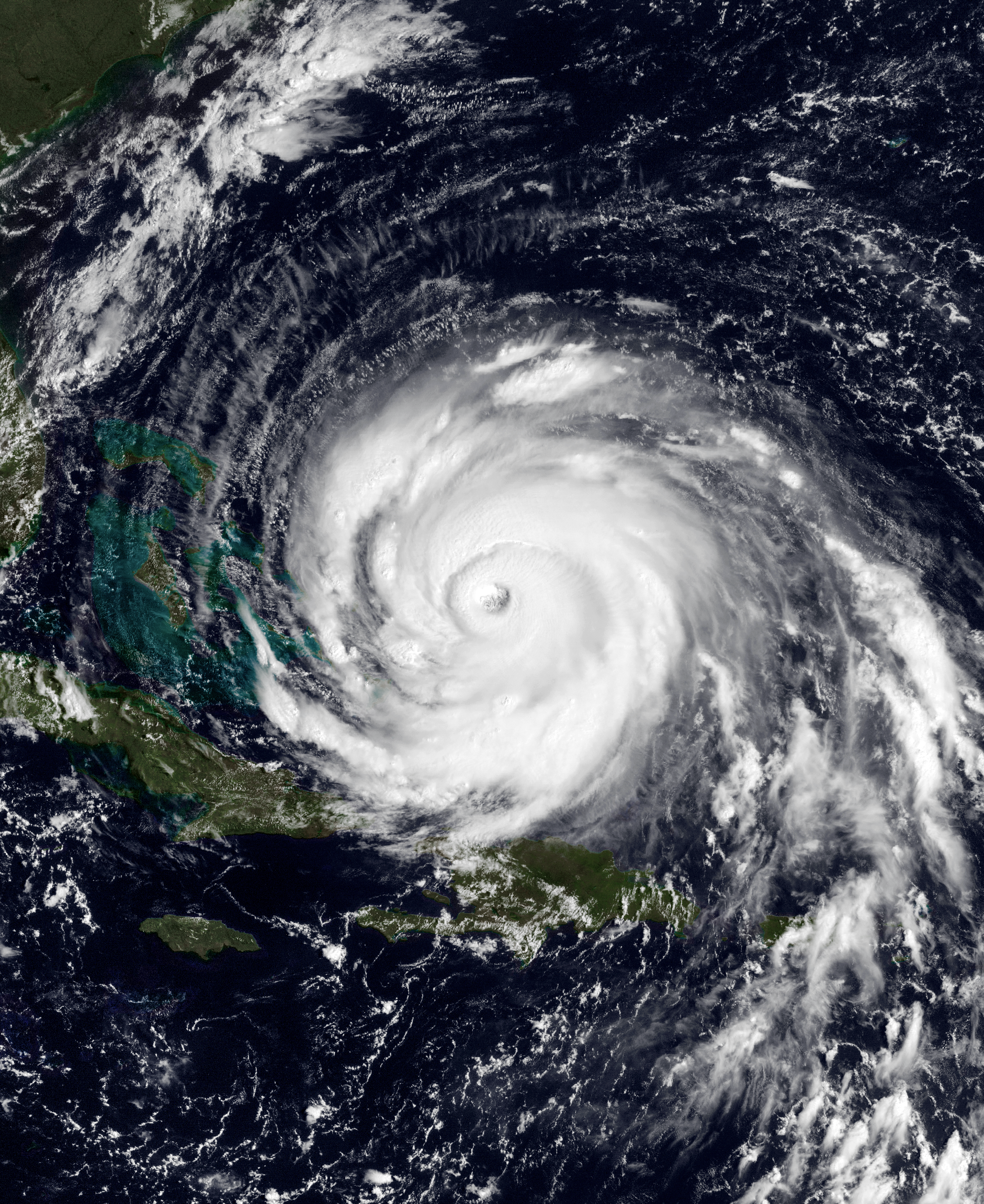
Hurricane Floyd

September was active, with twelve tropical cyclones, ten of which were named. The month began with Hurricane Greg from the eastern Pacific, which killed 10 people on the Baja California Peninsula, although damage was moderate. Hurricane Floyd produced torrential rainfall in Eastern North Carolina, adding more rain to an area already hit by Hurricane Dennis just weeks earlier. The rains caused widespread flooding over a period of several weeks; nearly every river basin in the eastern part of the state exceeded 500-year flood levels. In total, Floyd was responsible for 85 fatalities and $6.5 billion (1999 USD) in damage. Tropical Storm York from the Western Pacific caused heavy rainfall and flooding when it crossed over the Philippines, which claimed the lives of 18 people. York is particularly noted for leading to the Hong Kong Observatory issuing the highest No. 10 warning for the first time since 1983 as well as killing two people in Hong Kong when it passed near the city. A cargo ship reportedly sunk, 18,000 homes lost power in the wake of the storm and 4,000 trees were uprooted in Hong Kong. In Macau, one person was injured and 120 incidents related to the storm were reported. In the Chinese province of Guangdong, fifteen people lost their lives and from the heavy rainfall. Hurricane Gert threatened to strike Bermuda, prompting the evacuation of tourists. Although Gert's center did not make landfall, it passed a short distance east of the island, producing hurricane-force winds that left 11,000 people without power. High waves swept two people out to sea at Acadia National Park in Maine. Later, strong waves struck Newfoundland and left heavy marine damage. Tropical Storm Ann brought moderate rain of up to 100 mm (3.9 in) to Anhui, Jiangsu and Shandong on September 18. Rains of up to 200 mm (7.9 in) from Ann and Typhoon Bart saturated South Korea and southwestern Japan, causing flooding and damage to rice paddies. Typhoon Bart (Oniang) was the most intense tropical cyclone in the basin, killing 36 people in Japan and causing damage to US$1.43 billion.

Tropical cyclones formed in September 1999
Storm name	Dates active	Max wind km/h (mph)	Pressure (hPa)	Areas affected	Damage (USD)	Deaths	Ref(s)
Greg	September 5–9	120 (75)	986	Western Mexico, Baja California Peninsula	Moderate	10	
Seven-E	September 5–7	55 (35)	1006	Mexico, Texas	Unknown	None	
TD	September 5–6	65 (40)	1000	None	None	None	
Floyd	September 7–19	250 (155)	921	The Bahamas, East Coast of the United States, Atlantic Canada	$6.5 billion	85	
York (Neneng)	September 10–17	100 (65)	980	Philippines, China	$34 million	35	
Gert	September 11–23	240 (150)	930	Bermuda, Maine, Atlantic Canada	$1.9 million	2	
Zia	September 11–15	85 (50)	985	Japan	Unknown	9	
Ann	September 14–19	95 (60)	985	Taiwan, China, Korea, Ryukyu Islands	Unknown	None	
Hillary	September 17–21	120 (75)	987	Baja California Peninsula	None	None	
Bart (Oniang)	September 17–30	165 (105)	930	Taiwan, Ryukyu Islands, Japan, South Korea, North Korea, Russia	$1.43 billion	36	
Harvey	September 19–22	95 (60)	994	Florida, Georgia, North Carolina, South Carolina, Atlantic Canada	≥ $22.6 million	None	
TD	September 21	Not specified	1008	None	None	None	
Cam	September 22–26	85 (50)	992	China	Unknown	1	

=== October ===
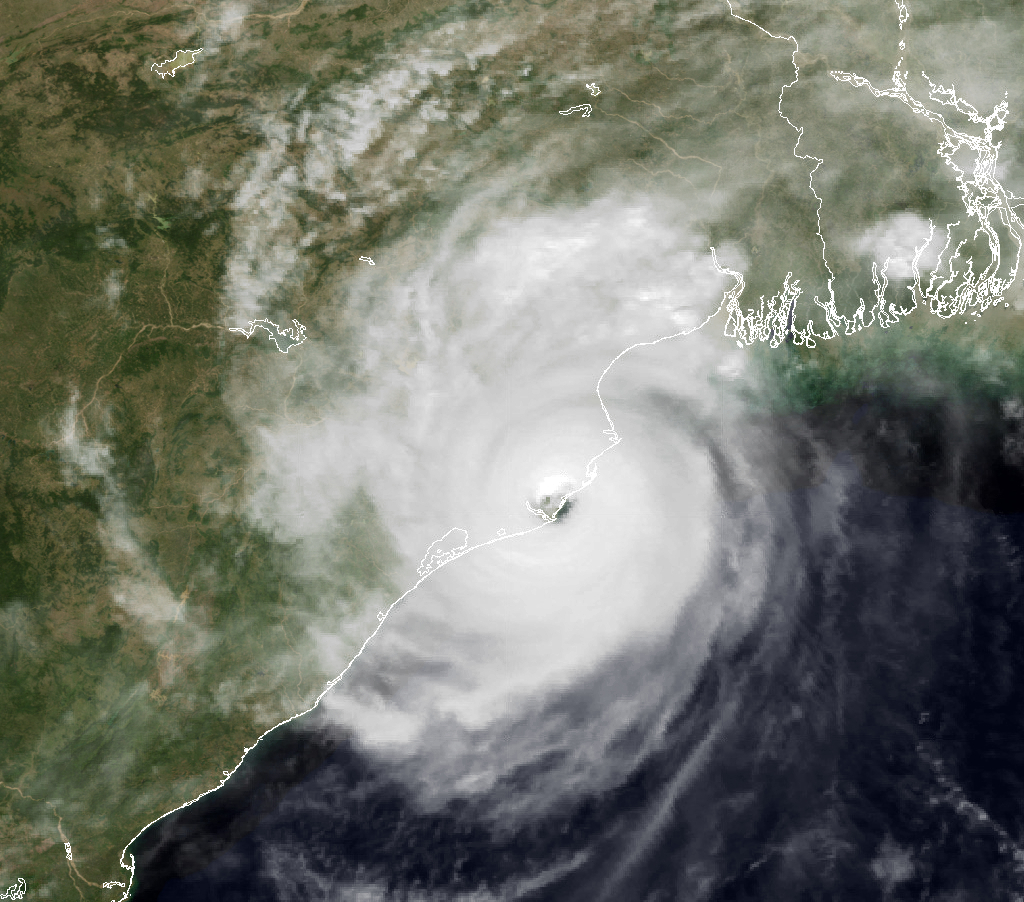
1999 Odisha cyclone

October was active, with eleven tropical cyclones forming, eight of which were named. The month began with the formation of Typhoon Dan (Pepang) in the Western Pacific, which brought heavy rains and widespread flooding to the Philippines, China, and Taiwan, resulting in the deaths of 44 people and $242 million in damage. Tropical Depression Eleven and its remnants contributed significantly to the October 1999 Mexico floods, bring up to 43.23 in (1,098 mm) of rain to Jalacingo, Veracruz. Throughout Mexico, 90,000 houses were damaged or destroyed, leaving about 500,000 people homeless. and more than 400 people dead. Tropical Storm Irwin from the Eastern Pacific, brought patches of heavy rainfall to some areas of Mexico, peaking at 9.92 inches (252 mm) in Coahuayutla de Guerrero, Guerrero. Hurricane Irene produced heavy rainfall across Greater Antilles, causing four deaths and damage. Irene was a wet Florida hurricane in October. It later dropped 10 to 20 inches (254 to 508 millimetres) of rainfall in the Miami metropolitan area, causing urban flooding unseen since Hurricane Dennis in 1981. Despite being only a Category 1 hurricane, Irene caused eight indirect deaths and $800 million (1999 USD) in damage across Florida. Tropical Storm Eve brought torrential rain to much of central Vietnam, with about 290 mm (11 in) falling on Huế City and as much as 470 mm (19 in) of rain falling in parts of Hà Tĩnh Province. Eve was the first in a series of storms to bring torrential rain to the region, and the resulting floods killed over 622 people, and they also caused nearly $235 million of damage directly. Extremely Severe Cyclonic Storm BOB 05 (04B) was responsible for 198 fatalities and hundreds of houses and huts in low-lying areas were destroyed by flooding. Several thousand others were injured by the storm and hundreds were left homeless. The Prime Minister of India requested that relief supplies be distributed to the affected region immediately. Hurricane Jose brought heavy rainfall to the Lesser Antilles, causing the death of three people and damage amounted to near $5 million (1999 USD). The 1999 Odisha cyclone was the most intense cyclone in the basin, claiming the lives of at least 9,887 people and 406,000 livestock. Damages from the storm totaled $4.44 billion (1999 USD). Tropical Storm Katrina produced heavy rains, estimated up to 15 in (380 mm) in mountainous areas, triggering mudslides and flash flooding.

Tropical cyclones formed in October 1999
Storm name	Dates active	Max wind km/h (mph)	Pressure (hPa)	Areas affected	Damage (USD)	Deaths	Ref(s)
Dan (Pepang)	October 2–10	150 (90)	955	South Korea, Philippines, Taiwan, China	$242 million	44	
Eleven	October 4–6	55 (35)	1002	Central Mexico	$491.3 million	636	
Twelve	October 6–8	55 (35)	1007	None	None	None	
Irwin	October 8–11	95 (60)	996	Southwestern Mexico	Minimal	None	
Irene	October 12–19	175 (110)	958	Cuba, Bahamas, Southeastern United States	$800 million	18	
Eve (Rening)	October 15–20	85 (50)	990	Philippines, Vietnam	$235 million	590	
BOB 05	October 15–19	165 (105)	968	India, Myanmar	Unknown	80	
Jose	October 17–25	155 (100)	979	Lesser Antilles, Puerto Rico	$5 million	3	
TD	October 23–24	Unknown	1004	Vietnam, Thailand	None	None	
BOB 06	October 25–31	260 (160)	912	India, Thailand, Myanmar, Bangladesh	$4.44 billion	9,887	
Katrina	October 28–November 1	65 (40)	999	Central America, Mexico	$9,000	None	

=== November ===
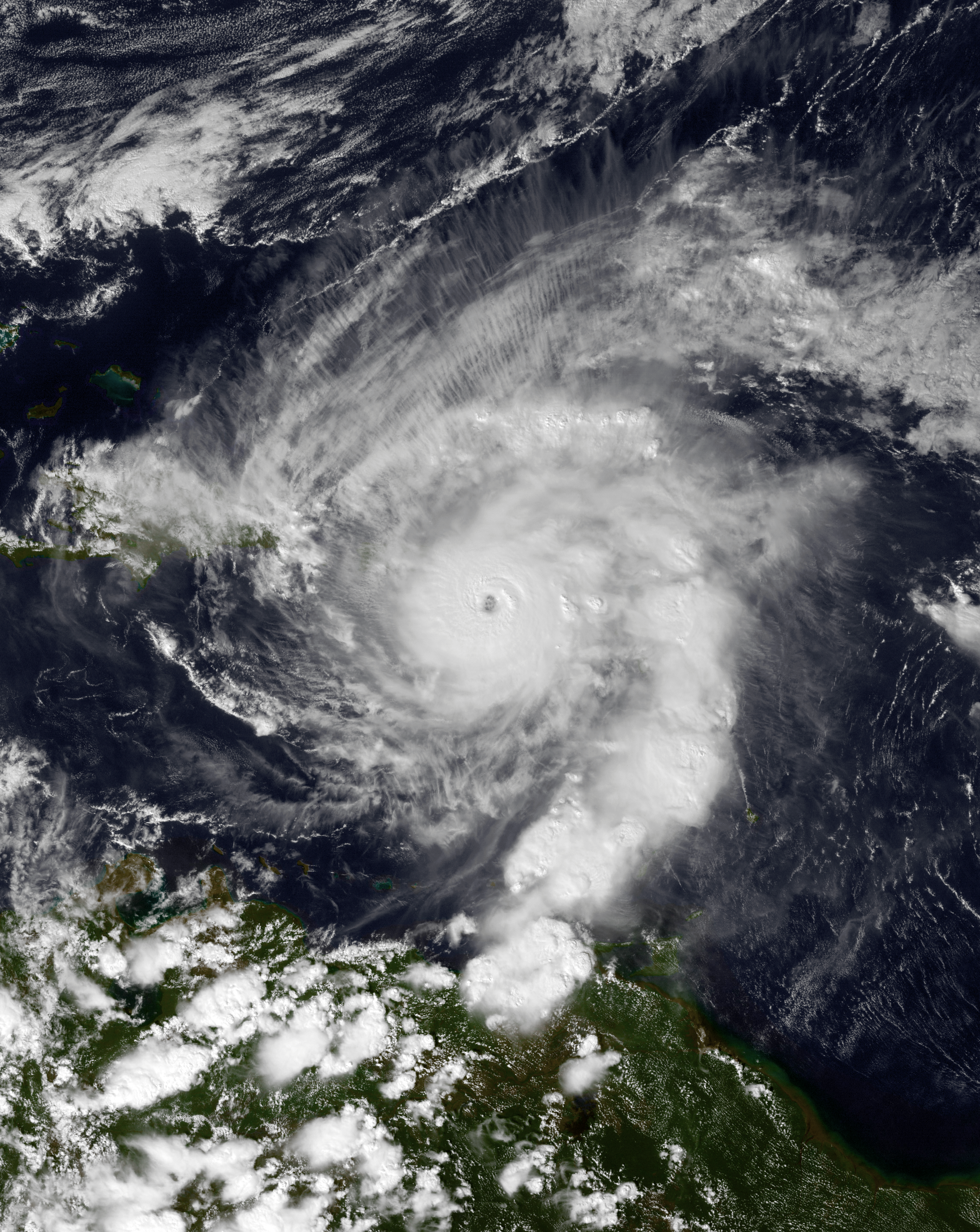
Hurricane Lenny

November was less active, with five tropical cyclones, two of them were named. Tropical Storm Frankie brought heavy rain of up to 300 mm (12 in) to the central Philippines, that disrupted the rice harvest. Flooding from the storm forced the evacuation of 300 families in Calbayog. Hurricane Lenny was the strongest November Atlantic hurricane since the 1932 Cuba hurricane. Lenny went on to form and maintain an unusual and unprecedented easterly track for its entire duration, which gave it the common nickname, "Wrong Way Lenny". It attained hurricane status south of Jamaica on November 15 and passed south of Hispaniola and Puerto Rico over the next few days. Typhoon Gloria did not approach land closely. Gloria was the last name to use English names in the Western Pacific.

Tropical cyclones formed in November 1999
Storm name	Dates active	Max wind km/h (mph)	Pressure (hPa)	Areas affected	Damage (USD)	Deaths	Refs
TD	November 5	Unknown	1002	Vietnam	None	None	
28W	November 5–6	55 (35)	1000	None	None	None	
Frankie (Sendang)	November 6–10	55 (35)	996	Philippines	None	None	
Lenny	November 13–23	250 (155)	933	Colombia, Puerto Rico, Leeward Islands	$785.8 million	17	
Gloria (Trining)	November 13–16	95 (60)	980	None	None	None	

=== December ===
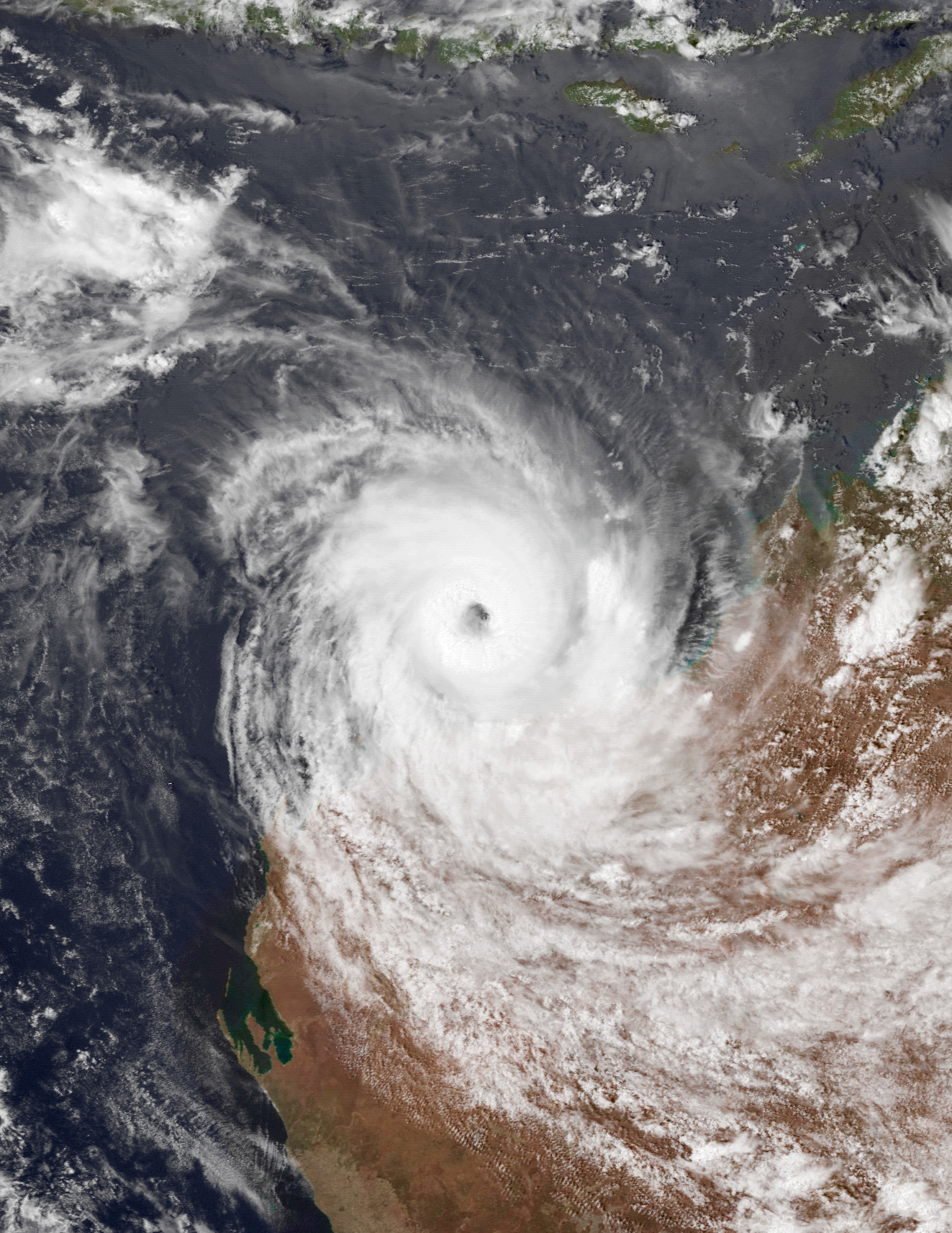
Cyclone John

December was almost less active, with ten tropical cyclones, three of which were named. Cyclone Ilsa formed in mid-December, other than producing heavy rain, Ilsa did not produce significant damage. Cyclone John extensively affected areas of Western Australia, but damage was not as bad as expected. Widespread power outages across the Pilbara region were caused by John. Severe Tropical Storm Astride from South-West Indian Ocean brought strong winds, including 10‑minute sustained winds of 101 km/h (63 mph) and gusts to 127 km/h (79 mph). No damage was reported in Madagascar during the storm's passage there. When Astride passed just south of Mayotte, it brought gusts to 76 km/h (47 mph), strong enough to knock over some banana trees and to destroy a stone house. The storm also dropped 150 mm (5.9 in) of rainfall over 24 hours, including 41 mm (1.6 in) in one hour. Heavy rainfall accompanied Astride's final landfall, penetrating as far inland as Malawi.

Tropical cyclones formed in December 1999
Storm name	Dates active	Max wind km/h (mph)	Pressure (hPa)	Areas affected	Damage (USD)	Deaths	Refs
31W	December 1–5	55 (35)	1000	Thailand, Vietnam	None	None	
03F	December 1–3	55 (35)	1006	None	None	None	
TL	December 2–3	55 (35)	1002	Queensland	None	None	
04F	December 5–7	65 (40)	1003	None	None	None	
BOB 07	December 8–10	45 (30)	998	India, Sri Lanka	None	None	
Ilsa	December 9–17	100 (65)	980	Christmas Island, Western Australia	Unknown	None	
32W	December 9–11	55 (35)	1000	Vietnam, Cambodia	None	None	
John	December 9–16	205 (125)	915	Western Australia	Unknown	None	
33W	December 14–16	55 (35)	1000	Vietnam	Unknown	None	
Astride	December 23 – January 3	95 (60)	985	Réunion, Mozambique, Madagascar, Mauritius, Rodrigues	Minor	None	

== Global effects ==
There are a total of seven tropical cyclone basins that tropical cyclones typically form in this table, data from all these basins are added.

Season name		Areas affected	Systems formed	Named storms	Hurricane-force tropical cyclones	Damage (1999 USD)	Deaths	Ref.
North Atlantic Ocean (Note: The wind speeds for this tropical cyclone/basin are based on the Saffir Simpson Scale which uses 1-minute sustained winds.)		Lucayan Archipelago, Mexico, Cape Verde, Southeastern United States, Mid-Atlantic states, Atlantic Canada, Lesser Antilles, Greater Antilles, Central America, South America	16	12	8	>$8.78 billion	726 (49)	
Eastern and Central Pacific Ocean		Western Mexico, Baja California Peninsula, Hawaii, Johnston Atoll	14	9	6	Unknown	16	
Western Pacific Ocean (Note: Only systems that formed either before or on December 31, 1999 are counted in the seasonal totals.)		Malaysia, Philippines, China, Taiwan, Japan, Korea, Caroline Islands, Mariana Islands, Ryukyu Islands, Wake Island, Vietnam, Thailand	43	19	11	$3.63 billion	1,798	
North Indian Ocean (Note: The wind speeds for this tropical cyclone/basin are based on the IMD Scale which uses 3-minute sustained winds.)		India, Myanmar, Sri Lanka, Pakistan, Thailand, Bangladesh	8	4	3	$5,45 billion	16,485	
South-West Indian Ocean	January – June (Note: Only systems that formed either on or after January 1, 1999 are counted in the seasonal totals.) (Note: The wind speeds for this tropical cyclone are based on Météo-France, which uses wind gusts.)	Mozambique, Diego Garcia, Réunion	9	4 (Note: According to the BoM, Cyclones Vince and Damien entered the South-West Indian ocean basin from the Australian region)	2	Unknown	—N/a	
South-West Indian Ocean	July – December	Réunion, Mozambique, Madagascar, Mauritius, Rodrigues	1	1	1	—N/a	—N/a	
Australian region	January – June	Australia	14	9	5	$250 million	7	
Australian region	July – December	Australia	3	2	1	—N/a	—N/a	
South Pacific Ocean	January – June	Vanuatu, New Caledonia, Fiji, Solomon Islands, Cook Islands, French Polynesia, New Zealand	19	5	2	Unknown	—N/a	
South Pacific Ocean	July – December	—N/a	5	—N/a	—N/a	—N/a	—N/a	
Worldwide		(See above)	132 (Note: The sum of the number of systems in each basin will not equal the number shown as the total. This is because when systems move between basins, it creates a discrepancy in the actual number of systems.)	65	39	$18.1 billion	19,032 (49)	

== See also ==
- Tropical cyclones by year
- List of earthquakes in 1999
- Tornadoes of 1999
