= 1999 hurricane season =

1999 hurricane season may refer to:

- The 1999 Atlantic hurricane season
- The 1999 Pacific hurricane season
