= Hurricane Dora (1999) =

Category 4 Pacific hurricane in 1999

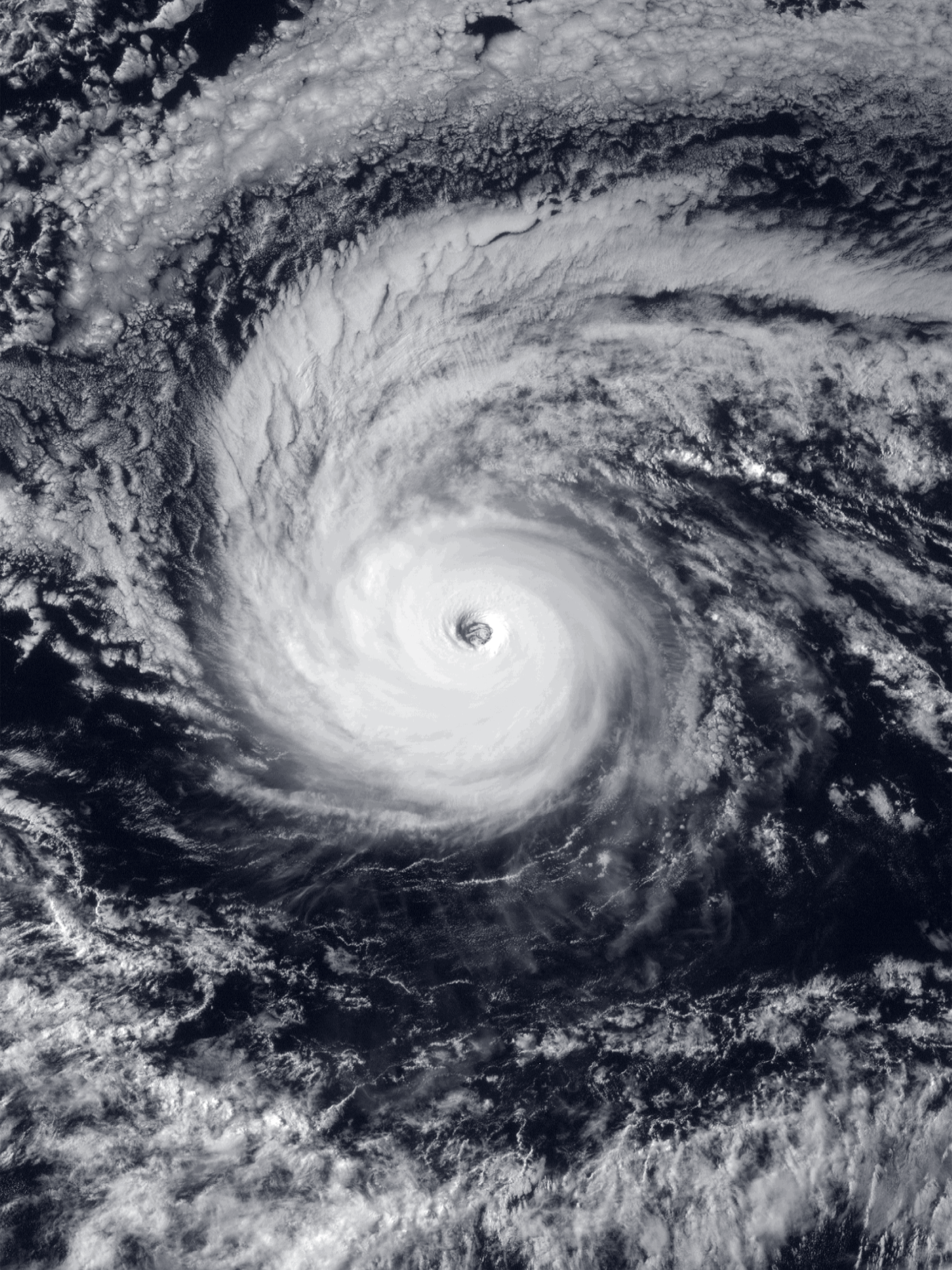
- Dora at peak intensity on August 12

Meteorological history
- Formed: August 6, 1999
- Dissipated: August 23, 1999

Category 4 major hurricane
- 1-minute sustained (SSHWS/NWS)
- Highest winds: 140 mph (220 km/h)
- Lowest pressure: 943 mbar (hPa); 27.85 inHg

Overall effects
- Fatalities: None
- Damage: Minimal
- Areas affected: Hawaii, Johnston Atoll
- IBTrACS
- Part of the 1999 Pacific hurricane and typhoon seasons

Hurricane Dora was one of few tropical cyclones to track across all three north Pacific basins and the first since Hurricane John in 1994. The fourth named storm, third hurricane, and second major hurricane of the 1999 Pacific hurricane season, (Note: A major hurricane is a storm that ranks as Category 3 or higher on the Saffir–Simpson hurricane wind scale.) Dora developed on August 6 from a tropical wave to the south of Mexico. Forming as a tropical depression, the system gradually strengthened and was upgraded to Tropical Storm Dora later that day. Thereafter Dora began heading in a steadily westward direction, before becoming a hurricane on August 8. Amid warm sea surface temperatures and low wind shear, the storm continued to intensify, eventually peaking as a 140 mph (220 km/h) Category 4 hurricane on August 12.

Thereafter, Dora fluctuated significantly in intensity due to changes in water temperatures and wind shear, with the storm ranging from peak intensity as a Category 4 hurricane to a low-end Category 1 hurricane over a period of four days. While passing well south of the island of Hawaii on August 16, Dora briefly regained major hurricane status. On August 18, the cyclone passed just south of Johnston Atoll as a Category 1 hurricane. Although it never made landfall, Dora produced high surf, gale-force winds, and light rain across the islands of Hawaii and Johnston Atoll, but resulted in minimal damage. While crossing the International Dateline on August 20, Dora weakened to a tropical storm. After weakening to a tropical depression on August 22, Dora dissipated on August 23 while centered several hundred miles north of Wake Island.

== Meteorological history ==
Map plotting the storm's track and intensity, according to the Saffir–Simpson scale Map key Saffir–Simpson scale Tropical depression (≤38 mph, ≤62 km/h) Tropical storm (39–73 mph, 63–118 km/h) Category 1 (74–95 mph, 119–153 km/h) Category 2 (96–110 mph, 154–177 km/h) Category 3 (111–129 mph, 178–208 km/h) Category 4 (130–156 mph, 209–251 km/h) Category 5 (≥157 mph, ≥252 km/h) Unknown Storm type Tropical cyclone Subtropical cyclone Extratropical cyclone, remnant low, tropical disturbance, or monsoon depression

A tropical wave emerged into the Atlantic Ocean from the west coast of Africa on July 23. It tracked through the Atlantic and Caribbean Sea for several days with minimal development. By August 4, the system entered the Pacific Ocean, accompanied by disorganized convection. During the next 24 hours, satellite imagery noted evidence of a low-level circulation, as well as the formation of curved convective banding. As a result, it is estimated that Tropical Depression Seven-E developed at 00:00 UTC on August 6, while located about 335 miles (540 km) south of Acapulco. Despite initial vertical wind shear, the depression steadily intensified and was upgraded to Tropical Storm Dora later that day. Upon becoming a tropical storm, the storm had decent outflow on its western quadrants. Tracking west-northwestward and then westward along a decaying subtropical ridge, Dora continued to intensify and was upgraded to a hurricane on August 8 based on the Dvorak technique.

Late on August 8, the storm consisted primarily of central dense overcast, but minimal banding features. At 00:00 UTC on August 9, Dora intensified into a Category 2 hurricane. Several hours later, an eye with a diameter of about 6–12 mi (10–19 km) developed, and the cyclone organized further. The storm strengthened into a Category 3 hurricane around 00:00 UTC on August 10. The hurricane continued westward or slightly north of due west. Late on August 10, deep convection significantly expanded and became more symmetric, while Dvorak intensity estimates indicated that Dora reached Category 4 intensity; the NHC upgraded the storm to a Category 4 hurricane accordingly.

Later on August 11, the NHC predicted relatively slow weakening beginning in about 24 hours, as the storm would cross over slightly colder sea surface temperatures in the wake of Hurricane Eugene. However, at 00:00 UTC on August 12, Dora attained its peak intensity with maximum sustained winds of 140 mph (220 km/h) and a minimum barometric pressure of 943 mbar (27.8 inHg). At the time of peak intensity, the hurricane featured a 17 mi (27 km) diameter eye, surrounded by cloud tops with temperatures of −85 to −94 °F (−65 to −70 °C). Six hours later, Dora weakened slightly due to an eyewall replacement cycle, but re-attained peak intensity by 12:00 UTC. The cyclone again fell below peak intensity at 12:00 UTC on August 13 due to cooler waters and increasing wind shear. Dora weakened to a Category 3 about six hours later, as the eye became cloud-filled and surrounding cloud tops warmed.

Early on August 14, the duty of hurricane advisories was transferred from the NHC to the Central Pacific Hurricane Center (CPHC), as the storm had crossed 140°W. By then, the system was weakening significantly and fell to Category 2 intensity around 06:00 UTC. The cyclone had maintained major hurricane status from 00:00 UTC on August 10 to 06:00 UTC on August 14 – more than 96 hours. Dora further deteriorated to a weak Category 1 hurricane by 12:00 UTC on August 14 and was forecast to fall to tropical storm intensity within 24 hours. However, dropsonde readings of 107 mph (172 km/h) winds and satellite estimates indicated that Dora re-strengthened to a Category 2 hurricane with winds of 105 mph (165 km/h) around 06:00 UTC on August 15. Shortly thereafter, a well-defined eye again appeared on satellite imagery.

The combination of reconnaissance data and satellite imagery supported an upgrade of the storm back to Category 3 intensity at 06:00 UTC on August 16. At the time, Dora was passing about 200 mi (320 km) south of Hawaii – the storm's closest approach to the state. The secondary peak intensity was brief, as weakening occurred shortly thereafter. Dora passed about 65 mi (105 km) south of Johnston Atoll on August 18 as a Category 1 hurricane before turning west-northwestward. Around 00:00 UTC on the following day, Dora weakened to a tropical storm as it crossed the International Date Line. The Joint Typhoon Warning Center tracked the remainder of the duration of Dora. The storm encountered stronger wind shear, and by August 21, winds decreased below tropical storm force. On August 23, the circulation became exposed from the main convection, and at 18:00 UTC, Tropical Depression Dora dissipated about 450 mi (725 km) northeast of Wake Island.

== Impact and records ==
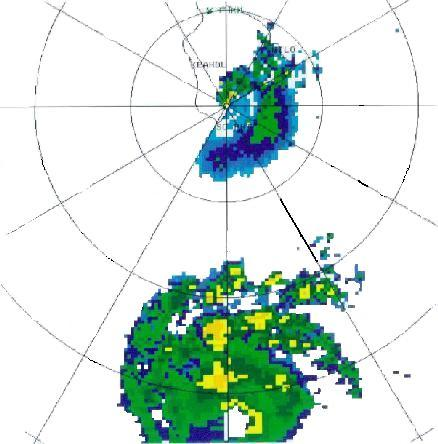
Radar image of Dora passing south of Hawaii.

On August 16, forecast models predicted Dora would bypass Johnston Atoll a short distance to the south, with some concerns of a direct hit on the island. As a result of the threat, about 1,200 workers and residents evacuated Johnston Atoll to Hawaii. Prior to leaving, workers secured construction equipment and other loose items. Some biologists on Johnston Atoll were concerned that the hurricane would severely impact the reproductive cycle of over 150,000 birds in the Johnston Atoll National Wildlife Refuge, a concern expressed after Hurricane John in 1994 killed 80% of the island's bird population.

An ocean swell from Dora produced 8–20 ft (2–6 m) waves along the east and southern shores of the island of Hawaii. This prompted local officials to close all beaches, campsites, and nature trails in the Puna and Kau districts due to the deteriorating conditions. The outer bands of Dora produced winds of up to 60 mph (95 km/h) at some high elevations. Light rains fell, especially in the northern and eastern portions of the island, with amounts ranging from 0.5 to 1.5 in (13 to 38 mm). Hurricane Dora also produced rough surf on Johnston Atoll. The automatic station at Johnston Atoll reported wind gusts between 40–45 mph (65–75 km/h) for two hours.

With a total track of about 6,500 mi (10,500 km), Hurricane Dora had the second longest track of a Pacific hurricane, behind only Hurricane John of 1994; the length of the track of Dora was more than four times the basin average. Dora was also the first Pacific hurricane to come close enough to be detected by radar. In addition, the hurricane was the first tropical cyclone to move across all three Pacific basins since John in 1994.

== See also ==
- Other tropical cyclones of the same name
- Hurricane Fico (1978)
- Hurricane Tina (1992)
- Hurricane John (1994) – the second longest-lived and furthest-traveling tropical cyclone ever recorded.
- Hurricane Genevieve (2014)
- Hurricane Hector (2018)
- Hurricane Dora (2023) - category 4 hurricane with the same name and similar intensity that also crossed the International Date Line, was an indirect cause of the 2023 Hawaii wildfires
- List of Category 4 Pacific hurricanes
