= Hurricane Greg (1999) =

Category 1 Pacific hurricane in 1999

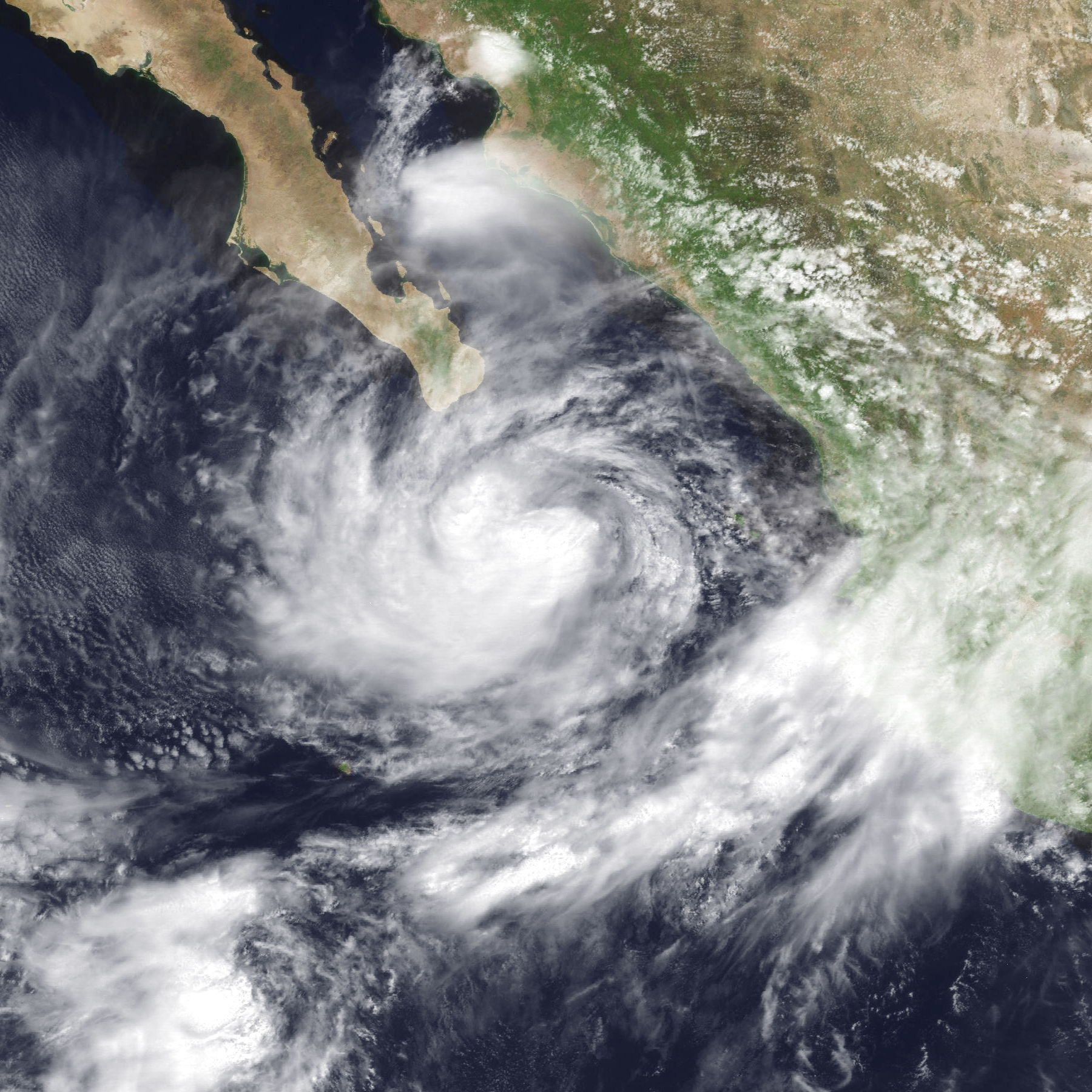
- Hurricane Greg near peak intensity south of the Baja Peninsula on September 6

Meteorological history
- Formed: September 5, 1999
- Dissipated: September 9, 1999

Category 1 hurricane
- 1-minute sustained (SSHWS/NWS)
- Highest winds: 75 mph (120 km/h)
- Lowest pressure: 986 mbar (hPa); 29.12 inHg

Overall effects
- Fatalities: 10 total
- Damage: Moderate
- Areas affected: Western Mexico, Baja California Peninsula
- IBTrACS
- Part of the 1999 Pacific hurricane season

Hurricane Greg was the only eastern Pacific tropical cyclone in 1999 to make a direct landfall. Part of the annual hurricane season, Greg originated from a tropical wave that departed Africa in mid-August. The wave entered the eastern Pacific by September 1, steadily organizing over subsequent days to become a tropical depression on September 5. Amid a favorable environment, the cyclone intensified into Tropical Storm Greg a few hours after formation and further organized into a Category 1 hurricane on September 6. Greg paralleled the southwestern coastline of Mexico, where it destroyed over 250 homes, cut-off roads, killed 10 people, and left at least 4,000 more injured. The storm weakened to tropical storm intensity as it moved ashore Baja California Sur, although rain was generally beneficial there. Succumbing to cooler waters and high wind shear, Greg ultimately dissipated over the Pacific on September 9. Its remnants led to thunderstorms across northern California, with only minor impacts.

== Meteorological history ==
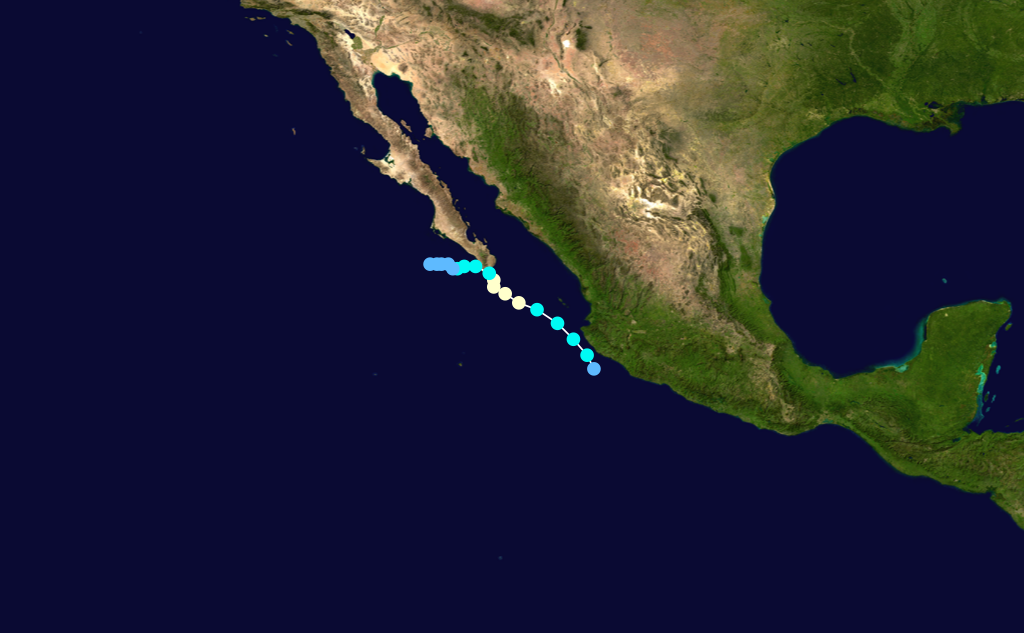
Map plotting the storm's track and intensity, according to the Saffir–Simpson scale Map key Saffir–Simpson scale Tropical depression (≤38 mph, ≤62 km/h) Tropical storm (39–73 mph, 63–118 km/h) Category 1 (74–95 mph, 119–153 km/h) Category 2 (96–110 mph, 154–177 km/h) Category 3 (111–129 mph, 178–208 km/h) Category 4 (130–156 mph, 209–251 km/h) Category 5 (≥157 mph, ≥252 km/h) Unknown Storm type Tropical cyclone Subtropical cyclone Extratropical cyclone, remnant low, tropical disturbance, or monsoon depression

In mid-August, a tropical wave emerged off the western coast of Africa. The northern portion of the wave led to the formation of Tropical Storm Emily in the Atlantic, while the southern portion of the wave continued westward. It crossed Central America on August 31 and September 1, characterized by a large area of convection and a mid-level circulation. The disturbance traversed southern Mexico before emerging offshore, where it began to interact with a broad area of low pressure that existed in the eastern Pacific for several days prior. Shower and thunderstorm activity became concentrated about a well-defined center, leading to the formation of a tropical depression near Manzanillo, Mexico by 12:00 UTC on September 5. A portion of the tropical wave also combined with monsoonal-like flow across the Bay of Campeche to form Tropical Depression Seven in the Atlantic.

Steered northwest by an anticyclone over northern Mexico and a developing upper-level low west of Southern California, the nascent cyclone steadily organized over warm waters. A ship about 105 mi (165 km) from the center reported sustained winds of 48 mph (77 km/h), supporting an upgrade to Tropical Storm Greg by 18:00 UTC on September 5. In spite of dissipating banding features, a large mass of extremely deep convection developed near the center that night. Radar out of Los Cabos indicated that an eye was in the process of forming by early on September 6, and Greg was upgraded to a Category 1 hurricane in conjunction with satellite intensity estimates by 18:00 UTC that day. Six hours later, the storm attained its peak intensity with maximum sustained winds of 75 mph (120 km/h) and a minimum barometric pressure of 986 mbar (hPa; 29.12 inHg). Greg maintained its status for many more hours, even though outflow became restricted to the northeast and low-level cloud lines near the storm's eye became exposed.

A band of convection formed northeast of Greg early on September 7, inducing moderate to strong northeasterly wind shear on the cyclone. Combined with land interaction, the storm weakened to tropical storm intensity by 18:00 UTC that day, and Greg made landfall near Cabo San Lucas three hours later, with winds of 60 mph (95 km/h). After turning west-northwest and then west, the cyclone moved over progressively cooler waters and continued to lose strength, although a small area of deep convection persisted. Greg weakened to a tropical depression by 18:00 UTC on September 8 before succumbing to the unfavorable environment and dissipating a day later west of Baja California Sur.

== Preparations, impact, and aftermath ==
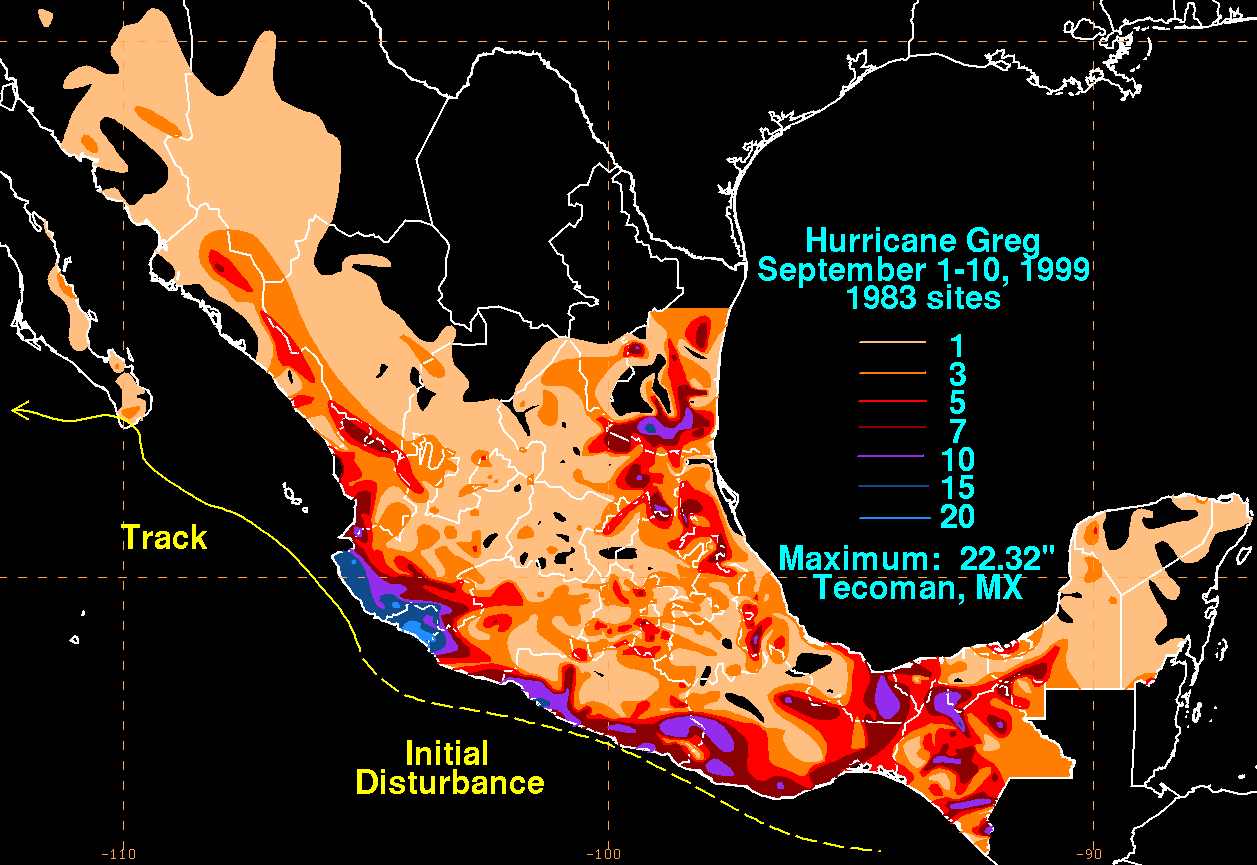
Rainfall map

Following Greg's formation, a tropical storm warning was issued for the coast of Mexico from Manzanillo, Colima to Cabo Corrientes, Jalisco, including Islas Marías. The warning was extended to include Lázaro Cárdenas a few hours later. On September 6, a tropical storm warning was issued for locations south of La Paz on the east coast of Baja California, while a tropical storm watch was hoisted for areas south of Punta Abreojos on the west coast. A tropical storm warning was then issued for the west coast of Baja California south of Cabo San Lázaro. As Greg intensified, a hurricane warning was raised from Arroyo Seco southward, and for the east coast of Baja California from La Paz southward. A tropical storm watch was raised from north of La Paz to Loreto. Late on September 7, the hurricane warning was reduced to a tropical storm warning as Greg weakened. The watches and warnings were lifted from the east coast of Baja California early on September 8, and they were subsequently lifted for all areas a few hours later.

In Acapulco, which had already suffered severe damage due to a harsh rainy season, residents piled sandbags in preparation for more precipitation. Ten shipping ports were closed. Over 240 people were evacuated in the state of Jalisco, 140 of which from the village of La Huerta. In addition, up to 850 people sought refuge in shelters across the state. Some 350 people from the municipality of Coahuayana and 150 people from the city of Coalcomán de Vázquez Pallares – both in Michoacán state – were moved to safety. Merchants taped their store windows to protect them from strong winds while residents stocked up on water. In Cabo San Lucas on the southern tip of Baja California, authorities began evacuating low-lying areas as residents and tourists flooded supermarkets. Gas stations were filled with lines up to 0.5 mi (0.8 km) long. All traffic was closed to the ports of Cabo San Lucas and San José del Cabo. The Red Cross opened shelters at several local schools. Municipal authorities issued a red alert. Army and Navy representatives met to discuss rescue operations. About 1,000 people sought refuge in shelters across Cabo San Lucas and nearby San Jose del Cabo as the storm arrived. Most airline flights were canceled, frustrating tourists.

As Greg passed offshore southwestern Mexico, its outer bands affected coastal locations. Coahuayana saw at least three villages and 200 homes flooded after a river overflowed its banks, while a stretch of highway connecting Acapulco to Zihuatanejo was washed out. Some minor flooding was reported in Acapulco. In the state of Oaxaca, mudslides were observed and at least 50 families had to be evacuated after the Perros River overflowed its banks. Around 800 people were evacuated across the state of Colima, where a storm-total rain amount of 22.32 in (567 mm) fell in Tecomán. Water systems in Manzanillo were damaged. Widespread flooding was observed, with water up to 7 ft (2 m) in some locations. In Jalisco, at least 8,000 residents were cut-off from the rest of the state, and up to 90% of the farmland near the municipalities of Autlán, Cihuatlán, and Casimiro Castillo was inundated as at least eight rivers overflowed. Up to 250 dwellings were destroyed across southwestern portions of Mexico. Over 4,000 additional people were injured, while up to 500 heads of cattle died in floodwaters. In Chiapas, dams exceeded 9 ft (3 m) their normal levels and other water systems were pushed past their intended usage due to the already severe rainy season. A state of emergency was declared in six states. Across the Baja California peninsula, shacks and hotels were filled with water, even as the rainfall was generally regarded as beneficial. In the aftermath of the cyclone, army jeeps transported supplies to flooded homes. At least 10 people were killed, including six deaths in Morelos, two deaths in Colima, and one death each in Chiapas and Michoacán. The remnants of Greg swept into northern California by September 8, producing more lightning activity than the region had experienced in at least two decades, as well as damaging a house after a tree struck by lightning fell on it. The thunderstorms downed power poles, cutting power to 55,000 residents, and sparked four wildfires across Monterey County. Some locations received up to 0.25 in (6.4 mm) of rain.

== See also ==
- 1999 Pacific hurricane season
- October 1999 Mexico floods
- List of California hurricanes
