= Timeline of the 1999 Atlantic hurricane season =

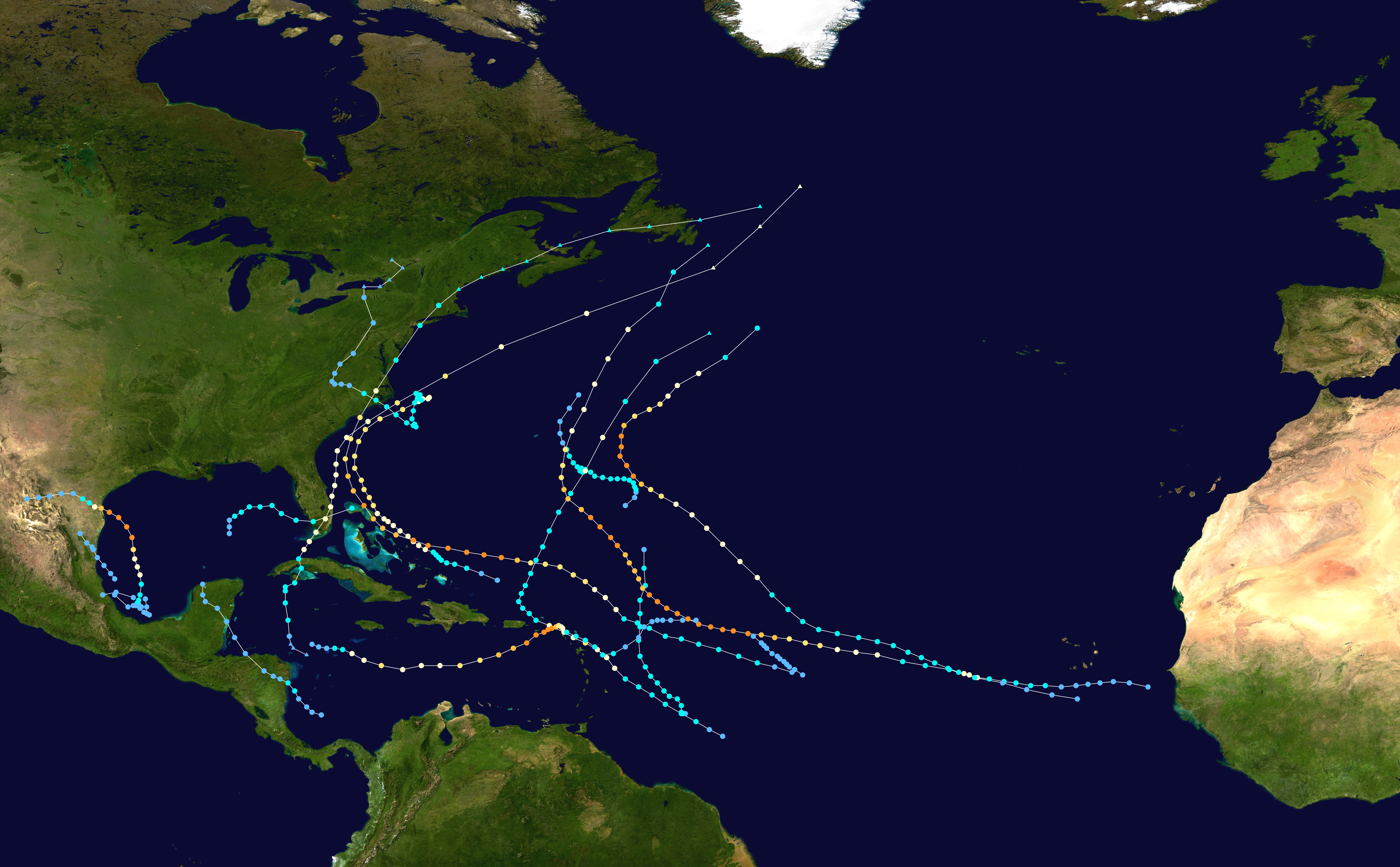
- Season summary map

Season boundaries
- First system formed: June 11, 1999
- Last system dissipated: November 23, 1999

Strongest system
- Name: Floyd
- Maximum winds: 155 mph (250 km/h) (1-minute sustained)
- Lowest pressure: 921 mbar (hPa; 27.2 inHg)

Longest lasting system
- Name: Dennis
- Duration: 14.75 days
Storm articles
- Hurricane Bret
- Hurricane Dennis (1999)
- Hurricane Floyd
- Hurricane Gert (1999)
- Tropical Storm Harvey (1999)
- Hurricane Irene (1999)
- Hurricane Jose (1999)
- Hurricane Lenny

The 1999 Atlantic hurricane season was the annual cycle of tropical cyclone formation over the Atlantic Ocean north of the equator. The season officially began on June 1 and ended on November 30. This is historically the period during which most subtropical or tropical cyclogenesis occurs over the Atlantic Ocean. Twelve named tropical storms developed, which is near average; (Note: An average Atlantic hurricane season, as defined by the National Oceanic and Atmospheric Administration, has 12 tropical storms, six hurricanes and two major hurricanes.) eight became hurricanes, of which five further intensified into major hurricanes. (Note: Hurricanes reaching Category 3 (111 miles per hour (179 km/h)) and higher on the 5-level Saffir–Simpson wind speed scale are considered major hurricanes.) All five major hurricanes attained Category 4 intensity on the five-level Saffir–Simpson scale, setting a new record for the most in one season. There were also four tropical depressions that did not reach tropical storm strength. The season's first storm, Tropical Storm Arlene, formed on June 11, while its last, Hurricane Lenny, dissipated on November 23.

The most significant hurricane of the season was Hurricane Floyd, which caused devastating flooding along the East Coast of the United States. North Carolina, which had been hit only ten days earlier by Hurricane Dennis, experienced the worst impacts. Hurricane Lenny became the one of the strongest November Atlantic tropical cyclones on record, and maintained a west-to-east track through the Caribbean for nearly its entire duration. Because of its unusual path, it developed the nickname "Wrong Way Lenny." The deadliest tropical cyclone of the season was Tropical Depression Eleven, whose heavy rain and resultant flooding caused 400 deaths in Mexico.

This timeline documents tropical cyclone formations, strengthening, weakening, landfalls, extratropical transitions, and dissipations during the season. It includes information that was not released throughout the season, meaning that data from post-storm reviews by the National Hurricane Center, such as a storm that was not initially warned upon, has been included.

The time stamp for each event is first stated using Coordinated Universal Time (UTC), the 24-hour clock where 00:00 = midnight UTC. The NHC uses both UTC and the time zone where the center of the tropical cyclone is currently located. The time zones utilized (east to west) prior to 2020 were: Atlantic, Eastern, and Central. In this timeline, the respective area time is included in parentheses. Additionally, figures for maximum sustained winds and position estimates are rounded to the nearest 5 units (miles, or kilometers), following National Hurricane Center practice. Direct wind observations are rounded to the nearest whole number. Atmospheric pressures are listed to the nearest millibar and nearest hundredth of an inch of mercury.

== Timeline ==
=== June ===
June 1

- The 1999 Atlantic hurricane season officially begins.

June 11

- 18:00 UTC (2:00 p.m. AST) at 27.1°N 58.1°W – Tropical Depression One forms from an interaction between a tropical wave and a cold-core low about 535 mi (860 km) southeast of Bermuda.

June 12

- 12:00 UTC (8:00 a.m. AST) at 28.3°N 57.3°W – Tropical Depression One strengthens into Tropical Storm Arlene about 525 mi (845 km) east-southeast of Bermuda.

June 13

Tropical Storm Arlene near peak intensity on June 13

- 06:00 UTC (2:00 a.m. AST) at 28.8°N 57.5°W – Tropical Storm Arlene attains its peak intensity, with maximum sustained winds of 60 mph (95 km/h) and a minimum central pressure of 1006 mbar (29.71 inHg), about 495 mi (795 km) east-southeast of Bermuda. (Note: The figures for maximum sustained winds and position estimates are rounded to the nearest 5 units (knots, miles, or kilometers), following the convention used in the National Hurricane Center's operational products for each storm. All other units are rounded to the nearest digit.)

June 17

- 00:00 UTC (8:00 p.m. AST, June 16) at 31.8°N 62.8°W – Tropical Storm Arlene weakens into a tropical depression about 120 mi (195 km) east-southeast of Bermuda.

June 18

- 00:00 UTC (8:00 p.m. AST, June 17) at 35.4°N 61.6°W – Tropical Depression Arlene is last noted as a tropical cyclone about 275 mi (445 km) northeast of Bermuda, dissipating shortly thereafter.

=== July ===
July 2

- 18:00 UTC (1:00 p.m. CDT) at 20.2°N 95.0°W – Tropical Depression Two forms from a tropical wave over the western Bay of Campeche, about 160 mi (260 km) east-southeast of Tuxpan, Veracruz.

July 3

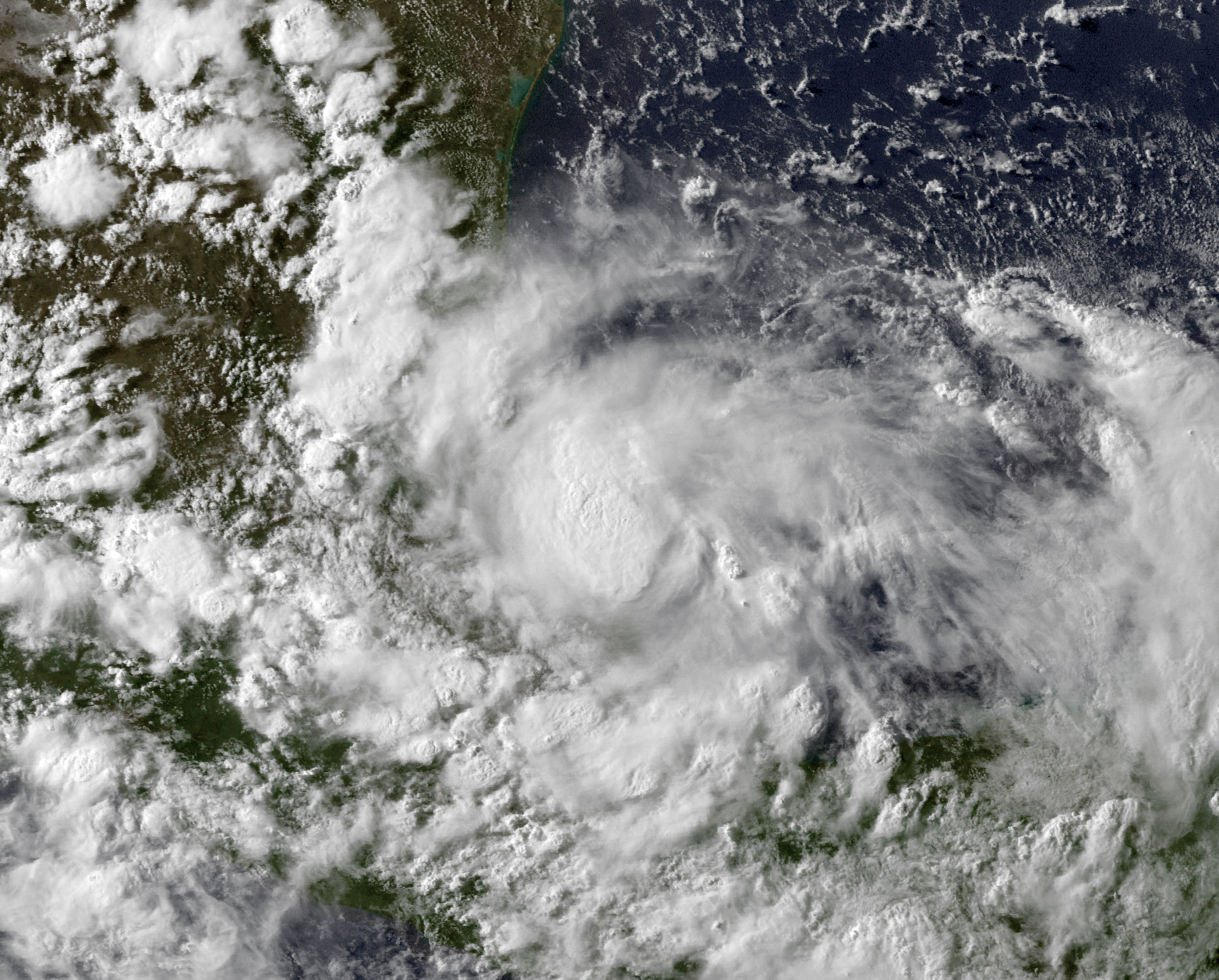
Tropical Depression Two approacing the coast of Mexico on July 3

- 00:00 UTC (7:00 p.m. CDT, July 2) at 20.6°N 96.3°W – Tropical Depression Two attains its peak intensity, with maximum sustained winds of 35 mph (55 km/h) and a minimum central pressure of 1004 mbar (29.65 inHg), about 75 mi (120 km) east-southeast of Tuxpan.
- 04:00 UTC (11:00 p.m. CDT, July 2) at 20.5°N 97.0°W – Tropical Depression Two makes landfall near Tecolutla, Veracruz, or about 40 mi (65 km) southeast of Tuxpan, at its peak intensity.
- 06:00 UTC (1:00 a.m. CDT) at 20.4°N 97.3°W – Tropical Depression Two is last noted as a tropical cyclone inland about 40 mi (65 km) south of Tuxpan, dissipating over the Sierra Madre Oriental shortly thereafter.

=== August ===
August 18

- 18:00 UTC (1:00 p.m. CDT) at 19.5°N 94.4°W – Tropical Depression Three forms from an interaction between a tropical wave and an upper-level low over the Bay of Campeche, about 90 mi (150 km) north of Coatzacoalcos, Veracruz.

August 19

- 00:00 UTC (8:00 p.m. AST, August 18) at 13.5°N 18.9°W – Tropical Depression Four forms from a tropical wave about 345 miles (555 km) east-southeast of Cape Verde.
- 18:00 UTC (1:00 p.m. CDT) at 19.8°N 94.7°W – Tropical Depression Three strengthens into Tropical Storm Bret about 115 mi (185 km) north of Coatzacoalcos.

August 20

- 18:00 UTC (2:00 p.m. AST) at 13.6°N 26.6°W – Tropical Depression Four strengthens into Tropical Storm Cindy about 225 mi (360 km) west-southwest of Cape Verde.

August 21

- 00:00 UTC (7:00 p.m. CDT, August 20) at 21.9°N 94.5°W – Tropical Storm Bret strengthens into a Category 1 hurricane on the Saffir–Simpson scale about 220 mi (350 km) east of Tampico, Tamaulipas.
- 18:00 UTC (1:00 p.m. CDT) at 23.8°N 95.0°W – Hurricane Bret strengthens to Category 2 intensity about 180 mi (285 km) east of La Pesca, Tamaulipas.

August 22

- 00:00 UTC (7:00 p.m. CDT, August 21) at 24.7°N 95.1°W – Hurricane Bret rapidly strengthens to Category 4 intensity about 175 mi (280 km) east-southeast of Brownsville, Texas.
- 00:00 UTC (8:00 p.m. AST, August 21) at 14.2°N 31.7°W – Tropical Storm Cindy strengthens into a Category 1 hurricane about 540 mi (870 km) west of Cape Verde.
- 12:00 UTC (7:00 a.m. CDT) at 26.2°N 96.1°W – Hurricane Bret attains its peak intensity, with maximum sustained winds of 145 mph (230 km/h) and a minimum central pressure of 944 mbar (27.88 inHg), about 85 mi (140 km) east-northeast of Brownsville.
- 18:00 UTC (2:00 p.m. AST) at 14.6°N 33.1°W – Hurricane Cindy weakens into a tropical storm about 625 mi (1,010 km) west of Cape Verde.

August 23

Radar image of Hurricane making landfall in Texas early on August 23

- 00:00 UTC (7:00 p.m. CDT, August 22)26.9°N 97.4°W – Hurricane Bret weakens to Category 3 intensity as it makes landfall on Padre Island, Texas, with maximum sustained winds of 115 mph (185 km/h) and a central pressure of 951 mbar (28.08 inHg).
- 06:00 UTC (1:00 a.m. CDT) at 27.0°N 97.9°W – Hurricane Bret rapidly weakens to Category 1 intensity inland about 80 mi (130 km) north-northwest of Brownsville.
- 12:00 UTC (7:00 a.m. CDT) at 27.3°N 98.3°W – Hurricane Bret weakens into a tropical storm inland about 110 mi (175 km) north-northwest of Brownsville.

August 24

- 00:00 UTC (7:00 p.m. CDT, August 23) at 28.0°N 99.5°W – Tropical Storm Bret weakens into a tropical depression inland about 35 mi (55 km) north of Laredo, Texas.
- 00:00 UTC (8:00 p.m. EDT, August 23) at 21.5°N 67.7°W – Tropical Depression Five forms from a tropical wave about 220 mi (350 km) east of Grand Turk Island.
- 06:00 UTC (2:00 a.m. AST) at 11.5°N 53.6°W – The sixth tropical depression of the season forms from a tropical wave about 420 mi (675 km) east-southeast of Barbados.
- 12:00 UTC (8:00 a.m. EDT) at 22.4°N 70.0°W – Tropical Depression Five strengthens into Tropical Storm Dennis about 100 mi (155 km) northeast of Grand Turk Island.
- 12:00 UTC (8:00 a.m. AST) at 11.5°N 53.8°W – The sixth tropical depression of the season strengthens into Tropical Storm Emily about 405 mi (650 km) east-southeast of Barbados.
- 18:00 UTC (2:00 p.m. AST) at 11.6°N 53.9°W – Tropical Storm Emily attains its peak intensity, with maximum sustained winds of 50 mph (85 km/h) and a minimum central pressure of 1004 mbar (29.65 inHg), about 395 mi (640 km) east-southeast of Barbados.

August 25

- 00:00 UTC (7:00 p.m. CDT, August 24) at 27.6°N 103.0°W – Tropical Depression Bret is last noted as a tropical cyclone inland over the mountainous terrain of northern Mexico, about 215 mi (345 km) west of Laredo, and later dissipates.

August 26

- 00:00 UTC (8:00 p.m. AST, August 25) at 21.7°N 48.2°W – Tropical Storm Cindy restrengthens into a Category 1 hurricane about 1,250 mi (2,010 km) southeast of Bermuda.
- 06:00 UTC (2:00 a.m. EDT) at 23.8°N 73.1°W – Tropical Storm Dennis strengthens into a Category 1 hurricane about 200 mi (325 km) northwest of Grand Turk Island.

August 27

- 12:00 UTC (8:00 a.m. AST) at 27.8°N 55.4°W – Hurricane Cindy strengthens to Category 2 intensity about 640 mi (1,030 km) east-southeast of Bermuda.

August 28

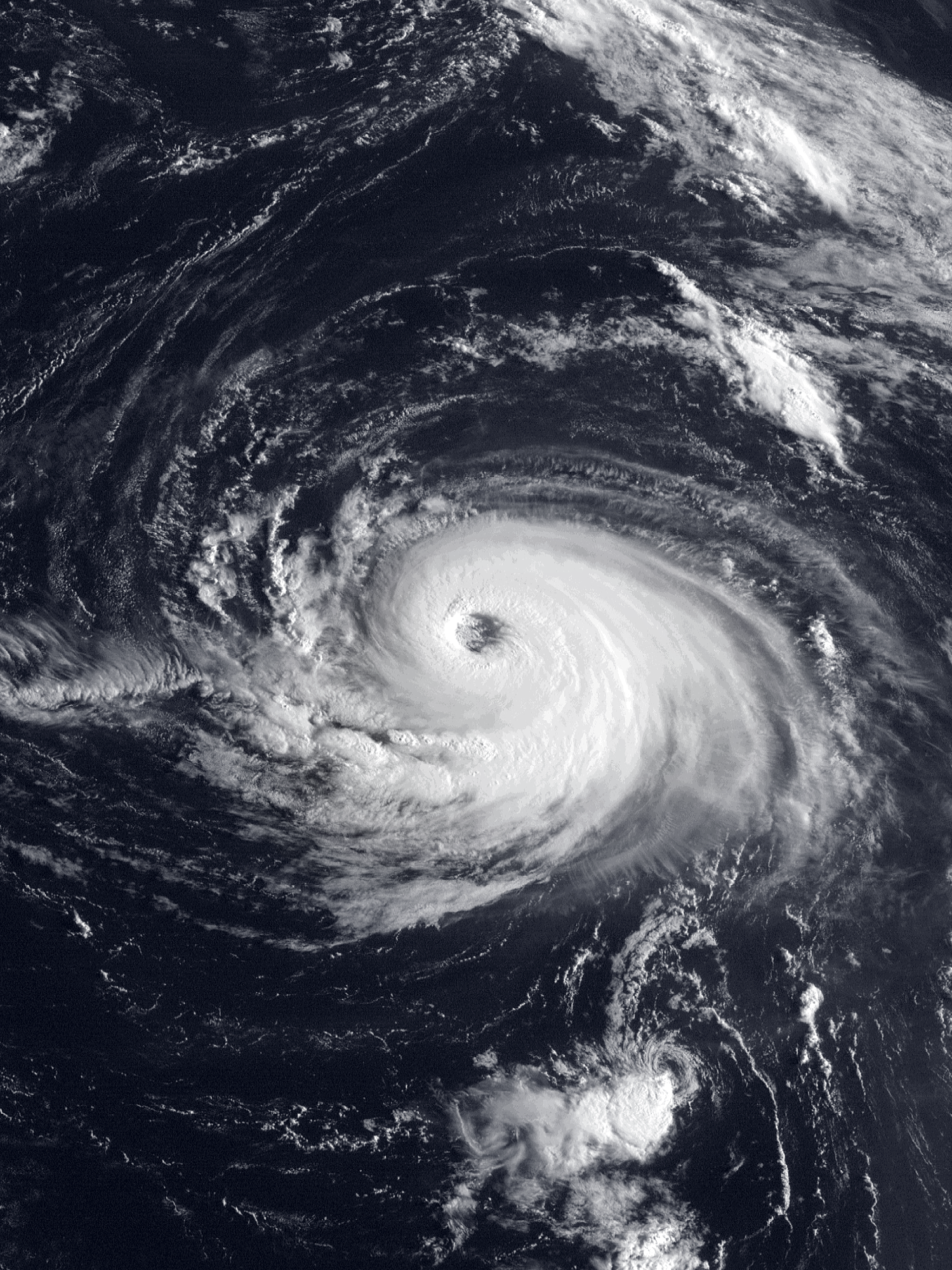
Hurricane Cindy at peak intensity on August 28; Tropical Storm Emily, about to be absorbed, can be seen to the south

- 00:00 UTC (8:00 p.m. AST, August 27) at 28.7°N 56.9°W – Hurricane Cindy strengthens to Category 3 intensity about 530 mi (850 km) east-southeast of Bermuda.
- 06:00 UTC (2:00 a.m. AST) at 29.3°N 57.5°W – Hurricane Cindy strengthens to Category 4 intensity about 480 mi (770 km) east-southeast of Bermuda.
- 07:00 UTC (3:00 a.m. EDT) at 26.6°N 76.8°W – Hurricane Dennis makes its first landfall over the Abaco Islands with maximum sustained winds of 85 mph (140 km/h) and a central pressure of 976 mbar (28.82 inHg).
- 12:00 UTC (8:00 a.m. AST) at 30.1°N 58.0°W – Hurricane Cindy attains its peak intensity, with maximum sustained winds of 140 mph (220 km/h) and a minimum central pressure of 942 mbar (27.82 inHg), about 425 mi (685 km) east-southeast of Bermuda.
- 12:00 UTC (8:00 a.m. EDT) at 27.1°N 77.0°W – Hurricane Dennis strengthens to Category 2 intensity about 45 mi (75 km) north of the Abaco Islands.
- 12:00 UTC (8:00 a.m. AST) at 23.8°N 56.7°W – Tropical Storm Emily weakens into a tropical depression about 760 mi (1,220 km) north-northeast of Barbados, and dissipates shortly thereafter when it is absorbed by Hurricane Cindy.

August 29

- 12:00 UTC (8:00 a.m. AST) at 33.1°N 58.2°W – Hurricane Cindy weakens to Category 3 intensity about 385 mi (620 km) east of Bermuda.
- 18:00 UTC (2:00 p.m. AST) at 33.8°N 57.4°W – Hurricane Cindy weakens to Category 2 intensity about 435 mi (705 km) east of Bermuda.

August 30

- 06:00 UTC (2:00 a.m. EDT) at 32.8°N 77.6°W – Hurricane Dennis attains its peak intensity, with maximum sustained winds of 105 mph (165 km/h) and a minimum central pressure of 962 mbar (28.41 inHg), about 100 mi (155 km) south of Wilmington, North Carolina.
- 12:00 UTC (8:00 a.m. AST) at 35.3°N 54.9°W – Hurricane Cindy weakens to Category 1 intensity about 600 mi (965 km) east-northeast of Bermuda.

August 31

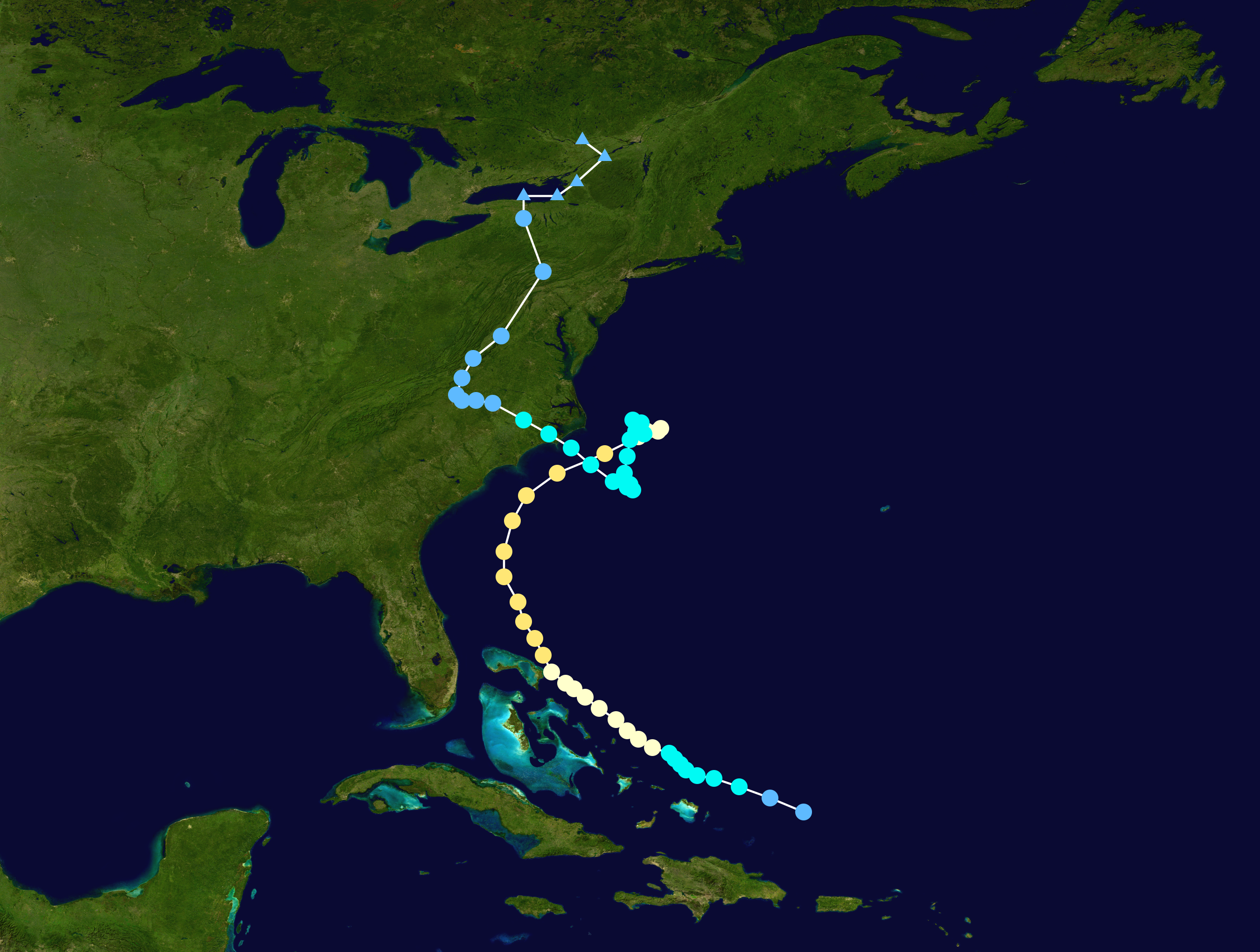
The erratic storm path of Hurricane Dennis

- 00:00 UTC (8:00 p.m. EDT, August 30) at 34.9°N 73.6°W – Hurricane Dennis weakens to Category 1 intensity about 110 mi (175 km) east of Cape Hatteras, North Carolina.
- 06:00 UTC (2:00 a.m. AST) at 38.2°N 50.6°W – Hurricane Cindy weakens into a tropical storm about 890 mi (1,435 km) east-northeast of Bermuda.
- 12:00 UTC (8:00 a.m. AST) at 40.4°N 48.2°W – Tropical Storm Cindy is last noted as a tropical cyclone about 1,075 mi (1,730 km) west of the Azores, and is absorbed by an extratropical cyclone shortly thereafter.

=== September ===
September 1

- 00:00 UTC (8:00 p.m. EDT, August 31) at 35.2°N 73.6°W – Hurricane Dennis weakens into a tropical storm about 110 mi (175 km) east of Cape Hatteras.

September 4

- 21:00 UTC (5:00 p.m. EDT) at 34.8°N 76.5°W – Tropical Storm Dennis makes its second and final landfall near Cape Lookout National Seashore in North Carolina, with maximum sustained winds of 70 mph (110 km/h) and a central pressure of 984 mbar (29.06 inHg).

September 5

- 12:00 UTC (8:00 a.m. EDT) at 36.1°N 78.8°W – Tropical Storm Dennis weakens into a tropical depression inland, about 140 mi (220 km) north-northwest of Wilmington.
- 18:00 UTC (1:00 p.m. CDT) at 21.6°N 96.4°W – Tropical Depression Seven forms from a monsoon-like disturbance about 105 mi (165 km) east-southeast of Tampico.

September 6

Tropical Depression Seven shortly after landfall on September 6

- 00:00 UTC (7:00 p.m. CDT, September 5) at 22.0°N 96.7°W – Tropical Depression Seven attains its peak intensity, with maximum sustained winds of 35 mph (55 km/h) and a minimum central pressure of 1006 mbar (29.71 inHg), about 75 mi (120 km) east-southeast of Tampico.
- 12:00 UTC (7:00 a.m. CDT) at 23.2°N 97.7°W – Tropical Depresson Seven makes landfall about 40 mi (65 km) south of La Pesca at its peak intensity.

September 7

- 12:00 UTC (7:00 a.m. CDT) at 25.0°N 99.0°W – Tropical Depression Seven is last noted as a tropical cyclone inland, about 115 mi (185 km) northwest of La Pesca, dissipating shortly thereafter.
- 18:00 UTC (2:00 p.m. EDT) at 43.5°N 77.7°W – Tropical Depression Dennis transitions into an extratropical cyclone inland, about 160 mi (260 km) north-northwest of Williamsport, Pennsylvania, and later dissipates.
- 18:00 UTC (1:00 p.m. AST) at 14.6°N 45.6°W – Tropical Depression Eight forms from a tropical wave about 940 mi (1,510 km) east of Barbados.

September 8

- 06:00 UTC (2:00 a.m. AST) at 15.3°N 48.2°W – Tropical Depression Eight strengthens into Tropical Storm Floyd about 770 mi (1,240 km) east of Barbados.

September 10

- 12:00 UTC (8:00 a.m. AST) at 19.3°N 58.8°W – Tropical Storm Floyd strengthens into a Category 1 hurricane about 230 mi (370 km) east-northeast of Barbuda.

September 11

- 06:00 UTC (2:00 a.m. AST) at 21.4°N 61.1°W – Hurricane Floyd strengthens to Category 2 intensity about 265 mi (425 km) north of Barbuda.
- 12:00 UTC (8:00 a.m. AST) at 12.6°N 24.2°W – Tropical Depression Nine forms from a tropical wave about 190 mi (305 km) south of Cape Verde.

September 12

- 12:00 UTC (8:00 a.m. EDT) at 23.0°N 66.2°W – Hurricane Floyd strengthens to Category 3 intensity about 315 mi (510 km) north of San Juan, Puerto Rico.
- 12:00 UTC (8:00 a.m. AST) at 14.2°N 31.9°W – Tropical Depression Nine strengthens into Tropical Storm Gert about 550 mi (890 km) west of Cape Verde.
- 18:00 UTC (2:00 p.m. EDT) at 23.2°N 67.4°W – Hurricane Floyd strengthens to Category 4 intensity about 265 mi (425 km) east-northeast of Grand Turk Island.

September 13

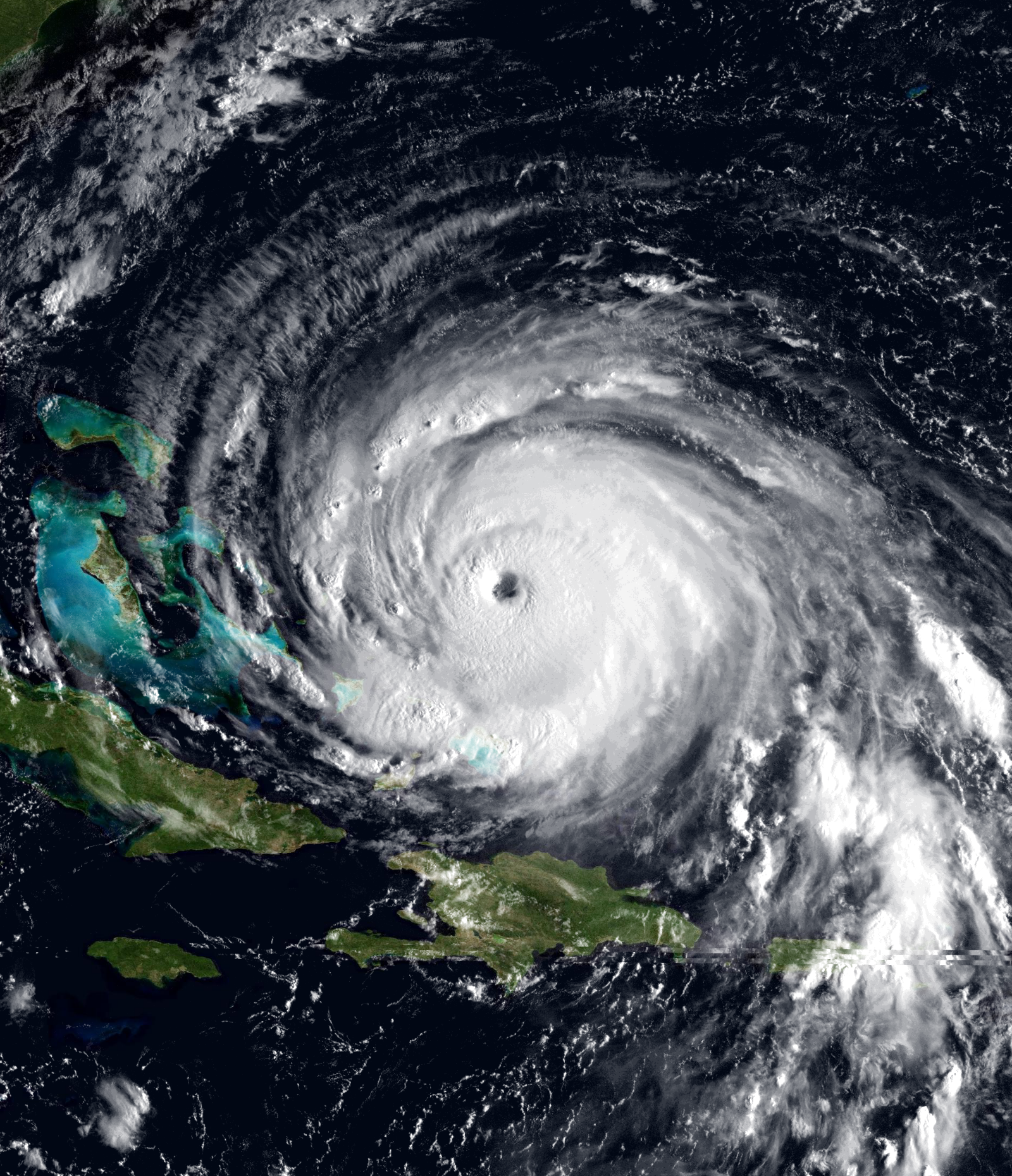
Hurricane Floyd at peak intensity on September 13

- 12:00 UTC (8:00 a.m. EDT) at 23.9°N 71.4°W – Hurricane Floyd attains its peak intensity, with maximum sustained winds of 155 mph (250 km/h) and a minimum central pressure of 921 mbar (27.20 inHg), about 165 mi (270 km) north of Grand Turk Island, making it the strongest storm of the season.
- 12:00 UTC (8:00 a.m. AST) at 15.9°N 39.2°W – Tropical Storm Gert strengthens into a Category 1 hurricane about 1,030 mi (1,660 km) west of Cape Verde.

September 14

- 06:00 UTC (2:00 a.m. EDT) at 24.9°N 75.3°W – Hurricane Floyd weakens to Category 3 intensity about 50 mi (85 km) east of the Bahamian island of Eleuthera.
- 06:00 UTC (2:00 a.m. AST) at 16.6°N 43.5°W – Hurricane Gert strengthens to Category 2 intensity about 1,320 mi (2,120 km) west of Cape Verde.
- 12:00 UTC (8:00 a.m. EDT) at 25.4°N 76.3°W – Hurricane Floyd makes its first landfall near Alice Town, Eleuthera, with maximum sustained winds of 120 mph (195 km/h) and a central pressure of 930 mbar (27.46 inHg).
- 19:00 UTC (3:00 p.m. EDT) at 26.3°N 77.1°W – Hurricane Floyd restrengthens to Category 4 intensity as it makes its second landfall near Cherokee Sound on the Bahamian island of Great Abaco with maximum sustained winds of 140 mph (220 km/h) and a central pressure of 932 mbar (27.52 inHg).

September 15

- 00:00 UTC (8:00 p.m. AST, September 14) at 17.2°N 46.9°W – Hurricane Gert strengthens to Category 3 intensity about 985 mi (1,585 km) east of Barbados.
- 06:00 UTC (2:00 a.m. EDT) at 28.2°N 78.5°W – Hurricane Floyd weakens back to Category 3 intensity about 125 mi (205 km) east of Cape Canaveral, Florida.
- 12:00 UTC (8:00 a.m. AST) at 17.5°N 48.9°W – Hurricane Gert strengthens to Category 4 intensity about 850 mi (1,370 km) east of Barbados.
- 18:00 UTC (2:00 a.m. EDT) at 30.6°N 79.1°W – Hurricane Floyd weakens to Category 2 intensity about 180 mi (285 km) north-northeast of Cape Canaveral.

September 16

Infrared satellite image of Hurricane Gert near peak intensity early on September 16

- 00:00 UTC (8:00 p.m. AST, September 15) at 17.8°N 50.8°W – Hurricane Gert attains its peak intensity, with maximum sustained winds of 150 mph (240 km/h) and a minimum central pressure of 930 mbar (27.46 inHg), about 725 mi (1,165 km) east of Barbados.
- 06:30 UTC (2:30 a.m. EDT) at 33.8°N 78.0°W – Hurricane Floyd makes its third and final landfall near Cape Fear, North Carolina, with maximum sustained winds of 105 mph (165 km/h) and a central pressure of 956 mbar (28.23 inHg).
- 12:00 UTC (8:00 a.m. EDT) at 35.7°N 76.8°W – Hurricane Floyd weakens to Category 1 intensity inland about 15 mi (30 km) northeast of Washington, North Carolina.
- 18:00 UTC (2:00 p.m. EDT) at 38.0°N 75.3°W – Hurricane Floyd weakens into a tropical storm inland near Chincoteague, Virginia.

September 17

- 12:00 UTC (8:00 a.m. EDT) at 43.3°N 70.6°W – Tropical Storm Floyd transitions into an extratropical cyclone just inland from the coast of Maine, or about 50 mi (85 km) northeast of Lawrence, Massachusetts, and later merges with a larger extratropical cyclone over the northern Atlantic Ocean.

September 18

- 00:00 UTC (8:00 p.m. AST, September 17) at 20.9°N 56.8°W – Hurricane Gert weakens to Category 3 intensity about 390 mi (630 km) northeast of Barbuda.

September 19

- 06:00 UTC (2:00 a.m. AST) at 24.1°N 58.7°W – Hurricane Gert restrengthens to Category 4 intensity about 490 mi (785 km) north-northeast of Barbuda.
- 06:00 UTC (1:00 a.m. CDT) at 25.0°N 87.8°W – Tropical Depression Ten forms from a tropical wave over the Gulf of Mexico about 375 miles (600 km) west-southwest of St. Petersburg, Florida.

September 20

Tropical Storm Harvey slowly gaining strength on September 20

- 00:00 UTC (7:00 p.m. CDT, September 19) at 26.3°N 87.4°W – Tropical Depression Ten strengthens into Tropical Storm Harvey about 310 miles (500 km) west-southwest of St. Petersburg.
- 06:00 UTC (2:00 a.m. AST) at 26.8°N 61.4°W – Hurricane Gert weakens back to Category 3 intensity about 430 mi (695 km) south-southeast of Bermuda.

September 21

- 00:00 UTC (8:00 p.m. AST, September 20) at 29.2°N 62.9°W – Hurricane Gert weakens to Category 2 intensity about 240 mi (390 km) south-southeast of Bermuda.
- 08:00 UTC (4:00 a.m. EDT) at 26.3°N 83.7°W – Tropical Storm Harvey attains its peak intensity, with maximum sustained winds of 60 mph (95 km/h) and a minimum central pressure of 994 mbar (29.35 inHg), about 120 mi (195 km) south-southwest of St. Petersburg.
- 17:00 UTC (1:00 p.m. EDT) at 25.9°N 81.7°W – Tropical Storm Harvey makes landfall near Everglades City, Florida, with maximum sustained winds of 60 mph (95 km/h) and a central pressure of 999 mbar (29.50 inHg), and later emerges over the Atlantic Ocean.
- 18:00 UTC (2:00 p.m. AST) at 32.7°N 62.1°W – Hurricane Gert weakens to Category 1 intensity about 155 mi (250 km) east of Bermuda.

September 22

- 00:00 UTC (8:00 p.m. EDT, September 21) at 26.9°N 78.6°W – Tropical Storm Harvey is last noted as a tropical cyclone near Grand Bahama, dissipating shortly thereafter when it is absorbed by an extratropical low.

September 23

- 00:00 UTC (8:00 p.m. AST, September 22) at 42.2°N 55.6°W – Hurricane Gert weakens into a tropical storm about 335 mi (535 km) south-southwest of Cape Race, Newfoundland.
- 12:00 UTC (8:00 a.m. AST) at 46.6°N 51.9°W – Tropical Storm Gert transitions into an extratropical cyclone about 60 mi (95 km) east of Cape Race, and later merges with another extratropical low.

=== October ===
October 4

The short but erratic storm path of Tropical Depression Eleven

- 06:00 UTC (1:00 a.m. CDT) at 20.1°N 94.1°W – Tropical Depression Eleven forms from a tropical wave over the Gulf of Mexico about 150 miles (240 km) east-northeast of Veracruz, Veracruz.

October 5

- 00:00 UTC (7:00 p.m. CDT, October 4) at 18.9°N 93.8°W – Tropical Depression Eleven attains its peak intensity, with maximum sustained winds of 35 mph (55 km/h) and a minimum central pressure of 1002 mbar (29.59 inHg), about 155 mi (250 km) east of Veracruz.

October 6

- 00:00 UTC (8:00 p.m. AST, October 5) at 14.4°N 44.8°W – Tropical Depression Twelve forms from a tropical wave about 995 mi (1,600 km) east of Barbados.
- 12:00 UTC (7:00 a.m. CDT) at 20.4°N 96.4°W – Tropical Depression Eleven is last noted as a tropical cyclone about 85 mi (140 km) north of Veracruz, dissipating shortly thereafter when it merges with a large surface trough.
- 12:00 UTC (8:00 a.m. AST) at 15.0°N 45.8°W – Tropical Depression Twelve attains its peak intensity, with maximum sustained winds of 35 mph (55 km/h) and a minimum central pressure of 1007 mbar (29.74 inHg), about 930 mi (1,500 km) east of Barbados.

October 8

The storm path of Tropical Depression Twelve

- 18:00 UTC (2:00 p.m. AST) at 17.3°N 48.5°W – Tropical Depression Twelve is last noted as a tropical cyclone about 790 mi (1,270 km) east-northeast of Barbados, dissipating shortly thereafter.

October 13

- 06:00 UTC (2:00 a.m. EDT) at 17.3°N 83.3°W – Tropical Depression Thirteen forms from a broad low-pressure area over the northwestern Caribbean Sea, about 185 mi (295 km) southwest of George Town, Grand Cayman.
- 12:00 UTC (8:00 a.m. EDT) at 18.5°N 83.4°W – Tropical Depression Thirteen strengthens into Tropical Storm Irene about 145 mi (230 km) west-southwest of George Town.

October 14

- 12:00 UTC (8:00 a.m. EDT) at 21.7°N 83.0°W – Tropical Storm Irene makes its first landfall on the western portion of the Isle of Youth in Cuba with maximum sustained winds of 70 mph (110 km/h) and a central pressure of 997 mbar (29.44 inHg).
- 19:00 UTC (3:00 p.m. EDT) at 22.7°N 82.5°W – Tropical Storm Irene makes its second landfall near Batabanó, Cuba, with maximum sustained winds of 70 mph (110 km/h) and a central pressure of 986 mbar (29.12 inHg), and soon emerges over the Straits of Florida.

October 15

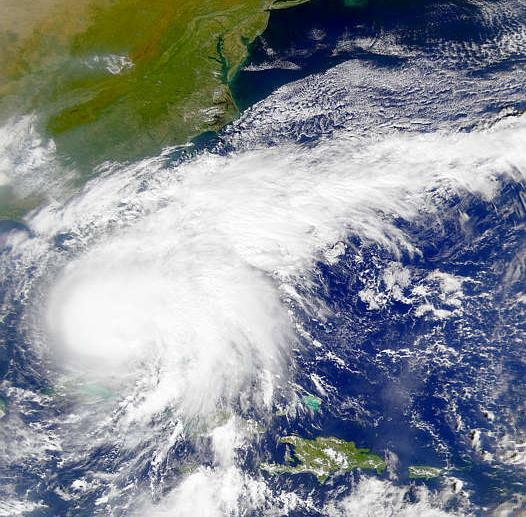
Hurricane Irene making landfall on Florida on October 15

- 06:00 UTC (2:00 p.m. EDT) at 23.8°N 82.2°W – Tropical Storm Irene strengthens into a Category 1 hurricane about 45 mi (75 km) north of Havana, Cuba.
- 13:00 UTC (9:00 a.m. EDT) at 24.6°N 81.6°W – Hurricane Irene makes its third landfall near Key West, Florida, with maximum sustained winds of 75 mph (120 km/h) and a central pressure of 987 mbar (29.15 inHg).
- 20:00 UTC (4:00 p.m. EDT) at 25.3°N 81.1°W – Hurricane Irene makes its fourth and final landfall near Cape Sable, Florida, with maximum sustained winds of 80 mph (130 km/h) and a central pressure of 987 mbar (29.15 inHg). It emerges over the Atlantic Ocean near Jupiter, Florida, early the following day.

October 17

- 18:00 UTC (2:00 p.m. AST) at 9.8°N 50.8°W – Tropical Depression Fourteen forms from a tropical wave about 640 mi (1,030 km) east-southeast of Barbados.

October 18

- 06:00 UTC (2:00 a.m. EDT) at 34.8°N 75.2°W – Hurricane Irene strengthens to Category 2 intensity while brushing the Outer Banks of North Carolina.
- 06:00 UTC (2:00 a.m. AST) at 10.9°N 52.8°W – Tropical Depression Fourteen strengthens into Tropical Storm Jose about 485 mi (780 km) east-southeast of Barbados.
- 07:56 UTC (3:56 a.m. EDT) at 35.4°N 74.4°W – Hurricane Irene attains its peak intensity, with maximum sustained winds of 110 mph (175 km/h) and a minimum central pressure of 958 mbar (28.29 inHg), about 65 mi (100 km) east of Cape Hatteras, North Carolina.
- 18:00 UTC (2:00 pm EDT) at 39.0°N 67.4°W – Hurricane Irene weakens to Category 1 intensity about 520 mi (835 km) east-northeast of Cape Hatteras.

October 19

- 06:00 UTC (2:00 a.m. AST) at 44.9°N 51.5°W – Hurricane Irene transitions into an extratropical cyclone about 145 mi (230 km) south-southeast of Cape Race, and is later absorbed by a much larger extratropical cyclone.
- 18:00 UTC (2:00 p.m. AST) at 14.9°N 58.9°W – Tropical Storm Jose strengthens into a Category 1 hurricane about 125 mi (205 km) north-northeast of Barbados.

October 20

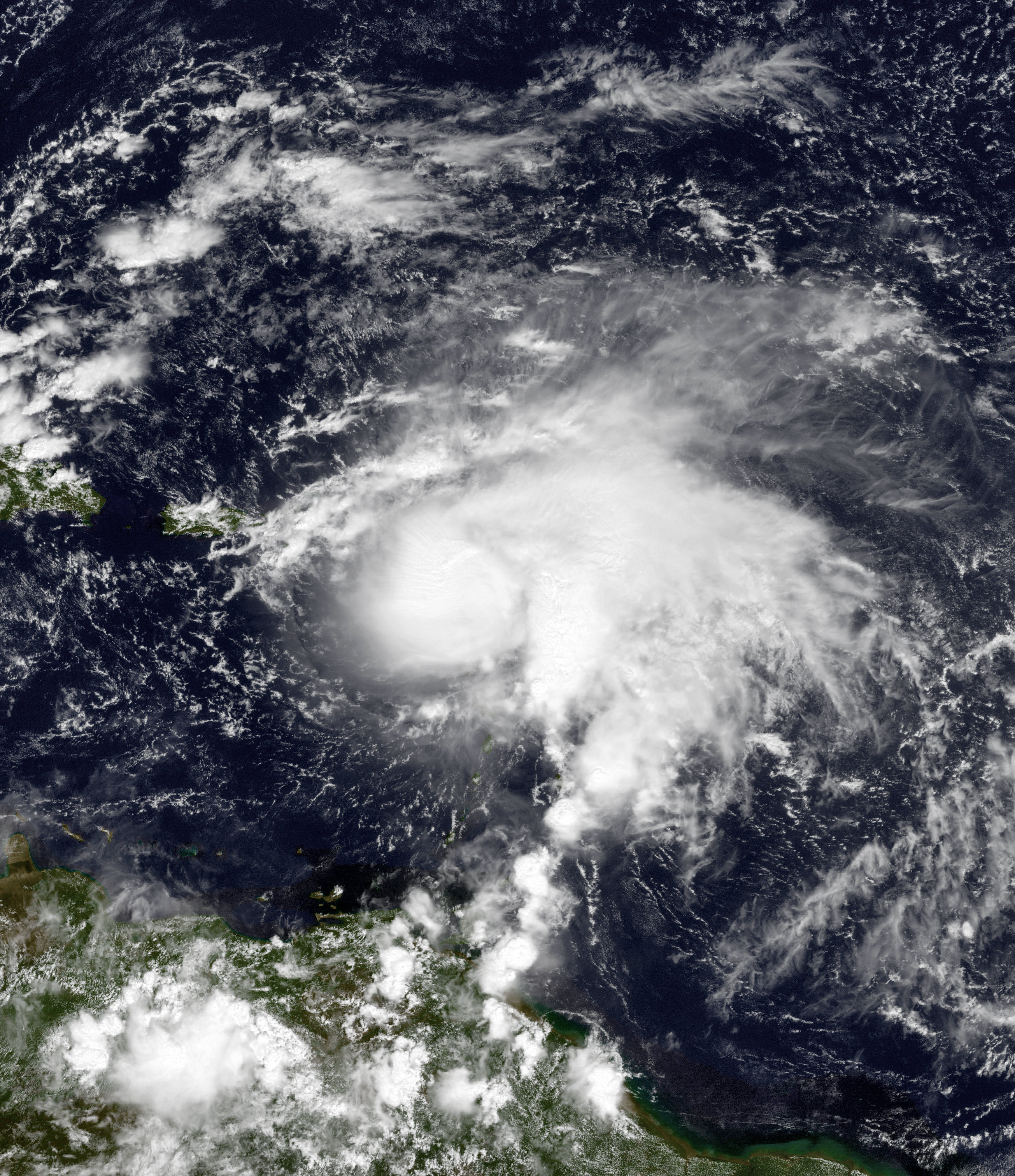
Hurricane Jose over the Leeward Islands on October 20

- 06:00 UTC (2:00 a.m. AST) at 16.3°N 60.2°W – Hurricane Jose attains a minimum central pressure of 979 mbar (28.91 inHg) about 120 mi (195 km) east-southeast of Antigua.
- 12:00 UTC (8:00 a.m. AST) at 16.8°N 61.1°W – Hurricane Jose strengthens to Category 2 intensity and attains peak maximum sustained winds of 100 mph (155 km/h) about 50 mi (85 km) east-southeast of Antigua.
- 16:00 UTC (12:00 p.m. AST) at 17.1°N 61.7°W – Hurricane Jose weakens to Category 1 intensity as it makes its first landfall on Antigua with maximum sustained winds of 90 mph (150 km/h) and a central pressure of 982 mbar (29.00 inHg).

October 21

- 11:05 UTC (7:05 a.m. AST) at 18.4°N 64.6°W – Hurricane Jose weakens into a tropical storm as it makes its second and final landfall on Tortola with maximum sustained winds of 70 mph (110 km/h) and a central pressure of 996 mbar (29.41 inHg).

October 24

- 12:00 UTC (8:00 a.m. AST) at 29.7°N 61.1°W – Tropical Storm Jose restrengthens into a Category 1 hurricane about 280 mi (455 km) southeast of Bermuda.

October 25

- 00:00 UTC (8:00 p.m. AST) at 34.9°N 58.1°W – Hurricane Jose weakens back into a tropical storm about 420 mi (675 km) east-northeast of Bermuda.
- 12:00 UTC (8:00 a.m. AST) at 40.0°N 51.8°W – Tropical Storm Jose transitions into an extratropical cyclone about 890 mi (1,435 km) northeast of Bermuda, and dissipates shortly thereafter when it is absorbed by a larger extratropical cyclone.

October 28

- 18:00 UTC (2:00 p.m. EDT) at 11.4°N 80.9°W – Tropical Depression Fifteen forms from a broad low-pressure area about 195 mi (315 km) east of Bluefields, Nicaragua.

October 29

Tropical Storm Katrina approaching Nicaragua late on October 29

- 18:00 UTC (1:00 p.m. CDT) at 13.2°N 82.9°W – Tropical Depression Fifteen strengthens into Tropical Storm Katrina about 65 mi (100 km) south-southeast of Puerto Cabezas, Nicaragua.

October 30

- 00:00 UTC (7:00 p.m. CDT, October 29) at 13.8°N 83.4°W – Tropical Storm Katrina attains its peak intensity as it makes its first landfall just south of Puerto Cabezas with maximum sustained winds of 40 mph (65 km/h) and a minimum central pressure of 999 mbar (29.50 inHg).
- 06:00 UTC (1:00 a.m. CDT) at 14.1°N 84.0°W – Tropical Storm Katrina weakens into a tropical depression inland about 40 mi (65 km) west of Puerto Cabezas, and later emerges over the northwestern Caribbean Sea off the coast of Honduras.

October 31

- 12:00 UTC (6:00 a.m. CST) (Note: Daylight saving time ended on October 31, 1998. At 2:00 a.m. CDT, clocks were moved back to 1:00 a.m. CST.) at 18.4°N 88.0°W – Tropical Depression Katrina is located just inland from the Caribbean coast near the Mexico–Belize border, with maximum sustained winds of 30 mph (45 km/h) and a central pressure of 1008 mbar (29.77 inHg), having made its second and final landfall shortly prior.

=== November ===
November 1

- 12:00 UTC (6:00 a.m. CST) at 21.2°N 89.8°W – Tropical Depression Katrina is last noted as a tropical cyclone about 15 mi (30 km) northwest of Mérida, Yucatán, dissipating shortly thereafter when it is absorbed by a cold front.

November 13

- 18:00 UTC (1:00 p.m. EST) at 16.7°N 81.6°W – Tropical Depression Sixteen forms from a broad low-pressure area about 185 mi (295 km) south of the Cayman Islands.

November 14

- 12:00 UTC (7:00 a.m. EST) at 16.4°N 79.9°W – Tropical Depression Sixteen strengthens into Tropical Storm Lenny about 220 mi (350 km) south-southeast of the Cayman Islands.

November 15

- 00:00 UTC (7:00 p.m. EST, November 14) at 16.0°N 78.6°W – Tropical Storm Lenny strengthens into a Category 1 hurricane about 180 mi (285 km) southwest of Kingston, Jamaica.
- 12:00 UTC (7:00 a.m. EST) at 15.1°N 76.4°W – Hurricane Lenny strengthens to Category 2 intensity about 200 mi (325 km) south of Kingston.
- 18:00 UTC (1:00 p.m. EST) at 14.8°N 74.8°W – Hurricane Lenny weakens to Category 1 intensity about 255 mi (405 km) south-southeast of Kingston.

November 16

- 12:00 UTC (7:00 a.m. EST) at 15.1°N 70.5°W – Hurricane Lenny restrengthens to Category 2 intensity about 220 mi (350 km) south-southeast of Pedernales, Dominican Republic.

November 17

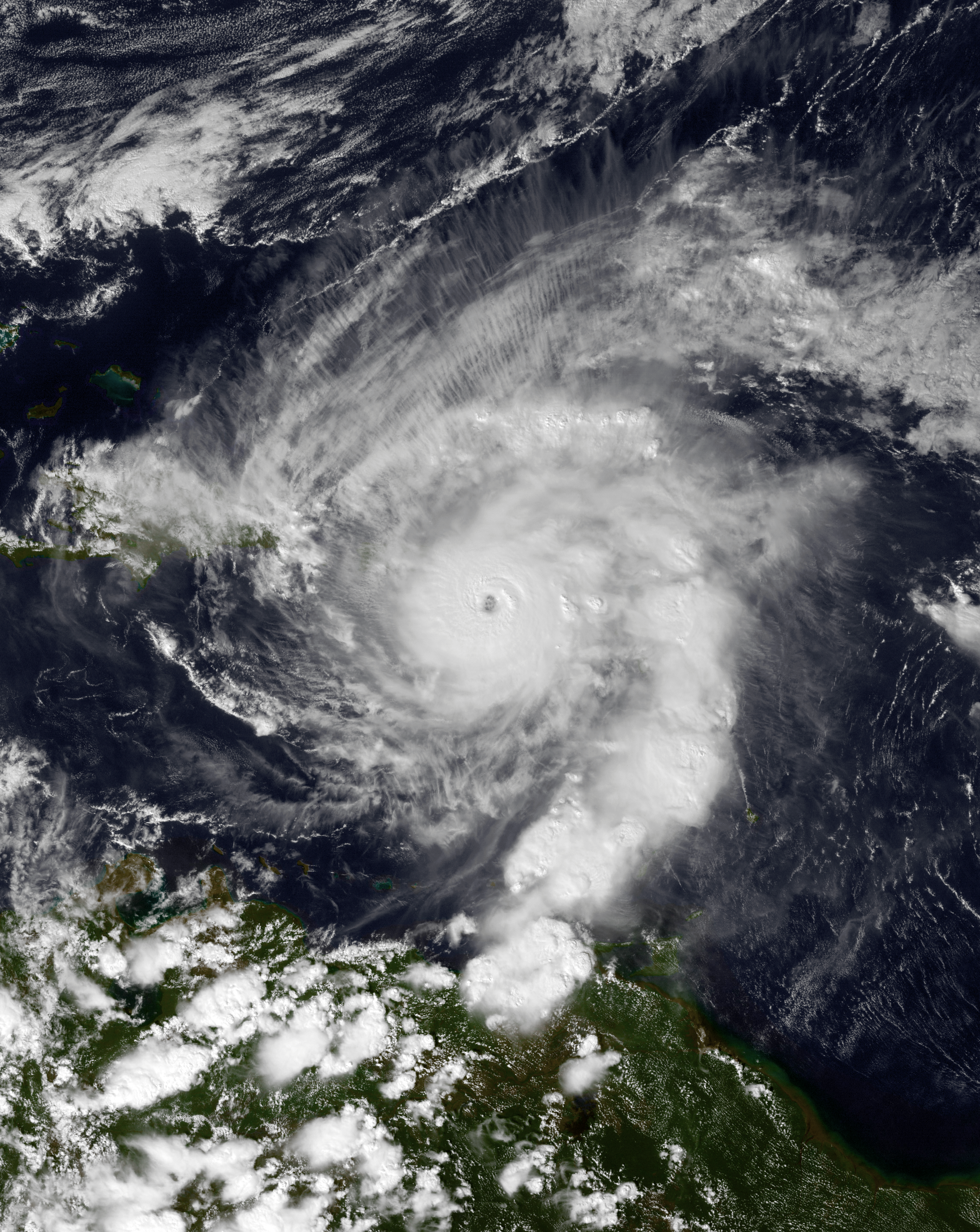
Hurricane Lenny at peak intensity late on November 17

- 00:00 UTC (7:00 p.m. EST, November 16) at 15.9°N 67.6°W – Hurricane Lenny strengthens to Category 3 intensity about 195 mi (315 km) south-southeast of Cabo Engaño, Dominican Republic.
- 12:00 UTC (7:00 a.m. EST) at 16.8°N 65.5°W – Hurricane Lenny strengthens to Category 4 intensity about 75 mi (120 km) southwest of Saint Croix.
- 18:00 UTC (2:00 p.m. AST) at 17.4°N 64.8°W – Hurricane Lenny attains its peak intensity, with maximum sustained winds of 155 mph (250 km/h) and a minimum central pressure of 933 mbar (27.55 inHg), about 25 mi (35 km) south of Saint Croix.

November 18

- 18:00 UTC (2:00 p.m. AST) at 18.0°N 63.3°W – Hurricane Lenny weakens to Category 3 intensity as it makes its first landfall on Saint Martin with maximum sustained winds of 125 mph (205 km/h) and a central pressure of 966 mbar (28.53 inHg).

November 19

- 00:00 UTC (8:00 p.m. AST, November 18) at 18.1°N 63.1°W – Hurricane Lenny weakens to Category 2 intensity as it makes its second landfall on Anguilla with maximum sustained winds of 100 mph (155 km/h) and a central pressure of 975 mbar (28.79 inHg).
- 06:00 UTC (2:00 a.m. AST) at 18.0°N 62.9°W – Hurricane Lenny weakens to Category 1 intensity as it makes its third landfall on Saint Barthélemy with maximum sustained winds of 85 mph (140 km/h) and a central pressure of 979 mbar (28.91 inHg).
- 18:00 UTC (2:00 p.m. AST) at 17.6°N 62.5°W – Hurricane Lenny weakens into a tropical storm about 40 mi (65 km) southeast of Saint Barthélemy.

November 20

- 00:00 UTC (8:00 p.m. AST, November 19) at 17.3°N 61.8°W – Tropical Storm Lenny makes its fourth and final landfall on Antigua with maximum sustained winds of 65 mph (100 km/h) and a central pressure of 994 mbar (29.35 inHg).

November 21

- 00:00 UTC (8:00 p.m. AST, November 20) at 16.5°N 58.1°W – Tropical Storm Lenny weakens into a tropical depression about 255 mi (405 km) east of Antigua.

November 23

- 06:00 UTC (2:00 a.m. AST) at 18.5°N 52.8°W – Tropical Depression Lenny is last noted as a tropical cyclone about 600 mi (965 km) east of Antigua, dissipating shortly thereafter.

November 30

- The 1999 Atlantic hurricane season officially ends.

== See also ==
- Timeline of the 1999 Pacific hurricane season
- Atlantic hurricane season
- Tropical cyclones in 1999
