= Timeline of the 1999 Pacific hurricane season =

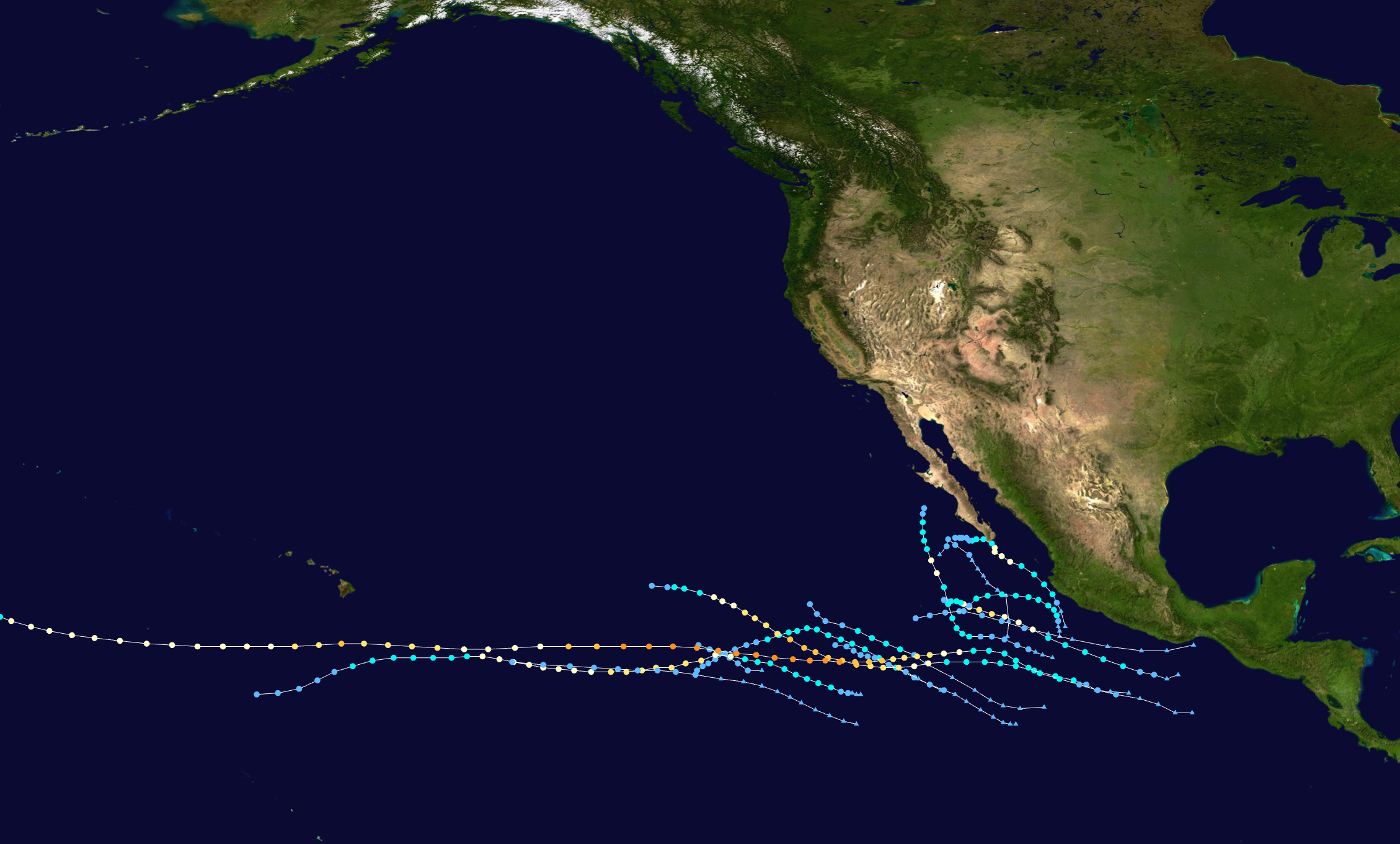
- Season summary map

Season boundaries
- First system formed: June 18, 1999
- Last system dissipated: October 11, 1999

Strongest system
- Name: Dora
- Maximum winds: 140 mph (220 km/h) (1-minute sustained)
- Lowest pressure: 943 mbar (hPa; 27.85 inHg)

Longest lasting system
- Name: Dora
- Duration: 14 days
Storm articles
- Hurricane Dora (1999)
- Hurricane Greg (1999)

The 1999 Pacific hurricane season was the annual cycle of tropical cyclone formation over the Pacific Ocean north of the equator and east of the International Date Line. The season officially began on May 15 in the Eastern Pacific proper (east of 140°W) and June 1 in the Central Pacific (140°W to the International Date Line), and ended on November 30 in both areas. This is historically the period during which most tropical cyclogenesis occurs in these respective areas. The first system, Hurricane Adrian, formed on June 18; the final system, Tropical Storm Irwin, dissipated on October 11.

Activity during the season was well below average. (Note: During the period from 1991 to 2020, an average Pacific hurricane season generated fifteen tropical storms, eight hurricanes, and four major hurricanes.) Nine named tropical storms developed, with six becoming hurricanes and two further strengthening into major hurricanes—Category 3 or higher on the five-level Saffir–Simpson scale. The season also produced five tropical depressions that did not attain tropical storm status. Only one tropical cyclone, Hurricane Greg, made landfall. It brushed central Mexico in its formative stages before striking the Baja California peninsula as a weakening tropical storm, killing ten people during its journey. Earlier in the season, flooding from peripheral rainfall produced by Hurricane Adrian caused several fatalities in Mexico. Also notable was Hurricane Dora, which was a rare tropical cyclone that existed in all three northern Pacific basins: Eastern, Central, and Western.

This timeline documents tropical cyclone formations, strengthening, weakening, landfalls, and dissipations during the season. It includes information that was not released during the season, meaning that data from post-storm reviews by the National Hurricane Center and the Central Pacific Hurricane Center has been included.

The time stamp for each event is first stated using Coordinated Universal Time (UTC), the 24-hour clock where 00:00 = midnight UTC. The NHC uses both UTC and the time zone where the center of the tropical cyclone was then located. Prior to 2015, two time zones were utilized in the Eastern Pacific basin: Pacific for the Eastern Pacific, and Hawaii−Aleutian for the Central Pacific. In this timeline, the respective area time is included in parentheses. Additionally, figures for maximum sustained winds and position estimates are rounded to the nearest 5 units (miles, or kilometers), following NHC practice. Direct wind observations are rounded to the nearest whole number. Atmospheric pressures are listed to the nearest millibar and nearest hundredth of an inch of mercury.

== Timeline of events ==
=== May ===
There were no tropical cyclones in May.

May 15

- The 1999 Eastern Pacific hurricane season begins.

=== June ===
June 1

- The 1999 Central Pacific hurricane season begins.

June 18

- 06:00 UTC (11:00 p.m. PDT, June 17) at 13.5°N 98.2°W – A tropical depression forms from a broad low-pressure area about 260 mi (415 km) southeast of Acapulco, Guerrero.
- 18:00 UTC (111:00 a.m. PDT) at 14.1°N 100.4°W – The recently formed tropical depression strengthens into Tropical Storm Adrian about 195 mi (315 km) south of Acapulco.

June 20

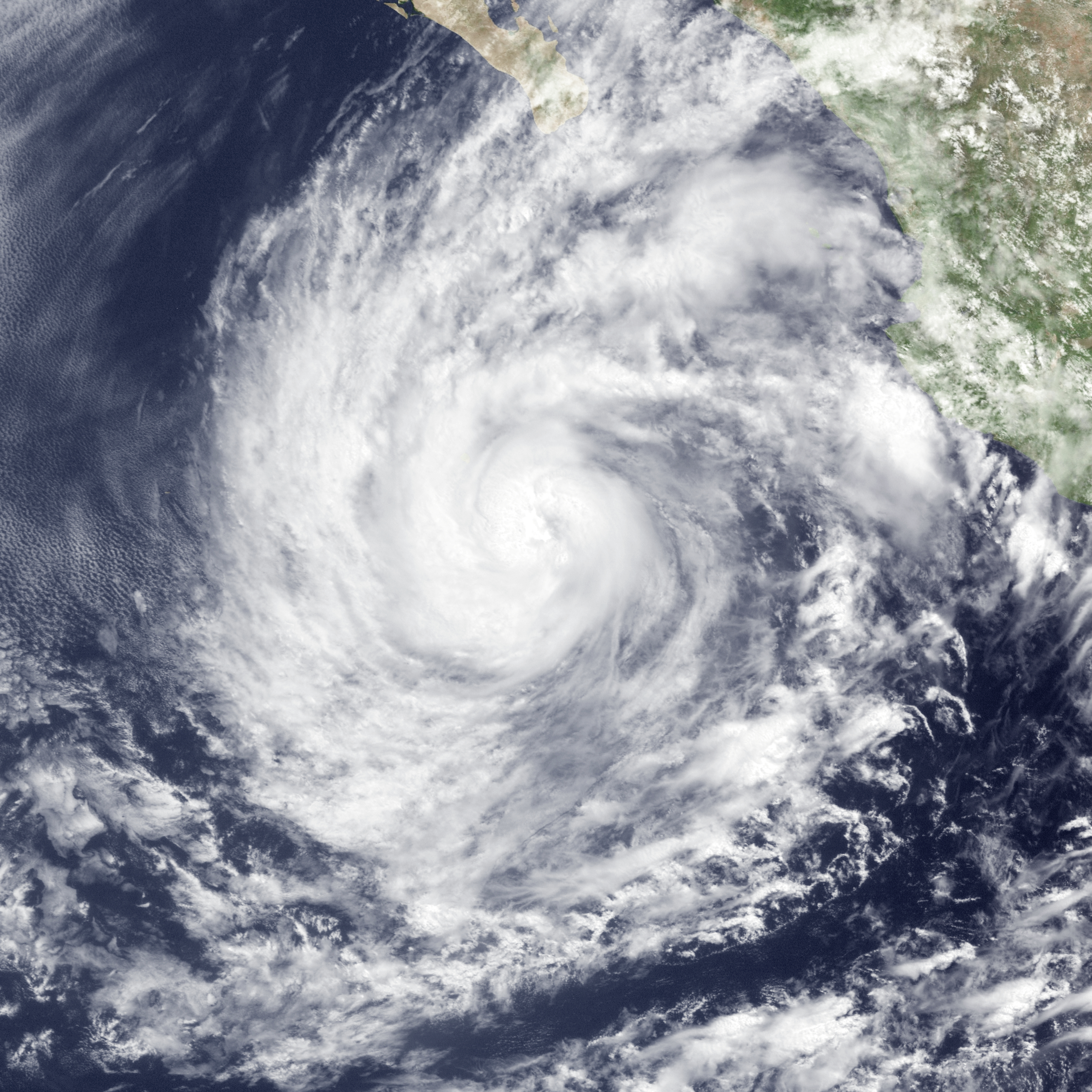
Hurricane Adrian near peak intensity on June 20

- 00:00 UTC (5:00 p.m. PDT, June 19) at 16.7°N 106.8°W – Tropical Storm Adrian strengthens into a Category 1 hurricane on the Saffir–Simpson scale about 485 mi (780 km) south-southeast of the southern tip of the Baja California peninsula.
- 18:00 UTC (11:00 a.m. PDT) at 17.8°N 109.7°W – Hurricane Adrian strengthens to Category 2 intensity about 350 mi (565 km) south of the southern tip of the Baja California peninsula. It simultaneously attains its peak intensity, with maximum sustained winds of 100 mph (155 km/h) and a minimum central pressure of 973 mbar (28.73 inHg).

June 21

- 06:00 UTC (11:00 p.m. PDT, June 20) at 18.3°N 111.3°W – Hurricane Adrian weakens to Category 1 intensity about 330 mi (530 km) south-southwest of the southern tip of the Baja California peninsula.
- 18:00 UTC (11:00 a.m. PDT) at 18.6°N 111.9°W – Hurricane Adrian weakens into a tropical storm about 320 mi (520 km) south-southwest of the southern tip of the Baja California peninsula.

June 22

- 12:00 UTC (5:00 a.m. PDT) at 18.7°N 112.9°W – Tropical Storm Adrian weakens into a tropical depression about 345 mi (555 km) southwest of the southern tip of the Baja California peninsula, and later dissipates.

=== July ===
July 9

- 06:00 UTC (11:00 p.m. PDT, July 8) at 12.9°N 103.0°W – A tropical depression forms from a low-pressure area about 350 mi (565 km) south of Lázaro Cárdenas, Michoacán.
- 12:00 UTC (5:00 a.m. PDT) at 13.1°N 103.9°W – The recently formed tropical depression strengthens into Tropical Storm Beatriz about 355 mi (575 km) south-southwest of Lázaro Cárdenas.

July 11

- 12:00 UTC (5:00 a.m. PDT) at 14.3°N 114.2°W – Tropical Storm Beatriz strengthens into a Category 1 hurricane about 655 mi (1,055 km) south-southwest of the southern tip of the Baja California peninsula.

July 12

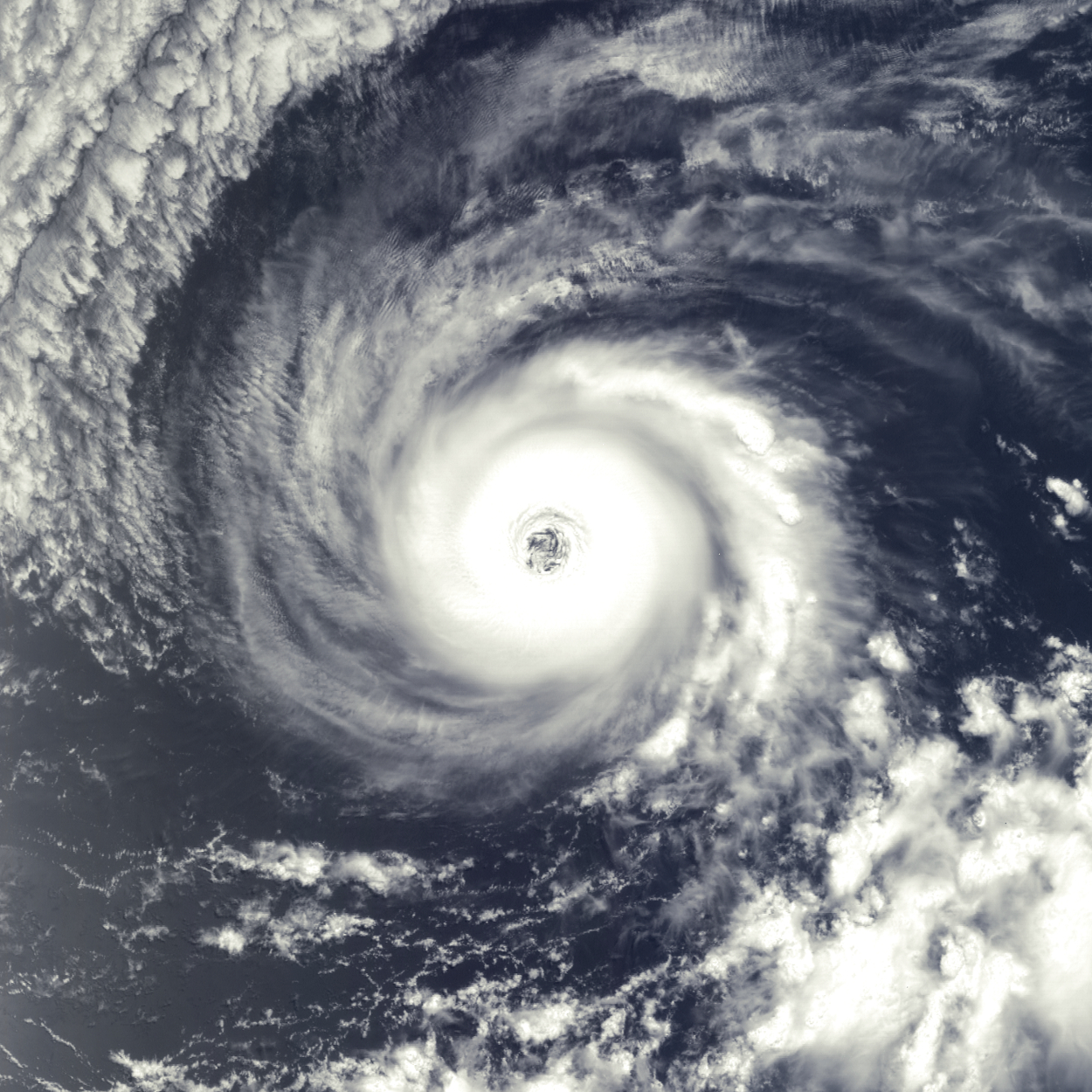
Hurricane Beatriz strengthening late on July 12

- 00:00 UTC (5:00 p.m. PDT, July 11) at 14.0°N 116.3°W – Hurricane Beatriz strengthens to Category 2 intensity about 740 mi (1,195 km) southwest of the southern tip of the Baja California peninsula.
- 18:00 UTC (11:00 a.m. PDT) at 14.2°N 119.3°W – Hurricane Beatriz strengthens to Category 3 intensity about 855 mi (1,380 km) southwest of the southern tip of the Baja California peninsula.

July 13

- 06:00 UTC (11:00 p.m. PDT, July 12) at 14.7°N 121.3°W – Hurricane Beatriz attains its peak intensity, with maximum sustained winds of 120 mph (195 km/h) and a minimum central pressure of 955 mbar (28.20 inHg), about 930 mi (1,500 km) southwest of the southern tip of Baja California.

July 14

- 06:00 UTC (11:00 p.m. PDT, July 13) at 16.4°N 124.9°W – Hurricane Beatriz weakens to Category 2 intensity about 1,070 mi (1,720 km) west-southwest of the southern tip of the Baja California peninsula.
- 06:00 UTC (11:00 p.m. PDT, July 13) at 16.8°N 107.4°W – Tropical Depression Three-E forms from a low-pressure area about 255 mi (405 km) southwest of Manzanillo, Colima.
- 12:00 UTC (5:00 a.m. PDT) at 17.3°N 109.0°W – Tropical Depression Three-E attains its peak intensity, with maximum sustained winds of 35 mph (55 km/h) and a minimum central pressure of 1,007 mbar (29.74 inHg), about 330 mi (530 km) west-southwest of Manzanillo.

July 15

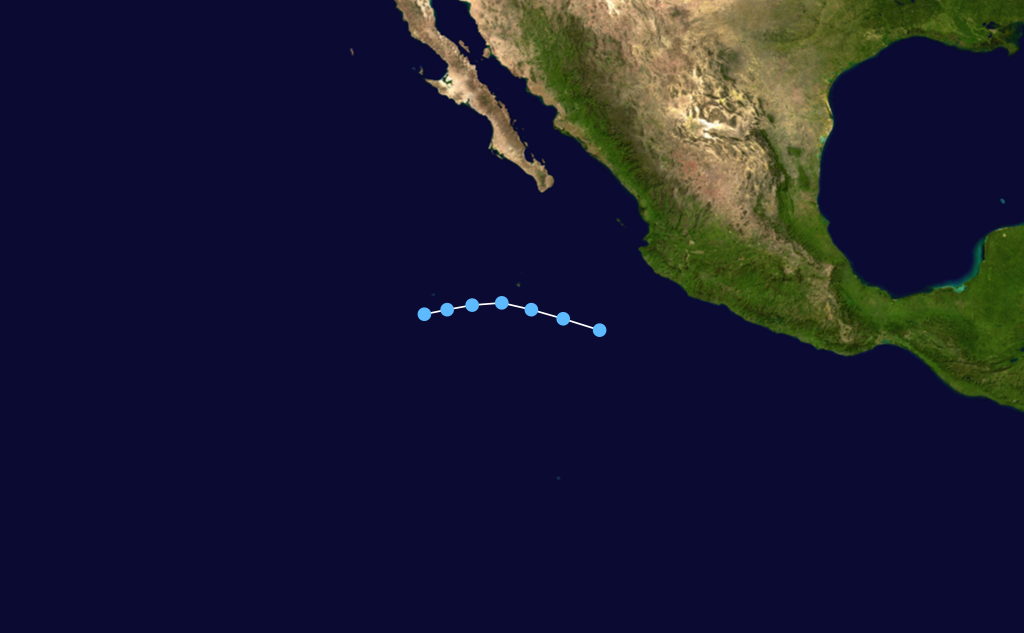
Storm path of Tropical Depression Three-E

- 06:00 UTC (11:00 p.m. PDT, July 14) at 18.4°N 128.0°W – Hurricane Beatriz weakens to Category 1 intensity about 1,205 mi (1,935 km) west-southwest of the southern tip of the Baja California peninsula.
- 18:00 UTC (11:00 a.m. PDT) at 17.5°N 115.1°W – Tropical Depression Three-E is last noted as a tropical cyclone about 500 mi (805 km) southwest of the southern tip of the Baja California peninsula, dissipating shortly thereafter.

July 16

- 00:00 UTC (5:00 p.m. PDT, July 15) at 19.3°N 130.4°W – Hurricane Beatriz weakens into a tropical storm about 1,340 mi (2,160 km) west of the southern tip of the Baja California peninsula.
- 18:00 UTC (11:00 a.m. PDT) at 19.7°N 132.7°W – Tropical Storm Beatriz weakens into a tropical depression about 1,480 mi (2,380 km) west of the southern tip of the Baja California peninsula.

July 17

- 00:00 UTC (5:00 p.m. PDT, July 16) at 19.8°N 133.8°W – Tropical Depression Beatriz is last noted as a tropical cyclone about 1,550 mi (2,490 km), dissipating shortly thereafter.

July 23

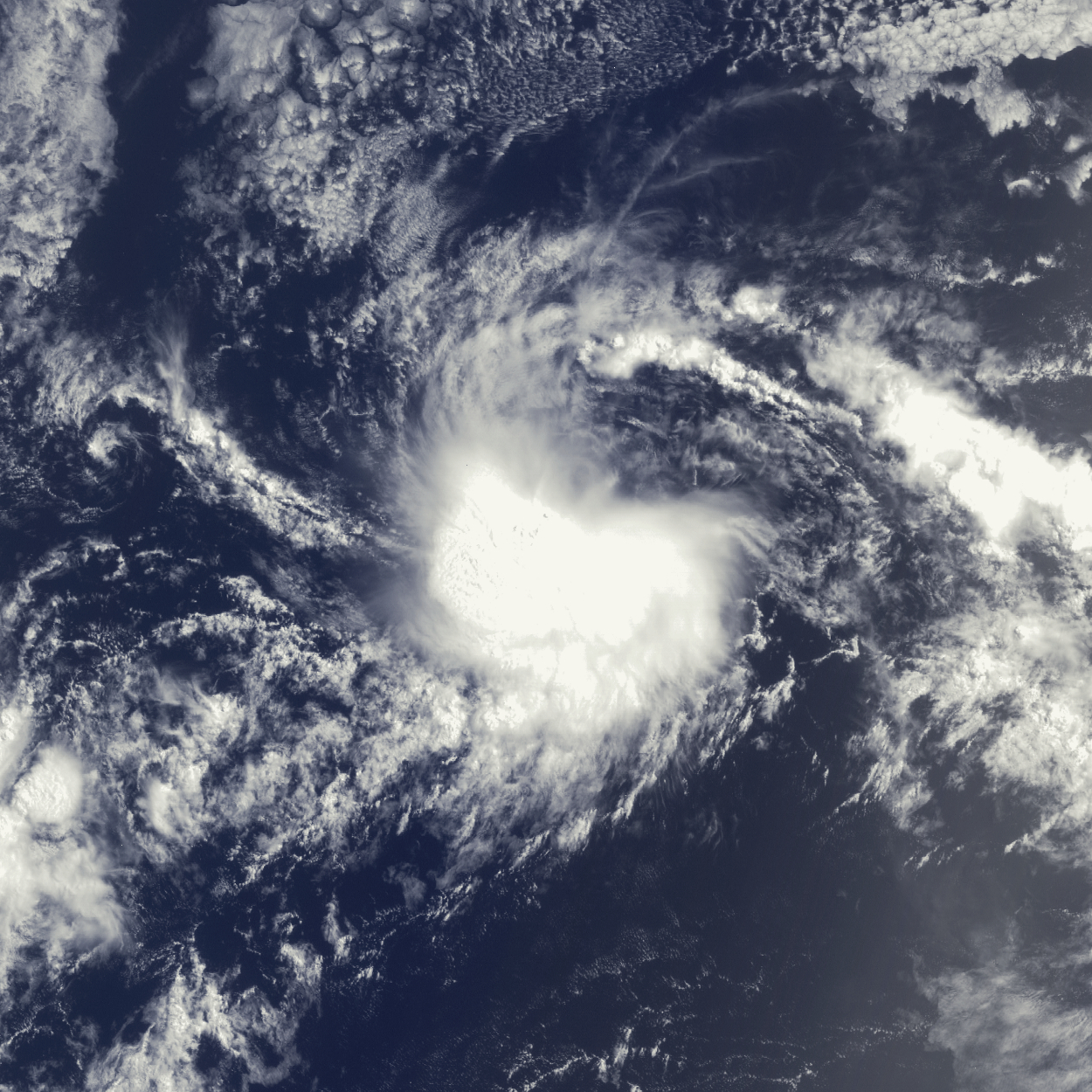
Tropical Depression Four-E at peak intensity on July 23

- 00:00 UTC (5:00 p.m. PDT, July 22) at 13.5°N 130.7°W – Tropical Depression Four-E forms from a tropical wave about 1,500 mi (2,415 km) west-southwest of the southern tip of the Baja California peninsula.
- 18:00 UTC (11:00 a.m. PDT) at 13.8°N 134.8°W – Tropical Depression Four-E attains its peak intensity, with maximum sustained winds of 35 mph (55 km/h) and a minimum central pressure of 1007 mbar (29.74 inHg), about 1,745 mi (2,805 km) west-southwest of the southern tip of the Baja California peninsula.

July 24

- 18:00 UTC (8:00 a.m. HST) at 14.2°N 141.5°W – Tropical Depression Four-E crosses into the Central Pacfific basin about 995 mi (1,600 km) east-southeast of South Point, Hawaii.

July 25

- 00:00 UTC (2:00 p.m. HST, July 24) at 14.4°N 143.7°W – Tropical Depression Four-E is last noted as a tropical cyclone about 850 mi (1,370 km) east-southeast of South Point, dissipating shortly thereafter.
- 06:00 UTC (11:00 p.m. PDT, July 24) at 14.9°N 115.2°W – Another tropical depression forms from a tropical wave about 650 mi (1,045 km) south-southwest of the southern tip of the Baja California peninsula.
- 12:00 UTC (5:00 a.m. PDT) at 15.3°N 116.2°W – The recently formed tropical depression strengthens into Tropical Storm Calvin about 660 mi (1,065 km) southwest of the southern tip of the Baja California peninsula. It simultaneously attains its peak intensity, with maximum sustained winds of 40 mph (65 km/h) and a minimum central pressure of 1005 mbar (29.68 inHg).

July 26

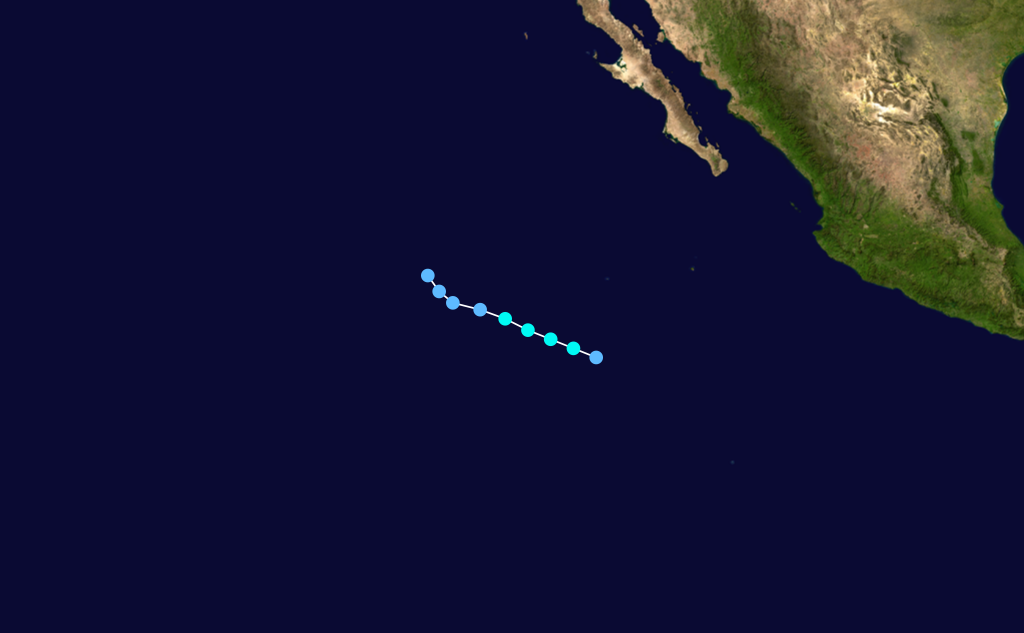
Storm path of Tropical Storm Calvin

- 12:00 UTC (5:00 a.m. PDT) at 17.0°N 120.3°W – Tropical Storm Calvin weakens into a tropical depression about 785 mi (1,260 km) west-southwest of the southern tip of the Baja California peninsula.
- 18:00 UTC (11:00 a.m. PDT) at 13.8°N 127.0°W – Tropical Depression Six-E forms from a tropical wave about 1,275 mi (2,055 km) west-southwest of the southern tip of the Baja California peninsula.

July 27

- 06:00 UTC (11:00 p.m. PDT, July 26) at 18.5°N 122.6°W – Tropical Depression Calvin is last noted as a tropical cyclone about 870 mi (1,400 km) west-southwest of the southern tip of the Baja California peninsula, dissipating shortly thereafter.
- 06:00 UTC (11:00 p.m. PDT, July 26) at 14.7°N 128.3°W – Tropical Depression Six-E attains its peak intensity, with maximum sustained winds of 35 mph (55 km/h) and a minimum central pressure of 1005 mbar (29.68 inHg), about 1,325 mi (2,130 km) west-southwest of the southern tip of the Baja California peninsula.

July 28

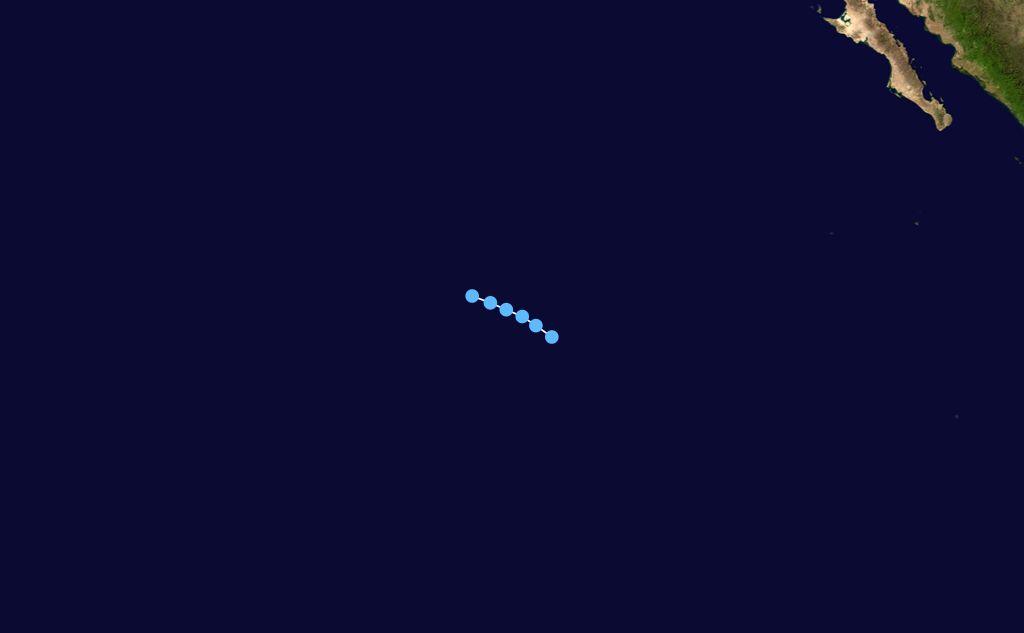
Storm path of Tropical Depression Six-E

- 00:00 UTC (5:00 p.m. PDT, July 27) at 15.6°N 130.5°W – Tropical Depression Six-E is last noted as a tropical cyclone about 1,425 mi (2,295 km) west-southwest of the southern tip of the Baja California peninsula, dissipating shortly thereafter.

=== August ===
August 6

- 00:00 UTC (5:00 p.m. PDT, August 5) at 12.1°N 100.9°W – Tropical Depression Seven-E forms from a tropical wave about 335 mi (535 km) south of Acapulco.
- 06:00 UTC (11:00 p.m. PDT, August 5) at 12.2°N 119.9°W – Tropical Depression Eight-E forms from a tropical wave about 985 mi (1,585 km) southwest of the southern tip of the Baja California peninsula.
- 18:00 UTC (11:00 a.m. PDT) at 13.2°N 104.9°W – Tropical Depression Seven-E strengthens into Tropical Storm Dora about 420 mi (675 km) southwest of Acapulco.
- 18:00 UTC (11:00 a.m. PDT) at 12.6°N 121.1°W – Tropical Depression Eight-E strengthens into Tropical Storm Eugene about 1,020 mi (1,640 km) southwest of the southern tip of the Baja California peninsula.

August 8

- 12:00 UTC (5:00 a.m. PDT) at 15.1°N 112.0°W – Tropical Storm Dora strengthens into a Category 1 hurricane about 550 mi (890 km) south-southwest of the southern tip of the Baja California peninsula.
- 18:00 UTC (11:00 a.m. PDT) at 14.8°N 128.2°W – Tropical Storm Eugene strengthens into a Category 1 hurricane about 1,310 mi (2,110 km) west-southwest of the southern tip of the Baja California peninsula.

August 9

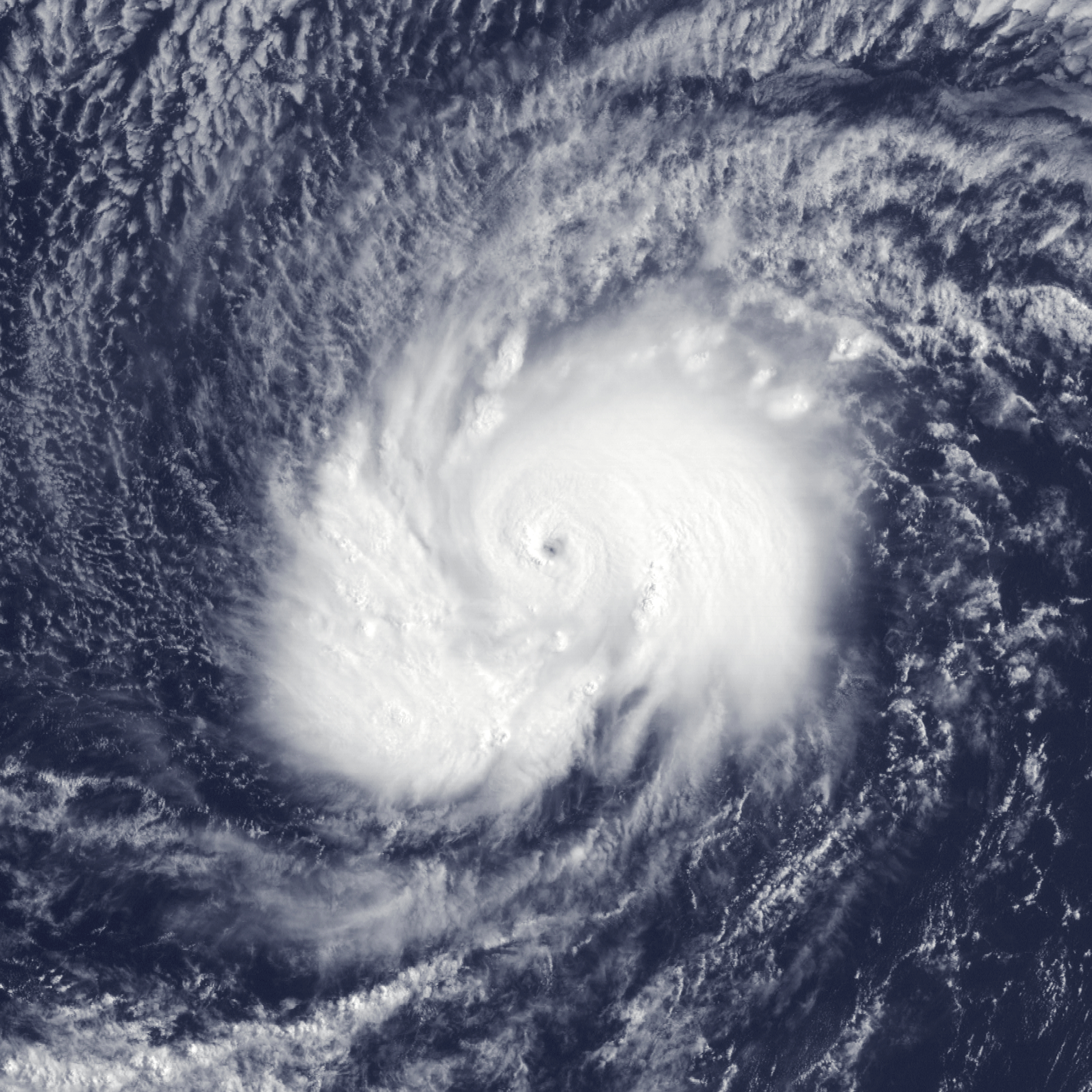
Hurricane Eugene at peak intensity on August 9

- 00:00 UTC (5:00 p.m. PDT, August 8) at 14.9°N 114.1°W – Hurricane Dora strengthens to Category 2 intensity about 615 mi (990 km) south-southwest of the southern tip of the Baja California peninsula.
- 06:00 UTC (11:00 p.m. PDT, August 8) at 14.5°N 130.3°W – Hurricane Eugene strengthens to Category 2 intensity about 1,450 mi (2,335 km) west-southwest of the southern tip of the Baja California peninsula.
- 18:00 UTC (11:00 a.m. PDT) at 14.0°N 132.4°W – Hurrican Eugene attains its peak intensity, with maximum sustained winds of 110 mph (175 km/h) and a minimum central pressure of 964 mbar (28.47 inHg), about 1,590 mi (2,555 km) west-southwest of the southern tip of the Baja California peninsula.

August 10

- 00:00 UTC (5:00 p.m. PDT, August 9) at 14.5°N 117.5°W – Hurricane Dora strengthens to Category 3 intensity about 760 mi (1,220 km) southwest of the southern tip of the Baja California peninsula.
- 18:00 UTC (11:00 a.m. PDT) at 14.4°N 120.5°W – Hurricane Dora strengthens to Category 4 intensity about 905 mi (1,455 km) southwest of the southern tip of the Baja California peninsula.

August 11

- 00:00 UTC (5:00 p.m. PDT, August 10) at 13.7°N 138.1°W – Hurricane Eugene weakens to Category 1 intensity about 1,945 mi (3,130 km) west-southwest of the southern tip of the Baja California peninsula.
- 12:00 UTC (2:00 a.m. HST) at 13.9°N 140.4°W – Hurricane Eugene crosses into the Central Pacific basin about 1,070 mi (1,720 km) east-southeast of South Point.

August 12

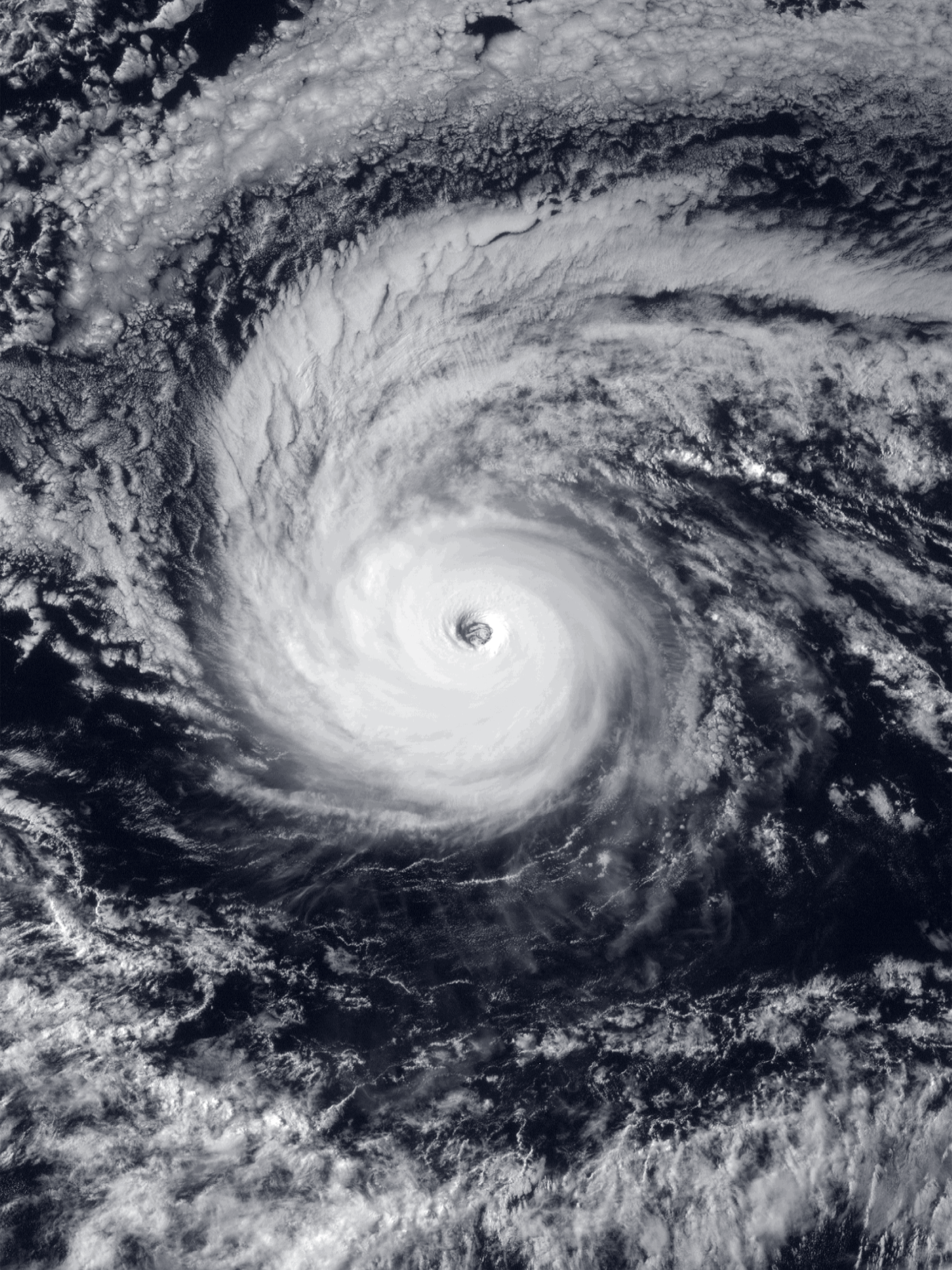
Hurricane Dora at peak intensity early on August 12

- 00:00 UTC (5:00 p.m. PDT, August 11) at 14.9°N 126.4°W – Hurricane Dora attains its peak intensity, with maximum sustained winds of 140 mph (220 km/h) and a minimum central pressure of 943 mbar (27.85 inHg), about 1,210 mi (1,945 km) west-southwest of the southern tip of the Baja California peninsula, making it the strongest storm of the season.

August 13

- 00:00 UTC (2:00 p.m. HST, August 12) at 14.8°N 146.9°W – Hurricane Eugene weakens into a tropical storm about 645 mi (1,035 km) east-southeast of South Point.
- 12:00 UTC (5:00 a.m. PDT) at 13.7°N 115.8°W – Tropical Depression Nine-E forms from a tropical wave about 740 mi (1,195 km) south-southwest of the southern tip of the Baja California peninsula.
- 18:00 UTC (11:00 a.m. PDT) at 15.5°N 137.7°W – Hurricane Dora weakens to Category 3 intensity about 1,875 mi (3,020 km) west of the southern tip of the Baja California peninsula.
- 18:00 UTC (11:00 a.m. PDT) at 14.2°N 117.0°W – Tropical Depression Nine-E attains its peak intensity, with maximum sustained winds of 35 mph (55 km/h) and a minimum central pressure of 1,005 mbar (29.68 inHg), about 755 mi (1,215 km) southwest of the southern tip of the Baja California peninsula.

August 14

- 06:00 UTC (8:00 p.m. HST, August 13) at 15.5°N 141.7°W – Hurricane Dora rapidly weakens to Category 1 intensity as it crosses into the Central Pacific basin about 950 mi (1,530 km) east of South Point.
- 18:00 UTC (8:00 a.m. HST) at 13.7°N 156.3°W – Tropical Storm Eugene weakens into a tropical depression about 360 mi (585 km) south of South Point.

August 15

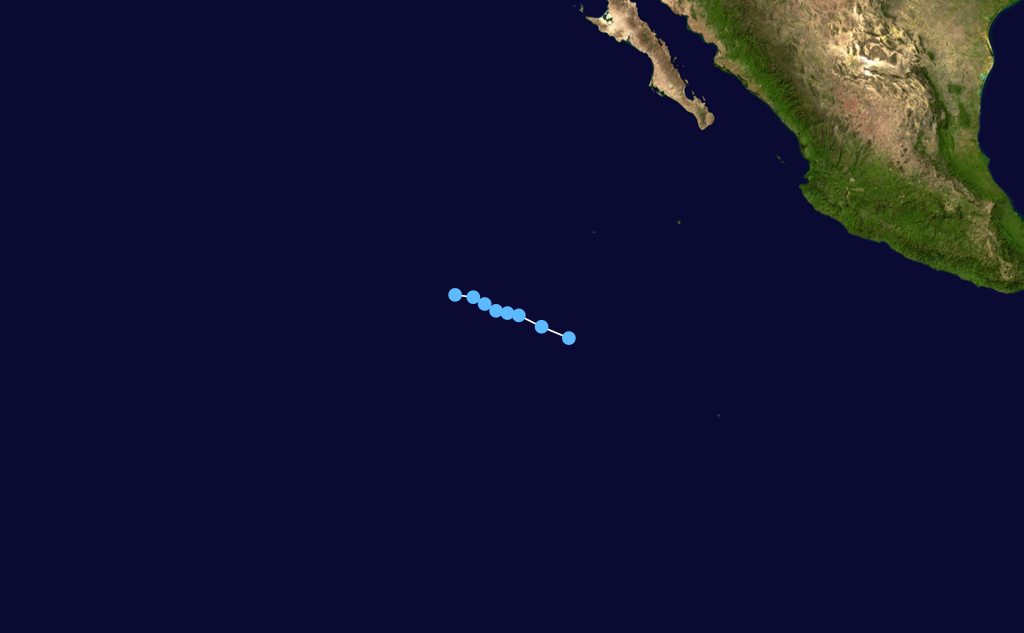
Storm path of Tropical Depression Nine-E

- 06:00 UTC (8:00 p.m. HST, August 14) at 15.4°N 149.0°W – Hurricane Dora restrengthens to Category 2 intensity about 500 mi (805 km) east-southeast of South Point.
- 06:00 UTC (11:00 p.m. PDT, August 14) at 15.6°N 120.8°W – Tropical Depression Nine-E is last noted as a tropical cyclone about 870 mi (1,400 km) southwest of the southern tip of the Baja California peninsula, dissipating shortly thereafter.
- 18:00 UTC (8:00 a.m. HST) at 12.1°N 161.8°W – Tropical Depression Eugene is last noted as a tropical cyclone about 610 mi (980 km) east-southeast of Johnston Atoll, dissipating shortly thereafter.

August 16

- 06:00 UTC (8:00 p.m. HST, August 15) at 15.7°N 155.8°W – Hurricane Dora restrengthens to Category 3 intensity about 225 mi (360 km) south of South Point.
- 12:00 UTC (2:00 a.m. HST) at 15.6°N 157.4°W – Hurricane Dora weakens back to Category 2 intensity about 255 mi (405 km) south-southwest of South Point.

August 17

- 00:00 UTC (2:00 p.m. HST, August 16) at 15.5°N 160.8°W – Hurricane Dora weakens back to Category 1 intensity about 415 mi (665 km) southwest of South Point.
- 06:00 UTC (11:00 p.m. PDT, August 16) at 12.4°N 113.1°W – Tropical Depression Ten-E forms from a tropical wave about 460 mi (740 km) south-southwest of Socorro Island.

August 18

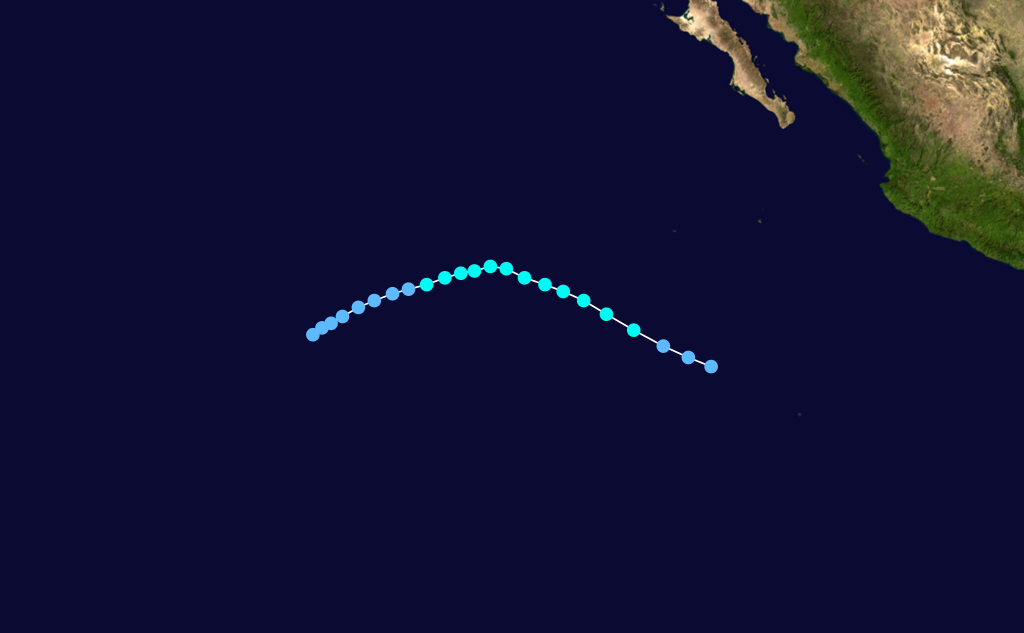
Storm path of Tropical Storm Fernanda

- 00:00 UTC (5:00 p.m. PDT, August 17) at 14.0°N 116.5°W – Tropical Depression Ten-E strengthens into Tropical Storm Fernanda about 495 mi (795 km) southwest of Socorro Island.

August 19

- 12:00 UTC (5:00 a.m. PDT) at 16.7°N 122.1°W – Tropical Storm Fernanda attains its peak intensity, with maximum sustained winds of 65 mph (100 km/h) and a minimum central pressure of 994 mbar (29.35 inHg), about 750 mi (1,205 km) west of Socorro Island.

August 20

- 00:00 UTC (2:00 p.m. HST, August 19) at 17.9°N 179.4°E – Hurricane Dora weakens into a tropical storm as it crosses the International Date Line about 735 mi (1,185 km) west of Johnston Atoll, entering the Western Pacific basin and becoming part of the 1999 Pacific typhoon season.

August 21

- 00:00 UTC (5:00 p.m. PDT, August 20) at 15.8°N 126.4°W – Tropical Storm Fernanda weakens into a tropical depression about 1,035 mi (1,665 km) west of Socorro Island.

August 22

- 18:00 UTC (11:00 a.m. PDT) at 13.8°N 130.6°W – Tropical Depression Fernanda is last noted as a tropical cyclone about 1,345 mi (2,165 km) west of Socorro Island, dissipating shortly thereafter.

August 23

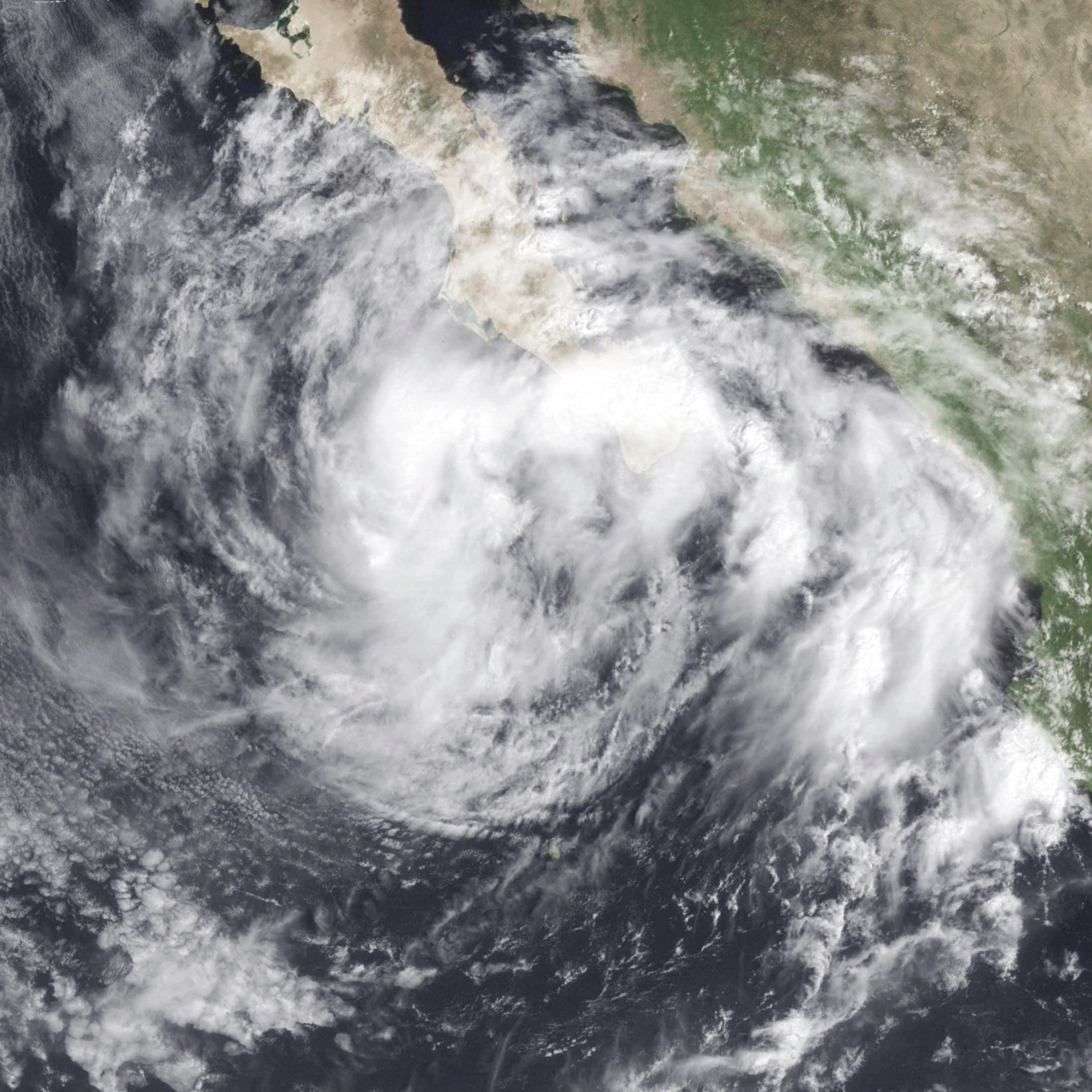
Tropical Depression Eleven-E at peak intensity on August 23

- 18:00 UTC (11:00 a.m. PDT) at 22.0°N 111.3°W – Tropical Depression Eleven-E forms from a broad low-pressure area about 105 mi (165 km) southwest of the southern tip of the Baja California peninsula. It is already at its peak intensity, with maximum sustained winds of 35 mph (55 km/h) and a minimum central pressure of 1000 mbar (29.53 inHg).

August 24

- 12:00 UTC (5:00 a.m. PDT) at 22.6°N 112.9°W – Tropical Depression Eleven-E is last noted as a tropical cyclone about 190 mi (305 km) west of the southern tip of the Baja California peninsula, dissipating shortly thereafter.

=== September ===
September 5

- 12:00 UTC (5:00 a.m. PDT) at 18.6°N 105.1°W – A tropical depression forms from an interaction between a monsoon-like disturbance and a tropical wave about 60 mi (95 km) west-southwest of Manzanillo.
- 18:00 UTC (11:00 a.m. PDT) at 19.2°N 105.4°W – The recently formed tropical depression strengthens into Tropical Storm Greg about 70 mi (110 km) west of Manzanillo.

September 6

- 18:00 UTC (11:00 a.m. PDT) at 21.5°N 108.4°W – Tropical Storm Greg strengthens into a Category 1 hurricane about 140 mi (220 km) southeast of the southern tip of the Baja California peninsula.

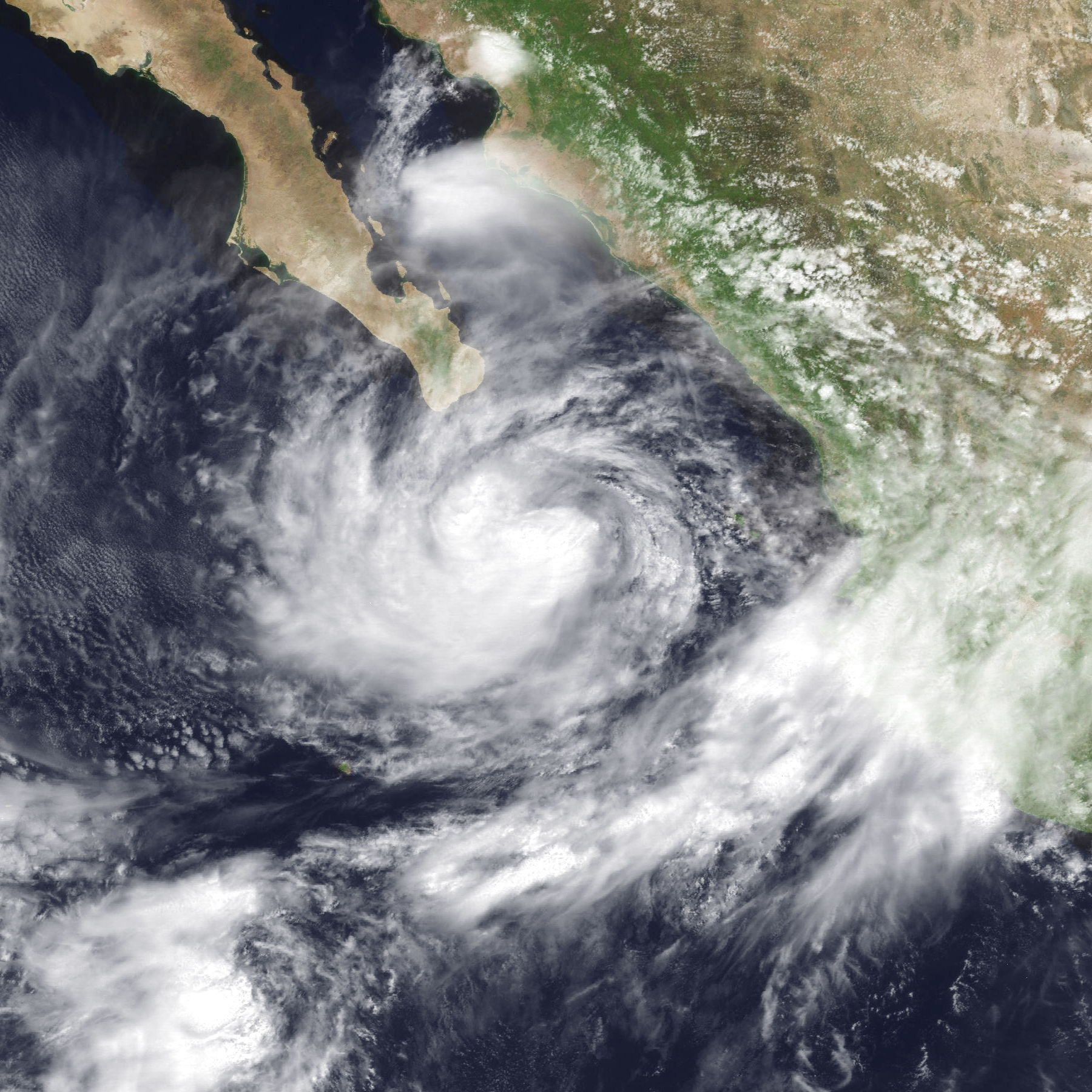
Hurricane Greg approaching the Baja California peninsula on September 6

September 7

- 00:00 UTC (5:00 p.m. PDT, September 6) at 21.9°N 109.0°W – Hurricane Greg attains its peak intensity, with maximum sustained winds of 75 mph (120 km/h) and a minimum central pressure of 986 mbar (29.12 inHg), about 90 mi (150 km) southeast of the southern tip of the Baja California peninsula.
- 18:00 UTC (11:00 a.m. PDT) at 22.8°N 109.7°W – Hurricane Greg weakens into a tropical storm about 15 mi (30 km) east-southeast of the southern tip of the Baja California peninsula.
- 21:00 UTC (2:00 p.m. PDT) at 22.9°N 110.0°W – Tropical Storm Greg makes landfall near the southern tip of the Baja California peninsula, or near Cabo San Lucas, Baja California Sur, with maximum sustained winds of 60 mph (95 km/h) and a minimum central pressure of 994 mbar (29.35 inHg), and re-emerges over the Pacific Ocean shortly thereafter.

September 8

- 18:00 UTC (11:00 a.m. PDT) at 23.0°N 111.3°W – Tropical Storm Greg weakens into a tropical depression about 85 mi (140 km) west of the southern tip of the Baja California peninsula.

September 9

- 18:00 UTC (11:00 a.m. PDT) at 23.2°N 112.3°W – Tropical Depression Greg is last noted as a tropical cyclone about 150 mi (240 km) west of the southern tip of the Baja California peninsula, dissipating shortly thereafter.

September 17

- 06:00 UTC (11:00 p.m. PDT, September 16) at 15.2°N 107.1°W – A tropical depression forms from a tropical wave about 565 mi (905 km) south-southeast of the southern tip of the Baja California peninsula.

September 18

- 12:00 UTC (5:00 a.m. PDT) at 16.2°N 111.3°W – The recently formed tropical depression strengthens into Tropical Storm Hilary about 470 mi (760 km) south of the southern tip of the Baja California peninsula.

September 20

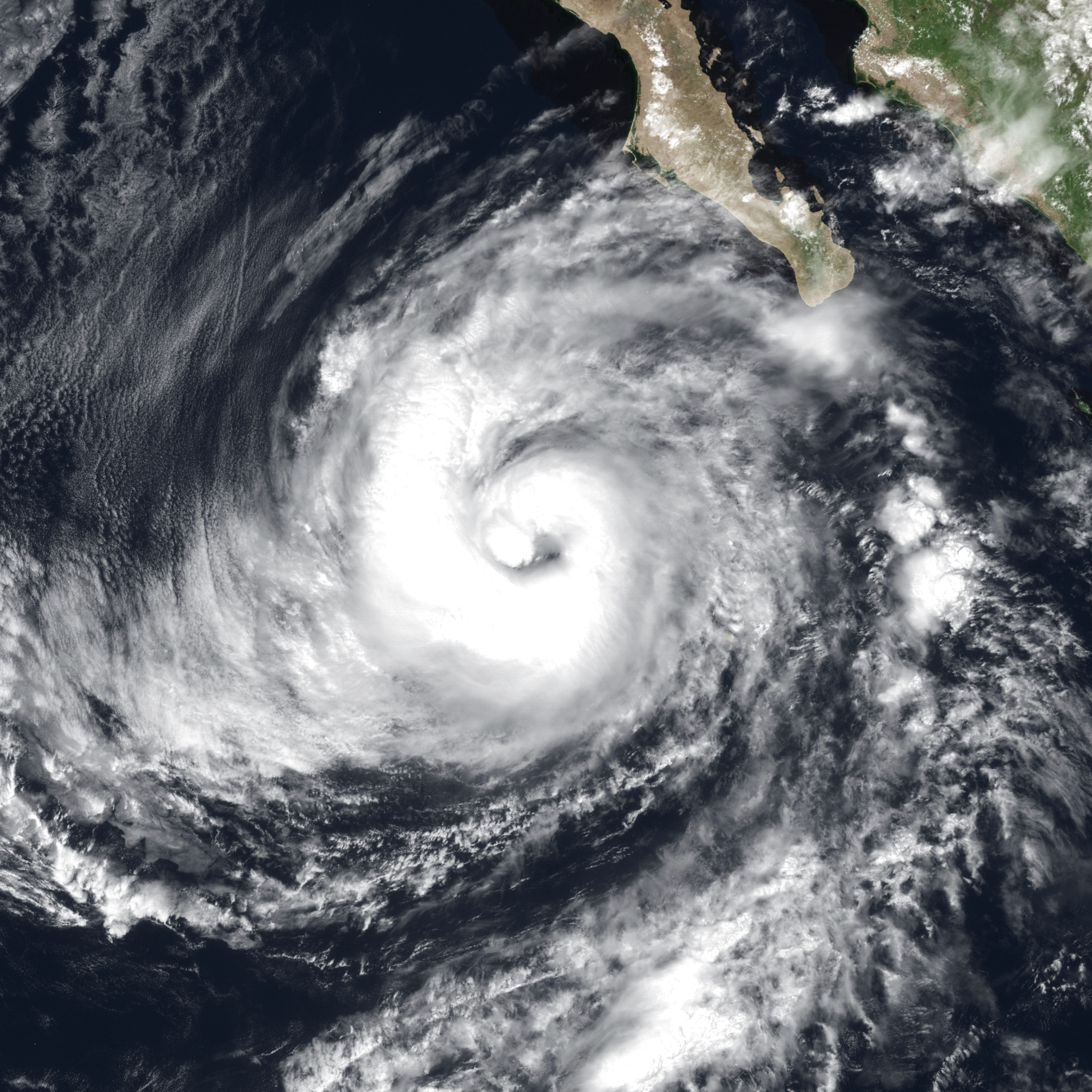
Tropical Storm Hilary shortly before becoming a hurricane late on September 19

- 00:00 UTC (5:00 p.m. PDT, September 19) at 20.7°N 113.6°W – Tropical Storm Hilary strengthens into a Category 1 hurricane about 275 mi (445 km) southwest of the southern tip of the Baja California peninsula.
- 06:00 UTC (11:00 p.m. PDT, September 19) at 21.6°N 114.0°W – Hurricane Hilary attains its peak intensity, with maximum sustained winds of 75 mph (120 km/h) and a minimum central pressure of 987 mbar (29.15 inHg), about 270 mi (435 km) west-southwest of the southern tip of the Baja California peninsula.
- 12:00 UTC (5:00 a.m. PDT) at 22.4°N 114.3°W – Hurricane Hilary weakens into a tropical storm about 205 mi (335 km) southwest of Cabo San Lázaro, Baja California Sur.

September 21

- 12:00 UTC (5:00 a.m. PDT) at 24.9°N 114.6°W – Tropical Storm Hilary weakens into a tropical depression about 145 mi (230 km) west of Cabo San Lázaro, and later dissipates.

=== October ===
October 8

- 12:00 UTC (5:00 a.m. PDT) at 17.3°N 105.0°W – Tropical Depression Fourteen-E forms from a tropical wave about 125 mi (205 km) south-southwest of Manzanillo.
- 18:00 UTC (11:00 a.m. PDT) at 17.7°N 105.1°W – Tropical Depression Fourteen-E strengthens into Tropical Storm Irwin about 110 mi (175 km) south-southwest of Manzanillo.

October 9

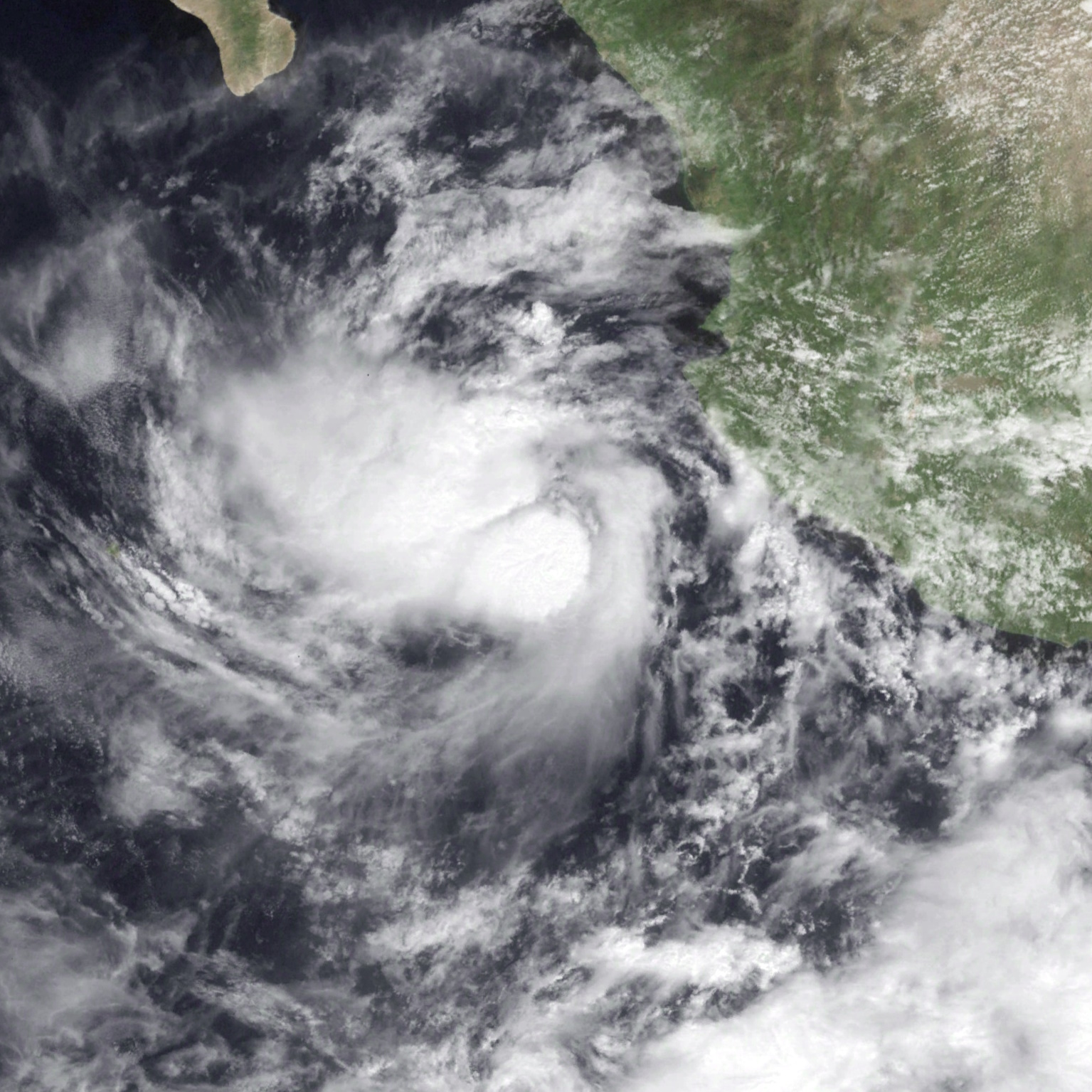
Tropical Storm Irwin near Mexico at peak intensity on October 9

- 18:00 UTC (11:00 a.m. PDT) at 19.0°N 107.1°W – Tropical Storm Irwin attains its peak intensity, with maximum sustained winds of 60 mph (95 km/h) and a minimum central pressure of 996 mbar (29.41 inHg), about 185 mi (295 km) west of Manzanillo.

October 11

- 00:00 UTC (5:00 p.m. PDT, October 10) at 18.4°N 111.3°W – Tropical Storm Irwin weakens into a tropical depression about 320 mi (520 km) south-southwest of the southern tip of the Baja California peninsula, and later dissipates.

=== November ===
There were no tropical cyclones in November.

November 30

- The 1999 Pacific hurricane season ends.

== See also ==
- Timeline of the 1999 Atlantic hurricane season
- List of Pacific hurricanes
- Pacific hurricane season
- Tropical cyclones in 1999
