= Chicago Mercantile Exchange Hurricane Index =

The Chicago Mercantile Exchange Hurricane Index (CMEHI) is an index which describes the potential for damage from an Atlantic hurricane in the United States. The CMEHI is used as the basis for trading hurricane futures and options on the Chicago Mercantile Exchange (CME). It is very similar to the Hurricane Severity Index, which also factors both size and intensity of a hurricane.

== Index calculation ==
The CMEHI takes as input two variables: the maximum sustained wind speed of a hurricane in miles per hour and the radius to hurricane-force winds of a hurricane in miles (i.e. how far from the center of the hurricane winds of 74 mph or greater are experienced). If the maximum sustained wind speed is denoted by V and the radius to hurricane-force winds is denoted by R then the CMEHI is calculated as follows:

$$\text{CMEHI} = \left ( \frac{V}{V_0} \right )^3 + \frac{3}{2}\left ( \frac{R}{R_0} \right ) \left ( \frac{V}{V_0} \right )^2$$

where the subscript 0 denotes reference values. For use on the CME, the reference values of 74 mph and 60 miles are used for the maximum sustained wind speed and radius of hurricane-force winds respectively.

== Index history and data ==
The development of the CMEHI was based on work published by Lakshmi Kantha at the Department of Aerospace Studies at the University of Colorado in Boulder, Colorado. Kantha's paper in Eos developed a number of indices based on various characteristics of hurricanes. The ReAdvisory team at the reinsurance broker RK Carvill used the basics of the Kantha paper to develop an index which became the Carvill Hurricane Index (CHI). In 2009, the scale was renamed the Chicago Mercantile Exchange Hurricane Index (CMEHI).

The data for the CMEHI comes from the public advisories issued for named storms by the National Hurricane Center. Specifically, to determine the maximum sustained wind speed, the following verbiage is looked for:

MAXIMUM SUSTAINED WINDS ARE NEAR XX MPH

To determine the radius to hurricane-force winds, the following phrase is looked for:

HURRICANE FORCE WINDS EXTEND OUTWARD UP TO XX MILES

For example, Advisory 23A for Hurricane Katrina at 1 p.m. Central daylight time on Sunday, August 28, 2005, gave the maximum sustained wind speed of 175 mph and the radius of hurricane-force winds of 105 miles resulting in a CMEHI value of 27.9.

== Data ==
Public advisories from the National Hurricane Center are archived back to 1998. The table below lists the CMEHI values for all the landfalling hurricanes since 1998 based on the NHC Public Advisories, and uses alternate sources for hurricanes between 1989 and 1998.

CMEHI indices of historical storms (1989 – present)
Name	Year	Landfall	NHC advisory number	Windspeed at/near landfall (operational)	Radius of hurricane–force winds at/near landfall	CMEHI index	Ref(s)
1 Jerry	1989	Texas	N/A	85 mph (140 km/h)	25 mi (40 km)	2.3	
4 Hugo	1989	U.S. Virgin Islands	N/A	140 mph (220 km/h)	85 mi (135 km)	14.4	
3 Hugo	1989	Puerto Rico	N/A	125 mph (205 km/h)	85 mi (135 km)	10.9	
4 Hugo	1989	South Carolina	N/A	140 mph (220 km/h)	140 mi (225 km)	19.3	
4 Andrew	1992	Florida	N/A	145 mph (230 km/h)	25 mi (40 km)	9.9	
1 Erin	1995	Florida	N/A	85 mph (140 km/h)	35 mi (55 km)	2.7	
2 Marilyn	1995	U.S. Virgin Islands	N/A	110 mph (175 km/h)	30 mi (50 km)	4.9	
3 Opal	1995	Florida	N/A	115 mph (185 km/h)	60 mi (95 km)	7.4	
2 Bertha	1996	North Carolina	N/A	105 mph (165 km/h)	115 mi (185 km)	8.6	
3 Fran	1996	North Carolina	44	115 mph (185 km/h)	175 mi (280 km)	14.3	
1 Hortense	1996	Puerto Rico	N/A	80 mph (130 km/h)	60 mi (95 km)	3.0	
1 Danny	1997	Louisiana	N/A	75 mph (120 km/h)	20 mi (30 km)	1.5	
2 Bonnie	1998	North Carolina	33	100 mph (155 km/h)	115 mi (185 km)	7.7	
1 Earl	1998	Florida	11A	80 mph (130 km/h)	115 mi (185 km)	4.6	
3 Georges	1998	Puerto Rico	26B	115 mph (185 km/h)	85 mi (135 km)	8.9	
2 Georges	1998	Mississippi	52	105 mph (165 km/h)	45 mi (70 km)	5.1	
3 Bret	1999	Texas	17A	125 mph (205 km/h)	40 mi (65 km)	7.7	
2 Floyd	1999	North Carolina	34A	110 mph (175 km/h)	115 mi (185 km)	9.6	
1 Irene	1999	Florida	10	75 mph (120 km/h)	45 mi (70 km)	2.1	
1 Lili	2002	Louisiana	49	90 mph (150 km/h)	70 mi (115 km)	4.4	
1 Claudette	2003	Texas	28A	80 mph (130 km/h)	30 mi (50 km)	2.1	
2 Isabel	2003	North Carolina	49A	100 mph (155 km/h)	115 mi (185 km)	7.7	
4 Charley	2004	Florida	18	145 mph (230 km/h)	30 mi (50 km)	10.4	
2 Frances	2004	Florida	44A	105 mph (165 km/h)	75 mi (120 km)	6.6	
4 Ivan	2004	Alabama	55B	130 mph (215 km/h)	105 mi (170 km)	13.5	
3 Jeanne	2004	Florida	49B	115 mph (185 km/h)	70 mi (115 km)	8.0	
3 Dennis	2005	Florida	25B	120 mph (195 km/h)	40 mi (65 km)	6.9	
1 Katrina	2005	Florida	9	75 mph (120 km/h)	15 mi (25 km)	1.4	
4 Katrina	2005	Louisiana	26A	145 mph (230 km/h)	120 mi (195 km)	19.0	
3 Rita	2005	Texas	26B	120 mph (195 km/h)	85 mi (135 km)	9.9	
3 Wilma	2005	Florida	36	125 mph (205 km/h)	90 mi (145 km)	11.2	
1 Humberto	2007	Texas	4	80 mph (130 km/h)	15 mi (25 km)	1.7	
2 Dolly	2008	Texas	13A	100 mph (155 km/h)	25 mi (40 km)	3.6	
2 Gustav	2008	Louisiana	31B	110 mph (175 km/h)	70 mi (115 km)	7.2	
2 Ike	2008	Texas	48B	110 mph (175 km/h)	120 mi (195 km)	9.9	
1 Irene	2011	Puerto Rico	7	75 mph (120 km/h)	15 mi (25 km)	1.4	
1 Irene	2011	North Carolina	28A	85 mph (140 km/h)	90 mi (145 km)	4.5	
1 Isaac	2012	Louisiana	33	80 mph (130 km/h)	60 mi (95 km)	3.0	
2 Arthur	2014	North Carolina	13	100 mph (155 km/h)	40 mi (65 km)	4.3	
1 Hermine	2016	Florida	19A	80 mph (130 km/h)	45 mi (70 km)	2.6	
1 Matthew	2016	South Carolina	42	75 mph (120 km/h)	25 mi (40 km)	1.6	
4 Harvey	2017	Texas	23	130 mph (215 km/h)	40 mi (65 km)	8.5	
4 Irma	2017	Florida	45A	130 mph (215 km/h)	80 mi (130 km)	11.6	
4 Maria	2017	Puerto Rico	17	155 mph (250 km/h)	60 mi (95 km)	15.8	
1 Nate	2017	Louisiana	14A	85 mph (140 km/h)	40 mi (65 km)	2.8	
1 Florence	2018	North Carolina	61	80 mph (130 km/h)	70 mi (115 km)	3.3	
4 Michael	2018	Florida	16A	155 mph (250 km/h)	45 mi (70 km)	14.1	
1 Barry	2019	Louisiana	13	75 mph (120 km/h)	45 mi (70 km)	2.1	
1 Dorian	2019	North Carolina	52A	90 mph (150 km/h)	45 mi (70 km)	3.5	
1 Hanna	2020	Texas	12	90 mph (150 km/h)	30 mi (50 km)	2.9	
1 Isaias	2020	North Carolina	28	85 mph (140 km/h)	25 mi (40 km)	2.3	
4 Laura	2020	Louisiana	29A	150 mph (240 km/h)	60 mi (95 km)	14.5	
2 Sally	2020	Alabama	21	105 mph (165 km/h)	40 mi (65 km)	4.9	
2 Delta	2020	Louisiana	Update	100 mph (155 km/h)	40 mi (65 km)	4.3	
2 Zeta	2020	Louisiana	17	110 mph (175 km/h)	35 mi (55 km)	5.2	
4 Ida	2021	Louisiana	14	150 mph (240 km/h)	50 mi (80 km)	13.5	
1 Nicholas	2021	Texas	8A	75 mph (120 km/h)	25 mi (40 km)	1.6	
1 Fiona	2022	Puerto Rico	17A	85 mph (140 km/h)	30 mi (50 km)	2.5	
4 Ian	2022	Florida	24A	155 mph (250 km/h)	45 mi (70 km)	14.1	
1 Ian	2022	South Carolina	33	85 mph (140 km/h)	70 mi (115 km)	3.8	
4 Idalia	2023	Florida	15	130 mph (215 km/h)	25 mi (40 km)	7.4	
1 Beryl	2024	Texas	39	80 mph (130 km/h)	45 mi (70 km)	2.6	
1 Debby	2024	Florida	12	80 mph (130 km/h)	25 mi (40 km)	2.0	
2 Francine	2024	Louisiana	13	100 mph (155 km/h)	40 mi (65 km)	4.3	
4 Helene	2024	Florida	15	140 mph (220 km/h)	60 mi (95 km)	12.1	

Prior to 1998, the data becomes sparse. However, using data from the HURSAT database at NOAA it is possible to construct a set of CMEHI values for storms back to 1983.

Modeled data is available from a number of sources:

- Seasonal data, suitable for use in the insurance and reinsurance community, is provided by AIR Worldwide
- Atmospheric and Environmental Research, Inc. provide CMEHI values for live storms through their hCast-SR product
- MDA Federal provide a real-time CMEHI forecasting product
