= 1999 Atlantic hurricane season =

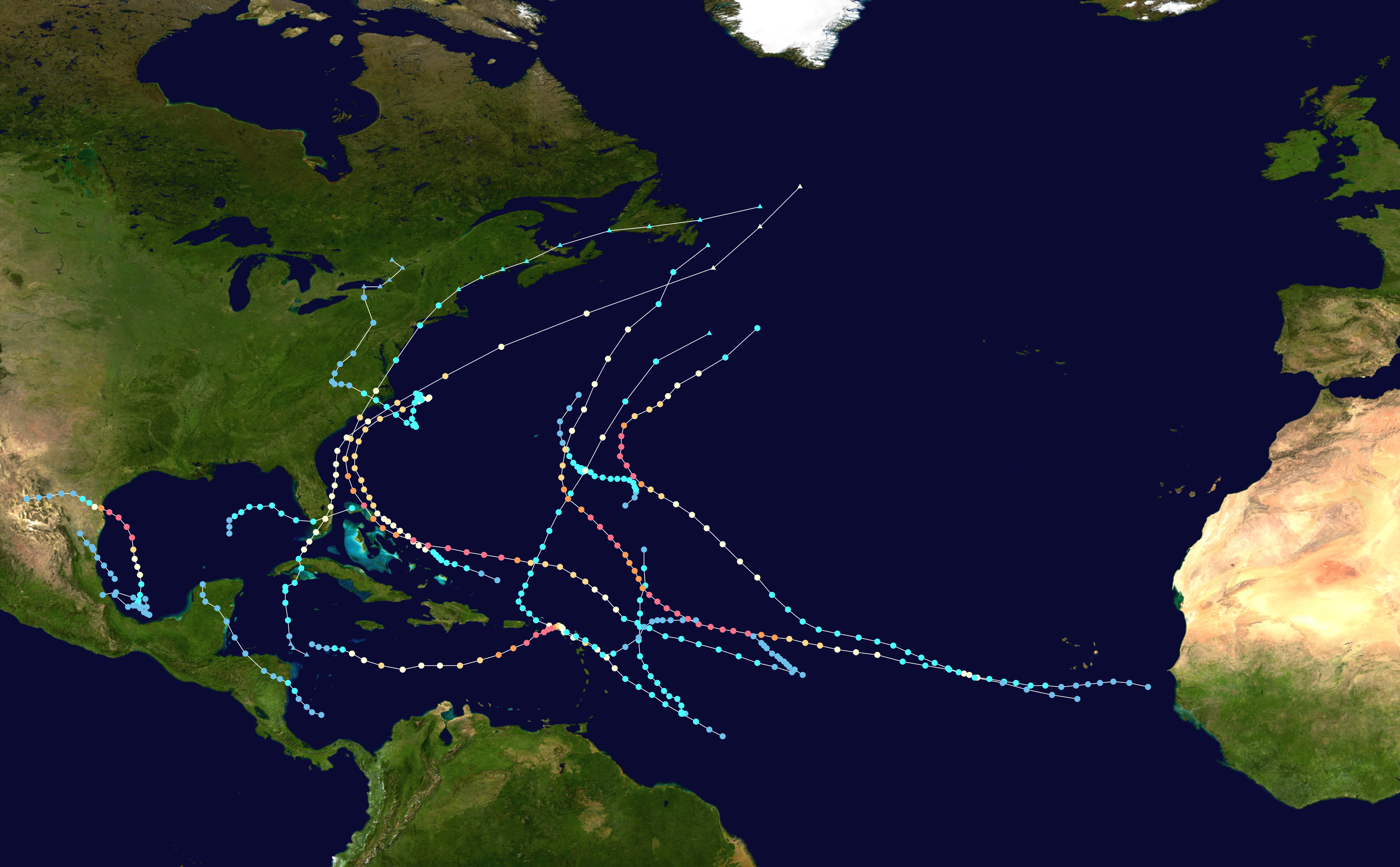
- Season summary map

Seasonal boundaries
- First system formed: June 11, 1999
- Last system dissipated: November 23, 1999

Strongest storm
- Name: Floyd
  - Maximum winds: 155 mph (250 km/h) (1-minute sustained)
  - Lowest pressure: 921 mbar (hPa; 27.2 inHg)

Seasonal statistics
- Total depressions: 16
- Total storms: 12
- Hurricanes: 8
- Major hurricanes (Cat. 3+): 5
- ACE: 177
- Total fatalities: 775 total
- Total damage: $8.78 billion (1999 USD)

Related articles
- Timeline of the 1999 Atlantic hurricane season; 1999 Pacific hurricane season; 1999 Pacific typhoon season; 1999 North Indian Ocean cyclone season

The 1999 Atlantic hurricane season was a very active, destructive and deadly season in which 16 tropical cyclones formed. Among them, 12 became named storms, of which 8 became hurricanes. Five hurricanes intensified further into major hurricanes. (Note: A major hurricane is one that reaches Category 3 intensity or higher on the Saffir–Simpson scale) The season featured a record-tying five Category 4 hurricanes. This high activity is mostly due to a persistent La Niña that developed in the latter half of the previous year. The season officially began on June 1, and ended on November 30. These dates conventionally delimit the period of each year when most tropical cyclones form in the Atlantic basin. The first storm, Arlene, formed on June 11 to the southeast of Bermuda. It meandered slowly for a week and caused no impact on land. Other tropical cyclones that did not affect land were Hurricane Cindy, Tropical Storm Emily, and Tropical Depression Twelve. Localized or otherwise minor damage occurred from Hurricanes Bret, Gert, and Jose, and tropical storms Harvey and Katrina.

The most significant storm of the season was Hurricane Floyd, a strong Category 4 hurricane that caused devastating flooding along the East Coast of the United States, especially in North Carolina. Damage from the storm totaled approximately $6.5 billion (1999 USD) (Note: All damage figures are in 1999 USD, unless otherwise noted) and there were at least 77 fatalities, making it the deadliest hurricane in the United States since Hurricane Agnes in 1972. Flooding from Floyd in North Carolina followed Hurricane Dennis, a slow and erratic–moving storm that dropped heavy rainfall in the eastern portion of the state. Tropical Depression Eleven in October contributed to extreme flooding in Mexico, which left 636 people dead and caused $491.3 million in damage, though impact could not be distinguished from the storm itself. Hurricane Irene caused extensive flooding in Cuba and Florida, with lesser effects in the Bahamas and North Carolina. Irene was the second–costliest storm of the season, with about $800 million in damage. Hurricane Lenny was an unusual eastward–moving storm in the Caribbean Sea and a strong late–season storm. It caused extensive damage in the Lesser Antilles in the month of November. Collectively, the storms of the 1999 Atlantic hurricane season caused at least 775 fatalities and $8.78 billion in losses.

== Seasonal forecasts ==
Predictions of tropical activity in the 1999 season
Source	Date	Named storms	Hurricanes	Major hurricanes	Ref
Average (1981–2010)		12.1	6.4	2.7
Record high activity		30	15	7†
Record low activity		1	0†	0†
CSU	December 4, 1998	14	9	4
WRC	Early 1999	10	6	N/A
CSU	April 7, 1999	14	9	4
TSR	June 1, 1999	12	7	2
CSU	June 4, 1999	14	9	4
CSU	August 6, 1999	14	9	4
	Actual activity	12	8	5
† Most recent of several such occurrences. (See all)

Ahead of and during each hurricane season, various national meteorological services, scientific agencies, and noted hurricane experts issue forecasts of hurricane activity. These include forecasters from the United States National Oceanic and Atmospheric Administration (NOAA)'s National Hurricane and Climate Prediction Center's, William M. Gray and his associates at Colorado State University (CSU), as well as Weather Research Center (WRC) and Tropical Storm Risk (TSR), then known as TSUNAMI. The forecasts include weekly or monthly assessments of the significant factors that help determine the number of tropical storms, hurricanes, and major hurricanes within a particular year.

Gray and his team at CSU issued their initial season outlook on December 4, 1998, predicting fourteen named storms, nine hurricanes, and four major hurricanes. The three main factors for this above average season forecast cited included a continuation of abnormally warm sea surface temperatures, the probability that La Niña conditions would remain, and that the quasi-biennial oscillation (QBO) winds would be in a westerly phase. Early in 1999, WRC issued its forecast for the season, projecting ten named storms and six hurricanes, but no prediction on the number of major hurricanes. In subsequent outlooks from Gray and his associates in April, June, and August, the predictions were unchanged.

On April 7, CSU noted that the probability of a major hurricane landfall in the United States was 72%, including a 54% chance on the East Coast and a 40% likelihood on the Gulf Coast. In their outlook on May 27, experts at NOAA noted that an above average season was a strong possibility. An addition to a La Niña, vertical wind shear would be decreased across much of the Caribbean Sea and tropical Atlantic Ocean, and a favorable jet pattern for tropical waves to develop into tropical cyclones. On June 1, TSR predicted that there would be 12 named storms, 7 hurricanes, and 2 major hurricanes.

As stated by NOAA and CSU, an average Atlantic hurricane season between 1981 and –2010 contains roughly 12 tropical storms, 6 hurricanes, 3 major hurricanes, and an accumulated cyclone energy (ACE) Index of 66–103 units. NOAA typically categorizes a season as either above-average, average, of below-average based on the cumulative ACE Index; however, the number of tropical storms, hurricanes, and major hurricanes within a hurricane season is considered occasionally as well.

== Seasonal summary ==
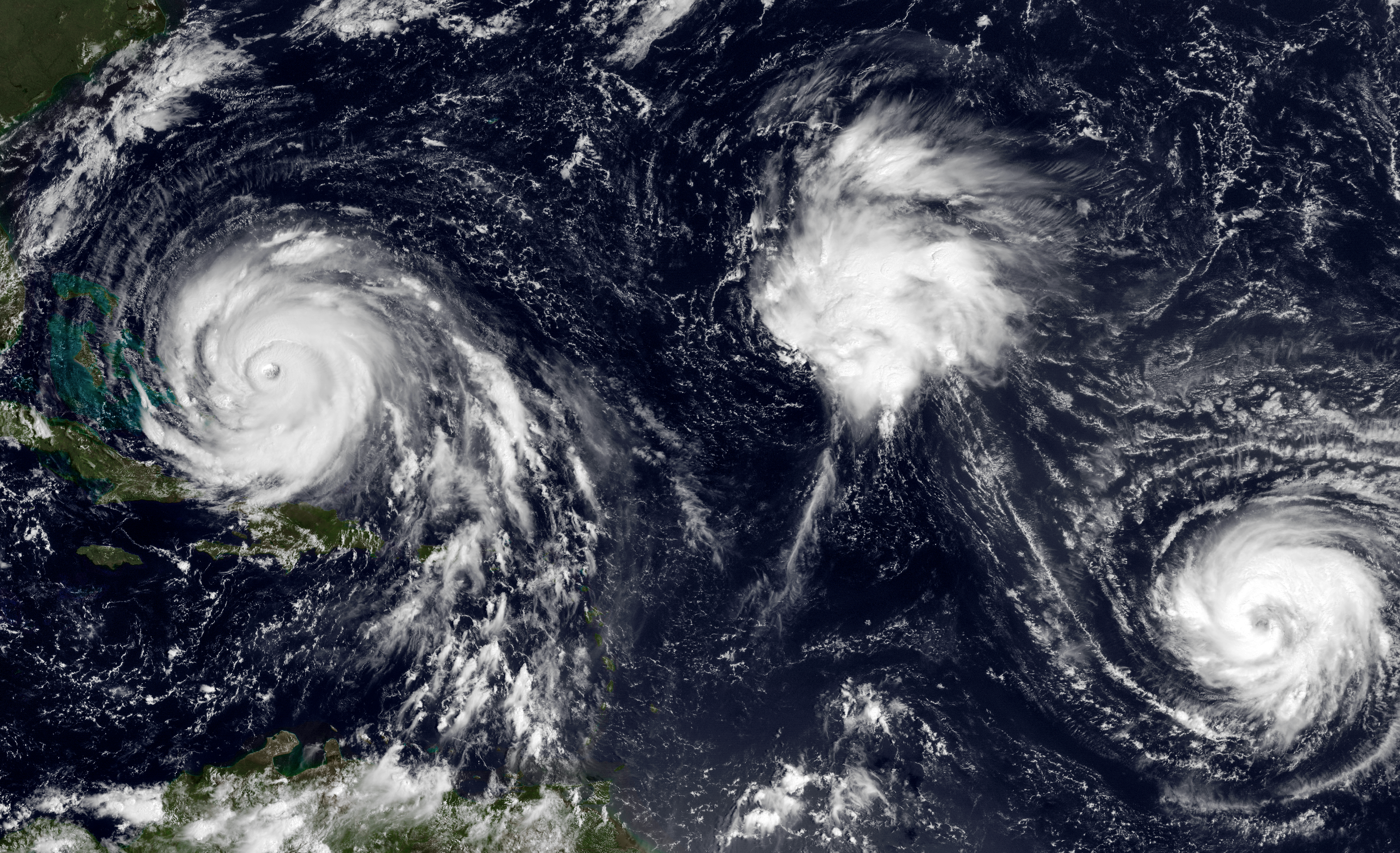
Hurricanes Floyd (left) and Gert (right) pictured on September 13

The Atlantic hurricane season officially began on June 1, 1999, and the first tropical cyclone developed on June 11. It was an above–average season in which 16 tropical cyclones formed. Twelve depressions attained tropical storm status, and eight of these became hurricanes. Five hurricanes intensified further into major hurricanes. The season featured a record-tying five Category 4 hurricanes, later tied again in 2005 and 2020. These were Bret, Cindy, Floyd, Gert, and Hurricane Lenny. The last storm of the season, Hurricane Lenny, dissipated on November 23, which was about a week before the official season ending on November 30, 1999.

A persistent La Niña that developed during the previous season was attributed to the above average activity. Between August and October, there was very low wind shear over the Caribbean Sea and western Atlantic Ocean, attributed to a combination of abnormal upper-level easterly winds and low-level westerly winds. Six hurricanes and two tropical storms made landfall during the season and caused at least 123 deaths and approximately $8.19 billion in damage. Hurricane Gert also caused damage and fatalities, despite not making landfall.

Overall, the season's activity was reflected with a high cumulative accumulated cyclone energy (ACE) rating of 177. ACE is, broadly speaking, a measure of the power of the hurricane multiplied by the length of time it existed, so storms that last a long time, as well as particularly strong hurricanes, have high ACEs. It is only calculated for full advisories on tropical systems at or exceeding 34 knots (39 mph; 63 km/h) or tropical storm strength.

== Systems ==
=== Tropical Storm Arlene ===
- Tropical storm (SSHWS)
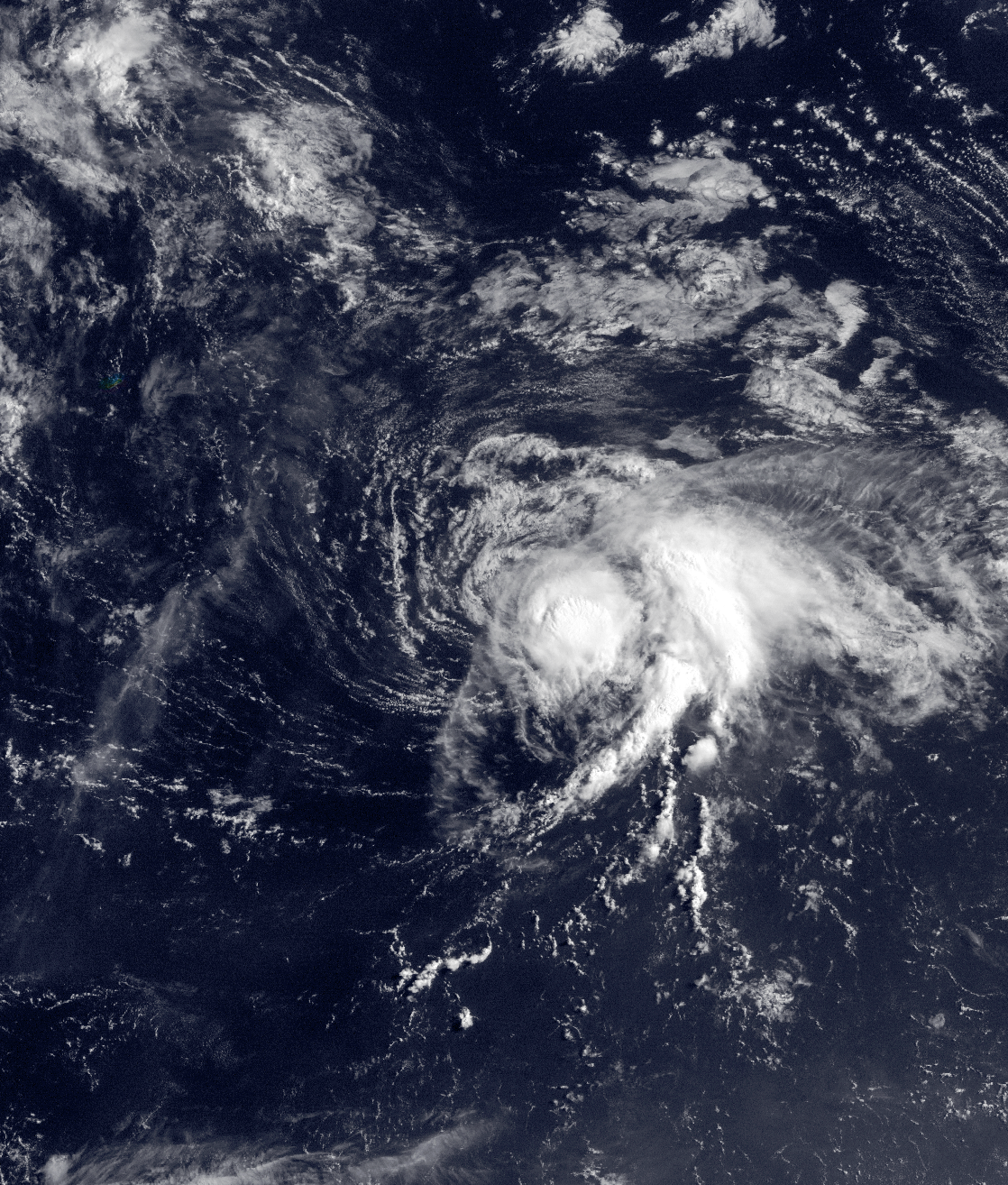
- Duration: June 11 – June 18
- Peak intensity: 60 mph (95 km/h) (1-min); 1006 mbar (hPa)

Along a diffuse front, a broad area of low pressure in association with an upper-level low was noted several hundred miles northeast of Puerto Rico on June 8. After the circulation reformed within the area of stronger convection, the NHC estimated that Tropical Depression One developed at 18:00 UTC on June 11 about 535 mi (861 km) southeast of Bermuda. Initially, the system resembled a subtropical cyclone, due to its frontal characteristics. The nascent depression drifted northward for 24 hours, and during this time, it strengthened and was upgraded to Tropical Storm Arlene at 12:00 UTC on June 12, based on Dvorak satellite classifications. The storm intensified further to its peak intensity at 00:00 UTC on June 13, with estimated maximum sustained winds of 60 mph (97 km/h) and a minimum barometric pressure of 1,006 mbar (29.7 inHg), based on ship reports and satellite. Subsequently, weakening due to westerly wind shear, Arlene tracking westward on June 13 and turned northwest the following day. Because the steering current became poorly defined, it drifted starting on June 15, and executed a small cyclonic loop later that day. At 00:00 UTC on June 17, Arlene was downgraded to a tropical depression. Later that day, it passed about 115 mi (185 km) east of Bermuda, where gale-force winds and abnormally high tides were observed. The depression weakened further due to decreasing sea surface temperatures and dissipated early on June 18.

=== Tropical Depression Two ===
- Tropical depression (SSHWS)
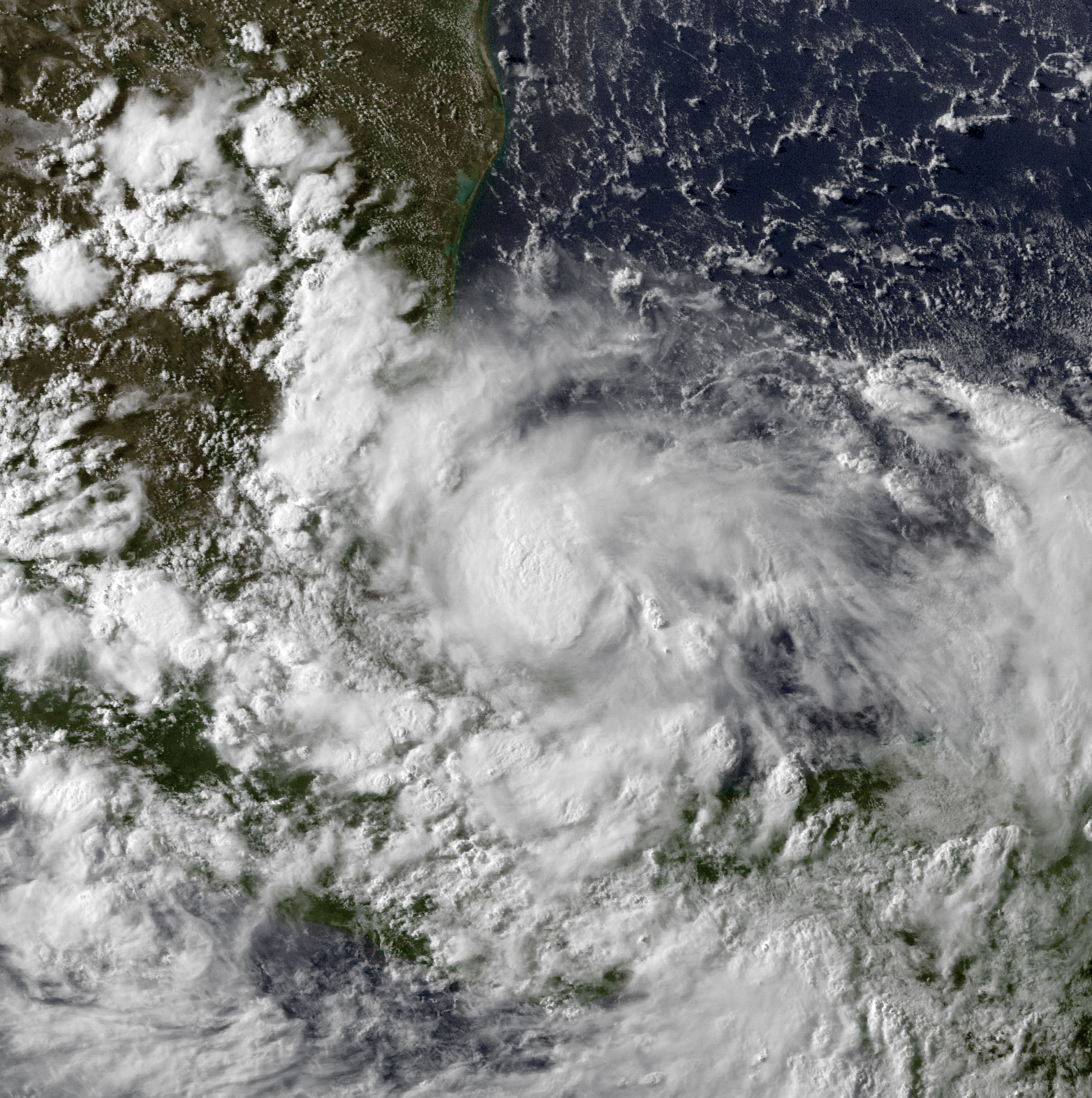
- Duration: July 2 – July 3
- Peak intensity: 35 mph (55 km/h) (1-min); 1004 mbar (hPa)

A tropical wave crossed the west coast of Africa on June 20. As the wave moved into the western Caribbean Sea on June 30, a broad cyclonic turning was noted. The system moved over the Yucatán Peninsula on July 1, a day before emerging into the Bay of Campeche as a weak low pressure area. Later on July 2, deep convection became more organized while the system was centered over the southwestern Gulf of Mexico. By 18:00 UTC, the low developed into Tropical Depression Two. Around 04:00 UTC on July 3, the depression made landfall about 40 mi (64 km) south-southeast of Tuxpan, Veracruz, with winds of 35 mph (56 km/h). Eight hours later, it dissipated over the mountains of Mexico. The depression dropped heavy rain on the area amounting to a maximum of 20.37 in (517 mm) at Tanzabaca, San Luis Potosí. In some areas, up to 12.49 in (317 mm) of precipitation fell in 24 hours.

=== Hurricane Bret ===
- Category 4 hurricane (SSHWS)
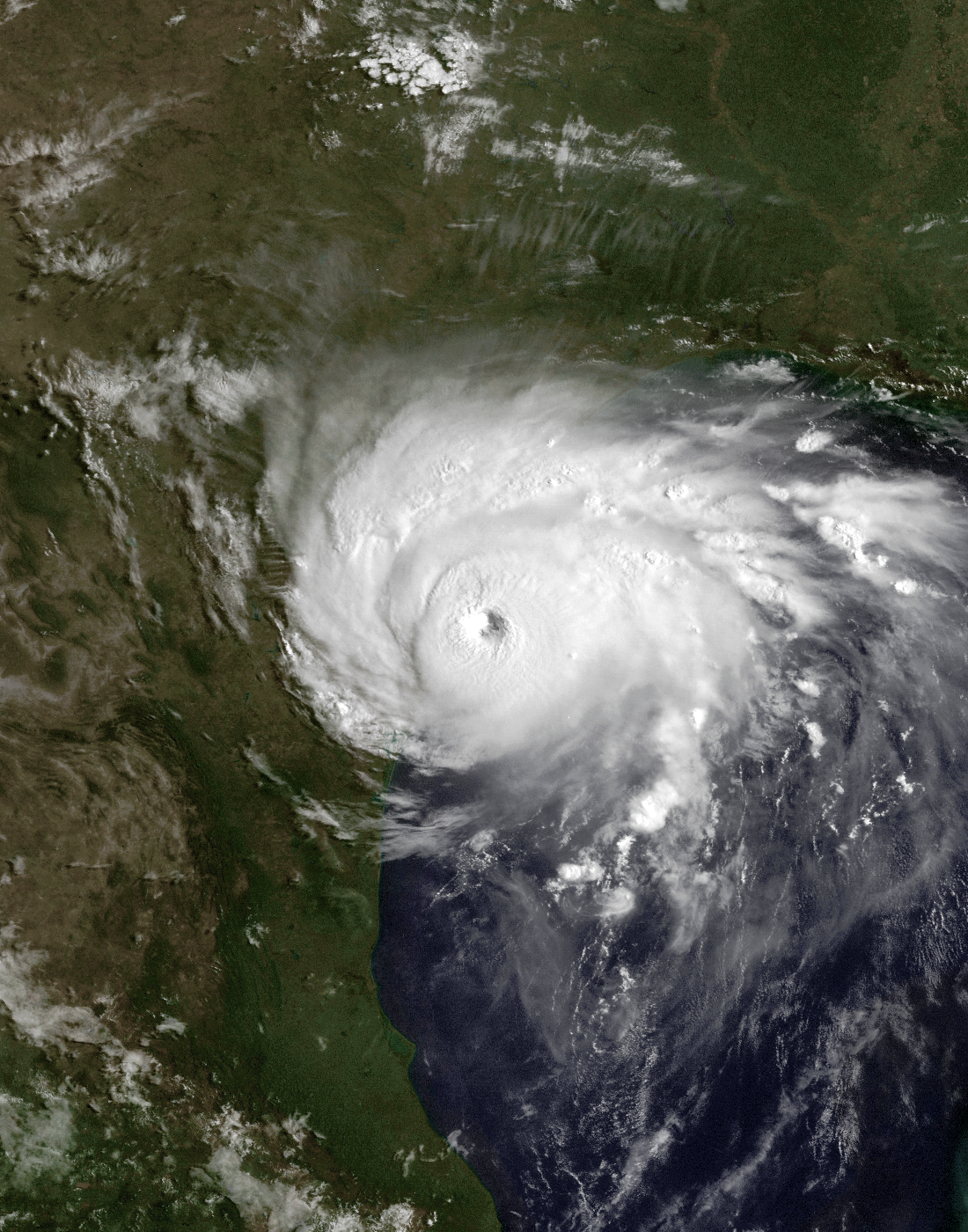
- Duration: August 18 – August 25
- Peak intensity: 145 mph (230 km/h) (1-min); 944 mbar (hPa)

Late on August 18, a tropical wave in the Bay of Campeche spawned Tropical Depression Three. The depression drifted and was initially hampered by wind shear. By late on August 19, the depression was upgraded to Tropical Storm Bret amid more favorable atmosphere conditions. Bret then moved generally northward and strengthened into a hurricane early on August 21. Bret strengthened significantly over the next 36 hours, peaking as a 145 mph (233 km/h) Category 4 hurricane with a minimum barometric pressure of 944 mbar (27.9 inHg) on August 22. Thereafter, the storm began to weaken while curving west-northwestward. At 00:00 UTC on August 23, Bret made landfall in central Padre Island, Texas, as a Category 3 hurricane with winds of 115 mph (185 km/h). After moving inland, the storm weakened quickly, falling to tropical depression status on August 24. Early the following day, Bret dissipated near the border of Coahuila and Chihuahua.

Bret was a small tropical cyclone that made landfall in a sparsely–populated region of Texas, resulting in relatively little damage. Heavy rainfall in the area peaked at 13.18 in (335 mm) in Sarita. At least 200 homes and large agricultural fields were flooded in Duval County. Strong winds left approximately 64,000 people without electricity in South Texas. Four people died after a truck and a tractor collided near Laredo due to slick roads. In Mexico, the storm brought flooding to Coahuila, Nuevo Leon, and Tamaulipas, with an estimated 14 in (360 mm) of rain falling in Nuevo Leon. Numerous homes in the affected regions were damaged or destroyed, leaving roughly 150 people homeless. Three people died in Mexico – one was trampled to death during evacuation, another was electrocuted, and the third drowned. Overall, the storm caused $15 million in damage.

=== Hurricane Cindy ===
- Category 4 hurricane (SSHWS)
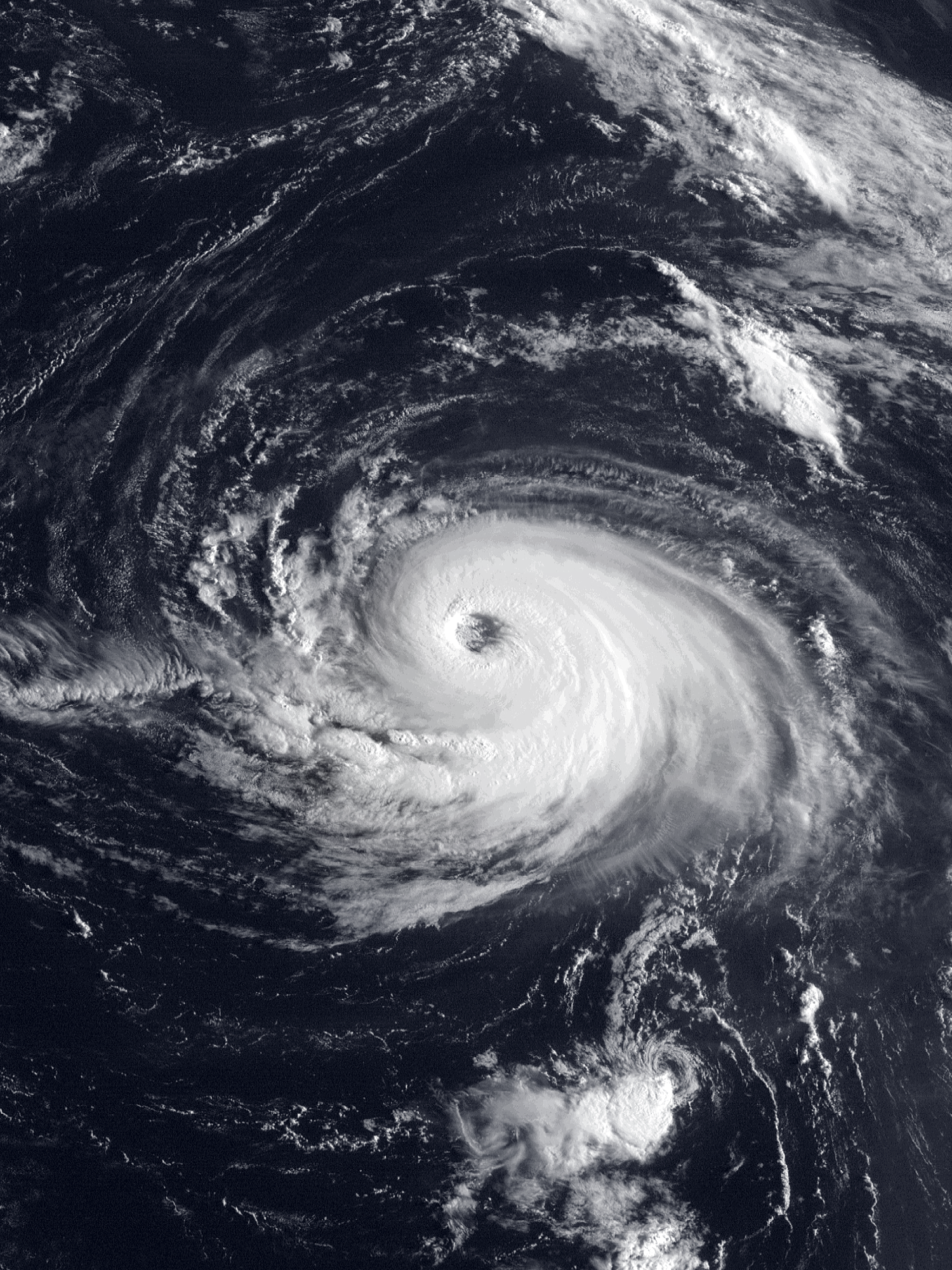
- Duration: August 19 – August 31
- Peak intensity: 140 mph (220 km/h) (1-min); 942 mbar (hPa)

On August 18, a tropical wave moved westward off the coast of Africa. With low pressures and gradually organizing convection, Tropical Depression Four developed west of Senegal early on August 19. Initially it failed to intensify due to wind shear, and the center became ill-defined on August 20. After passing south of Cape Verde, the depression intensified into Tropical Storm Cindy as the convection became concentrated around the center. Due to a strong ridge, Cindy moved westward, before turning northwestward by August 21. Banding features gradually increased as outflow improved, and late on August 21, Cindy became a hurricane. Afterward, increased wind shear dislocated the convection from the center, which weakened Cindy to a tropical storm.

By August 23, high wind shear remained, and the storm's winds decreased to 60 mph (97 km/h). The shear decreased on August 24, and the convection increased over the center. By late on August 25, Cindy regained hurricane status. A ragged eye appeared on satellite imagery on August 27, and early the next day it attained major hurricane status. Cindy turned north-northwestward, now showing a well-defined eye, and reached Category 4 intensity with winds of 140 mph (230 km/h) on August 28. Turning northward, the storm remained at peak intensity until August 30, when prominent wind shear weakened Cindy again. On August 31, Cindy was downgraded to a tropical storm, and later that day it merged with a large extratropical storm northwest of the Azores.

=== Hurricane Dennis ===
- Category 2 hurricane (SSHWS)
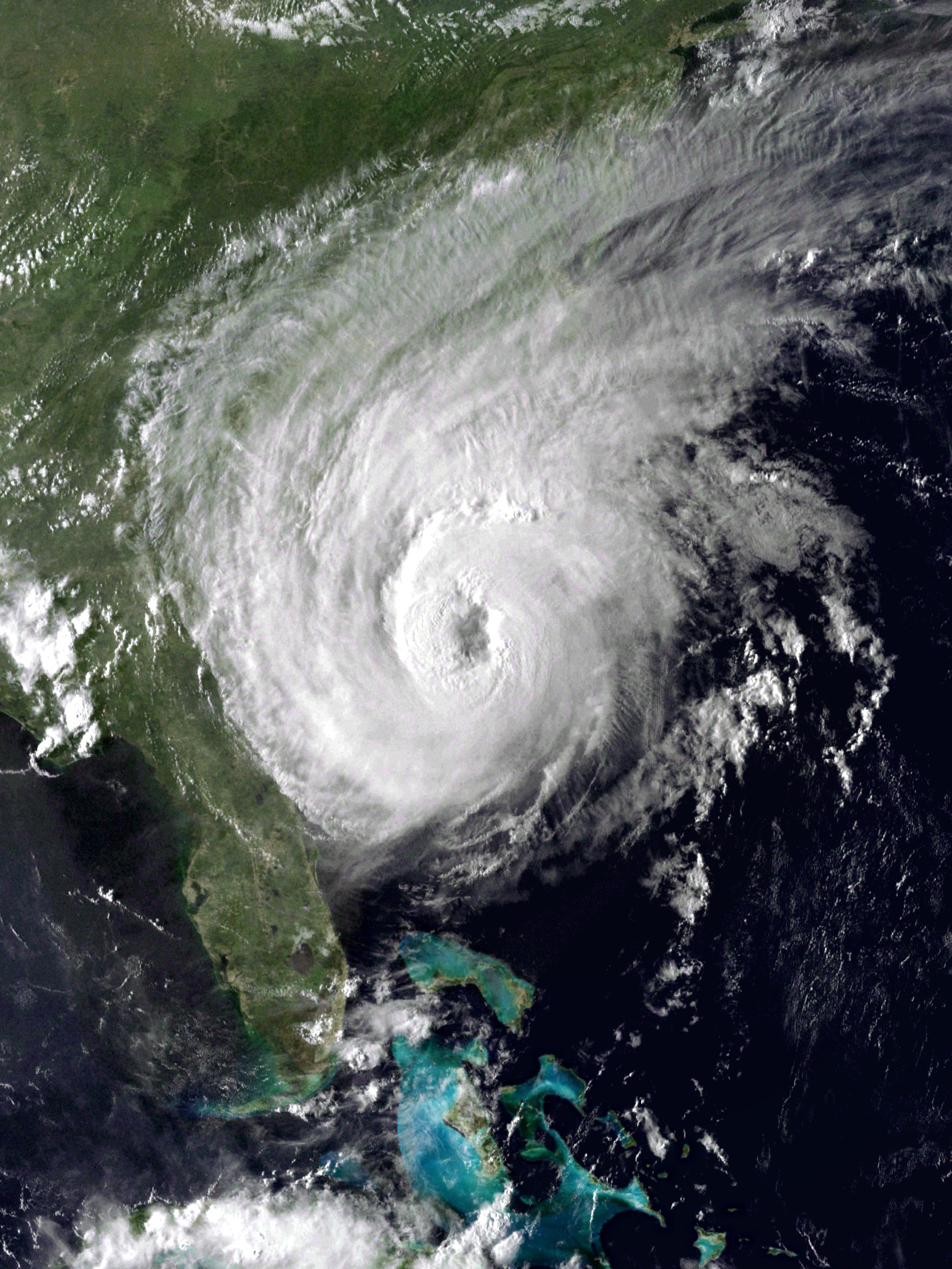
- Duration: August 24 – September 7
- Peak intensity: 105 mph (165 km/h) (1-min); 962 mbar (hPa)

Tropical Depression Five developed from a tropical wave about 220 mi (350 km) east of the Turks Islands on August 23. On the following day, the depression strengthened into Tropical Storm Dennis despite unfavorable westerly shear, which became a hurricane by August 26. After striking the Abaco Islands in the Bahama, conditions improved, allowing for Dennis to strengthen into a Category 2 by August 28. Around this time, Dennis began to move parallel to the Southeastern United States. Early on August 30, the storm peaked with maximum sustained winds of 105 mph (169 km/h) and a minimum barometric pressure of 962 mbar (28.4 inHg). By the following day, steering currents collapsed and the storm interacted with a cold front, causing Dennis to move erratically offshore North Carolina. Wind shear and cold air associated with the front weakened Dennis to a tropical storm on September 1 and removed some of its tropical characteristics. Eventually, warmer ocean temperatures caused some re-strengthening. By September 4, Dennis turned northwestward and made landfall in Cape Lookout, North Carolina, as a strong tropical storm. The storm slowly weakened inland, before transitioning into an extratropical cyclone over western New York on September 7.

In the Bahamas, Dennis produced moderate winds, rain, and storm surge on San Salvador, Crooked Island, Eleuthera, and Abaco Islands, resulting in damage to roofs and coastal properties. Dennis brought 6–8 ft (1.8–2.4 m) waves to the east coast of Florida, causing minor erosion and four drowning deaths. The waves left severe erosion and coastal flooding along the Outer Banks of North Carolina. An 8 ft (2.4 m) deep channel created along Highway 12 isolated three towns on Hatteras Island. In Carteret, Craven, and Dare counties, the storm damaged at least 2,025 homes and businesses to some degree. Heavy rainfall, peaking at 19.91 in (506 mm) at Ocracoke, fell in eastern North Carolina. Although the precipitation was generally beneficial due to drought conditions, it also damaged crops. Two indirect deaths occurred in Richlands during a weather-related car accident. Similar inland flooding occurred in northern and eastern Virginia, with precipitation reaching 10.21 in (259 mm) near Lawrenceville. A tornado in Hampton severely damaged five apartment complexes, three of which were condemned completely, as well an assisted living facility; about 460 people were forced to evacuate from the buildings, and as many as 800 vehicles may have been damaged. Overall damage in North Carolina and Virginia totaled about $157 million. Generally minor flooding occurred in the Mid-Atlantic and New England.

=== Tropical Storm Emily ===
- Tropical storm (SSHWS)
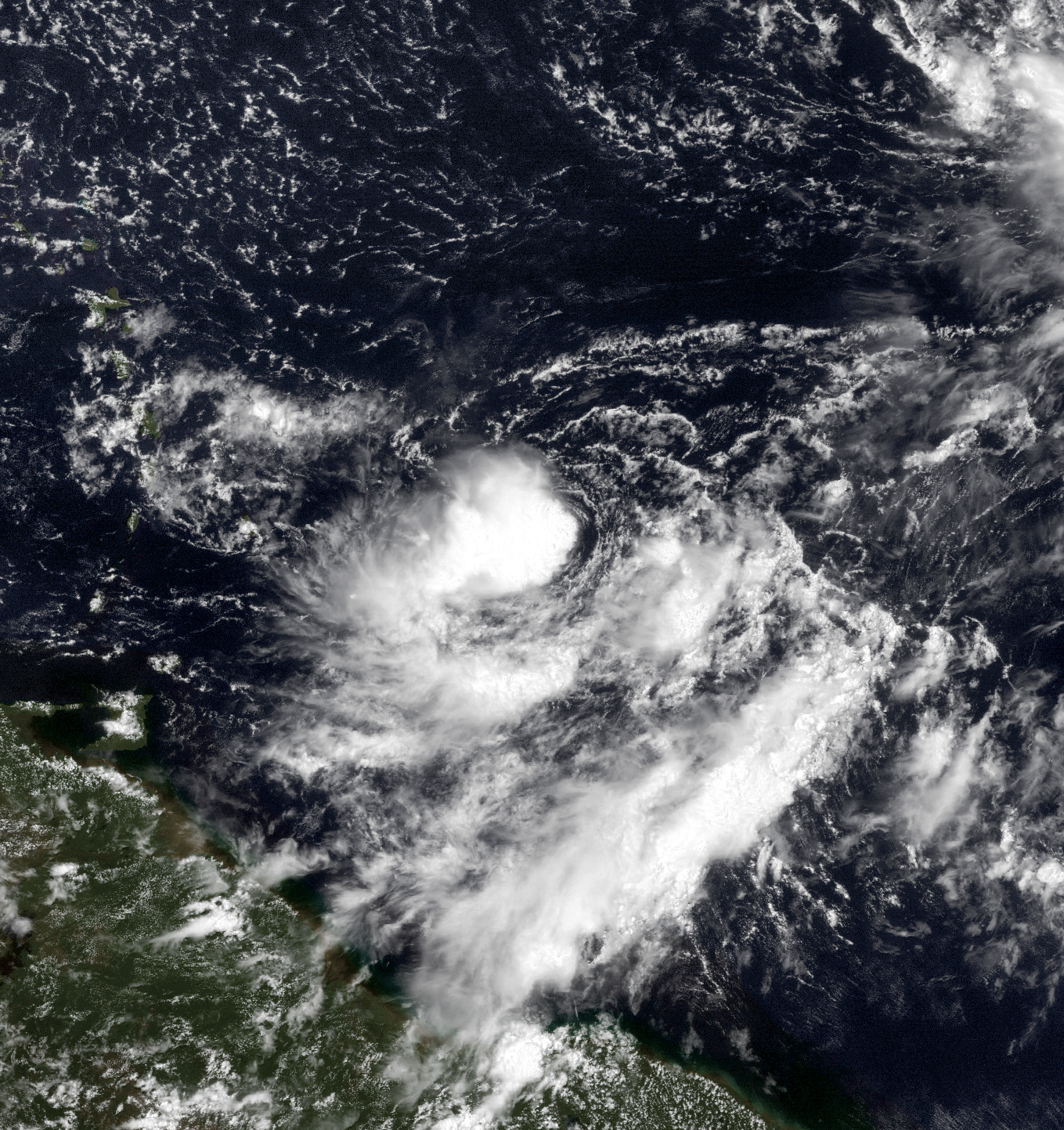
- Duration: August 24 – August 28
- Peak intensity: 50 mph (85 km/h) (1-min); 1004 mbar (hPa)

A tropical wave ahead of Hurricane Cindy exited the west coast of Africa on August 15. Minimal development occurred initially, although the structure gradually organized as it approached the Windward Islands. By 06:00 UTC on August 24, the NHC estimated that a tropical depression developed about 470 mi (760 km) east-northeast of Tobago. The depression strengthened into Tropical Storm Emily six hours later. At 1800 UTC on August 24, Emily attained its peak intensity with maximum sustained winds of 50 mph (80 km/h) and a minimum barometric pressure of 1,004 mbar (29.6 inHg). The NHC did not initiate advisories until 2100 UTC, when a reconnaissance aircraft observed winds of 63 mph (101 km/h) in association with the small circulation of Emily. The agency initially predicted that the storm would intensify into a hurricane near the Windward Islands. Increased wind shear generated by Hurricane Cindy caused Emily to weaken slightly on August 25. Emily began moving slowly northwestward and progressively became more influenced by Cindy, developing occasional convective bursts. Later on August 26, the movement turned northward, well offshore the Lesser Antilles. Eventually, the storm no longer produced convective bursts, and by 12:00 UTC on August 28, Emily weakened to a tropical depression. Six hours later, the storm was absorbed into Cindy northeast of the Leeward Islands.

=== Tropical Depression Seven ===
- Tropical depression (SSHWS)
- Duration: September 5 – September 7
- Peak intensity: 35 mph (55 km/h) (1-min); 1006 mbar (hPa)

Interaction between a strong monsoon-type flow and a tropical wave in the Bay of Campeche resulted in the development of Tropical Depression Seven on September 5. By 00:00 UTC on September 6, the depression attained maximum sustained winds of 35 mph (56 km/h) and a minimum barometric pressure of 1,006 mbar (29.7 inHg). Shortly thereafter, the center of circulation of the depression became difficult to locate, but was likely heading north-northwestward. Due to warm ocean temperatures, the SHIPS model predicted further intensification, despite the storm having almost no deep convection and being close to land.

At 12:00 UTC on September 6, the depression made landfall near La Pesca, Tamaulipas, with winds of 35 mph (56 km/h). The depression quickly weakened inland, and dissipated about twenty-four hours after landfall. Due to forecasts that the depression would strengthen to a tropical storm, the government of Mexico issued a tropical storm warning for Tampico to Matamoros, Tamaulipas. The storm caused heavy rainfall in Mexico, with as much as 17.43 in (443 mm) falling in Ciudad Mante in the state of Tamaulipas. In Texas, the depression produced light rainfall, peaking at 3.35 in (85 mm) in Harlingen.

=== Hurricane Floyd ===
- Category 4 hurricane (SSHWS)
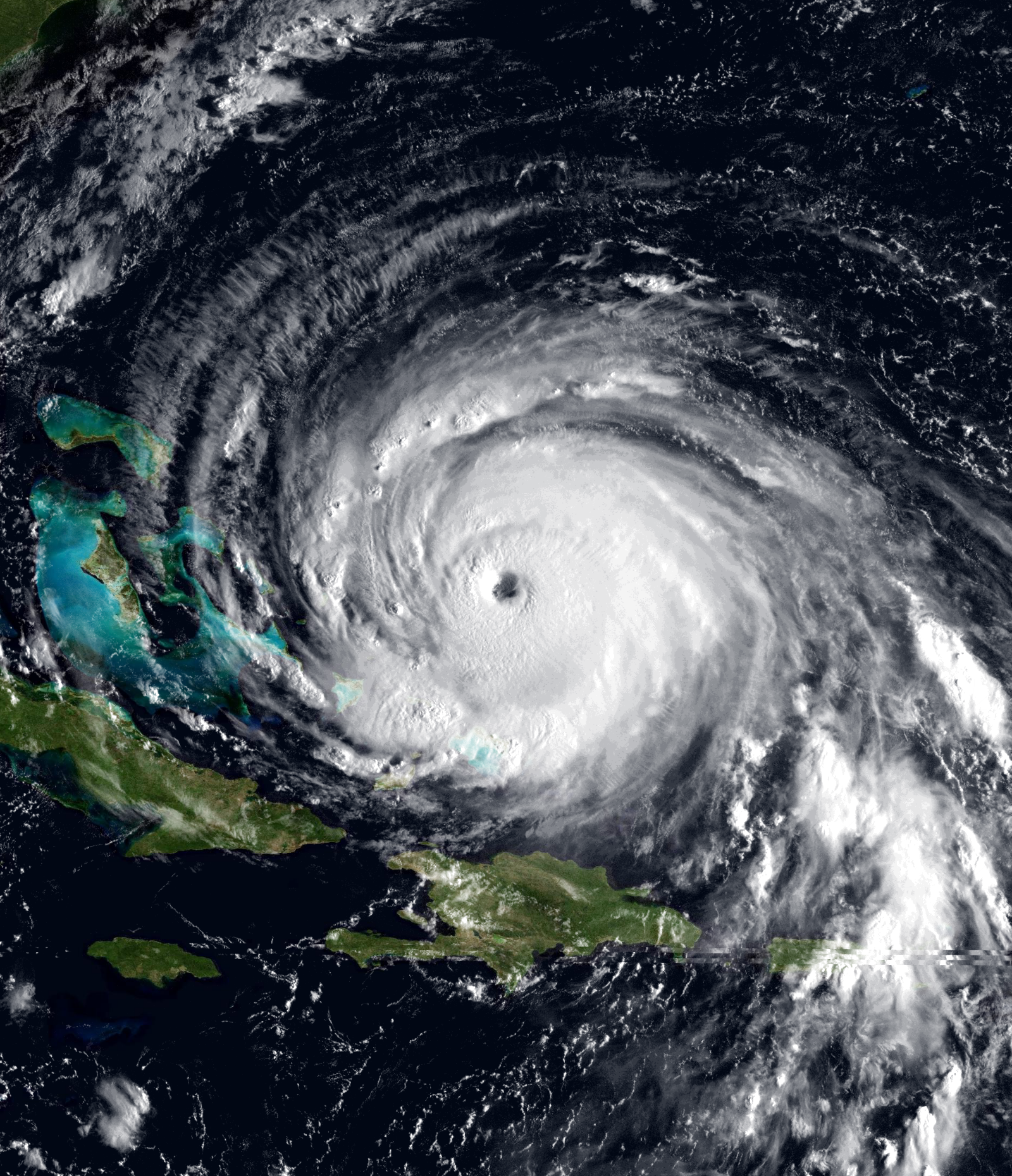
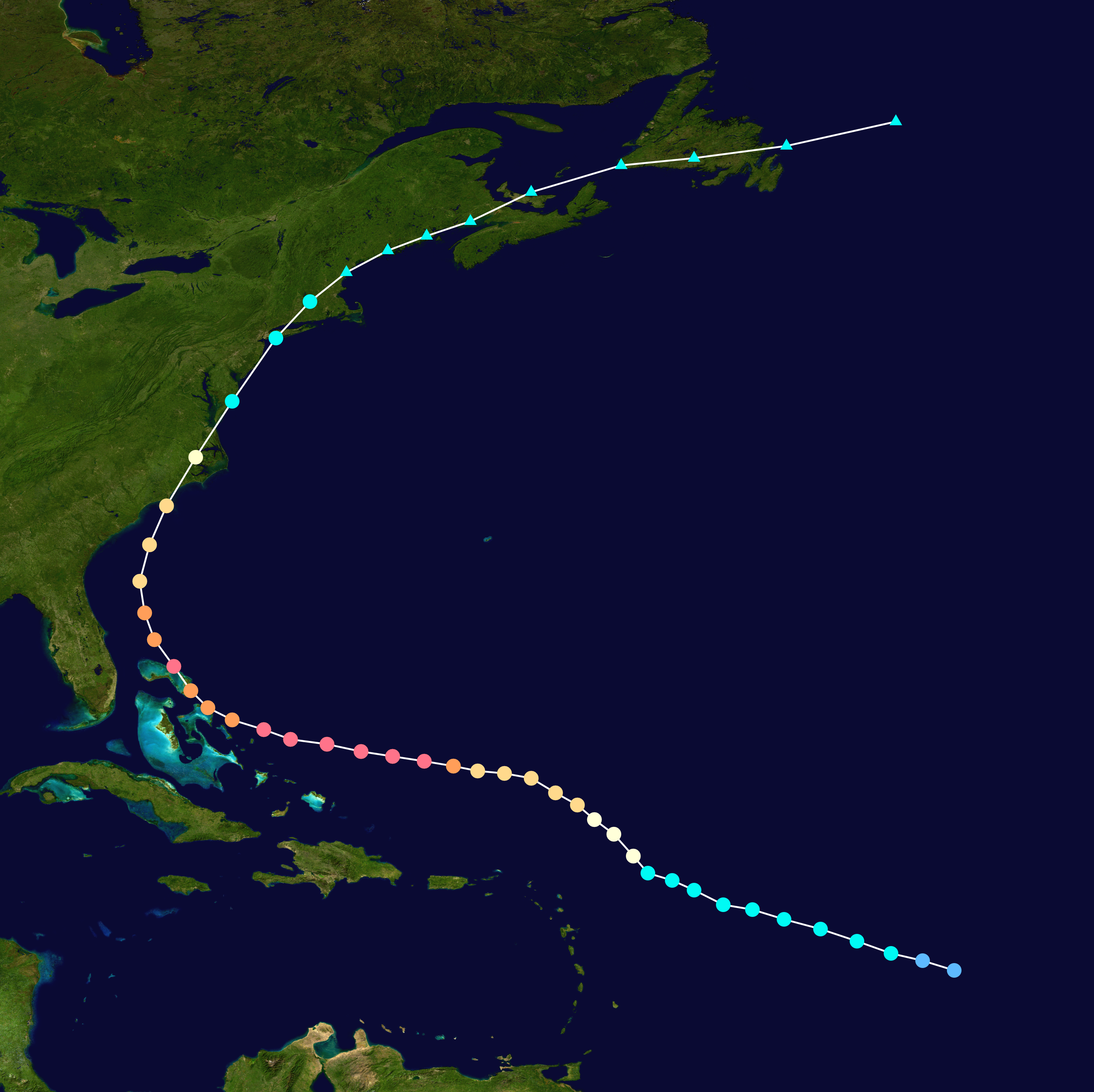
- Duration: September 7 – September 17
- Peak intensity: 155 mph (250 km/h) (1-min); 921 mbar (hPa)

A westward moving tropical wave developed into a tropical depression while located about 1,000 mi (1,600 km) east of the Lesser Antilles on September 7. The depression strengthened and was upgraded to Tropical Storm Floyd on the following day. Floyd became a hurricane on September 10, while curving northwestward, before the storm resumed its initial west-northwestward course late on the following day. Significant intensification occurred on September 12 and September 13. At 12:00 UTC on the latter date, Floyd peaked with maximum sustained winds of 155 mph (249 km/h) and a minimum barometric pressure of 921 mbar (27.2 inHg). Thereafter, the storm began weakening while approaching the Bahamas, decreasing to Category 3 intensity at 06:00 UTC on September 14. Six hours later, Floyd made landfall near Alice Town on Eleuthera with winds of 120 mph (190 km/h), around the time that the cyclone began moving north-northwestward. Shortly before striking the Abaco Islands at 19:00 UTC, the hurricane re-intensified into a Category 4 hurricane. Early on September 15, Floyd weakened to a Category 3 hurricane and passed 110 mi (180 km) offshore Florida. Floyd weakened to a Category 2 hurricane late on September 15, while re-curving to the north-northeast. At 16:30 UTC on September 16, Floyd made landfall near Cape Fear, North Carolina, with winds of 105 mph (169 km/h). Thereafter, the storm rapidly weakened and was a tropical storm by early on the following day. Floyd moved along the coasts of the Delmarva Peninsula and New Jersey, before striking Long Island in New York early on September 17. Shortly thereafter, Floyd transitioned into an extratropical cyclone while interacting with a frontal zone over Maine.

In the Bahamas, a combination of strong winds and storm surge destroyed numerous restaurants, hotels, shops, and homes, and left tens of thousands without water, electricity, and food. One death was reported. Although millions of people in Florida evacuated, damage was relatively minor. The outer bands of Floyd produced up to 3.2 in (81 mm) of rain and tropical storm force winds. As a result, hundreds of trees were downed, which damaged at 467 houses, and several hotels and businesses. Impact in Georgia and South Carolina was minor. North Carolina bore the brunt of the storm. Heavy precipitation fell in the eastern portion of the state, peaking at 24.06 in (611 mm) near Southport. Numerous rivers experienced at least 500-year floods, causing extensive flooding. About 7,000 homes were destroyed and an additional 56,000 suffered damage, of which 17,000 houses were left uninhabitable. At the height of the storm, more than 500,000 people lacked electricity. Thirty-five fatalities and about $4 billion in damage occurred in North Carolina.

Flooding in Virginia damaged about 182 businesses and 9,250 houses, and left about 12 ft (3.7 m) of standing water in Franklin. There were three deaths and $101 million in losses. In Maryland, flooding damaged at least 694 homes, impacted numerous bridges and roads, and left over 250,000 residents without power. Similar effects occurred in Delaware, with at least 171 houses damaged and numerous roads being inundated or washed out. In Pennsylvania, flash flooding affected over 10,000 homes and left more than 500,000 people without electricity. Losses reached $60 million and there were 13 deaths in the state. The storm also caused significant impact in New Jersey, where 3,978 homes, 1,358 apartments, and 1,758 businesses were destroyed or suffered major damage. Six deaths occurred in the state. New York, New England, and Atlantic Canada also experienced flooding, but to a much lesser degree. In New York City, Floyd dropped 5.02 in (128 mm) of rainfall at the Central Park observatory, setting a daily record for precipitation on September 16. Overall, Floyd caused about $6.5 billion in damage and 73 fatalities.

=== Hurricane Gert ===
- Category 4 hurricane (SSHWS)
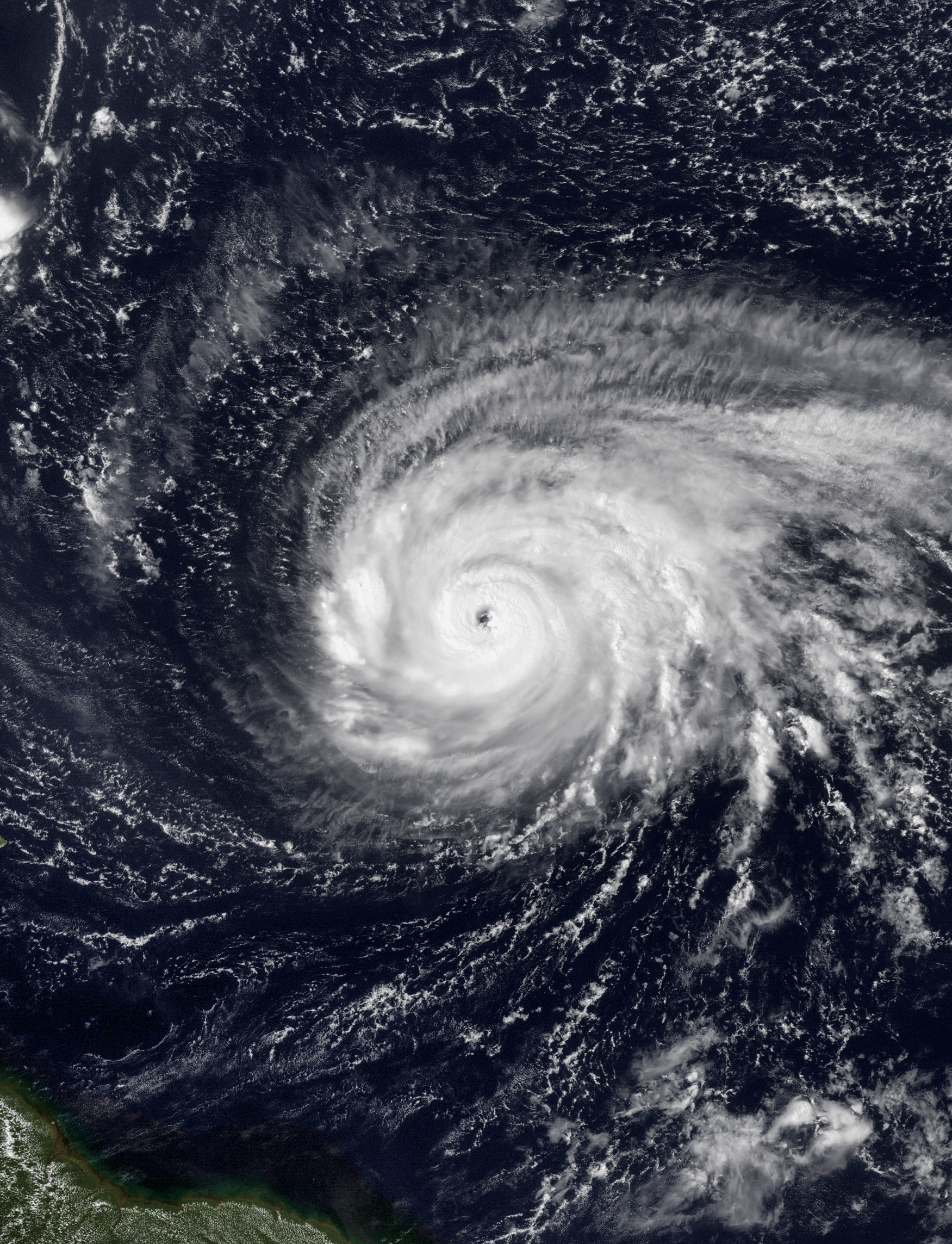
- Duration: September 11 – September 23
- Peak intensity: 150 mph (240 km/h) (1-min); 930 mbar (hPa)

On September 10, a tropical wave moved off the coast of Africa and continued west-northwestward due to a subtropical ridge to its north. Due to the development of a low-level circulation and convective banding, the wave became a tropical depression at 12:00 UTC on September 11 to the south of the Cape Verde islands. After increases in intensity, banding features, and outflow improvement, the depression was upgraded to Tropical Storm Gert on September 12. Warm ocean temperatures and an anticyclone aloft allowed Gert to reach hurricane intensity by the following day. Early on September 15, Gert attained major hurricane strength, as it developed well-defined outflow around a central dense overcast. Early on September 16, Gert reached peak winds of 150 mph (240 km/h) and a minimum barometric pressure of 930 mbar (27 inHg), based on satellite-estimates. This made Gert a Category 4 hurricane. At the time, it was located about 720 mi (1160 km) east-northeast of Guadeloupe in the Lesser Antilles. An eyewall replacement cyclone and increasing wind shear caused it to weaken on September 18, but Gert re-strengthened to a Category 4 hurricane on September 19. Dry air and colder sea surface temperatures caused the hurricane to weaken again, and by September 21, Gert fell to Category 2 status. That day, the hurricane passed about 135 mi (217 km) east of Bermuda. Accelerating northeastward under the influence of an approaching trough, Gert weakened to a tropical storm on September 23 after convection decreased around the center. By 12:00 UTC on September 23, convection diminished enough that the storm transitioned into an extratropical cyclone while situated about 55 mi (89 km) southeast of Cape Race, Newfoundland. About six hours later, the remnants of Gert were absorbed by a larger extratropical storm.

For several days, Gert threatened to strike Bermuda, prompting the evacuation of tourists. Before Gert passed by the island, officials closed two schools and converted them to emergency shelters. Police workers advised 700 families to leave their houses. Cruise lines diverted ships away, while hundreds of tourists took flights to leave the island. Wind gusts on Bermuda reached 87 mph (140 km/h), while sustained winds peaked at 80 mph (130 km/h). Gert also dropped light rainfall of around 0.53 in (13 mm). Rough surf battered the island, resulting in extensive beach erosion. Natural Arches were damaged, and part of a house collapsed into the sea. Approximately 12,000 residents temporarily lost power. Several roads were flooded, and the intense winds downed trees. In Maine, a rogue wave generated by Gert killed two people at Acadia National Park after sweeping them out to sea. Seas in the area generally ran 3 to 5 ft (0.91 to 1.52 m) above normal. Along the coast of Newfoundland, Gert produced wave heights of 30 ft (9 m). In St. Bride's along the Avalon Peninsula, a large wave severely damaged a wharf, destroying five boats and damaging 45 others. The wave swept three people into the ocean, hospitalizing one of them. The wharf required $2 million (1999 CAD, $1.9 million 1999 USD) in repairs, forcing its closure. Further west, high waves damaged a fish plant in Lord's Cove. Gale-force winds extended across southeastern Newfoundland. The winds downed trees and caused power outages, primarily in the St. John's area. St. John's International Airport canceled several flights.

=== Tropical Storm Harvey ===
- Tropical storm (SSHWS)
- Duration: September 19 – September 22
- Peak intensity: 60 mph (95 km/h) (1-min); 994 mbar (hPa)

A tropical wave that emerged into the Atlantic from the west coast of Africa on September 4 reached the Gulf of Mexico by September 18. Following an increase in convection, the system became a tropical depression at 06:00 UTC on September 19. The depression initially tracked due northward and strengthened into Tropical Storm Harvey by early on September 20. Harvey gradually intensified further and 24 hours after the upgrade, the storm peaked with winds of 60 mph (97 km/h) and a minimum barometric pressure of 994 mbar (29.4 inHg). Thereafter, no significant change in intensity occurred before the storm made landfall in Everglades City, Florida, late on September 21. Harvey then accelerated across Florida and by early on September 22, merged with a developing extratropical low while located near Grand Bahama. The remnants reached Atlantic Canada before dissipating on September 24.

In Florida, precipitation peaked at 10.24 in (260 mm) in Naples. As a result, at least 34 houses and businesses were flooded. There were sporadic reports of tropical storm-force winds throughout the state, as well as two tornadoes, neither of which caused left severe impact. Damage estimates in Florida reached about $15 million. Throughout the rest of the United States, impact was limited, confined to light rainfall in Georgia, North Carolina, and South Carolina. Heavy precipitation was reported in Atlantic Canada, with 11.89 in (302 mm) of rain falling in Oxford, Nova Scotia, making Harvey the wettest tropical cyclone or remnants on record in that country. Significant flooding, especially to roads and houses, was reported throughout Atlantic Canada, with damage totaling at least $7.6 million.

=== Tropical Depression Eleven ===
- Tropical depression (SSHWS)
- Duration: October 4 – October 6
- Peak intensity: 35 mph (55 km/h) (1-min); 1002 mbar (hPa)

Until a westward moving tropical wave reached the western Caribbean Sea on September 30, minimal organization occurred. The system eventually emerged into the Gulf of Mexico and developed into Tropical Depression Eleven on October 4. Weak steering current caused the depression to drift slowly and erratically, with the depression initially heading southward, before curving northwest. A surface trough over the central and eastern Gulf of Mexico prevented significant strengthening. The depression remained below tropical storm intensity, attaining its peak intensity on October 5, with maximum sustained winds of 35 mph (56 km/h) and a minimum barometric pressure of 1,002 mbar (29.6 inHg). While approaching the Gulf Coast of Mexico, the depression was absorbed by the surface trough at 18:00 UTC on October 6.

The depression and its remnants contributed significantly to the October 1999 Mexico floods, bring up to 43.23 in (1,098 mm) of rain to Jalacingo, Veracruz. Throughout Mexico, 90,000 houses were damaged or destroyed, leaving about 500,000 people homeless. and more than 400 people dead. Flooding caused thousands of landslides and 39 rivers to overflow, leading to the destruction of bridges, houses, widespread crop fields, schools, and electrical networks. Flooding also extended into Central America in late September through early October, causing $40 million (385 million pesos) in crop damage and 70 deaths. However, impact by the depression itself cannot be distinguished.

=== Tropical Depression Twelve ===
- Tropical depression (SSHWS)
- Duration: October 6 – October 8
- Peak intensity: 35 mph (55 km/h) (1-min); 1007 mbar (hPa)

On September 30, a tropical wave emerged into the Atlantic Ocean from the west coast of Africa. It slowly began to organize during the next several days and by early on October 6, developed into Tropical Depression Twelve while located about 1,075 mi (1,730 km) east of Martinique. Due to an anticyclone, conditions appeared favorable for significant strengthening, with the National Hurricane Center predicting the depression to be at least a strong tropical storm by October 9. However, wind shear began undercutting the anticyclone, which prevented any significant intensification. Later on October 6, the low-level circulation became exposed to the west of the deep convection. The depression never re-organized and instead deteriorated in structure due to shearing. Despite a burst in convection on October 8, the depression dissipated at 18:00 UTC while located about 875 mi (1,408 km) east-northeast of Barbuda.

=== Hurricane Irene ===
- Category 2 hurricane (SSHWS)
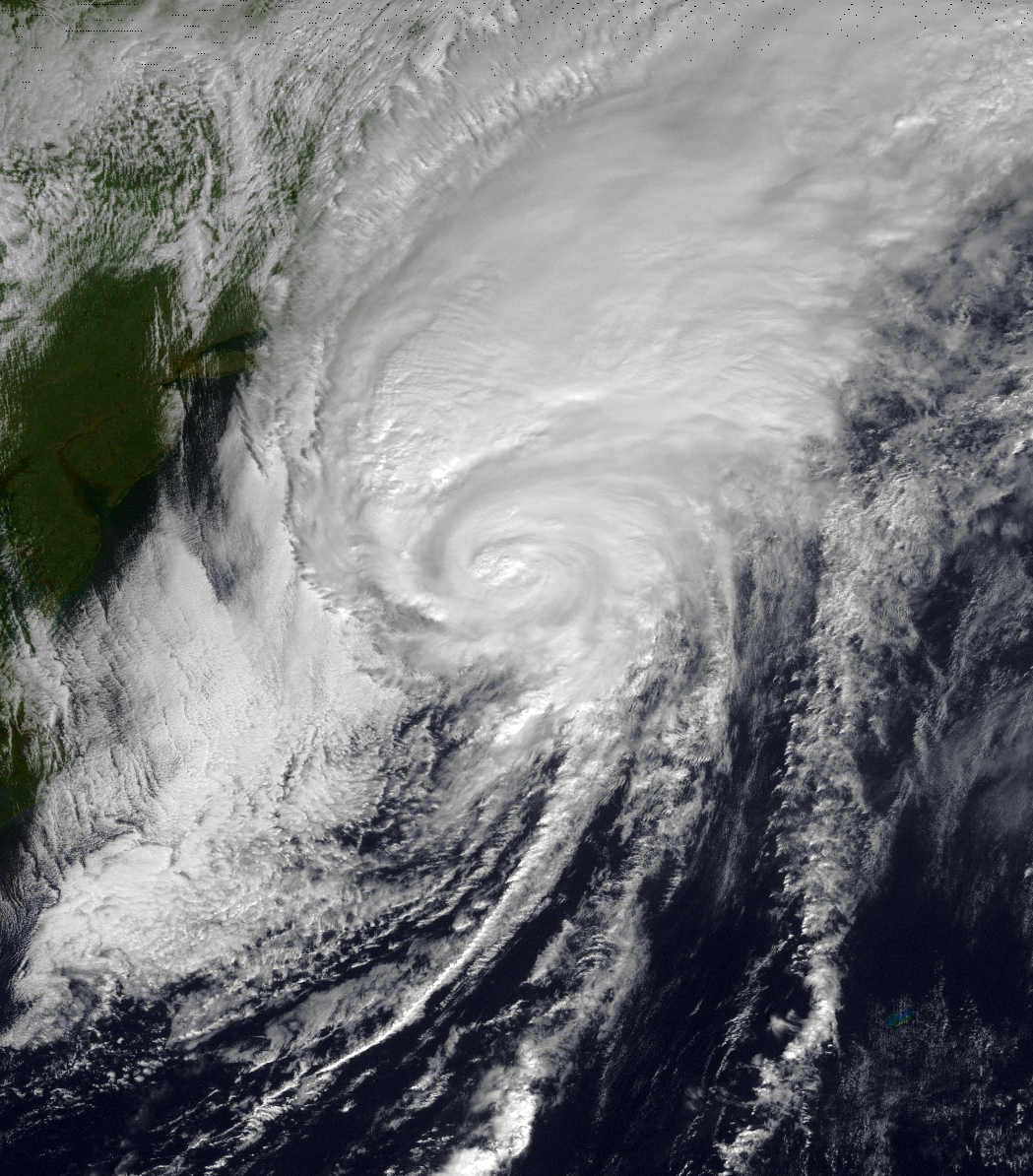
- Duration: October 12 – October 19
- Peak intensity: 110 mph (175 km/h) (1-min); 958 mbar (hPa)

A broad trough of low pressure developed into a tropical depression while south of the Isle of Youth on October 12. It headed north and soon intensified into Tropical Storm Irene. On October 14, the storm passed over the Isle of Youth and western Cuba. While over the Straits of Florida, Irene reached hurricane strength. The next day, it made landfall in Key West, Florida, and again near Cape Sable. Later on October 15, Irene moved back over water near Jupiter as a minimal hurricane. It slowly strengthened as it paralleled the East Coast of the United States. When Irene interacted with a trough from the west, while over the warm Gulf Stream waters, the hurricane rapidly intensified and attained its peak intensity with maximum sustained winds 110 mph (180 km/h) and a minimum barometric pressure of 958 mbar (28.3 inHg) on October 18. However, after accelerating northeast, Irene weakened over the cooler waters of the North Atlantic. On October 19, the hurricane transitioned into an extratropical cyclone near Newfoundland and was absorbed by an extratropical low shortly thereafter.

Irene dropped heavy rainfall throughout its path, especially in Cuba and Florida. Rainfall on Cuba peaked at 35.6 in (900 mm) in Manaca-Iznaga, while the rest of the island reported more than 7 in (180 mm). Flooding resulted from the heavy rains, damaging more than 27,000 homes and causing significant effects to banana plantations and sugar cane fields. Hurricane forces winds were also reported in Havana. Four fatalities were reported. The storm brought flooding to Florida, particularly the southern portion of the state, where 17.45 in (443 mm) of rain fell in Boynton Beach. Hundreds were displaced from their homes and thousands were isolated. Five people died from walking through electrified water after a power line fell, while three others drowned after unintentionally driving their vehicle into a canal. Total damage in Florida was around $800 million. The hurricane left five deaths in the Bahamas, one direct and four indirect. Irene also contributed slightly to ongoing flood problems in North Carolina in the aftermath of Hurricane Floyd.

=== Hurricane Jose ===
- Category 2 hurricane (SSHWS)
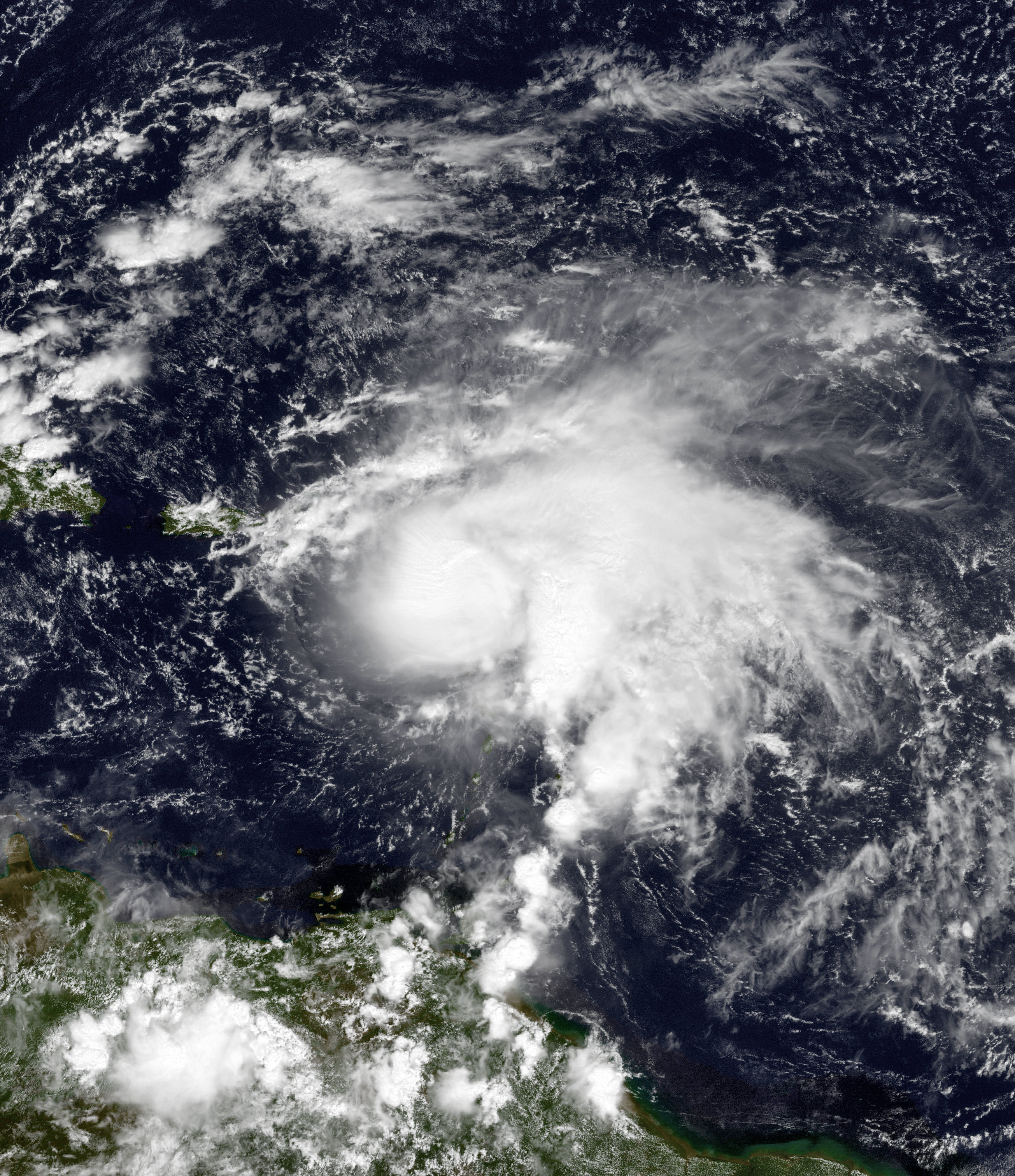
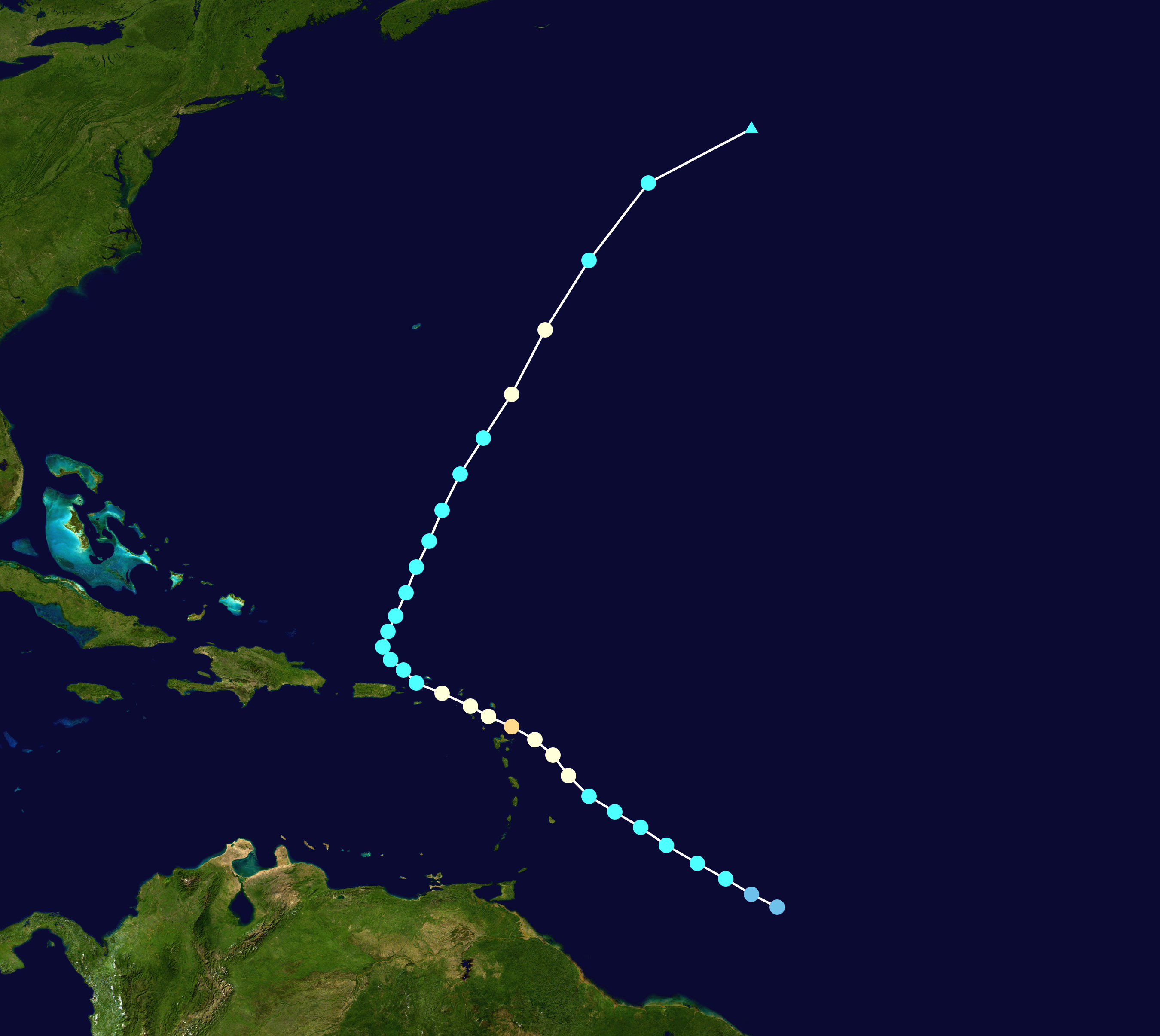
- Duration: October 17 – October 25
- Peak intensity: 100 mph (155 km/h) (1-min); 979 mbar (hPa)

On October 17, a tropical wave entered the Atlantic on October 8 and developed into a tropical depression while located 700 mi (1,100 km) east of the Windward Islands. The depression strengthened and by early on October 18, it was upgraded to Tropical Storm Jose. Intensification continued as Jose tracked west-northwestward and Jose reached hurricane status late on October 19. The storm became a Category 2 hurricane, though unfavorable conditions weakened it back. Later on October 21, Jose began moving through the Lesser Antilles as a Category 1 and fell to tropical storm intensity before reentering the Atlantic later that day. While north of Puerto Rico on October 22, Jose re-curved northeastward. The storm eventually began to accelerate and re-strengthen, reaching hurricane status again on October 24. After twelve hours as a hurricane, colder sea surface temperatures weakened Jose to a tropical storm on October 25, shortly before it became extratropical.

The worst of the effects from Jose occurred in Antigua and Barbuda, as winds up to 102 mph (164 km/h) were reported. About 500 houses and a newly built church were destroyed. About 50% of residents were left without water and 90% of people experienced power outages. Overall, twelve people were injured, one fatality occurred, and an elderly blind man was listed as missing. Flooding in Saint Kitts and Nevis washed out several major roads and caused landslides. Additionally, one person was killed during the storm. In Sint Maarten, mudslides and flooding damaged houses and roads, especially those in low-lying areas. Nearly 15 in (380 mm) of rain and winds up to 100 mph (160 km/h) in Anguilla left roads impassable and power outages, and damaged houses, crops, and shipping facilities. Strong winds and heavy rainfall in Puerto Rico and the United States Virgin Islands caused extensive power outages and minor damage, estimated at $40,000. Overall, losses from the storm was less than $5 million.

=== Tropical Storm Katrina ===
- Tropical storm (SSHWS)
- Duration: October 28 – November 1
- Peak intensity: 40 mph (65 km/h) (1-min); 999 mbar (hPa)

The remnants of a cold front moved southward through the western Caribbean Sea on October 22, leading to a broad low pressure area forming by October 26. The pulsing thunderstorms and circulation organized into Tropical Depression Fifteen on October 28, located about 175 mi (280 km) east of Bluefields, Nicaragua. Although wind shear displaced the circulation from the thunderstorms, the depression also developed rainbands, a sign of intensification. Late on October 29, the NHC upgraded the depression to Tropical Storm Katrina, based on gale-force winds recorded by the Hurricane Hunters. Soon thereafter, Katrina moved ashore eastern Nicaragua near Puerto Cabezas with peak winds of 40 mph (65 km/h) around 00:00 UTC on October 30. It quickly weakened to a depression over land as it moved northwestward. Roughly 24 hours after landfall, Katrina re-emerged over water into the Gulf of Honduras, after its circulation reformed. However, there was little remaining thunderstorms, and Katrina failed to re-intensify before making landfall again near the northern Belize–Mexico border on October 31. Although forecasters noted the potential for re-intensification over the Gulf of Mexico, Katrina dissipated on November 1 off the northern coast of the Yucatán Peninsula, where it was absorbed by another cold front.

Upon the storm's formation, tropical storm warnings were issued for the coast of Nicaragua, as well as the San Andrés islands of Colombia shortly afterward. Roughly 1,200 people were evacuated to emergency shelters in Honduras. The storm dropped torrential rainfall across Central America, estimated between 10 and 15 in (250 and 380 mm), which affected areas devastated by Hurricane Mitch the year prior. However, there was little flooding and only minor landslides. The flooding also damaged five bridges in Honduras, and the cities of Tocoa and Trujillo were isolated as the Aguán and Siline rivers overflowed their banks. Katrina also destroyed water pipes that were replaced after Mitch, worth HNL 170,000 (US$9,000). Between October 30 and November 1, the remnants of Katrina produced widespread moderate rainfall across the Yucatan Peninsula, peaking at 6.32 in (161 mm) in Cunduacán. Moisture from the remnants of the storm enhanced rainfall across southern Florida in association with the cold front that absorbed the system.

=== Hurricane Lenny ===
- Category 4 hurricane (SSHWS)
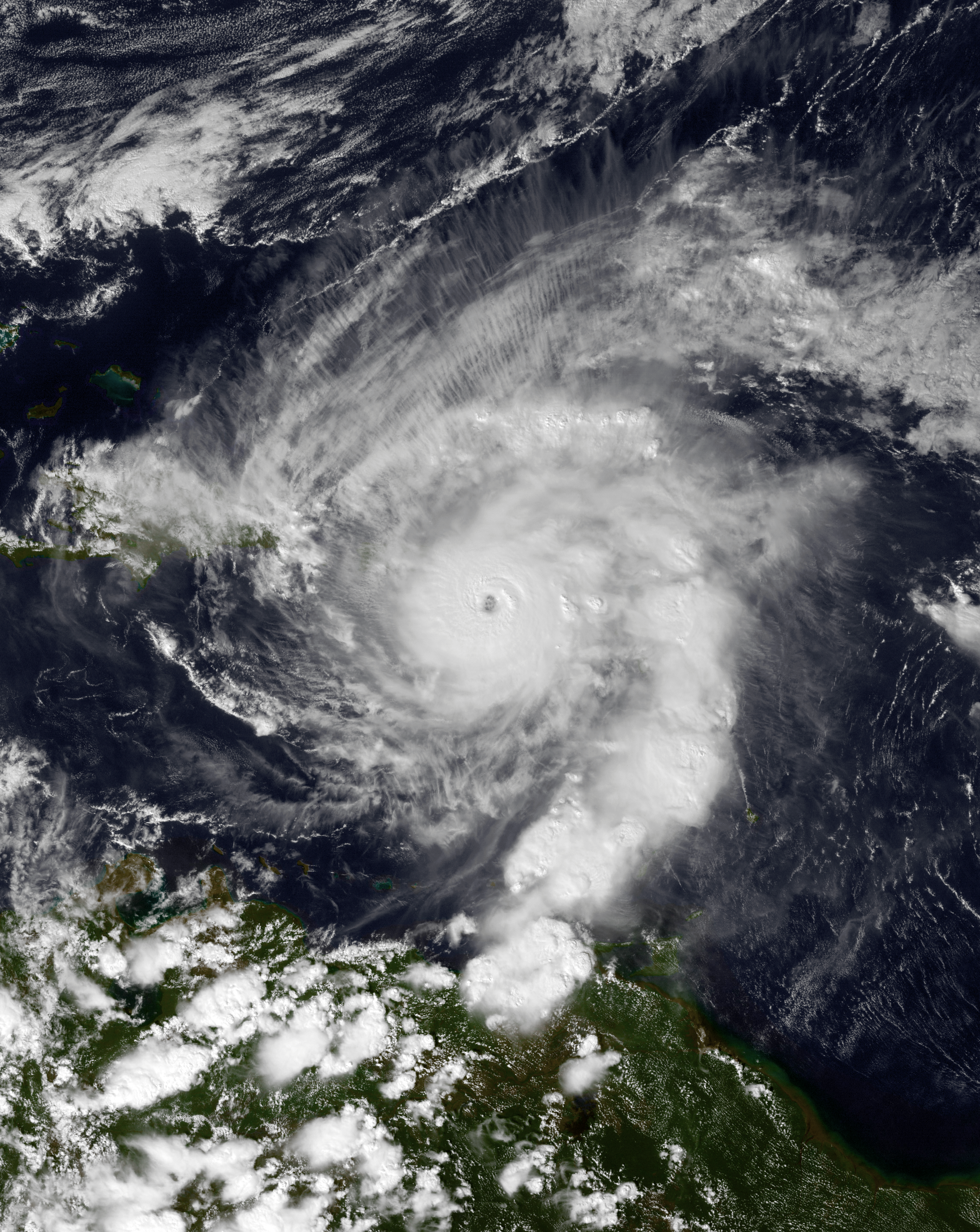
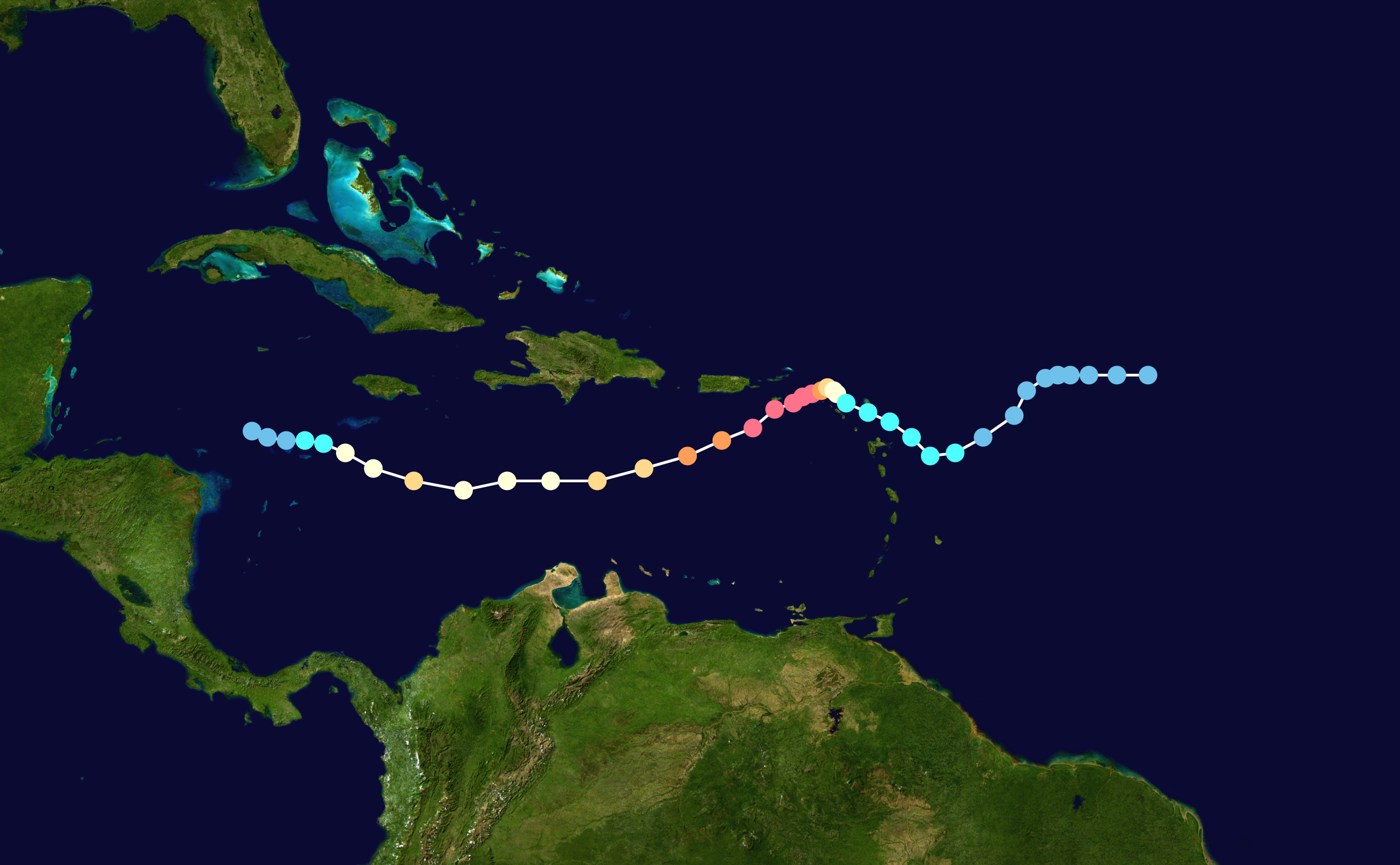
- Duration: November 13 – November 23
- Peak intensity: 155 mph (250 km/h) (1-min); 933 mbar (hPa)

A low pressure area developed into a tropical depression about 175 mi (282 km) south of the Cayman Islands at 18:00 UTC on November 13. The depression began to move in an unusual eastward track across the Caribbean Sea along the southern periphery of a trough and strengthened into Tropical Storm Lenny on the following day. It attained hurricane status south of Jamaica on November 15 and passed south of Hispaniola and Puerto Rico over the next few days. Beginning on November 16, Lenny underwent rapid deepening, becoming a major hurricane early on November 17 while south of the Mona Passage. Later that day, Lenny peaked as a Category 4 hurricane with winds of 155 mph (249 km/h) and a minimum pressure of 933 mbar (27.6 inHg) while near Saint Croix. It gradually weakened due to wind shear while moving through the Leeward Islands, where it struck Saint Martin, Anguilla, and Saint Barthélemy. The system weakened to a tropical storm on November 19. After clearing the islands, Lenny deteriorated to a tropical depression on November 21 and dissipated on November 23, while located about 690 mi (1,110 km) east of the Lesser Antilles.

Before moving through the Lesser Antilles, Lenny produced rough surf that killed two people in northern Colombia. Strong winds and rainfall resulted in heavy crop damage in southeastern Puerto Rico. Lenny brought more heavy rains to areas in the Leeward Islands that had been affected by Hurricane Jose just one month earlier, and brought more damage to areas struck by Hurricane Georges in 1998. Despite the hurricane's passage near Saint Croix at peak intensity, damage on the small island was only described as "moderate", although there was widespread flooding and erosion. Damage in the United States territories totaled about $330 million. The highest precipitation total was 34.12 in (867 mm) at the police station on the French side of Saint Martin. On the island, the hurricane killed three people and destroyed more than 200 properties. In nearby Antigua and Barbuda, the hurricane killed one person; torrential rainfall there contaminated the local water supply. Significant storm damage occurred as far south as Grenada, where high surf isolated towns from the capital city.

== Storm names ==
The following list of names was used for named storms that formed in the north Atlantic in 1999. This was the same list used for the 1993 season as no names were retired from that year. A storm was named Lenny for the first (and only) time in 1999.

- Arlene
- Bret
- Cindy
- Dennis
- Emily
- Floyd
- Gert
- Harvey
- Irene
- Jose
- Katrina
- Lenny
- Maria (unused)
- Nate (unused)
- Ophelia (unused)
- Philippe (unused)
- Rita (unused)
- Stan (unused)
- Tammy (unused)
- Vince (unused)
- Wilma (unused)

=== Retirement ===
The World Meteorological Organization retired the names Floyd and Lenny in the spring of 2000 from the Atlantic hurricane name lists on account of their destructiveness. They were replaced with Franklin and Lee for the 2005 season.

== Season effects ==
This is a table of all of the storms that formed in the 1999 Atlantic hurricane season. It includes their name, duration, peak classification and intensities, areas affected, damage, and death totals. Deaths in parentheses are additional and indirect (an example of an indirect death would be a traffic accident), but were still related to that storm. Damage and deaths include totals while the storm was extratropical, a wave, or a low, and all of the damage figures are in 1999 USD.

Saffir–Simpson scale
TD	TS	C1	C2	C3	C4	C5

1999 North Atlantic tropical cyclone season statistics
Storm name	Dates active	Storm category at peak intensity	Max 1-min wind mph (km/h)	Min. press. (mbar)	Areas affected	Damage (US$)	Deaths	Ref(s).
Arlene	June 11 – 18	Tropical storm	60 (95)	1006	Bermuda	Minimal	None	
Two	July 2 – 3	Tropical depression	35 (55)	1004	Mexico	Unknown	None	
Bret	August 18 – 25	Category 4 hurricane	145 (230)	944	Central Mexico, Southern United States	$15 million	1 (6)	
Cindy	August 19 – 31	Category 4 hurricane	140 (220)	942	Cape Verde, Bermuda	None	1	
Dennis	August 24 – September 7	Category 2 hurricane	105 (165)	962	Lucayan Archipelago, East Coast of the United States, Mid-Atlantic, Atlantic Canada	$157 million	6	
Emily	August 24 – 28	Tropical storm	50 (85)	1004	None	None	None	
Seven	September 5 – 7	Tropical depression	35 (55)	1006	Mexico, Texas	Unknown	None	
Floyd	September 7 – 17	Category 4 hurricane	155 (250)	921	Lesser Antilles, Lucayan Archipelago, Greater Antilles, Bahamas, Southeastern United States, Mid-Atlantic, Atlantic Canada	$6.5 billion	57 (20–30)	
Gert	September 11 – 23	Category 4 hurricane	150 (240)	930	Bermuda, Atlantic Canada	$1.9 million	2	
Harvey	September 19 – 22	Tropical storm	60 (95)	994	Southeastern United States, Atlantic Canada	$22.6 million	None	
Eleven	October 4 – 6	Tropical depression	35 (55)	1002	Eastern Mexico, Central America	$491.3 million	636	
Twelve	October 6 – 8	Tropical depression	35 (55)	1007	None	None	None	
Irene	October 12 – 19	Category 2 hurricane	110 (175)	958	Lucayan Archipelago, Greater Antilles, Southeastern United States	$800 million	3 (15)	
Jose	October 17 – 25	Category 2 hurricane	100 (155)	979	Lesser Antilles, Greater Antilles	$5 million	3	
Katrina	October 28 – November 1	Tropical storm	40 (65)	999	Central America, Mexico	$9,000	None	
Lenny	November 13 – 23	Category 4 hurricane	155 (250)	933	South America, Greater Antilles, Lucayan Archipelago, Lesser Antilles	$785.8 million	17	
Season aggregates
16 systems	June 11 – November 23		155 (250)	921		$8.78 billion	726 (39-49)	

== See also ==
- Tropical cyclones in 1999
- 1999 Pacific hurricane season
- 1999 Pacific typhoon season
- 1999 North Indian Ocean cyclone season
- Australian region cyclone season: 1998–99, 1999–2000
- South Pacific cyclone season: 1998–99, 1999–2000
- South-West Indian Ocean cyclone season: 1998–99, 1999–2000
