= Hurricane Bret =

Category 4 Atlantic hurricane in 1999

- Bret at peak intensity shortly before its landfall in southern Texas on August 22

Meteorological history
- Formed: August 18, 1999
- Dissipated: August 25, 1999

Category 4 major hurricane
- 1-minute sustained (SSHWS/NWS)
- Highest winds: 145 mph (230 km/h)
- Lowest pressure: 944 mbar (hPa); 27.88 inHg

Overall effects
- Fatalities: 7
- Damage: $15 million (1999 USD)
- Areas affected: South Texas and Mexico
- IBTrACS
- Part of the 1999 Atlantic hurricane season

Hurricane Bret was the first of five Category 4 hurricanes that developed during the 1999 Atlantic hurricane season and the first tropical cyclone since Hurricane Jerry in 1989 to make landfall in Texas at hurricane intensity. Forming from a tropical wave on August 18, Bret slowly organized within weak steering currents in the Bay of Campeche. By August 20, the storm began to track northward and underwent rapid intensification on August 21. After this period of strengthening, Bret attained its peak intensity with winds of 145 miles per hour (233 km/h) and a barometric pressure of 944 mbar (hPa; 27.9 inHg). Later that day, the storm weakened to a Category 3 hurricane and made landfall on Padre Island, Texas. Shortly thereafter, the storm weakened further, becoming a tropical depression 24 hours after moving inland. The remnants of the storm eventually dissipated early on August 26 over northern Mexico.

Along the Texas coastline, Bret threatened several cities, prompting 180,000 residents to evacuate. Numerous shelters were opened throughout the region and prisons were evacuated. Several days prior to the storm's arrival, the NHC issued hurricane watches, and later warnings for areas near the Texas–Mexico border. Several major roads leading to barrier island towns were shut down to prevent residents from crossing bridges during the hurricane. In nearby Mexico, roughly 7,000 people left coastal areas in advance of the storm. Officials also set up hundreds of shelters in northern regions of the country in case of major flooding.

Bret made landfall in a sparsely populated region, resulting in relatively little damage in comparison to its intensity. Nevertheless, seven people were killed in relation to the storm, four in Texas and three in Mexico. Most of the deaths were due to car accidents caused by slippery roads. Upon making landfall, the hurricane produced a maximum storm surge of 8.8 ft (2.7 m) at Matagorda Island, Texas. Heavy rains produced by Bret peaked at 13.18 in (335 mm) in Texas and were estimated over 14 in (360 mm) in Mexico. Numerous homes in the affected regions were damaged or destroyed, leaving roughly 150 people homeless. In all, the storm caused $15 million (1999 USD) in damage.

== Meteorological history ==
Map plotting the storm's track and intensity, according to the Saffir–Simpson scale Map key Saffir–Simpson scale Tropical depression (≤38 mph, ≤62 km/h) Tropical storm (39–73 mph, 63–118 km/h) Category 1 (74–95 mph, 119–153 km/h) Category 2 (96–110 mph, 154–177 km/h) Category 3 (111–129 mph, 178–208 km/h) Category 4 (130–156 mph, 209–251 km/h) Category 5 (≥157 mph, ≥252 km/h) Unknown Storm type Tropical cyclone Subtropical cyclone Extratropical cyclone, remnant low, tropical disturbance, or monsoon depression

Bret originated from a tropical wave that moved off the west coast of Africa on August 5. The wave tracked generally westward, interacting with an upper-level low on August 15 in the western Caribbean Sea, and spawned a low-pressure area. Convective activity developed around the low, and by August 18 the system was over the Yucatán Peninsula. Later that day, the disturbance emerged into the Bay of Campeche and a Hurricane Hunter reconnaissance mission into the system revealed that it had matured into a tropical depression around 1:00 pm CDT (18:00 UTC), the third of the 1999 season. Initially, moderate wind shear prevented the depression from strengthening as it moved slowly and erratically in response to weak steering currents over the system. By August 19, the wind shear relented, allowing deep convection to develop over the center; later that day, the National Hurricane Center (NHC) upgraded the system to a tropical storm, assigning it the name Bret. A small tropical cyclone, Bret gradually strengthened for several days as it tracked towards the north. By the morning of August 20, rainbands began to form.

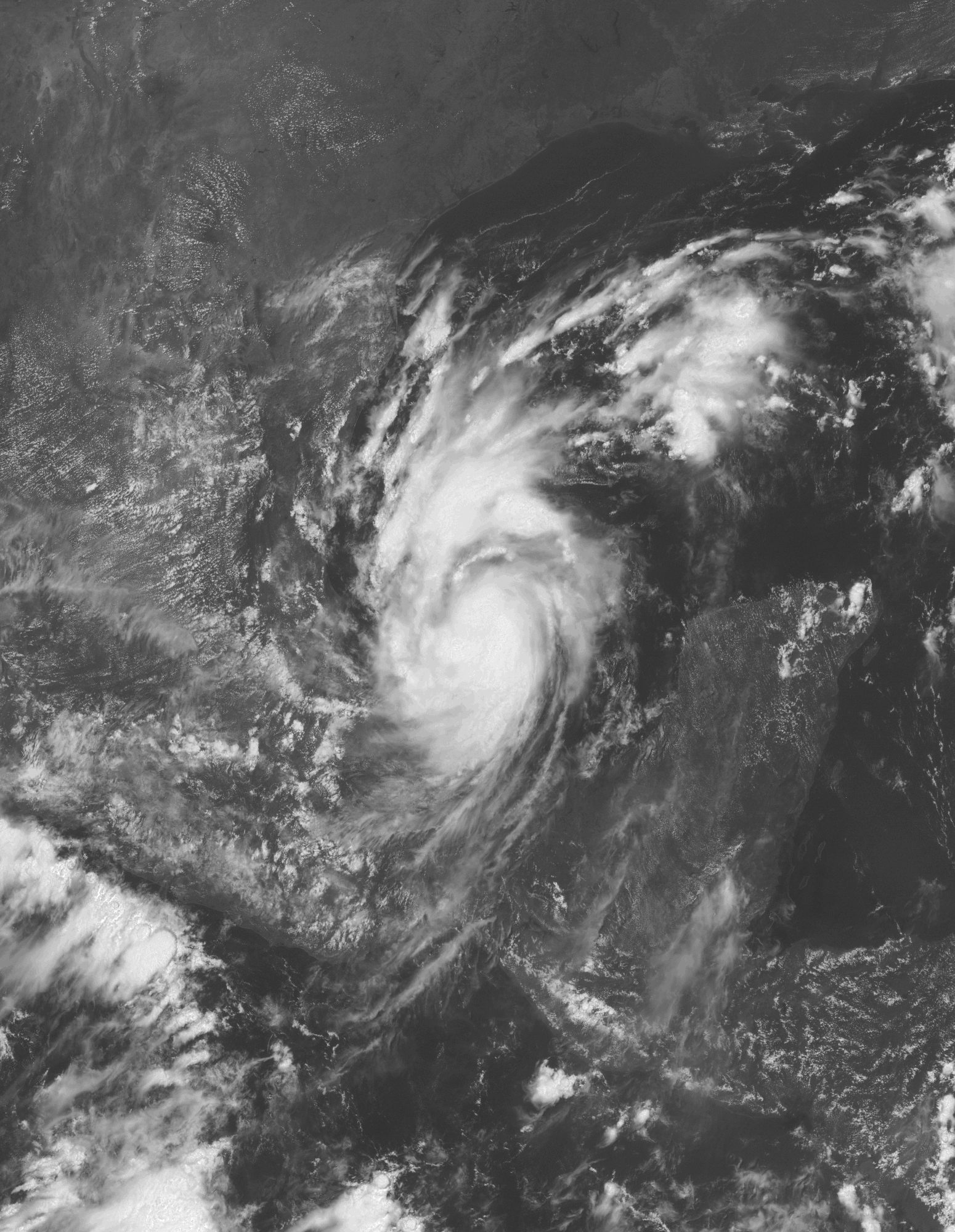
Tropical Storm Bret organizing over the Bay of Campeche

By the evening of August 20, Bret was designated a hurricane following reports of 75 miles per hour (121 km/h) winds during a Hurricane Hunter mission. At around the same time, Bret established a north-northwest track under the influences of a mid-level ridge. The following day, Bret began to undergo rapid intensification, as a well-defined eye developed. On the morning of August 22, the storm attained its peak intensity as a Category 4 hurricane with winds of 145 miles per hour (233 km/h) and a barometric pressure of 944 mbar (hPa; 27.9 inHg). Shortly thereafter, an upper-level trough to the west of the storm began to erode its cloud pattern.

Late on August 22, Bret turned northwestward in response to a mid-tropospheric ridge over the Gulf of Mexico and a mid-tropospheric circulation over the Rio Grande Valley. Several hours before landfall, the hurricane weakened to Category 3 intensity and its forward motion slowed. At around 7:00 pm CDT (00:00 UTC; August 23), Hurricane Bret passed over Padre Island, Texas, with winds of 115 miles per hour (185 km/h) and a barometric pressure of 951 mbar (hPa; 28.1 inHg), which marked its landfall. The hurricane rapidly weakened upon moving inland, and roughly 12 hours after landfall, Bret weakened to a tropical storm. It further degenerated into a tropical depression by the evening of August 23. The remnants of Bret persisted until August 26, at which time they dissipated over the mountains of northern Mexico.

== Preparations ==
=== Texas ===
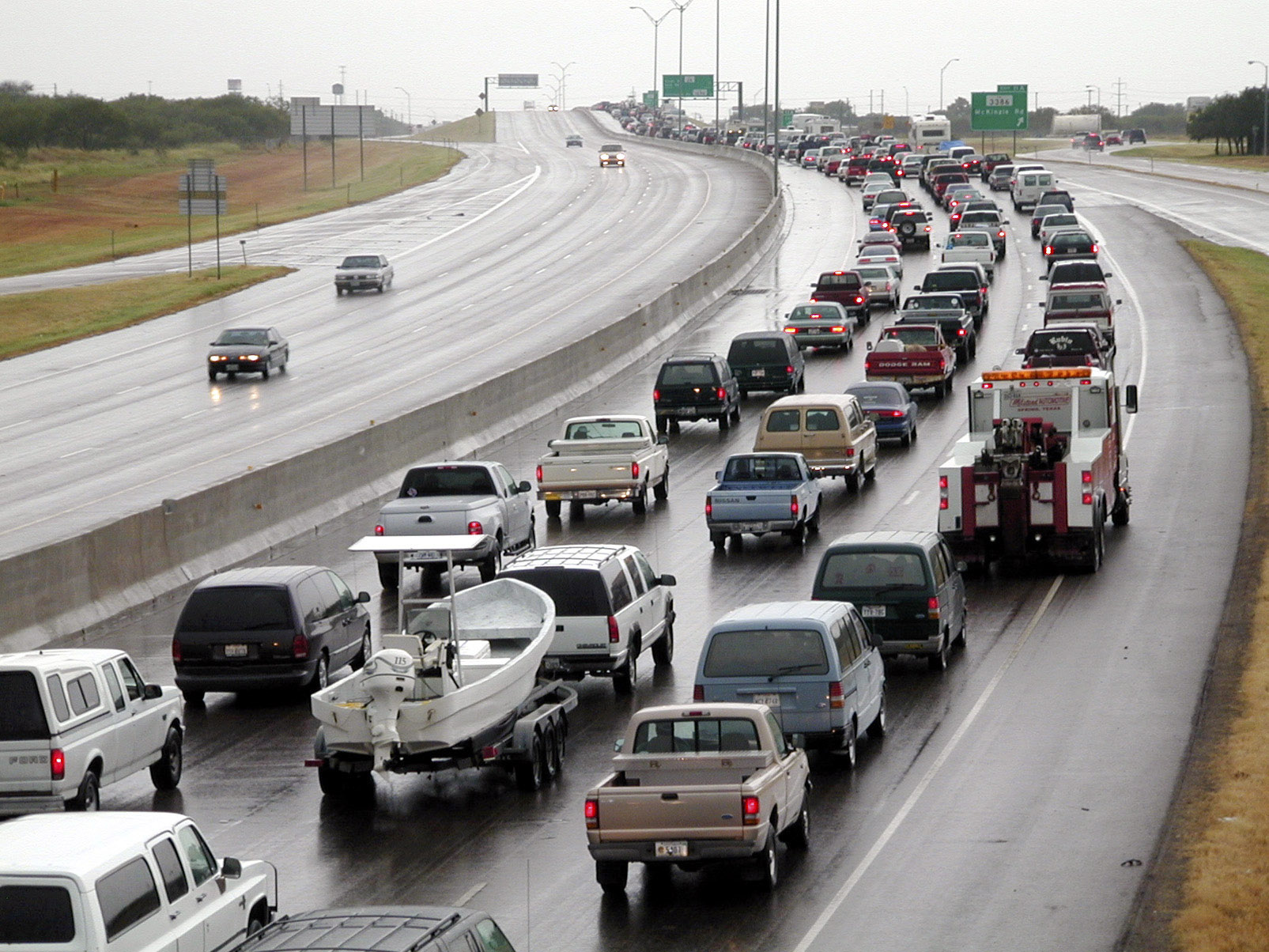
Residents evacuating Corpus Christi on August 22 on Interstate 37

On August 21, when Bret was first expected to approach the Texas coastline, the NHC issued a hurricane watch for coastal areas between the border of Mexico and Baffin Bay, Texas. Hours later, the watch was upgraded to a warning as the storm intensified and posed a more direct threat to the area. A tropical storm warning and hurricane watch were subsequently posted from Baffin Bay northward to Port Aransas. The following day, the hurricane warning was extended to include locations through Port O'Connor and the advisories were extended to Freeport. As Bret neared landfall, the hurricane watch between Port O'Connor and Freeport was discontinued. The hurricane warning for Port Aransas to Port O'Connor was discontinued hours after Bret made landfall and began to weaken. By late August 23, all watches and warnings in relation to the hurricane were discontinued.

By August 22, city officials in Corpus Christi, Texas, declared a state of emergency as Bret was considered a significant threat to the region. Tens of thousands of residents were urged to evacuate coastal areas and seek refuge in local shelters or with relatives further inland. An estimated 180,000 people in the state left their residences ahead of the storm. The Corpus Christi International Airport closed midday on August 22. Later that day, Texas State Highway 361 and docks in Port Aransas were shut down. Highways throughout the area were congested due to the large-scale evacuations and long lines for gas and emergency items developed. Three schools, two universities and a college were closed on August 23 and remained closed for several days.

Eleven shelters were opened in the San Antonio area, collectively able to accommodate 3,525 people. About 325 prisoners were evacuated from a Nueces County jail as the building they were in was deemed unsafe during hurricane conditions. About 1,000 sailors working in the area were evacuated to the USS Inchon prior to the storm. Originally, the ship was meant to ride out the storm at sea; however, inadequate repair work inhibited the ship from leaving port. The ship reportedly had enough supplies to maintain the sailors for roughly 45 days. By 12:00 pm CDT on August 22, Mustang Island and Padre Island were completely evacuated and officials shut down roads leading in and out of the islands to prevent anyone from re-entering them before the area was deemed safe to enter. A strict order against price gouging was put in place by city officials in Corpus Christi.

=== Mexico ===
In Mexico, officials closed 18 ports on the Gulf of Mexico to small- and medium-sized craft in preparation for the storm. In northern Mexico, more than 500 shelters were opened as thousands of residents were advised to evacuate from low-lying areas. The Mexican Army, Red Cross, and firefighters were put on standby to deal with emergency calls during the storm. On August 22, a state of emergency was declared for Tamaulipas. The following day, at least 120 firefighters were dispatched to Monterrey, Nuevo León, to swiftly respond to emergencies. The Mexican government emphasized the safety of residents in the city, which was anticipated to bear the brunt of the hurricane. Around 7,000 fishermen evacuated coastal regions near the Texas border. In Matamoros an additional 31 shelters were opened. Schools throughout northern Mexico were closed for several days.

== Impact ==
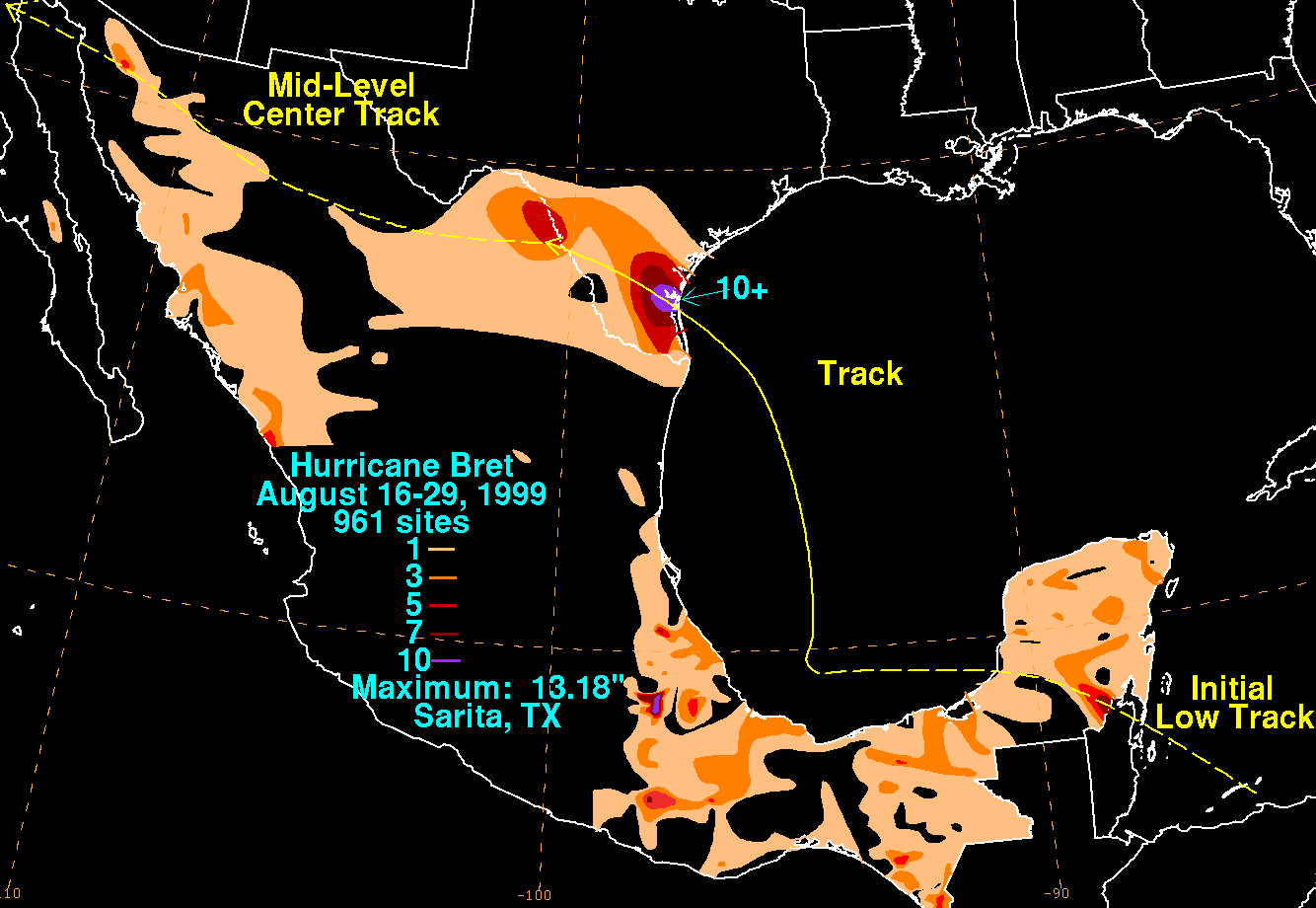
Rainfall totals from Hurricane Bret in Mexico and Texas

=== Mexico ===
Prior to developing into a tropical depression, the disturbance produced scattered rainfall across the Yucatán Peninsula, locally exceeding 7 in (180 mm). As the system stalled in the Bay of Campeche, coastal areas received minor rainfall from the outer bands of the system. Although Bret made landfall near the Texas-Mexico border, the small size of the system resulted in limited impacts in Mexico. In Nuevo León, an estimated 14 in (360 mm) of rain fell within a 24-hour span and similar amounts likely fell in nearby Tamaulipas. In Tamaulipas, Nuevo León and Coahuila, ten villages were isolated by floodwaters that washed out roads. Ten people, all members of one family, were injured during a head-on collision. In Nogales, heavy rains caused water to accumulate on streets, leading to traffic jams; high winds also downed power lines. During the evacuation prior to Bret, one person was trampled to death. Following landfall, a man was electrocuted by downed power lines and another drowned in floodwaters. At least 150 families were left homeless following a flash flood in Cadereyta that inundated most of the town.

=== Texas ===
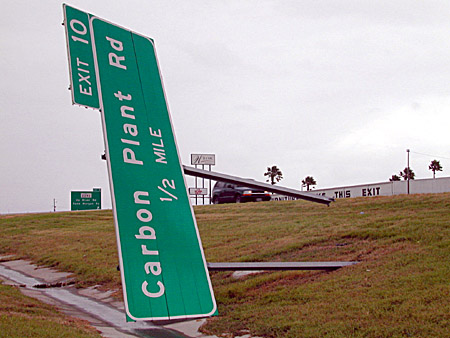
A sign blown down along Interstate 37 in Corpus Christi

Upon making landfall, Bret produced a storm surge up to 8.8 ft (2.7 m) on Matagorda Island, Texas. Around Galveston, minor beach erosion was recorded due to large swells produced by the hurricane. Twelve new inlets were created on Padre Island, one of which was large enough to be mistaken as Mansfield Pass. Heavy precipitation, reaching 13.18 in (335 mm) in central Kenedy County, was confined to a small area. The lowest barometric pressure recorded overland was at the Brooks County Airport at 976 mbar (hPa; 28.8 inHg). The Aransas River rapidly reached flood stage due to heavy rains and the Rio Grande produced minor flooding close to the Gulf of Mexico. In beaches near Corpus Christi, upwards of 40 cubic feet (1.1 m^{3}) of sand was lost. About 24.7 acres (10.0 ha) of cropland were destroyed by the storm.

A damaged electric tower in Kenedy County resulted in power outages for thousands of people. At the height of the storm, an estimated 64,000 people were without power in south Texas. Portions of U.S. Route 281 were submerged in floodwaters, leaving $50,000 (1999 USD) in damage. Damage in Corpus Christi were estimated at $100,000 (1999 USD). In Duval County, 200 homes were damaged by flooding and large areas of agricultural land were flooded. Damage in the county amounted to roughly $2 million (1999 USD). Five other F0 tornadoes touched down in the state. Damage to homes and businesses in Corpus Christi was estimated up to $500,000 (1999 USD); agricultural damage reached $1 million and another $500,000 (1999 USD) was reported in losses. Slick roads from Bret's heavy rains caused the collision of a truck and a tractor, killing four people. Damage amounted to $15 million (1999 USD) throughout southern Texas.

== Aftermath ==
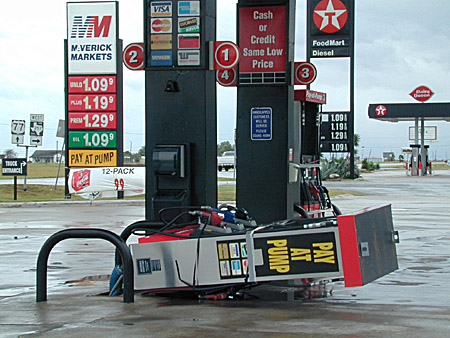
A gas pump blown over by Hurricane Bret in Texas

On August 23, the Federal Emergency Management Agency (FEMA) deployed 717 personnel, mainly from the disaster response team, to the affected regions in the United States. The following day, 564 National Guard troops were deployed in the state. In the days following the storm, many mosquitoes and other insects laid eggs in areas of standing water, causing a large increase in their numbers. Authorities sprayed insecticide to minimize the potential for disease outbreaks. By August 25, all shelters opened prior to Bret were closed as residents were allowed to return home. On August 26, President Bill Clinton added the counties of Brooks, Duval, Jim Wells and Webb to the major disaster declaration area. This allowed residents in those counties to receive federal funding.

Reconstruction of public facilities, roads, and water pipes received increased funding on September 3 to speed up the program. The following day, twelve disaster recovery centers were opened in the affected counties for residents to apply for federal funding. On September 9, two more disaster recovery centers were opened for residents in south Texas. Later that day, $831,593.28 (1999 USD) in disaster housing grants was distributed to affected residents. On September 15, roughly 10,200 people applied for disaster loans, amounting to $3.1 million (1999 USD). A total of 167 also received crisis intervention from FEMA. In Corpus Christi, winds and rain covered the city in debris and brush, costing $200,000 (1999 USD) for cleanup.

== See also ==
- List of Texas hurricanes
- List of Category 4 Atlantic hurricanes
- Hurricane Harvey (2017) – Another Category 4 hurricane that caused unprecedented destruction and widespread flooding to Southeast Texas.
- Tropical Storm Beta (2020) - A tropical storm that organized in the southwestern Gulf of Mexico and made landfall in Texas.
- Hurricane Nicholas (2021) - A minimal category 1 hurricane that took a similar track before making landfall in Texas.
