= Dennis (disambiguation) =

Dennis is a given name (usually male) or surname.

Dennis may also refer to:

== Places ==
In the United States

- Dennis, Georgia (disambiguation), multiple places
- Dennis, Kansas
- Dennis, Massachusetts, a New England town
  - Dennis (CDP), Massachusetts, census-designated place in the town
- Dennis, Mississippi
- Dennis, North Carolina
- Dennis, Oklahoma
- Dennis, Texas
- Dennis Township, New Jersey

Elsewhere

- Dennis, Alberta, a locality in Canada

== Companies ==
- Dennis Eagle, manufacturer of refuse collection trucks
- Dennis' Horseradish, a brand of horseradish grown near Delhi, Ontario, Canada
- Dennis Publishing, one of the world's leading independent publishers
- Dennis Specialist Vehicles, coachbuilder and manufacturer of specialised commercial vehicles
- Dennis Brothers, defunct British motor vehicle manufacturer
- Pizzeria Dennis, a Finnish pizzeria chain

== Film, print and television ==
- Dennis the Squirrel, a character from the NBC/Qubo TV series VeggieTales
- Dennis, a fictional grey train from the TV series Thomas and Friends
- Dennis The Menace, a 1993 film released in the United Kingdom as Dennis
- Dennis the Menace, a US comic strip
- Dennis the Menace and Gnasher, a UK comic strip

== Other uses ==
- Dennis railway station, railway station in Melbourne, Victoria, Australia
- List of storms named Dennis, tropical and extra-tropical cyclones bearing the name
- USS Dennis (DE-405), World War II John C. Butler-class destroyer escort in the service of the United States Navy
- Hurricane Dennis, a destructive Atlantic hurricane in 2005

== See also ==
- Denis (disambiguation)
- Denise (given name)
