= Rafkin =

Rafkin is a surname. Notable people with the surname include:

- Alan Rafkin (1928–2001), American director
- Bob Rafkin (1944–2013), American singer-songwriter
- Dennis Rafkin, Finnish businessman, founder of Pizzeria Dennis chain
- Ruben Rafkin (born 2002), Finnish ice hockey player

== See also ==
- Rifkin
