= Saint Dionysius (disambiguation) =

Pope Dionysius (died 268) was a Greek pope.

Saint Dionysius may also refer to:

- Dionysius the Areopagite (died late first century), Greek bishop and judge of the Areopagus
- Dionysius of Corinth (died c. 171), Bishop of Corinth
- Dionysius of Paris (died c. 250), Christian martyr
- Dionysius of Alexandria (died 265), Bishop of Alexandria
- Dionysius (died 447), one of the Seven Sleepers of Ephesus
- Dionysius Exiguus (c. 470 – c. 544), Byzantine monk who invented AD dating
- Dionysius Vattasseril (1858–1934), or Dionysius of India, primate of the Indian Orthodox Church

== See also ==
- Agios Dionyssios (disambiguation)
- Dennis (disambiguation)
- Dionysos (disambiguation)
- Saint Denis (disambiguation)
- San Dionisio (disambiguation)
