= Climate change in North Carolina =

Climate change in the US state of North Carolina

Current Köppen climate classification types of North Carolina

Climate change in North Carolina is of concern due to its impacts on the environment, climate, people, and economy of North Carolina. "Most of the state has warmed one-half to one degree (F) in the last century, and the sea is rising about one inch every decade." North Carolina, along with the rest of the Southeastern United States, has warmed less than the rest of the country.

== Temperature and climate ==
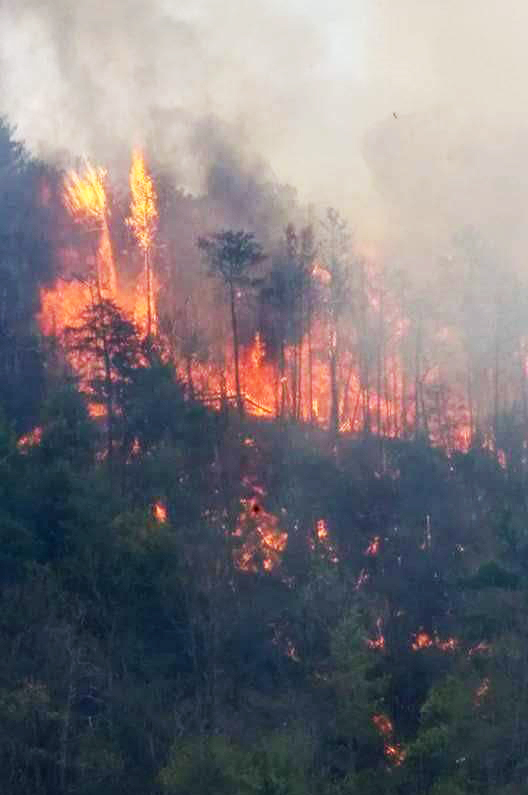
Silver Mine wildfire, 2016

Around the year 2080, "temperatures are likely to rise above 95°F approximately 20 to 40 days per year in most of the state, compared with about 10 days per year" in 2016.

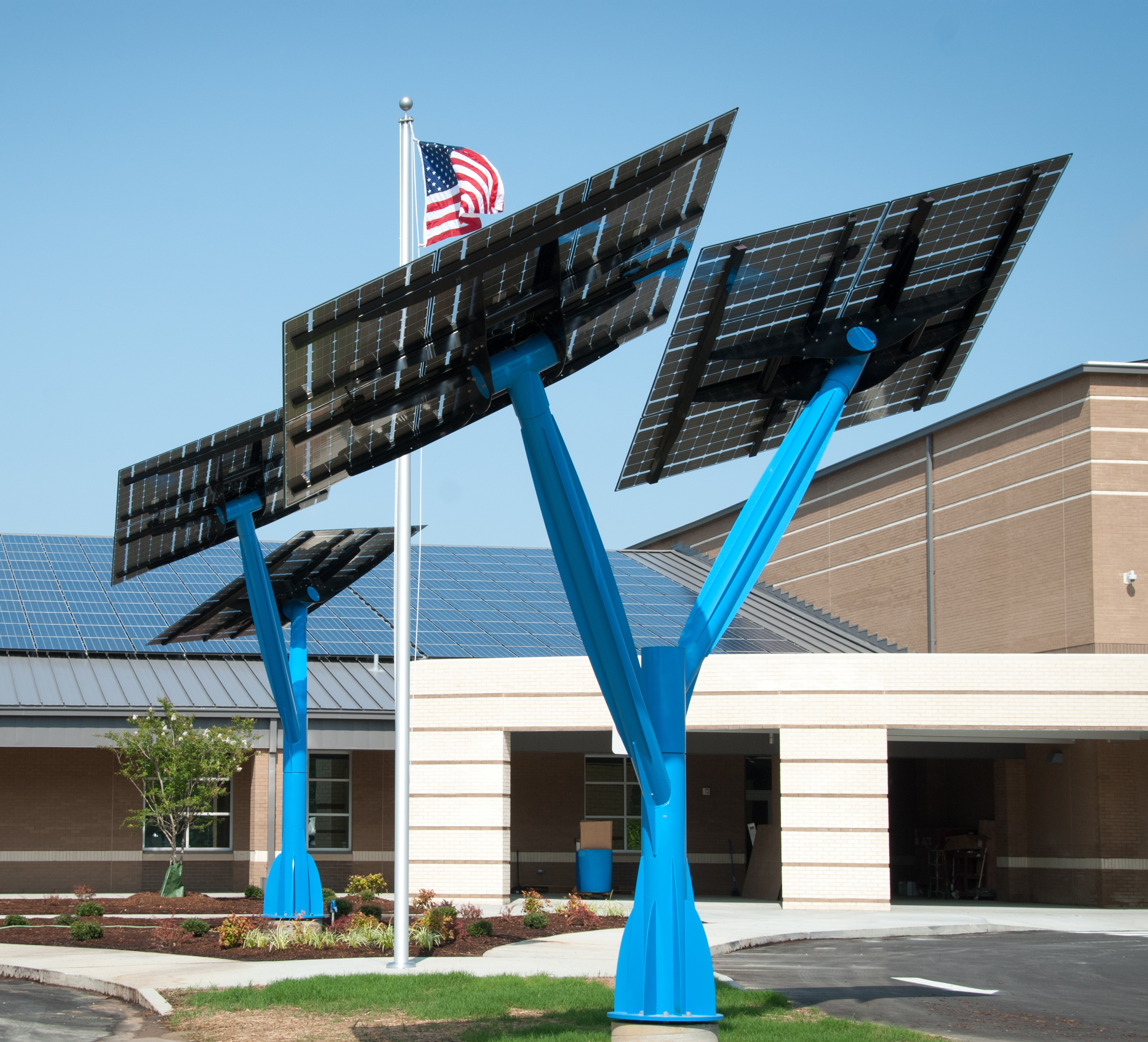
Solar installation, Sandy Grove Middle School, Robeson County.

If current warming trends continue, by 2080 "North Carolina will likely feel like the Florida Panhandle or possibly like northern Mexico within a generation."

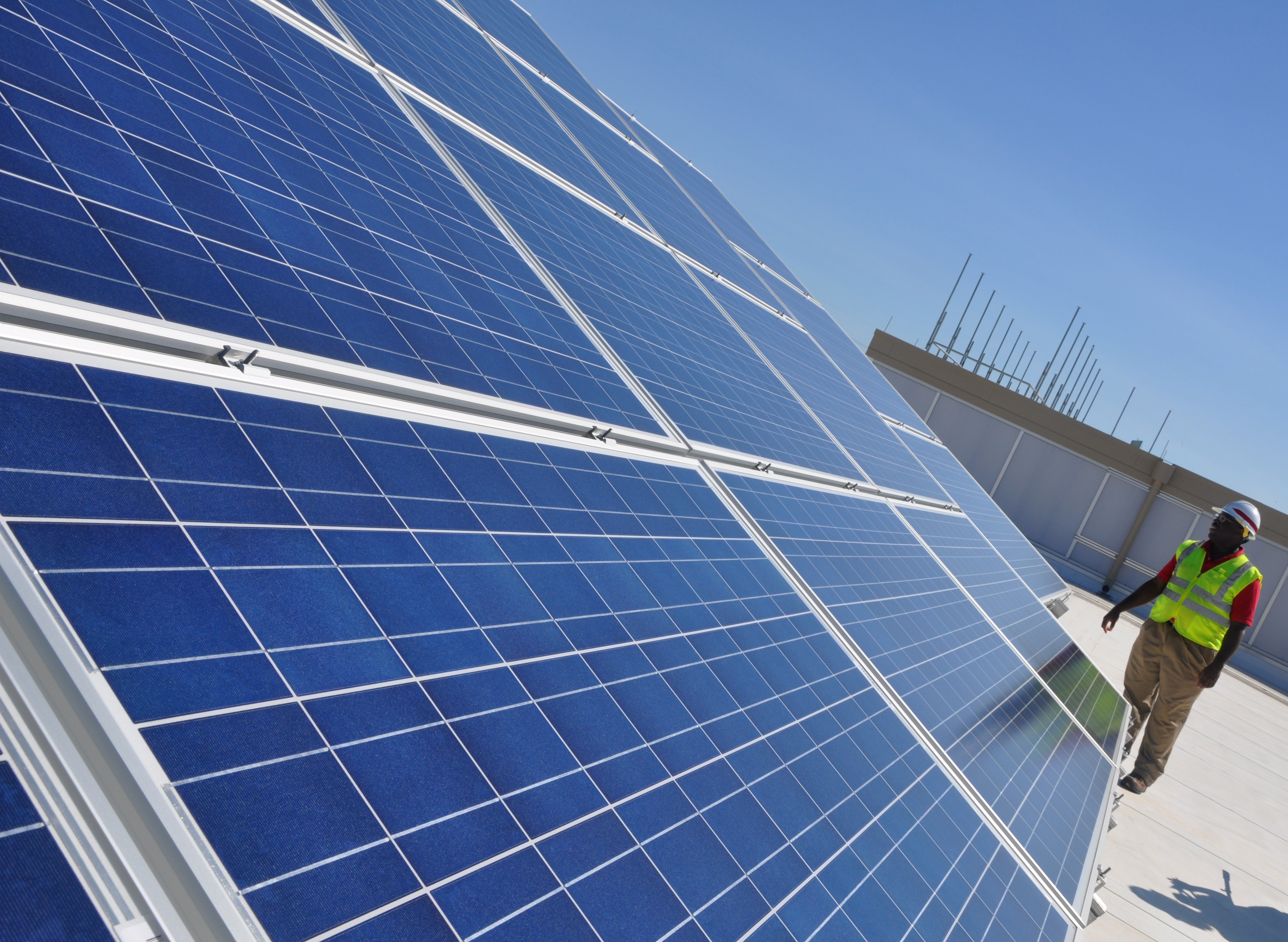
Solar installation, Fort Bragg

The State Climate Office predicts as of 2020 that temperatures will increase 4-10 degrees Fahrenheit by the end of the century.

== Coastline ==
"The United States Geological Survey estimates that the lightly developed Outer Banks between Nags Head and Ocracoke could be broken up by new inlets or lost to erosion if sea level rises two feet by the year 2100."

Rising sea levels will threaten inland areas because storm surges will get higher as sea level rises. Global sea level rise is caused by melting land ice, and also the fact that warmer water occupies a larger volume (thermal expansion).

=== Hurricanes ===
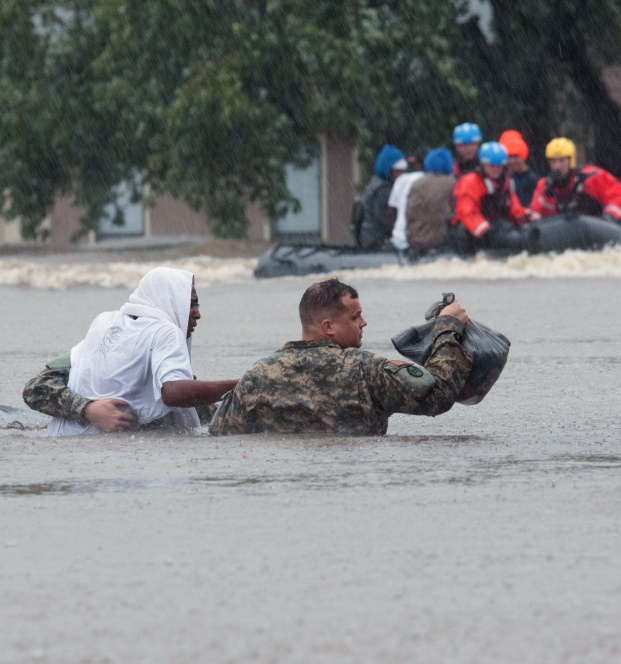
Rescue during Hurricane Matthew, Fayetteville, 2016

Tropical storms and hurricanes have become more intense in recent years. While warming waters make these storms more intense, "scientists are not sure whether the recent intensification represents a long-term trend." But it is likely that storms will tend to worsen as the climate warms.

Ensemble analysis of Hurricane Florence indicated that heightened temperatures led to a more intense hurricane, with higher precipitation (~5% higher) and a wider diameter (~1.5 miles, ~1.6%).

== Ecosystems ==
With rising sea levels, salt water can make its way farther upstream. The increased salinity can kill some types of trees found in swamp areas. "Salt water also reacts with some wetland soils, which causes the surface of the wetlands to sink below the water, adding to the loss of wetlands." This has already occurred, for example, near Camden Point.

== Political responses to climate change ==
Though several cities, municipalities, and school have been commended for their responses to climate change, the state as a whole has lagged behind.

=== State action ===
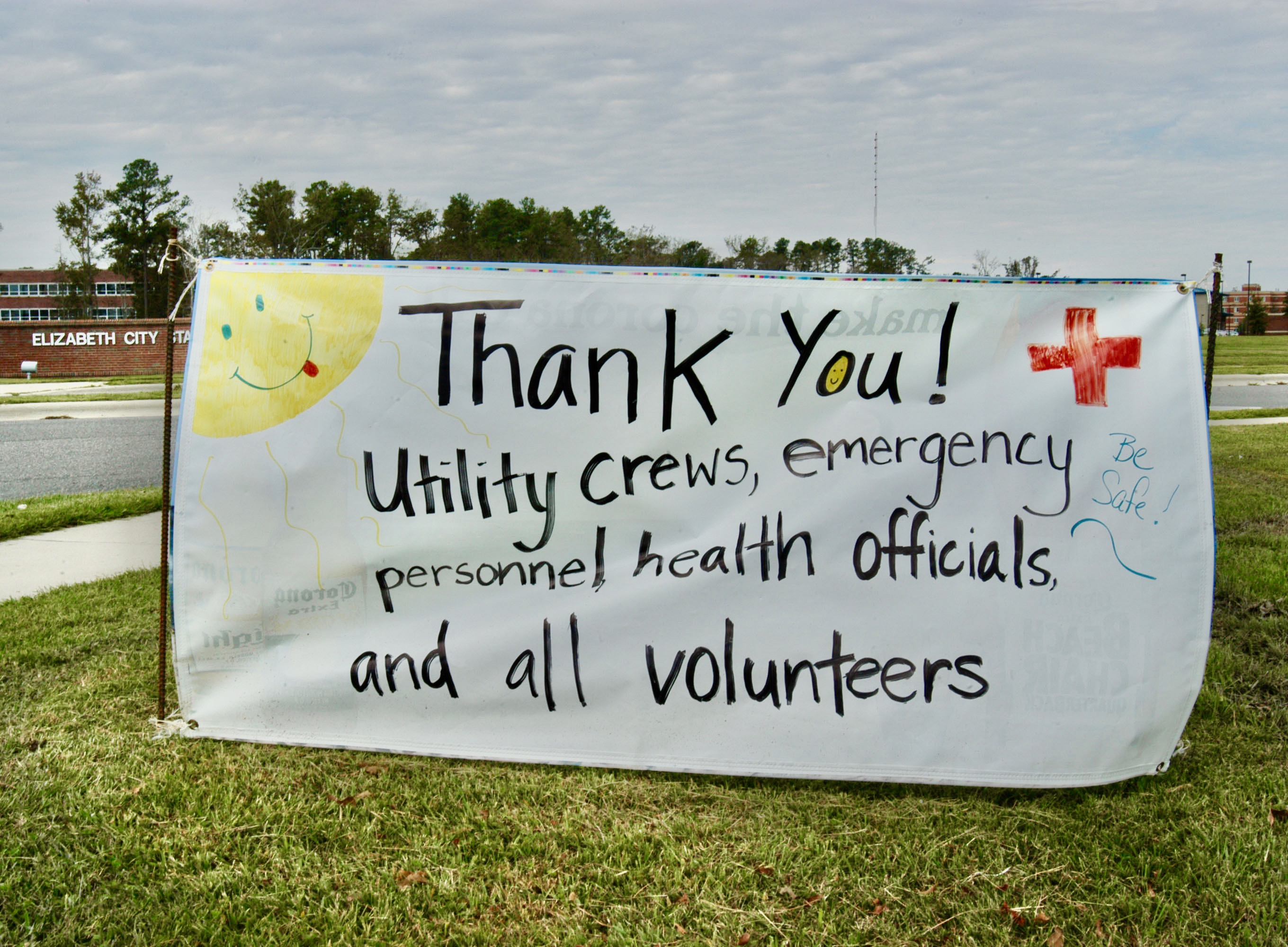
Sign thanking first responders, Hurricane Isabel, 2003.

In 2012, in response to a study by the United States Geological Survey which predicts accelerating sea level rise, the legislature of North Carolina "passed a law requiring that projected rates of sea level rise be calculated on historical trends and not include accelerated rates of increase."

A July 2019 law revised local land-use and planning requirements. Comprehensive plans that incorporate flood risk will now be required at the local level.

In 2020, the North Carolina Office of Recovery and Resiliency Planning is preparing a "resilience quick start guide" for local communities, to "build resilience into routine decisions such as infrastructure upgrades or zoning rulings."

=== Local action ===
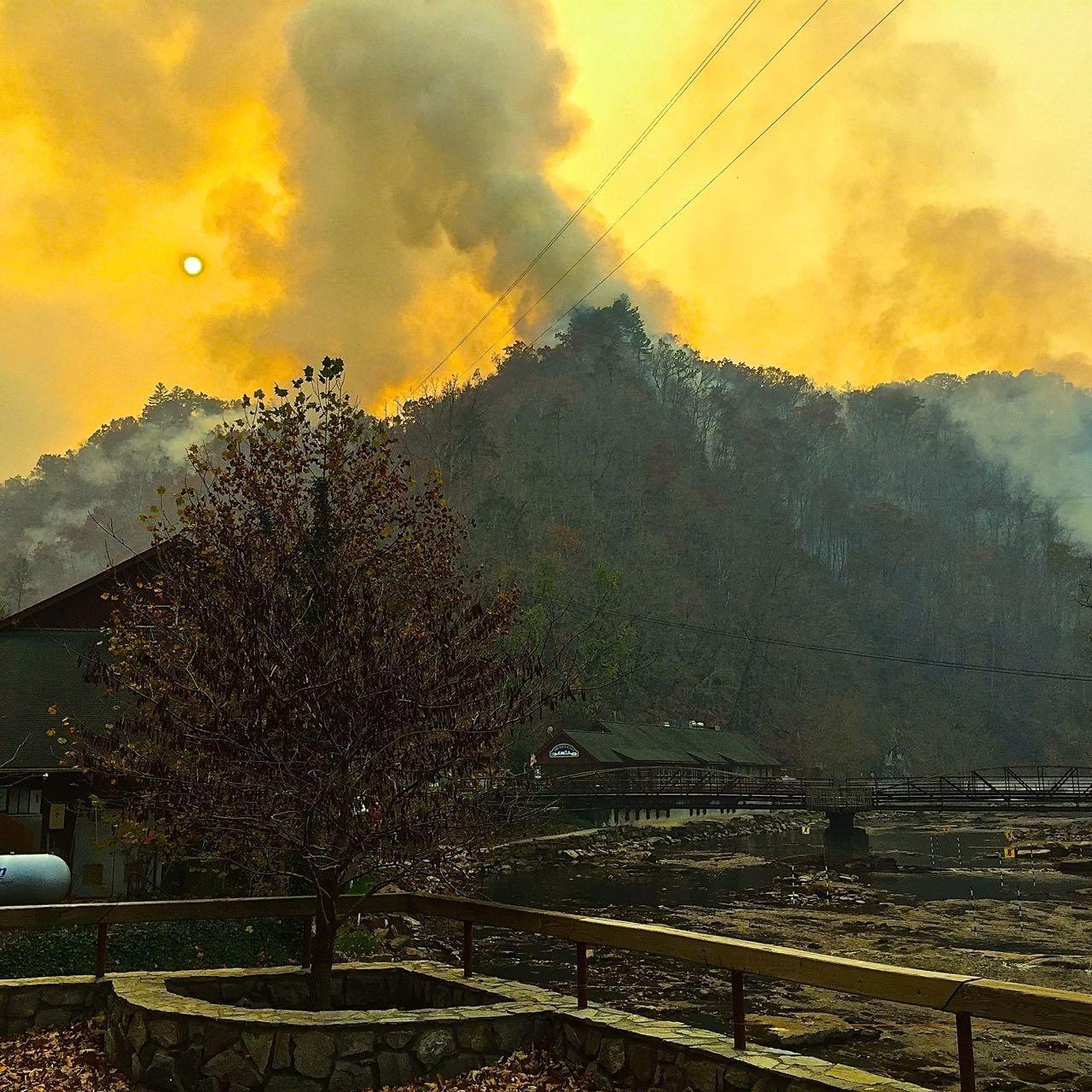
Smoke and air pollution, Tellico Fire, 2016

The city of Charlotte passed a plan to "emit nearly zero carbon from its buildings and vehicle fleet by 2030 and lower the per-capita carbon emissions from Charlotteans by a factor of six." Two days after the plan was passed by the city council, Michael Bloomberg announced that Charlotte was the winner of the American Cities Climate Challenge.

In fall of 2016, the University of North Carolina at Chapel Hill unrolled the "Three Zeroes Initiative," which is the university's commitment to reduce to zero the net usage of water, the amount of waste in landfills, and the net amount of greenhouse gas emissions.

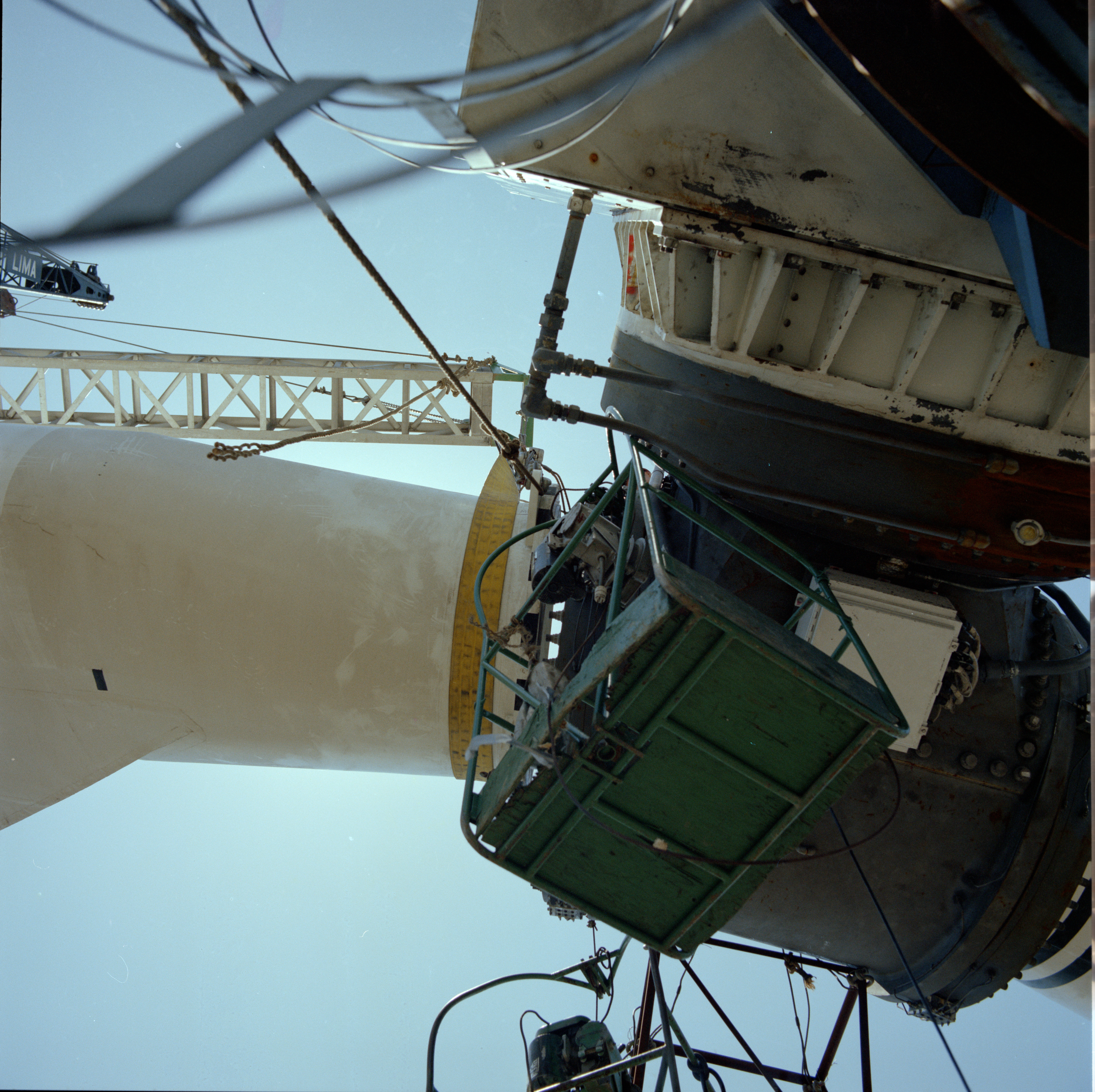
Wind turbine installation, Boone

In 2016, the city of Asheville, in cooperation with the University of North Carolina at Asheville's National Environmental Modeling and Analysis Center, began work on a climate resiliency assessment, designed to "lessen the impacts of future extreme weather and climate change." Asheville has earned the moniker the "Climate City" for its housing the headquarters of the National Centers for Environmental Information (the largest repository of environmental data in the world), the U.S. Air Force's 14th Weather Squadron ("which provides climate services to the defense and intelligence communities"), and also The Collider, a nonprofit that "is the first entrepreneurship and innovation center in the nation built to support startups – across almost every sector – that use data to help the world become more resilient to climate change."

== Public response ==
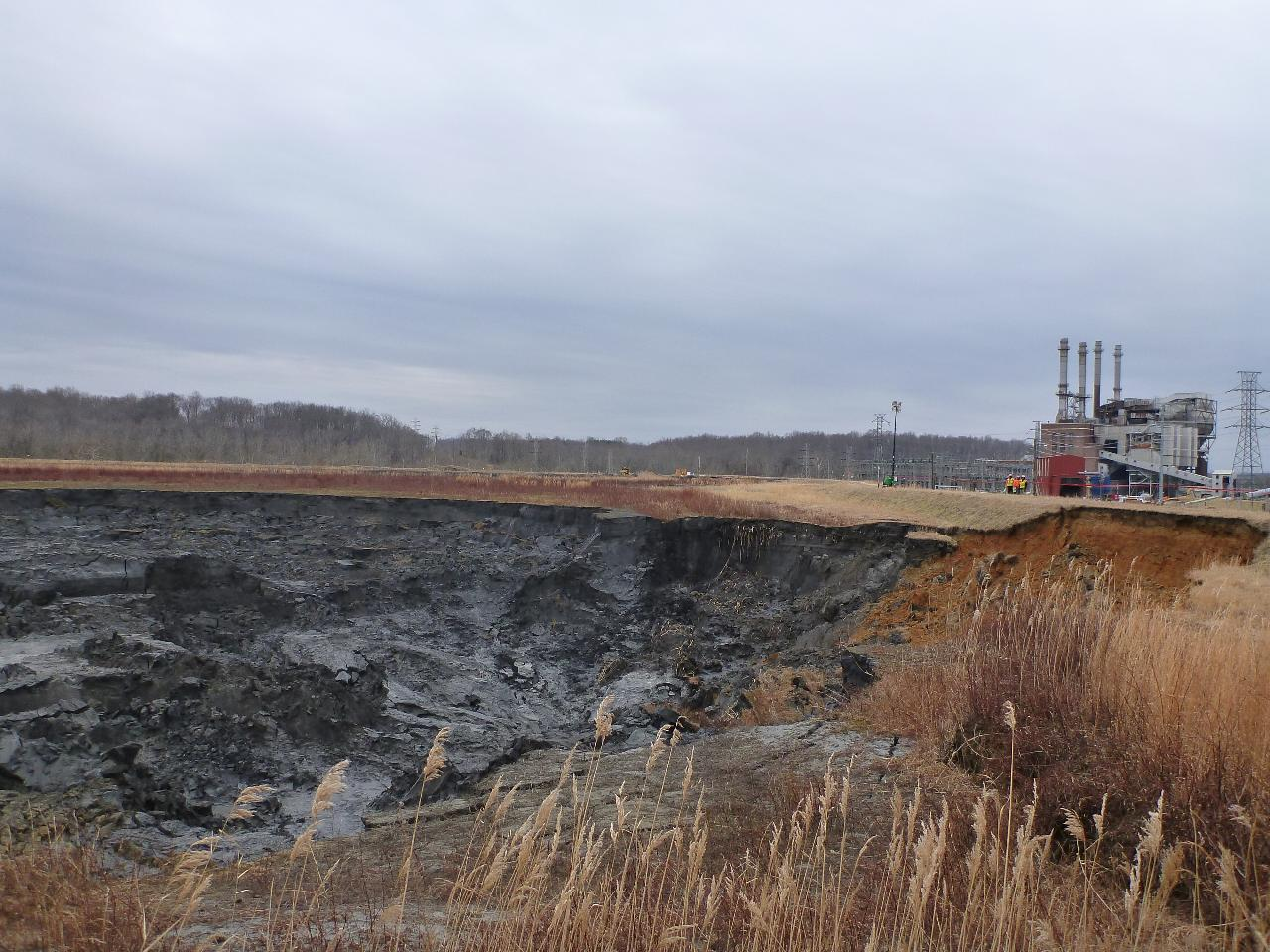
2014 coal ash spill, Dan River

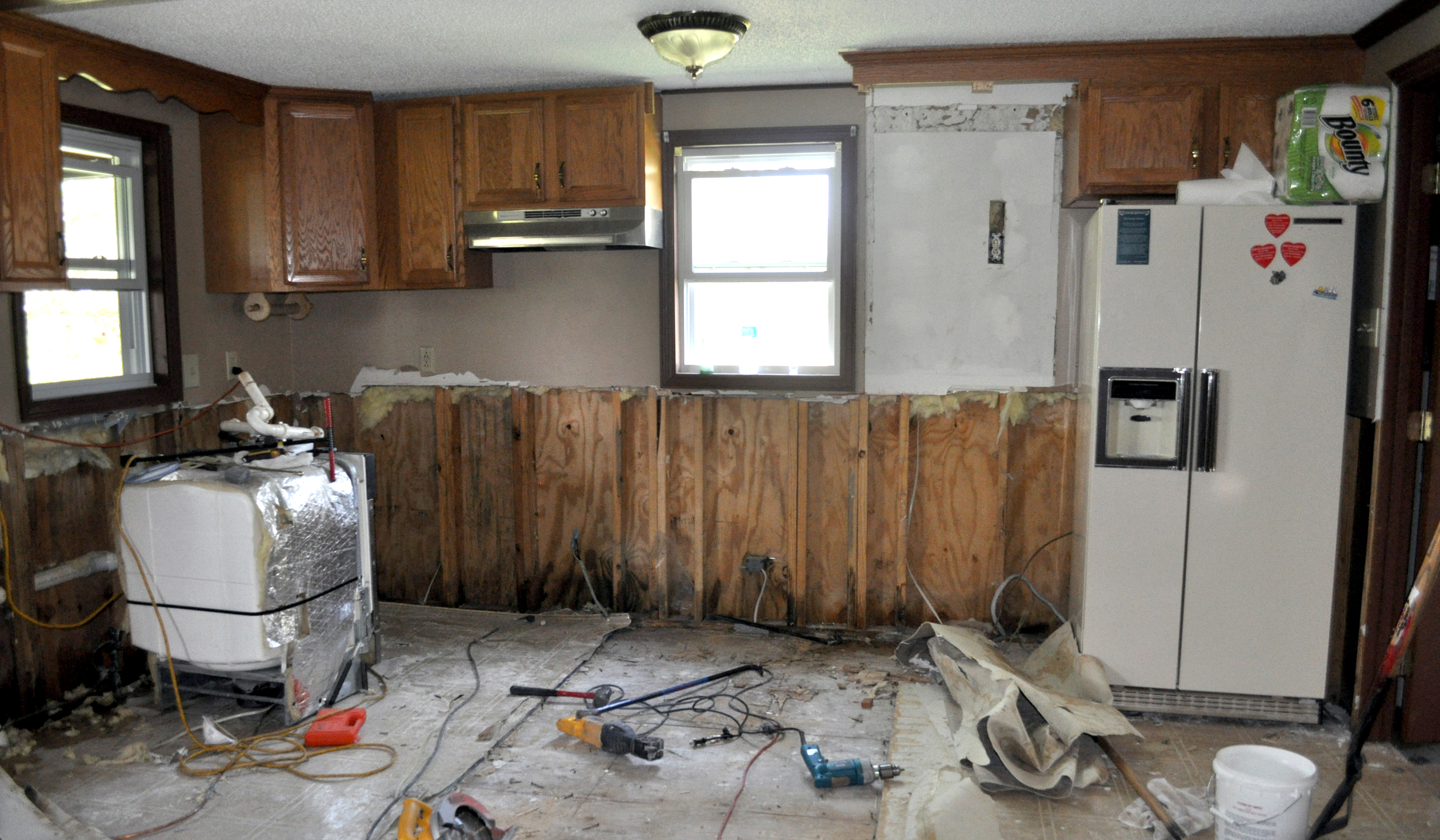
Rebuilding of flooded kitchen, Hurricane Irene, 2011.

Following Hurricane Florence, Elon University conducted a poll exploring public opinions on climate change. It found that 80 percent of North Carolinians though that North Carolina's coastal communities would be negatively affected by climate change in the next decade. Sixty-two percent supported consideration of climate change predictions in local planning and ordinances, 72 percent supported restriction of real-estate development in flood-prone areas, and over half agreed that hurricanes were increasing in severity.

== See also ==
- Environmental issues in the United States
- Climate of North Carolina
- Plug-in electric vehicles in North Carolina
