= Agios Dionyssios =

Agios Dionyssios may refer to:

- Agios Dionyssios, Patras, Greece
- SS Agios Dionyssios, a ship

== See also ==
- Saint Dionysius (disambiguation)
- San Dionisio (disambiguation)
