= Climate of North Carolina =

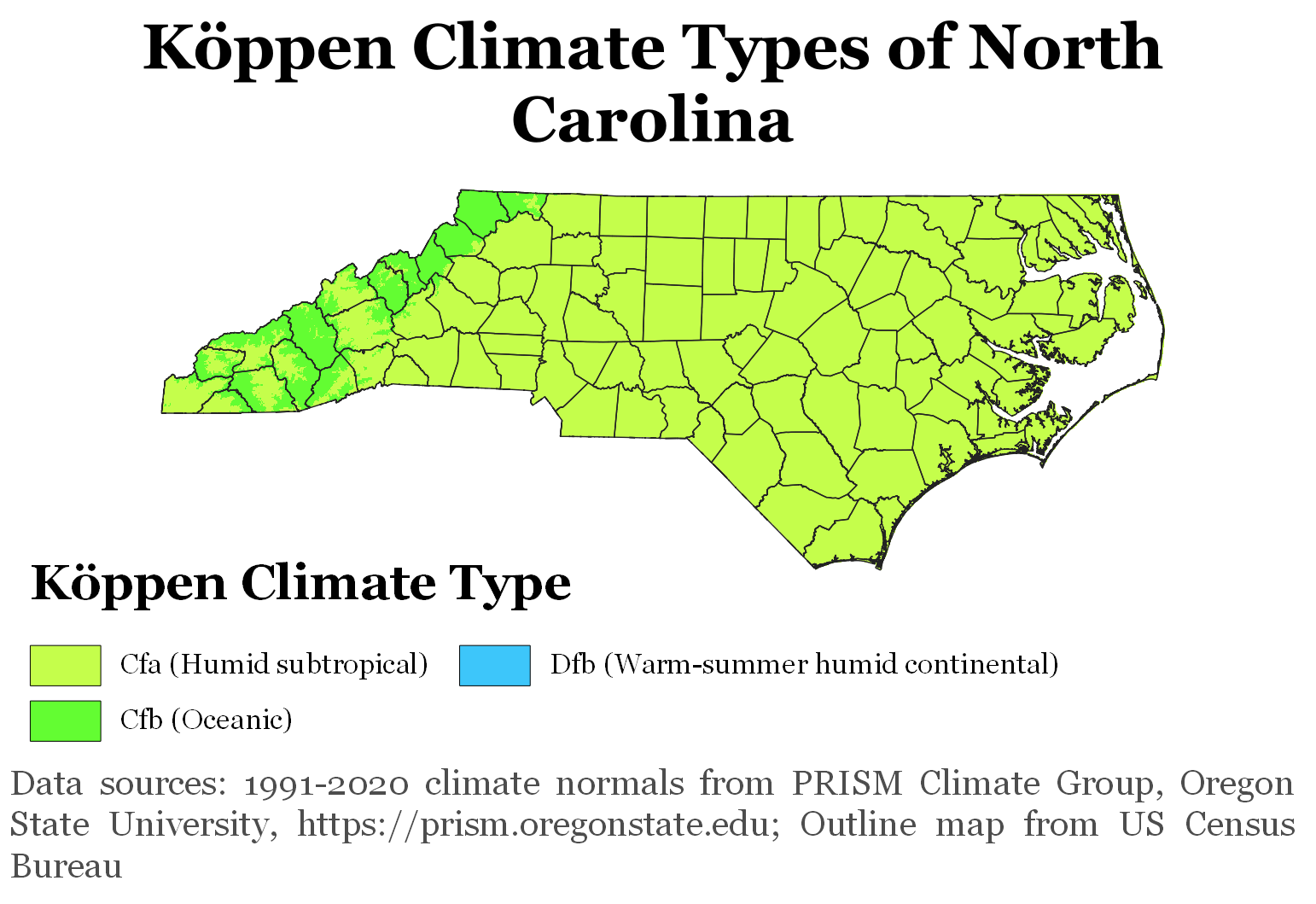
Köppen climate types of North Carolina, using 1991-2020 climate normals.

The climate of North Carolina varies considerably from the Atlantic coast in the east to the Appalachian Mountains in the west. The mountains often act as a "shield", blocking low temperatures and storms from Canada and the Midwest from entering the Piedmont and Coastal Plain of North Carolina.

Most of the state has a humid subtropical climate (Köppen climate classification Cfa), except in the higher elevations of the Appalachians which have a subtropical highland climate (Köppen Cfb).

The USDA Hardiness Zones for the state range from Zone 5B (-15 °F to -10 °F) in the mountains to Zone 9A (20 °F to 25 °F) along the easternmost portions of the coast.

For most areas of North Carolina, the temperatures in July during the daytime are approximately 90 °F (32 °C). In January, the average daytime temperatures can widely vary across the state, ranging from approximately 40 °F (4 °C) in the higher elevations of the Appalachians, near 50 °F (10 °C) in the Piedmont region, to around 60 °F (16 °C) along the southeastern coastal areas of the state.

== Precipitation ==
There is an average of 1,100 millimetres or 45 inches of rain a year (1,300 millimetres or 50 inches in the mountainous regions). July storms account for much of this precipitation. As much as 15 percent of the rainfall during the warm season in North Carolina can be attributed to tropical cyclones. The western mountains usually see snowfall between November and March. Moist winds from the southwest drop an average of 80 inches (2,000 mm) of precipitation on the western side of the mountains, while the northeast-facing slopes average less than half that amount.

Average monthly precipitation
City	Jan	Feb	Mar	Apr	May	Jun	Jul	Aug	Sep	Oct	Nov	Dec	Total
Asheville	2.6 inches (66 mm)	3.1 inches (79 mm)	4 inches (100 mm)	3.3 inches (84 mm)	2.9 inches (74 mm)	3.5 inches (89 mm)	3.4 inches (86 mm)	4 inches (100 mm)	3.1 inches (79 mm)	2.7 inches (69 mm)	2.6 inches (66 mm)	2.7 inches (69 mm)	38.1 inches (970 mm)
Cape Hatteras	5.6 inches (140 mm)	4.1 inches (100 mm)	4.6 inches (120 mm)	3.2 inches (81 mm)	3.8 inches (97 mm)	4.2 inches (110 mm)	4.9 inches (120 mm)	6.4 inches (160 mm)	5.3 inches (130 mm)	5.3 inches (130 mm)	4.9 inches (120 mm)	4.5 inches (110 mm)	56.9 inches (1,450 mm)
Charlotte	3.7 inches (94 mm)	3.7 inches (94 mm)	4.6 inches (120 mm)	3 inches (76 mm)	3.6 inches (91 mm)	3.5 inches (89 mm)	3.8 inches (97 mm)	4.1 inches (100 mm)	3.3 inches (84 mm)	3.2 inches (81 mm)	3.1 inches (79 mm)	3.3 inches (84 mm)	43 inches (1,100 mm)
Greensboro	3.1 inches (79 mm)	3 inches (76 mm)	3.7 inches (94 mm)	3.6 inches (91 mm)	3.4 inches (86 mm)	3.7 inches (94 mm)	4.5 inches (110 mm)	3.9 inches (99 mm)	4.2 inches (110 mm)	3.1 inches (79 mm)	3.1 inches (79 mm)	3 inches (76 mm)	42.2 inches (1,070 mm)
Raleigh	3.5 inches (89 mm)	3.5 inches (89 mm)	3.7 inches (94 mm)	2.8 inches (71 mm)	3.8 inches (97 mm)	3.6 inches (91 mm)	4.4 inches (110 mm)	4.4 inches (110 mm)	3.1 inches (79 mm)	3 inches (76 mm)	2.9 inches (74 mm)	3.1 inches (79 mm)	41.8 inches (1,060 mm)
Wilmington	3.6 inches (91 mm)	3.5 inches (89 mm)	4.3 inches (110 mm)	2.9 inches (74 mm)	4.3 inches (110 mm)	5.4 inches (140 mm)	7.9 inches (200 mm)	7 inches (180 mm)	5.6 inches (140 mm)	3.3 inches (84 mm)	3.3 inches (84 mm)	3.5 inches (89 mm)	55 inches (1,400 mm)

=== Snow ===
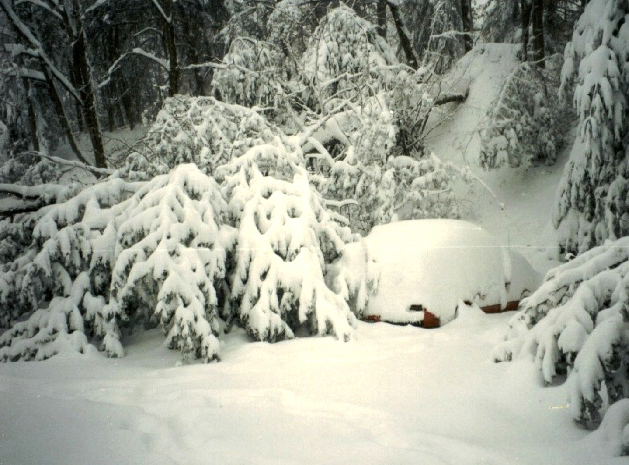
A downed tree in Asheville, North Carolina caused by snowfall from the 1993 Storm of the Century

Snow in North Carolina is seen on a regular basis in the mountains. North Carolina averages 5 inches (130 mm) of snow per winter season. However, this varies greatly across the state. Along the coast, most areas register less than 2 inches (5.1 cm) per year while the state capital, Raleigh, averages 6.0 inches (15 cm). Farther west in the Piedmont-Triad, the average grows to approximately 9 inches (23 cm). The Charlotte area averages approximately 5.0 inches (13 cm). The town of Boone, North Carolina, located at an elevation of 1,016 meters or 3,333 feet in the northwestern part of the state, receives on average nearly 25 inches (64 cm) of snowfall annually. The mountains in the west act as a barrier, preventing most snowstorms from entering the Piedmont. When snow does make it past the mountains, it is usually light and is seldom on the ground for more than two or three days. However, several storms have dropped 18 inches (46 cm) or more of snow within normally warm areas. The 1993 Storm of the Century that lasted from March 11 to March 15 affected locales from Canada to Central America, and brought exceptionally heavy snow to North Carolina. Newfound Gap received more than 36 inches (91 cm) of snow with drifts more than 5 feet (1.5 m), while Mount Mitchell measured over 4 feet (1.2 m) of snow with drifts to 14 feet (4.3 m). Most of the northwestern part of the state received somewhere between 2 feet (0.61 m) and 3 feet (0.91 m) of snow.

Another significant snowfall hit the Raleigh area in January 2000 when more than 20 inches (51 cm) of snow fell. There was also a heavy snowfall totaling 18 inches (46 cm) that hit the Wilmington area on December 22–23, 1989. This storm affected only the Southeastern US coast, as far south as Savannah, Georgia, with little to no snow measured west of I-95. Most big snows that impact areas east of the mountains come from extratropical cyclones which approach from the south across Georgia and South Carolina and move off the coast of North or South Carolina. These storms typically throw Gulf or Atlantic moisture over cold Arctic air at ground level, usually propelled southward from Arctic high pressure over the Northeastern or New England states. If the storms track sufficiently far to the east, snow will be limited to the eastern part of the state (as with the December 22–23, 1989, storm, and the January 4, 2018, storm that dropped 10 centimetres or 4 inches at Cape Hatteras, but virtually no snow in inland North Carolina locations). If the cyclones travel close to the coast, warm air will get pulled into eastern North Carolina due to increasing flow off the milder Atlantic Ocean, bringing a rain/snow line well inland with heavy snow restricted to the Piedmont, foothills and mountains, as with the January 22, 1987, storm that dropped 15 centimetres or 6 inches at Charlotte. If the storm tracks inland into eastern North Carolina, the rain/snow line ranges between Raleigh and Greensboro.

Average monthly snowfall
City	Jan	Feb	Mar	Apr	May	Jun	Jul	Aug	Sep	Oct	Nov	Dec	Total
Asheville	4.6 inches (12 cm)	4.6 inches (12 cm)	3 inches (7.6 cm)	0.7 inches (1.8 cm)	-	-	-	-	-	-	0.7 inches (1.8 cm)	2 inches (5.1 cm)	15.6 inches (40 cm)
Cape Hatteras	0.4 inches (1.0 cm)	0.6 inches (1.5 cm)	0.4 inches (1.0 cm)	-	-	-	-	-	-	-	-	0.6 inches (1.5 cm)	2 inches (5.1 cm)
Charlotte	2 inches (5.1 cm)	1.7 inches (4.3 cm)	1.2 inches (3.0 cm)	-	-	-	-	-	-	-	0.1 inches (0.25 cm)	0.5 inches (1.3 cm)	5.5 inches (14 cm)
Greensboro	3.4 inches (8.6 cm)	2.4 inches (6.1 cm)	0.8 inches (2.0 cm)	-	-	-	-	-	-	-	0.1 inches (0.25 cm)	0.8 inches (2.0 cm)	7.5 inches (19 cm)
Raleigh	2.2 inches (5.6 cm)	2.6 inches (6.6 cm)	1.3 inches (3.3 cm)	-	-	-	-	-	-	-	0.1 inches (0.25 cm)	0.8 inches (2.0 cm)	7 inches (18 cm)
Wilmington	0.4 inches (1.0 cm)	0.5 inches (1.3 cm)	0.4 inches (1.0 cm)	-	-	-	-	-	-	-	-	0.6 inches (1.5 cm)	1.9 inches (4.8 cm)

== Tropical cyclones ==
Hurricane Fran

Located along the Atlantic Coast, many hurricanes that come up from the Caribbean Sea travel along the East Coast of the United States, passing by North Carolina.

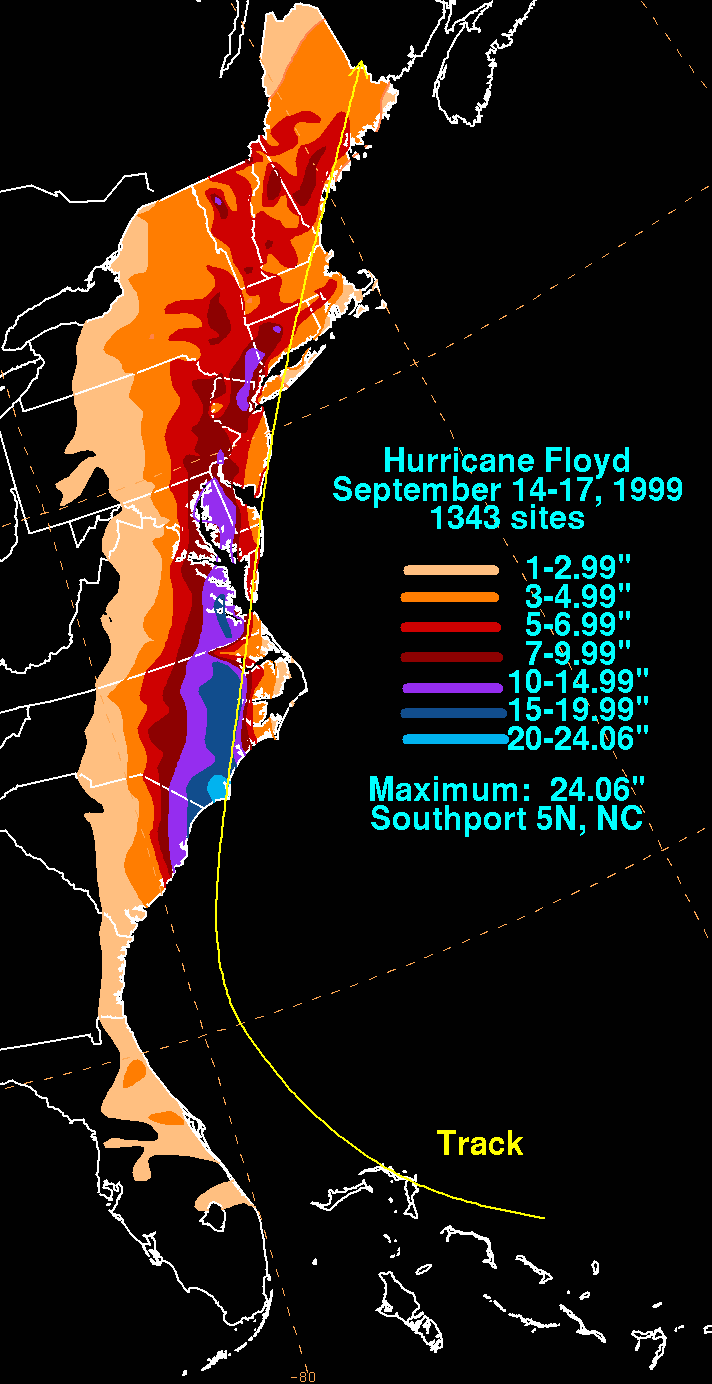
Rainfall from Hurricane Floyd in 1999

On October 15, 1954, Hurricane Hazel struck North Carolina, at that time it was a Category 4 hurricane within the Saffir-Simpson Hurricane Scale. Hazel caused significant damage due to its strong winds. A weather station at Oak Island reported maximum sustained winds of 140 miles per hour (230 km/h), while in Raleigh winds of 90 miles per hour (140 km/h) were measured. The hurricane caused 19 deaths and significant destruction. One person in Long Beach claimed that "of the 357 buildings that existed in the town, 352 were totally destroyed and the other five damaged". Hazel was described as "the most destructive storm in the history of North Carolina" in a 1989 report. Hazel remains the only Category 4 hurricane to ever make landfall in North Carolina.

In 1996, Hurricane Fran made landfall in North Carolina as a Category 3 hurricane. Fran caused significant wind and flood damage. Fran's maximum sustained wind speeds were 115 miles per hour (185 km/h), while North Carolina's coast saw surges of 8 feet (2.4 m) to 12 feet (3.7 m) above sea level. The amount of damage caused by Fran ranged from $1.275 to $2 billion in North Carolina.

In 2018, Hurricane Florence made landfall in North Carolina as a Category 1 hurricane. Although a low-end hurricane at landfall in terms of wind speed, the slow movement of Florence leading up to and following landfall contributed to the destructive persistence of rainbands over North Carolina between Wilmington and Elizabethtown. The training of rainbands over the same areas led to a swath of rainfall accumulations exceeding 30 inches (760 mm), and rainfall totals exceeded 10 inches (250 mm) over much of southeastern and south-central North Carolina. A maximum rainfall total of 35.93 inches (913 mm) was recorded around 7 miles (11 km) northwest of Elizabethtown, setting a new state record for the highest rainfall accumulation resulting from a tropical cyclone. The hurricane also produced 27 tornadoes across North Carolina. Damage statewide reached an estimated US $17 billion, more than the combined damage of Hurricane Floyd and Hurricane Matthew in the state, according to Governor Roy Cooper. Estimated insurance losses in North Carolina ranged between US $2.8-5 billion. Hurricane-related flooding damaged an estimated 75,000 structures, many of which had been previously damaged by Hurricane Matthew just two years prior.

In 2024, North Carolina was severely impacted by Hurricane Helene, primarily in its western Appalachian region, causing over 100 reported deaths and significant destruction of infrastructure and residential areas across multiple counties. After making landfall in the Big Bend region of Florida on September 27, the hurricane began to traverse over land across Georgia as a Category 2 hurricane and into the Appalachian mountain range as a strong tropical storm, bringing record rainfall to dozens of communities in western North Carolina, including Asheville, Boone, Chimney Rock, Lake Lure, Lansing, Montreat, and Swannanoa.

As a result of the historic rainfall, several rivers in the region overflowed and inundated entire communities, destroying homes and infrastructure, and severing power and communication services in several counties for prolonged periods. In addition, several dams were breached and mudslides occurred across the region, worsening existing damage.

According to meteorologist Ben Noll, Hurricane Helene released nearly 1.5 times more moisture in western North Carolina than in any prior previous recorded event in the region, with an estimated integrated vapor transport quantity of ~3,000 kilograms per meter per second. Helene surpassed the prior record of 1,883 kg/m/s. The amount of moisture and rainfall deposited in the region was considered exceptional due to its inland location, far from the East Coast and Gulf Coast.

The North Carolina State Climate Office at North Carolina State University reported that its Mount Mitchell weather station recorded 24.41 in (620 mm) of rainfall. The office referred to the total as "off the charts", comparing it to 16.5 in (420 mm) of rainfall being a once-in-1,000-year flood for the area. Asheville Regional Airport recorded 19.38 in (492 mm) of rainfall before a communication failure. A North Carolina Forest Service weather station recorded receiving 31.33 in (796 mm) of rain from September 25 to September 27, requiring further verification.

=== Rain ===
Heavy rains accompany tropical cyclones and their remnants which move northeast from the Gulf of Mexico coastline, as well as inland from the western subtropical Atlantic Ocean. Over the past 30 years, the wettest tropical cyclone to strike the state was Hurricane Florence in September 2018, which dropped over 35 inches (890 mm) of rainfall northwest of Elizabethtown. During hurricanes Hazel and Fran, the main force of destruction was from precipitation. Before Hurricane Floyd reached North Carolina, the state had already received large amounts of rain from Hurricane Dennis less than two weeks before Floyd. This saturated much of the western North Carolina soil and allowed heavy rains from Hurricane Floyd to turn into floods. Over 35 people died from Floyd. In the mountains, Hurricane Frances of September 2004 was nearly as wet, bringing over 23 inches (580 mm) of rainfall to Mount Mitchell.

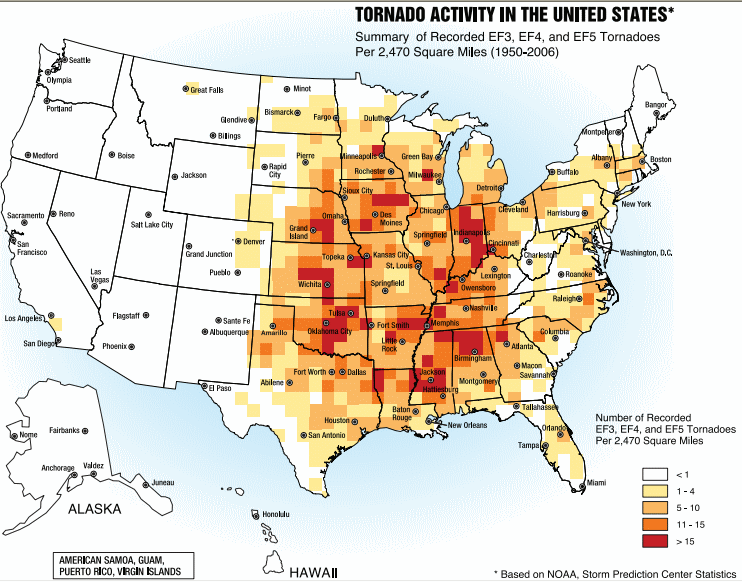
Tornado activity in the United States

== Severe weather ==
In most years, the greatest weather-related economic loss incurred in North Carolina is due to severe weather spawned by summer thunderstorms. These storms affect limited areas, with their hail and wind accounting for an average annual loss of over US $5 million.

North Carolina averages 31 tornadoes a year, with May typically seeing the most tornadoes of any month, with an average of 5. June, July and August all have an average of 3 tornadoes. The average in September increases slightly, having an average of 4. From September through early November, North Carolina can experience smaller yet severe bouts of weather. While the severe weather season usually spans from March to May, tornadoes have touched down in North Carolina in every month of the year. On November 28, 1988, an early morning F4 tornado smashed across northwestern Raleigh, continuing 84 miles further, killing 4 and injuring 157. On February 6, 2020, severe storms hit North Carolina, with a tornado beginning in Rowan County, north of Charlotte. as it travelled north, wind speeds picked up to 30 miles per hour. By 4:00 PM local time, 100,000 people were without power and flash flood warnings were in effect for much of the area due to heavy rainfall. After the initial event, a flood watch remained in effect until February 13 as a result of the saturated grounds.

== Changes ==
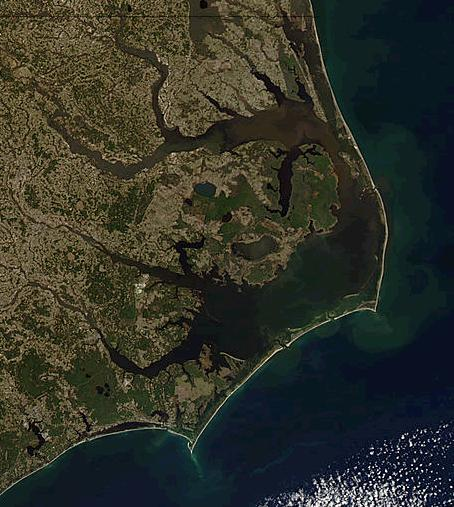
Much of North Carolina's Outer and Inner Banks could be at or below sea level.

The North Carolina coastline is expected to rise between one and four feet in the next century due to a combination of warming oceans, melting ice, and land subsidence. Temperatures in North Carolina have risen since the Industrial Revolution. Over the last 100 years, the average temperature in Chapel Hill has gone up 1.2 °F (0.7 °C) and precipitation in some parts of the state has increased by 5 percent. Around the year 2080, "temperatures are likely to rise above 95 °F approximately 20 to 40 days per year in most of the state, compared with about 10 days per year" in 2016.

== Seasonal conditions ==
=== Winter ===
In winter, North Carolina is somewhat protected by the Appalachian Mountains to the west. Cold fronts from Canada are typically reduced in intensity by the mountains. However, occasionally cold air can move from the north or northeast, east of the Appalachian Mountains, from Arctic high pressure systems that settle over the Northeastern or New England states. Other polar and Arctic outbreaks can cross the mountains and force temperatures to drop to about 12 °F (−11 °C) in central North Carolina. Still, temperatures below zero degrees Fahrenheit are extremely rare outside of the mountains. The coldest ever recorded temperature in North Carolina was −34 °F (−37 °C) on January 21, 1985, at Mount Mitchell. The winter temperatures on the coast are milder due to the warming influence of the Atlantic Ocean and the Gulf Stream. The average ocean temperature in Southport in January is still higher than the average ocean temperature in Maine during July. Snow is common in the mountains, although many ski resorts use snowmaking equipment to make sure there is always snow on their land. North Carolina's relative humidity is highest in the winter.

=== Spring ===
Tornadoes are most likely in the spring. Major tornado outbreaks affected parts of eastern North Carolina on March 28, 1984, and April 16, 2011. The month of May experiences the greatest rise in temperatures. During the spring, there are warm days and cool nights in the Piedmont. Temperatures are somewhat cooler in the mountains and warmer, particularly at night, near the coast. North Carolina's humidity is lowest in the spring.

=== Summer ===
North Carolina experiences hot and humid summer temperatures, with often tropical overnight lows. It remains colder at high elevations, with the average summer temperature in Mount Mitchell lying at 68 °F (20 °C). Morning temperatures are on average 20 °F (12 °C) lower than afternoon temperatures, except along the Atlantic Coast. The largest economic loss from severe weather in North Carolina is due to severe thunderstorms in the summer, although they usually only hit small areas. Tropical cyclones can impact the state during the summer as well. Fogs are also frequent in the summer.

=== Fall ===
Fall is the most rapidly changing season temperature wise, especially in October and November. Tropical cyclones remain a threat until late in the season. The Appalachian Mountains are frequently visited at this time of year, due to the leaves changing color in the trees.

=== Southern Oscillation ===
During El Niño events, winter and early spring temperatures are cooler than average with above average precipitation in the central and eastern parts of the state and drier weather in the western part. La Niña usually brings warmer than average temperatures with above average precipitation in the western part of the state while the central and coastal regions stay drier than average.

== Climate data ==
Average monthly temperature (Fahrenheit)
Building	Jan	Feb	Mar	Apr	May	Jun	Jul	Aug	Sep	Oct	Nov	Dec
Asheville	46/26	50/28	58/35	66/42	74/51	80/58	83/63	82/62	76/55	67/43	57/35	49/29
Cape Hatteras	54/39	55/39	60/44	68/52	75/60	82/68	85/73	85/72	81/68	73/59	65/50	57/43
Charlotte	51/32	56/34	64/42	73/49	80/58	87/66	90/71	88/69	82/63	73/51	63/42	54/35
Greensboro	47/28	52/31	60/38	70/46	77/55	84/64	88/68	86/67	79/60	70/48	60/39	51/31
Raleigh	50/30	54/32	62/39	72/46	79/55	86/64	89/68	87/67	81/61	72/48	62/40	53/33
Wilmington	56/36	60/38	66/44	74/51	81/60	86/68	90/72	88/71	84/66	76/54	68/45	60/38

Climate data for Charlotte (Köppen Cfa)
Month	Jan	Feb	Mar	Apr	May	Jun	Jul	Aug	Sep	Oct	Nov	Dec	Year
Record high °F (°C)	79 (26)	82 (28)	91 (33)	96 (36)	98 (37)	104 (40)	104 (40)	104 (40)	104 (40)	99 (37)	85 (29)	80 (27)	104 (40)
Mean maximum °F (°C)	70.6 (21.4)	73.6 (23.1)	81.6 (27.6)	85.9 (29.9)	90.4 (32.4)	94.7 (34.8)	97.0 (36.1)	96.1 (35.6)	92.0 (33.3)	85.6 (29.8)	77.8 (25.4)	71.2 (21.8)	98.0 (36.7)
Mean daily maximum °F (°C)	52.3 (11.3)	56.6 (13.7)	64.2 (17.9)	73.2 (22.9)	80.1 (26.7)	86.9 (30.5)	90.3 (32.4)	88.6 (31.4)	82.8 (28.2)	73.3 (22.9)	62.9 (17.2)	54.9 (12.7)	72.2 (22.3)
Daily mean °F (°C)	42.1 (5.6)	45.7 (7.6)	52.7 (11.5)	61.1 (16.2)	69.0 (20.6)	76.6 (24.8)	80.1 (26.7)	78.6 (25.9)	72.7 (22.6)	61.9 (16.6)	51.4 (10.8)	44.7 (7.1)	61.4 (16.3)
Mean daily minimum °F (°C)	31.8 (−0.1)	34.9 (1.6)	41.2 (5.1)	49.1 (9.5)	58.0 (14.4)	66.2 (19.0)	69.9 (21.1)	68.7 (20.4)	62.6 (17.0)	50.4 (10.2)	39.8 (4.3)	34.5 (1.4)	50.6 (10.3)
Mean minimum °F (°C)	14.8 (−9.6)	19.3 (−7.1)	23.7 (−4.6)	32.9 (0.5)	43.3 (6.3)	55.5 (13.1)	62.2 (16.8)	60.0 (15.6)	49.8 (9.9)	33.9 (1.1)	23.8 (−4.6)	19.6 (−6.9)	12.6 (−10.8)
Record low °F (°C)	−5 (−21)	−5 (−21)	4 (−16)	21 (−6)	32 (0)	45 (7)	53 (12)	50 (10)	38 (3)	24 (−4)	11 (−12)	−5 (−21)	−5 (−21)
Average precipitation inches (mm)	3.49 (89)	3.13 (80)	3.95 (100)	3.84 (98)	3.36 (85)	3.99 (101)	3.74 (95)	4.35 (110)	3.71 (94)	3.16 (80)	3.31 (84)	3.57 (91)	43.60 (1,107)
Average snowfall inches (cm)	1.6 (4.1)	1.1 (2.8)	0.3 (0.76)	0.0 (0.0)	0.0 (0.0)	0.0 (0.0)	0.0 (0.0)	0.0 (0.0)	0.0 (0.0)	0.0 (0.0)	0.1 (0.25)	0.4 (1.0)	3.5 (8.9)
Average precipitation days (≥ 0.01 in)	10.3	9.7	10.2	9.0	9.5	10.6	10.5	10.1	7.7	7.1	8.1	9.6	112.4
Average snowy days (≥ 0.1 in)	0.9	0.5	0.2	0.0	0.0	0.0	0.0	0.0	0.0	0.0	0.0	0.3	1.9
Average relative humidity (%)	65.7	61.8	61.5	59.3	66.9	69.6	72.2	73.5	73.3	69.9	67.6	67.3	67.4
Average dew point °F (°C)	27.3 (−2.6)	28.6 (−1.9)	36.3 (2.4)	43.5 (6.4)	54.9 (12.7)	63.0 (17.2)	67.1 (19.5)	66.7 (19.3)	61.2 (16.2)	49.5 (9.7)	39.6 (4.2)	31.3 (−0.4)	47.4 (8.6)
Mean monthly sunshine hours	173.3	180.3	234.8	269.6	292.1	289.2	290.0	272.9	241.4	230.5	178.4	168.5	2,821
Percentage possible sunshine	55	59	63	69	67	66	66	65	65	66	58	55	63
Average ultraviolet index	3	4	6	8	9	10	10	9	8	5	3	2	6
Source 1: NOAA (relative humidity and sun 1961–1990)
Source 2: Weather Atlas (UV index)

Climate data for Raleigh (Köppen Cfa)
Month	Jan	Feb	Mar	Apr	May	Jun	Jul	Aug	Sep	Oct	Nov	Dec	Year
Record high °F (°C)	80 (27)	84 (29)	94 (34)	95 (35)	99 (37)	105 (41)	105 (41)	105 (41)	104 (40)	100 (38)	88 (31)	81 (27)	105 (41)
Mean maximum °F (°C)	71.9 (22.2)	74.4 (23.6)	81.6 (27.6)	86.4 (30.2)	91.3 (32.9)	96.6 (35.9)	98.2 (36.8)	96.7 (35.9)	92.3 (33.5)	86.7 (30.4)	78.5 (25.8)	72.8 (22.7)	99.6 (37.6)
Mean daily maximum °F (°C)	51.9 (11.1)	55.8 (13.2)	63.3 (17.4)	72.7 (22.6)	80.0 (26.7)	87.4 (30.8)	90.8 (32.7)	88.7 (31.5)	82.5 (28.1)	73.0 (22.8)	63.0 (17.2)	54.7 (12.6)	72.0 (22.2)
Daily mean °F (°C)	41.9 (5.5)	45.0 (7.2)	51.8 (11.0)	60.8 (16.0)	68.8 (20.4)	76.7 (24.8)	80.5 (26.9)	78.8 (26.0)	72.6 (22.6)	61.7 (16.5)	51.5 (10.8)	44.6 (7.0)	61.2 (16.2)
Mean daily minimum °F (°C)	31.8 (−0.1)	34.2 (1.2)	40.3 (4.6)	48.9 (9.4)	57.7 (14.3)	66.0 (18.9)	70.2 (21.2)	68.9 (20.5)	62.7 (17.1)	50.3 (10.2)	40.0 (4.4)	34.4 (1.3)	50.4 (10.2)
Mean minimum °F (°C)	14.0 (−10.0)	19.2 (−7.1)	23.7 (−4.6)	32.2 (0.1)	42.8 (6.0)	54.2 (12.3)	61.0 (16.1)	58.7 (14.8)	48.7 (9.3)	33.2 (0.7)	24.4 (−4.2)	19.9 (−6.7)	12.1 (−11.1)
Record low °F (°C)	−9 (−23)	−2 (−19)	11 (−12)	23 (−5)	29 (−2)	38 (3)	48 (9)	46 (8)	37 (3)	19 (−7)	11 (−12)	0 (−18)	−9 (−23)
Average precipitation inches (mm)	3.43 (87)	2.78 (71)	4.10 (104)	3.53 (90)	3.58 (91)	3.89 (99)	5.02 (128)	4.71 (120)	5.15 (131)	3.37 (86)	3.32 (84)	3.39 (86)	46.07 (1,170)
Average snowfall inches (cm)	2.6 (6.6)	1.4 (3.6)	0.3 (0.76)	0.0 (0.0)	0.0 (0.0)	0.0 (0.0)	0.0 (0.0)	0.0 (0.0)	0.0 (0.0)	0.0 (0.0)	0.1 (0.25)	0.8 (2.0)	5.2 (13)
Average precipitation days (≥ 0.01 in)	10.1	9.3	10.7	9.5	9.9	11.2	11.7	10.7	9.0	7.6	8.2	9.7	117.6
Average snowy days (≥ 0.1 in)	1.2	1.2	0.4	0.0	0.0	0.0	0.0	0.0	0.0	0.0	0.1	0.5	3.4
Average relative humidity (%)	66.5	64.1	63.0	61.7	71.1	73.6	76.0	77.9	77.1	73.3	69.1	68.5	70.2
Average dew point °F (°C)	26.8 (−2.9)	28.2 (−2.1)	35.8 (2.1)	43.3 (6.3)	55.2 (12.9)	63.5 (17.5)	67.8 (19.9)	67.5 (19.7)	61.5 (16.4)	49.3 (9.6)	39.4 (4.1)	31.1 (−0.5)	47.5 (8.6)
Mean monthly sunshine hours	163.8	173.1	228.9	250.7	258.4	267.7	259.5	239.6	217.6	215.4	174.0	157.6	2,606.3
Percentage possible sunshine	53	57	62	64	59	61	58	57	58	62	56	52	59
Average ultraviolet index	3	4	6	7	9	10	10	9	8	5	3	2	6
Source 1: NOAA (relative humidity, dew point, and sun 1961–1990)
Source 2: Weather Atlas (UV Index)

== See also ==
- Climate
- Climate change
- Climate change in North Carolina
- Climatology
- List of North Carolina hurricanes
- List of North Carolina weather records
- List of wettest known tropical cyclones in North Carolina
- Meteorology
