= Hurricane Dennis (1999) =

Category 2 Atlantic hurricane in 1999

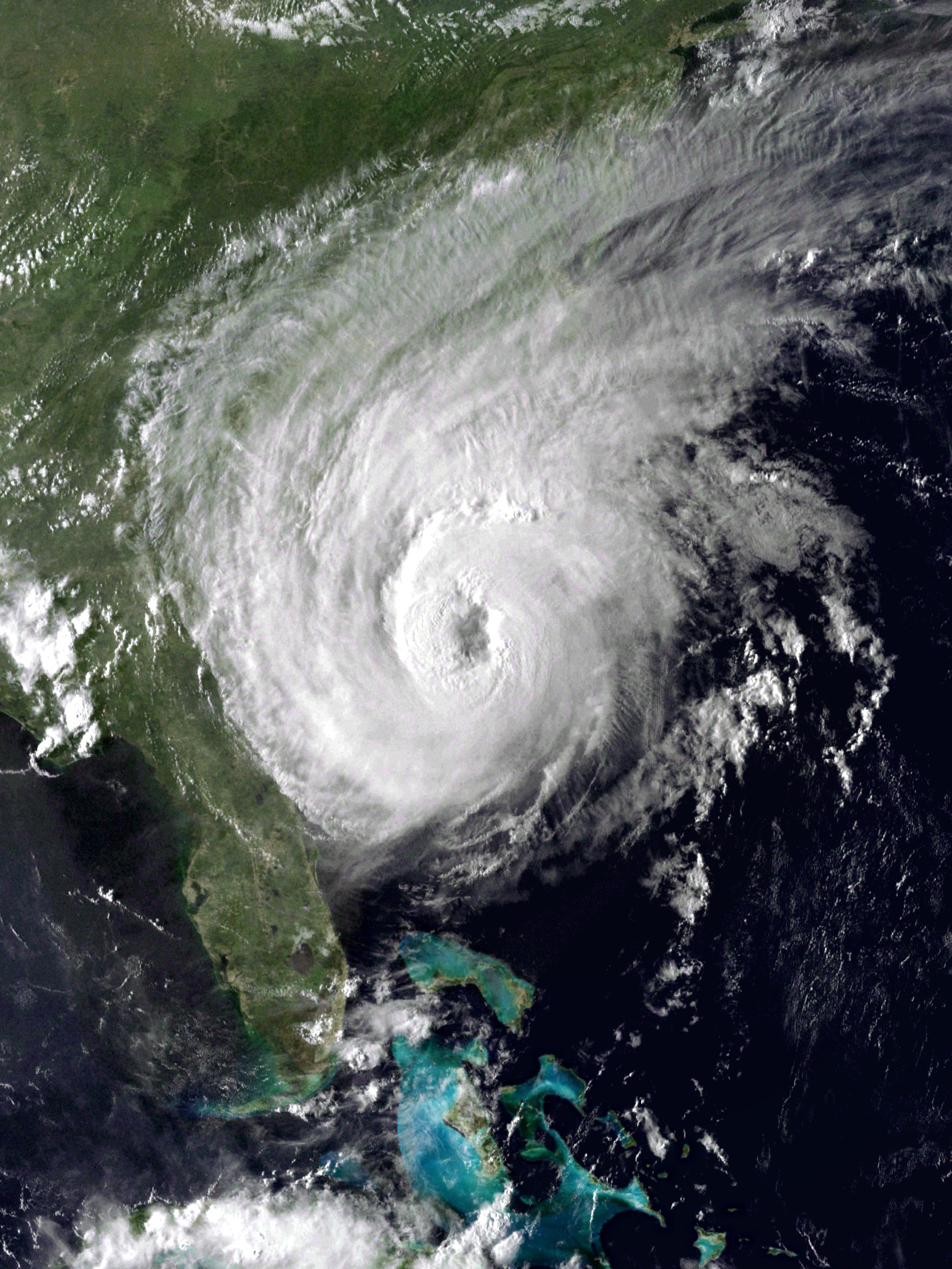
- Dennis near peak intensity off the coast of South Carolina on August 29

Meteorological history
- Formed: August 24, 1999
- Extratropical: September 7, 1999
- Dissipated: September 9, 1999

Category 2 hurricane
- 1-minute sustained (SSHWS/NWS)
- Highest winds: 105 mph (165 km/h)
- Lowest pressure: 962 mbar (hPa); 28.41 inHg

Overall effects
- Fatalities: 6 (4 direct, 2 indirect)
- Damage: $157 million (1999 USD)
- Areas affected: The Bahamas, Florida, Georgia, North Carolina, Virginia, Mid-Atlantic, New England, Ontario, Quebec
- IBTrACS
- Part of the 1999 Atlantic hurricane season

Hurricane Dennis caused flooding in North Carolina and the Mid-Atlantic states in early September 1999, which would later be compounded by Hurricane Floyd. The fifth tropical cyclone of the season, Dennis developed from a tropical wave to the north of Puerto Rico on August 24. Originally a tropical depression, the system moved west-northwestward and strengthened into a tropical storm despite unfavorable wind shear. The storm became a hurricane by August 26. After striking the Abaco Islands, conditions improved, allowing for Dennis to strengthen into a Category 2 on the Saffir–Simpson scale by August 28. Around this time, Dennis began to move parallel to the Southeastern United States. Early on August 30, the storm peaked with winds of 105 mph (165 km/h). By the following day, steering currents collapsed and the storm interacted with a cold front, causing Dennis to move erratically offshore North Carolina. Wind shear and cold air associated with the front weakened Dennis to a tropical storm on September 1 and removed some of its tropical characteristics. Eventually, warmer ocean temperatures caused some re-strengthening. By September 4, Dennis turned northwestward and made landfall in Cape Lookout, North Carolina, as a strong tropical storm. The storm slowly weakened inland, before transitioning into an extratropical cyclone over western New York on September 7.

In the Bahamas, Dennis produced moderate winds, rain, and storm surge on San Salvador, Crooked Island, Eleuthera, and Abaco Islands, resulting in damage to roofs and coastal properties. Dennis brought 6–8 ft (1.8–2.4 m) waves to the east coast of Florida, causing minor erosion and four drowning deaths. The waves left severe erosion and coastal flooding along the Outer Banks of North Carolina. An 8 ft (2.4 m) deep channel created along Highway 12 isolated three towns on Hatteras Island. In Carteret, Craven, and Dare counties, the storm damaged at least 2,025 homes and businesses to some degree. Heavy rainfall produced by the storm in eastern North Carolina was generally beneficial due to drought conditions, but some crops were damaged. Two indirect deaths occurred in Richlands during a weather-related car accident. Similar inland flooding occurred in northern and eastern Virginia. A tornado in Hampton severely damaged five apartment complexes, three of which were condemned completely, as well an assisted living facility; about 460 people were forced to evacuate from the buildings, and as many as 800 vehicles may have been damaged. Overall, damage in North Carolina and Virginia totaled about $157 million. (Note: All damage figures are in 1999 USD, unless otherwise noted) Generally minor flooding occurred in the Mid-Atlantic and New England.

== Meteorological history ==
Map plotting the storm's track and intensity, according to the Saffir–Simpson scale Map key Saffir–Simpson scale Tropical depression (≤38 mph, ≤62 km/h) Tropical storm (39–73 mph, 63–118 km/h) Category 1 (74–95 mph, 119–153 km/h) Category 2 (96–110 mph, 154–177 km/h) Category 3 (111–129 mph, 178–208 km/h) Category 4 (130–156 mph, 209–251 km/h) Category 5 (≥157 mph, ≥252 km/h) Unknown Storm type Tropical cyclone Subtropical cyclone Extratropical cyclone, remnant low, tropical disturbance, or monsoon depression

A tropical wave emerged into the Atlantic from the west coast of Africa on August 17. Tracking steadily westward, the wave remained devoid of significant convection until August 21, when associated shower and thunderstorm activity increased a few hundred miles northeast of the Leeward Islands. Over the course of the next two days, the development of a low-level circulation was noted, though a reconnaissance aircraft failed to locate the presence of a surface low-pressure area on August 23. Subsequent surface observations indicated the formation of a circulation at the surface, and the wave acquired enough organization to be designated as a tropical depression at 00:00 UTC on August 24, while centered 220 mi (355 km) east of Turks Island. Data from a secondary reconnaissance aircraft and ship reports indicated intensification, and the depression was upgraded to Tropical Storm Dennis at 12:00 UTC that same day accordingly. Located at the tail-end of a stationary trough and in an environment of unfavorable wind shear, the system was ill-defined and asymmetric. Despite the unfavorable environment, data from the Hurricane Hunters indicated that Dennis had intensified into a Category 1 hurricane by 06:00 UTC on August 26.

Tracking west-northwestward in advance of a trough over the eastern United States, the system did not resemble a typical hurricane on satellite imagery, with a low-level center outside of the deepest convection. The system turned towards the northwest and simultaneously slowed in motion by August 27 as a second mid-latitude trough passed to its north. Though wind shear remained unfavorable initially, it began to lessen on August 28 as an anticyclone developed aloft. At 12:00 UTC, Dennis was upgraded to a Category 2 hurricane on the Saffir–Simpson scale and reached peak winds of 105 mph (165 km/h), though its lowest barometric pressure was recorded until 06:00 UTC on August 30. Despite this intensity, the hurricane's eye was large, up to 30-40 mi (50–65 km) wide, and several fixes from the Hurricane Hunters did not indicate the presence of one at all. The system also became unusually large, with its radius of maximum sustained winds extending up to 70-85 mi (110–130 km) wide. Following peak intensity, Dennis accelerated towards the northeastward in response to the secondary trough, barely missing the Outer Banks. By August 31, steering currents collapsed and the hurricane began to aimlessly drift east of Cape Hatteras, North Carolina.

Though the upper-level trough advanced eastward away from the hurricane, a trailing cold front became intertwined with Dennis, forcing dry air into the circulation in addition to creating a hostile upper-level environment. On September 1, the system weakened below hurricane intensity, with the National Hurricane Center (NHC) noting that the storm could be as much an extratropical as a subtropical or tropical cyclone. Thereafter, a building ridge over the eastern United States forced the storm southward across slightly warmer ocean temperatures. As a result, banding features became better defined despite low convective tops as viewed on radar and in satellite imagery. On September 3, the high drifted eastward into the Atlantic, forcing Dennis to turn northwestward. A formative eyewall was observed on September 4, and Dennis reached a secondary peak intensity with winds of 70 mph (110 km/h) by 18:00 UTC. Three hours later, the system moved ashore the Cape Lookout National Seashore in eastern North Carolina at this intensity. Continuing inland, Dennis weakened to a tropical depression over central North Carolina at 12:00 UTC on September 5. The cyclone drifted erratically even overland, turning northeast and eventually north before dissipating over New York at 18:00 UTC on September 7. Two days later, the low was absorbed into a larger cyclone.

== Preparations ==
The erratic motion of Dennis resulted in the issues of several tropical cyclone warnings and watches. Alerts from this hurricane were issued starting on August 24, at which time a tropical storm warning was put it place for the southeast Bahamas and Turks and Caicos Islands, simultaneously, a tropical storm watch was also issued for the central Bahamas. Less than 24 hours, the tropical storm watch was upgraded to a tropical storm warning, while there was also an additional hurricane watch. All watches and warnings within the Bahamas were discontinued by late August 28.

Watches and warnings in the United States began on August 27, with a hurricane watch being issued from Sebastian Inlet to Fernandina Beach in Florida. A tropical storm warning was also issued for much of the same area several hours later. As Dennis began turning northward, the threat of the storm striking Florida lessened, which resulted in discontinuations of the watches and warnings. Watches and warnings were issued from South Carolina to Virginia, beginning with a hurricane watch from north of Savannah, Georgia, to Surf City, North Carolina. The watches and warnings were adjusted in accordance to the storm's changes in intensity and erratic movement. In South Carolina, officials opened about 13 shelters in the Charleston area, but just 40 people sought refuge in them. Governor Jim Hodges did not order evacuations, but encouraged residents in coastal areas to remain vigilant.

As Dennis made its initial approach to North Carolina, state officials urged nearly 150,000 coastal residents to prepare for the storm. Local officials ordered the evacuation of tourists and approximately 22,000 residents on Hatteras and Ocracoke islands. New Hanover County closed its courts, offices, and schools on August 30. The American Red Cross opened two emergency shelters in Wilmington. Airplanes at Seymour Johnson Air Force Base in Goldsboro were flown to Ohio.

== Impact ==
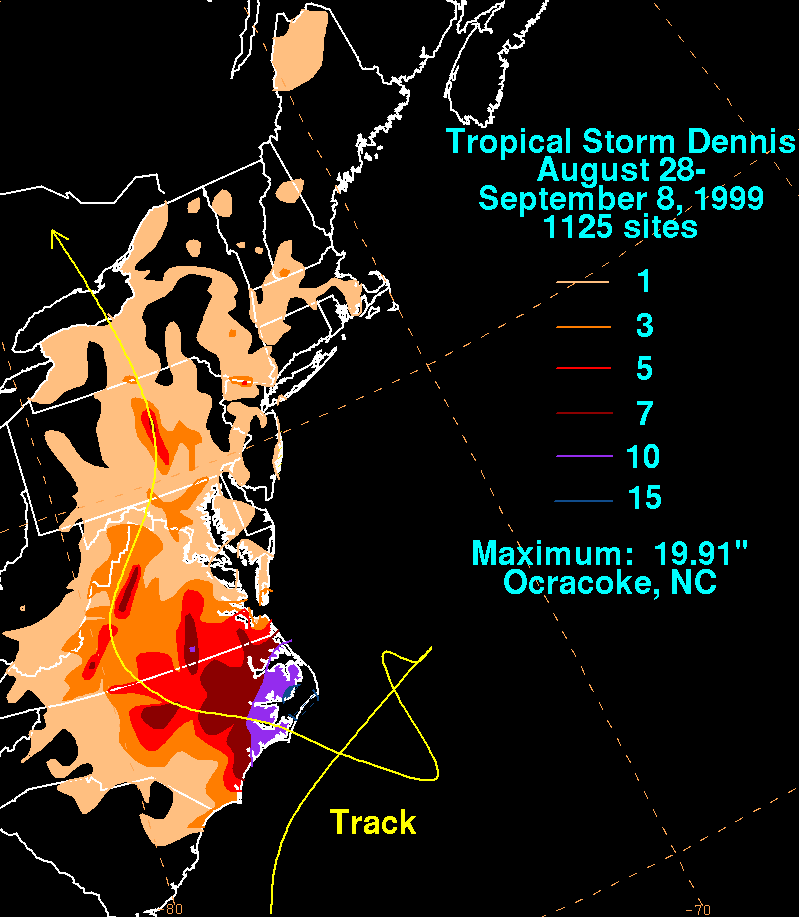
Rainfall from Dennis

Dennis left $157 million in damage and six deaths, with four in Florida due to drowning in high surf and two in North Carolina as a result of a weather-related car accident. In North Carolina and Virginia, insurance claims for damaged property totaled $60 million. Agricultural losses in the two states reached about $37 million. The heavy rain from Dennis staged a catastrophic flood disaster wrought by Hurricane Floyd about two weeks later.

=== Bahamas ===
Dennis brought tropical storm and hurricane-force winds to the Bahamas. In Grand Bahama, a weather station reported winds of 40 mph (64 km/h) while other areas reported winds between 70 and 75 mph (113 and 121 km/h). A 976 mbar (28.8 inHg) reading and storm tides 1–3 ft (0.30–0.91 m) above normal occurred as the center of the storm moved across Abaco Island on August 28. The only official rainfall total from the Bahamas was 4.4 in (110 mm) at Eleuthera and Abaco. Dennis caused moderate damage across the Bahamas. On Abaco Island, the rain caused heavy flooding and storm surge washed out roads. Dennis also caused considerable damage to trees and boats. Widespread power outages were also reported. However, there were no reports of deaths or injuries and damage totals from the Bahamas are unavailable.

=== Southeastern United States ===
In Florida, Dennis caused minor beach erosion as far south as Broward and Palm Beach counties. Storm tides swamped six boats in Boca Raton and the Hillsboro Inlet. While located offshore, the storm brought winds up to 35 mph (56 km/h) with gusts reaching 40 mph (64 km/h) in Jacksonville, while a weather station in St. Augustine reported a 35 mph (56 km/h) gust. Dennis dropped very light rainfall in Florida, amounting to only 0.11 in (2.8 mm) at Jacksonville International Airport. The hurricane also brought storm tides between 6–8 ft (1.8–2.4 m) above normal in some areas, though only minor beach erosion occurred. Overall, rip currents generated by Dennis resulted in four fatalities, with one in St. Johns County.

The state of Georgia reported 35 mph (56 km/h) wind gusts and only a trace of rain. In South Carolina, numerous weather stations reported winds between 40–55 mph (64–89 km/h) and gusts reaching hurricane force. Rainfall up to 1.2 in (30 mm) fell in some areas while buoys offshore reported tides 2 ft (0.61 m) above normal. Minor to moderate beach erosion was reported from Charleston to Colleton County. Damage in South Carolina was limited to downed trees and scattered power outages.

=== North Carolina ===
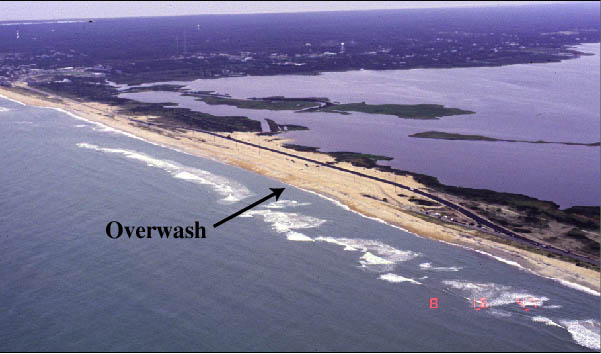
The storm surge from Dennis damaged a section of Highway 12 in North Carolina.

Dennis brought tropical storm-force winds with gusts up to hurricane-force to the North Carolina coast. In Oregon Inlet, there were 60 mph (97 km/h) winds, while Cape Hatteras and Wrightsville Beach reported gusts between 90–100 mph (140–160 km/h). A weather station reported 90 mph (140 km/h) wind gusts and a barometric pressure reading of 977 mbar (28.9 inHg). When Dennis made landfall on September 4, it brought tropical storm-force winds to much of eastern North Carolina, including 45 mph (72 km/h) winds at Cherry Point. Storm tides 3–5 ft (0.91–1.52 m) above normal were reported along the North Carolina coast. Because Dennis was a slow moving storm, it produced heavy rains across eastern North Carolina. Precipitation peaked at 19.91 in (506 mm) in Ocracoke, while rainfall between 3–10 in (76–254 mm) fell elsewhere in the eastern parts of the state.

The heavy rains knocked down power lines near Wilmington, leaving 56,000 residents without electricity. In Brunswick County, a beachfront home collapsed in Ocean Isle Beach. New Hanover County experienced about $217,000 in losses. Two indirect deaths occurred in North Carolina due to a weather-related car accident in Richlands.

Storm surge left three towns on Hatteras Island isolated from the rest of the state as an 8 ft (2.4 m) deep channel was created on North Carolina Highway 12. Additionally, storm surge cut-off the route between Avon and Buxton and left 4 ft (1.2 m) of sand lying upon portions of Highway 12. In Carteret, Craven, and Dare counties, the storm damaged at least 2,025 homes and businesses to some degree. The storm brought major damage to 75 homes and minor damage to 230 others in Carteret County. Tides along the Neuse River ranged from 8 to 10 ft (2.4 to 3.0 m) above normal, flooding homes near Adams, Clubfoot, and Harlowe creeks, including between 100 and 150 dwellings in Harlowe. The county also suffered agricultural losses, totaling about $3.5 million. A total of 120 dwellings in Craven County experienced substantial damage.

In Pamlico County, about 150 people were forced to seek shelter due to flooding. The swollen Pamlico River left the community of Lowland isolated. Crop damage in the county totaled about $8 million, while damage to the seafood processing industry reached approximately $3 million. Dare County suffered the most damage. Dennis inflicted some degree of damage on 1,600 businesses and homes, of which about 5 percent of those structures were destroyed or left uninhabitable (at least 86), while approximately 20 percent experienced major damage and roughly 75 percent suffered minor damage. Storm surge swept away six homes in Rodanthe. Property damage reached roughly $12 million in Dare County, while losses to dunes in Nags Head totaled approximately $16.5 million. In Beaufort County, storm surge reaching nearly 6 ft (1.8 m) in height flooded portions of the town of Belhaven, including its downtown section.

Coastal flooding also occurred near the northeastern corner of the state. Storm surge ranging from 2–3 ft (0.61–0.91 m) occurred along Albemarle Sound in Camden, Chowan, and Pasquotank counties, flooding areas near the sound. In Camden County, a number of roads and the fire department were inundated. With the Coast Guard station in Elizabeth City recorded a sustained wind speed of 39 mph (63 km/h) and a wind gust of 52 mph (84 km/h), a few trees fell and scattered power outages were reported in northeastern North Carolina. The region experienced 5 to 7 in (130 to 180 mm) of precipitation, flooding some streets. The rain was generally beneficial as it broke a prolonged dry spell, but it also staged the catastrophic flood disaster caused by Hurricane Floyd a month later. Agricultural damage throughout North Carolina totaled at least $14 million. A combination of rainfall and winds damaged more than 268,000 acres (108,000 ha) of crops, particularly corn, cotton, peanuts, soybeans, and tobacco.

=== Virginia and Mid-Atlantic ===
Along the coast of Virginia, tides peaked at approximately 3.0 ft (0.91 m) above normal, equivalent to 6 ft (1.8 m) mean lower low water, at Sewell's Point in Norfolk. Moderate coastal flooding occurred during high tide. Rainfall amounts generally ranged from 2 to 5 in (51 to 127 mm), though Lawrenceville observed 10.21 in (259 mm) of precipitation. The strongest sustained wind speed observed in the state was 52 mph (84 km/h) at Langley Air Force Base, with the same location reporting the highest wind gust of 76 mph (122 km/h). The storm spawned an F2 tornado in Hampton. Traveling for approximately 1 mi (1.6 km), the tornado rendered three apartment complexes and an assisted living facility uninhabitable, while two other apartment complexes were partly condemned. Approximately 460 people were forced to evacuate, with 300 from the apartment complexes and 160 from the assisted living facility. Several buildings were deroofed. The tornado damaged as many as 800 vehicles and overturned an 18-wheel tractor trailer. Approximately 6,600 people lost electricity due to the twister. The tornado injured 15 people and caused about $7 million in damage. In northwestern Virginia, rainfall caused the ground to become saturated enough that many trees and power lines fell. Almost 11,000 customers lost electricity in Albemarle County and Charlottesville.

The remnants of Dennis tracked across Maryland between September 4 and September 6, producing heavy rainfall in central portions of the state and tidal flooding along the western shoreline of the Chesapeake Bay. Rainfall totals include 5.59 in (142 mm) at Clarksburg, 4.50 in (114 mm) at Glenmont, and 4.41 in (112 mm) at Gaithersburg. Winds in the state gusted to 35 mph (56 km/h), causing downed tree limbs and scattered power outages. Associated lightning in Allegany County struck two main power poles. The incident forced the closure of Interstate 68 and left 4,700 customers without power. Tides generally ran 2 to 3 ft (0.61 to 0.91 m) above normal along the coast; coastal flooding was reported at several locations. Two days of heavy rain swelled Jones Falls Creek, which swept away a 13-year-old boy. After an hour, he was rescued from a pile of debris and treated for hypothermia. Street flooding of up to 2 ft (0.61 m) in depth was reported. In Baltimore, persistent winds pushed water over a seawall at Inner Harbor.

Rainfall in Pennsylvania reached 7.29 in (185 mm) at Lewisburg. Within the city, flooding forced the evacuation of at least 160 people, many of them students at Bucknell University. The school itself suffered damage. A total of 414 homes and businesses were damaged, as were 162 cars, which floated down the streets. In Snyder County, trailers at a campground near Kratzerville were swept away. Approximately 30 people at the campground were forced to seek higher ground, as were campers in Kreamer. U.S. Route 15 – a major highway to the state capitol of Harrisburg – was closed in both Union and Snyder counties. In Lycoming County, 4 to 8 in (100 to 200 mm) of precipitation was reported. The heavy rainfall triggered flash flooding that was compared to that of Hurricane Agnes in 1972. Montgomery was particularly hard hit, where 30 houses were damaged and 80 residents were evacuated. An entire neighborhood in Swatara Township evacuated when flood waters reached depths of 8 ft (2.4 m). In Northumberland County, flooding resulted in 12 persons being rescued from their homes. Approximately 75 homes suffered flood damage. Throughout the northern part of the county, damage totaled approximately $800,000. Across the region, basements and roads were flooded. In addition, mudslides closed two highways north of Liverpool.

Periods of heavy rain, street flooding, wind gusts of up to 35 mph (56 km/h), and tidal flooding along the Potomac River were also reported in Washington, D.C. The Washington Reagan National Airport recorded 2.31 in (59 mm) of rain. The winds resulted in isolated power outages throughout the District. To protect the Washington Harbor, officials erected a flood wall along the Potomac River. The storm also dropped light rainfall in parts of Delaware. A strong high pressure system developed over eastern Canada and New England. Combined with swells from Hurricane Dennis, beach erosion, rough surf, and minor tidal flooding battered the coasts of Delaware and New Jersey. In the former, tides peaked at 6.6 ft (2.0 m) above mean lower low water at Lewes. Water reached the bulkheads at Bethany Beach and inundated Pennsylvania Avenue, a road which is frequently flooded. Lifeguards rescued about 100 people. In New Jersey, tides ranged as high as 7.1 ft (2.2 m) above mean lower low water level along the coast, and street flooding was reported onshore. The beach at Cape Map Point lost approximately 1 ft (0.30 m) of sand to the erosion. Tides washed away about 100,000 cu yd (76,000 m^{3}) of sand at Avalon, causing about $700,000 in damage.

As a result of the rough surf, swimming restrictions were set as far north as Long Island. A narrow band of rainfall produced precipitation rates of over 2 in (51 mm) per hour in some areas across southeastern New York, which resulted in significant street flooding. The heaviest precipitation fell on the higher terrain of southeast Orange County and northwest Rockland County. On some roads, flood waters accumulated to 3 ft (0.91 m) deep; this led to stalled vehicles. Several basements were flooded in the region. In New York City, a period of hot weather, followed by heavy rainfall from the remnants of Dennis, contributed to the formation of a swarm of disease-carrying mosquitoes. Moderate rainfall extended into New England, where in excess of 3 in (76 mm) of precipitation was recorded.

== Aftermath ==
President Bill Clinton approved an emergency declaration for assistance for North Carolina on September 1, as the storm was still offshore. The declaration allowed local governments in Beaufort, Brunswick, Carteret, Craven, Currituck, Dare, Hyde, New Hanover, Onslow, Pamlico, and Pender counties to receive monetary assistance from the federal government. Prior to repairs to Highway 12, about 5,700 people on Hatteras and Ocracoke islands, who ignored evacuation orders, were left stranded. Initially, relief supplies had to be delivered by helicopter or by National Guard during low tide. On September 6, North Carolina governor Jim Hunt, North Carolina Department of Crime Control and Public Safety secretary Richard H. Moore, and President pro tempore of the North Carolina Senate Marc Basnight visited the hardest hit areas of the Outer Banks. As a result of the visit, Governor Hunt requested a second declaration – a disaster declaration. President Clinton approved a disaster declaration on September 9 for Beaufort, Carteret, Craven, Dare, Hyde, and Pamlico counties in North Carolina.

Within hours of the tornado in Hampton, Virginia, school buses evacuated hundreds of residents of the assisted living facility and apartment complexes to Red Cross shelters. The independent city received approval for a disaster declaration on September 5 due to Dennis and its tornadoes. In Pennsylvania, Dauphin, Lycoming, Northumberland, Snyder, and Union counties also received a disaster declaration on September 22 due to flash flooding associated with Dennis. Heavy rainfall generated by the storm in North Carolina and Virginia eased a drought in both states, but elevated waterways, setting the stage for disastrous flooding that would occur about two weeks later during Hurricane Floyd.

== See also ==
- Other storms of the same name
- List of Florida hurricanes
- List of North Carolina hurricanes
- List of New Jersey hurricanes
- Timeline of the 1999 Atlantic hurricane season
