= List of storms named Don =

The name Don has been used for three tropical cyclones in the Atlantic Ocean. It replaced the name Dennis, which was retired after the 2005 season.

- Tropical Storm Don (2011) – weak tropical storm that made landfall on southern Texas
- Tropical Storm Don (2017) – short-lived tropical storm that dissipated before reaching the Windward Islands
- Hurricane Don (2023) – a Category 1 hurricane that remained in the open ocean
