= Dennis, Georgia =

Dennis, Georgia may refer to:

- Dennis, Murray County, Georgia, United States
- Dennis, Putnam County, Georgia, United States
