= List of North Carolina weather records =

The following is a list of North Carolina weather records. North Carolina is located in the Southeastern United States. With the Appalachian Mountains in the western portions of the state, the Piedmont stretching nearly 300 miles across the central portions of the state, and the Coastal Plains and Atlantic Ocean in the eastern portions of the state, North Carolina has experienced many different weather conditions.

== Temperature ==
=== Overall ===
Event	Measurement	Date	Location
Highest temperature	110 °F (43 °C)	August 21, 1983	Fayetteville
Lowest temperature	−34 °F (−37 °C)	January 21, 1985	Mount Mitchell

== Precipitation ==
Event	Measurement	Date	Location
Most precipitation in a year for a single area	139.94 inches (355 cm)	2018	Mount Mitchell
Least precipitation in a year for a single area	22.69 inches (58 cm)	1930	Mount Airy

=== Rain ===
Event	Measurement	Date	Location
Greatest 24-hour rainfall	35 inches (889 mm)	September 15, 2018	Sampson County

=== Snow ===
Event	Measurement	Date	Location
Greatest 24-hour snowfall	36 inches (91 cm)	March 13, 1993	Mount Mitchell
Most snow from a single winter storm	60 inches (152 cm)	April 2–6, 1987	Newfound Gap, Swain County, Great Smoky Mountains National Park
Latest confirmed snowfall (Aug 1 - Jul 31)	Trace	May 30, 1984	Grandfather Mountain

=== Hurricanes ===
Event	Measurement	Date	Location	Ref
Wettest tropical cyclone	30.58 inches (777 mm)	Florence (2018)	Swansboro	

== See also ==
- Climate of North Carolina
- List of weather records
