= Ruben Rafkin =

Finnish ice hockey player

- Born: 8 January 2002 (age 24) Turku, Finland
- Height: 5 ft 11 in (180 cm)
- Weight: 190 lb (86 kg; 13 st 8 lb)
- Position: Defense
- Shoots: Right
- Liiga team Former teams: HC TPS; Tappara; Örebro HK
- NHL draft: Undrafted
- Playing career: 2020–present

Ruben Rafkin (born 8 January 2002) is a Finnish professional ice hockey defenceman for HC TPS of the Liiga.

== Playing career ==
Rafkin was drafted 14th overall by the Windsor Spitfires in the 2019 CHL Import Draft. He recorded four goals and 27 assists in 59 games for the Spitfires. On April 3, 2020, Rafkin signed a two-year contract with HC TPS of the Finnish Liiga. He made his professional debut for TPS during the 2020–21 season.

During the 2024–25 season, Rafkin transferred from the Liiga following 33 appearances with Tappara to the Swedish Hockey League (SHL) in joining Örebro HK on 6 February 2025. He played out the season, notching 2 assists through 12 games.

On 21 May 2025, Rafkin returned to his original club, HC TPS of the Liiga, agreeing to a one-year contract for the 2025–26 season.

== International play ==
Medal record

Ice hockey

Representing Finland

World Junior Championships
Silver medal – second place	2022 Canada	
Bronze medal – third place	2021 Canada	

Rafkin represented Finland at the 2021 World Junior Ice Hockey Championships where he appeared in one game and won a bronze medal. He will again represent Finland at the 2022 World Junior Ice Hockey Championships.

== Personal life ==
Rafkin is of Finnish and Russian-Jewish descent. His paternal great-grandfather had moved from Russia to Vyborg. He is the grandson of Dennis Rafkin, a Finnish businessman and the founder and the owner of Pizzeria Dennis restaurant chain.

== Career statistics ==
=== Regular season and playoffs ===
			Regular season					Playoffs
Season	Team	League	GP	G	A	Pts	PIM	GP	G	A	Pts	PIM
2018–19	Tri-City Storm	USHL	38	2	8	10	90	—	—	—	—	—
2019–20	Windsor Spitfires	OHL	59	4	27	31	61	—	—	—	—	—
2020–21	TPS	Liiga	48	4	12	16	36	13	0	3	3	6
2021–22	TPS	Liiga	52	5	6	11	100	18	0	3	3	10
2022–23	TPS	Liiga	39	0	11	11	22	—	—	—	—	—
2023–24	TPS	Liiga	57	4	21	25	79	9	0	1	1	2
2024–25	Tappara	Liiga	33	1	6	7	28	—	—	—	—	—
2024–25	Örebro HK	SHL	12	0	2	2	10	2	0	0	0	4
Liiga totals			229	14	56	70	265	40	0	7	7	18

=== International ===
Year	T1eam	Event	Result	GP	G	A	Pts	PIM
2018	Finland	U17	2nd place, silver medalist(s)	6	1	1	2	10
2019	Finland	HG18	4th	3	0	1	1	2
2021	Finland	WJC	3rd place, bronze medalist(s)	1	0	0	0	0
2022	Finland	WJC	2nd place, silver medalist(s)	7	0	1	1	8
Junior totals				17	1	3	4	20
