= List of North Carolina hurricanes =

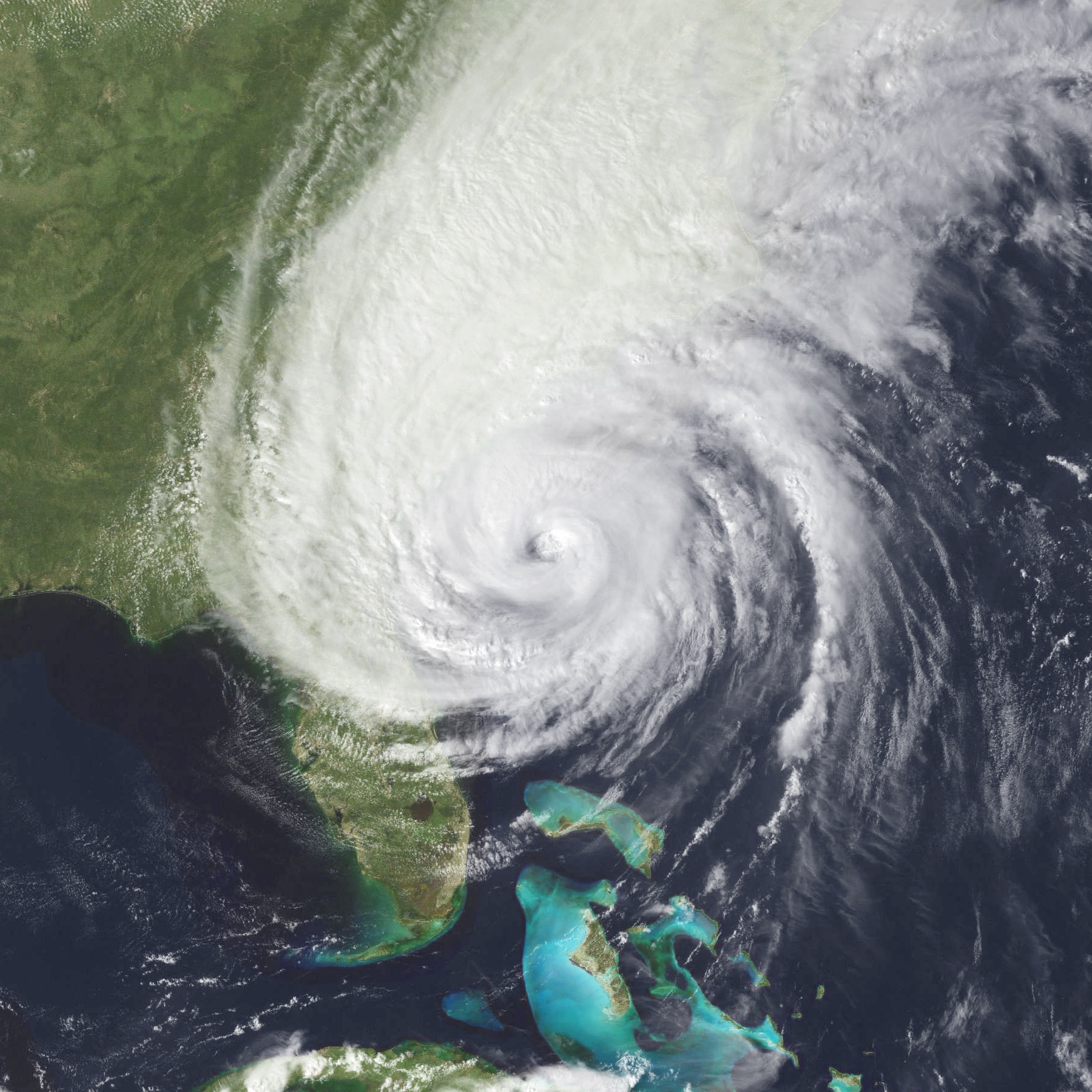
Hurricane Floyd approaching North Carolina, where it would soon make landfall, on September 15, 1999; Floyd later caused the worst modern disaster in the state at that time.

413 known tropical and subtropical cyclones have affected the U.S. state of North Carolina. Due to its location, many hurricanes have hit the state directly, and numerous hurricanes have passed near or through North Carolina in its history; the state is ranked fourth, after Florida, Texas, and Louisiana, in the number of cyclones that produced hurricane-force winds in a U.S. state.

== Climatology ==
As to statistical hurricane research between 1883 and 1996 by the North Carolina State Climatology Office, a tropical cyclone makes landfall along the coastline about once every four years. An estimated 17.5 percent of all North Atlantic tropical cyclones have affected the state. Additionally, the remnants of a few Pacific tropical cyclones struck the state. Cape Hatteras is most affected by storms within the state, though Cape Lookout and Cape Fear are also regularly affected; the increased activity in three areas is because it protrudes from elsewhere along the Atlantic coastline. After Southern Florida, Cape Hatteras has the lowest return period, or the frequency at which a certain intensity or category of hurricane can be expected within 86 mi (139 km) of a given location, in the country. As the Outer Banks are a narrow strip of low-lying land, hurricanes occasionally leave portions of the land partially or fully submerged. Additionally, the remnants of inland tropical cyclones have produced flooding and landslides in the state's western region.

Tropical cyclones have affected North Carolina in every month between May and December; about 35 percent of the storms struck the state in September, and 80 percent affected the state between August and October, which coincides with the peak of the hurricane season. The most recent tropical cyclone to affect North Carolina was Hurricane Debby in August 2024, causing heavy rainfall, significant flooding, and multiple tornadoes across the state. The most recent tropical cyclone to make landfall in North Carolina was Tropical Storm Ophelia, making landfall near Emerald Isle as a high-end tropical storm with sustained winds of 70 mph on September 23, 2023. The strongest storm to strike the state was Hurricane Hazel on October 15, 1954, which made landfall as a Category 4 hurricane on the Saffir–Simpson hurricane scale.

== Pre-1900 ==
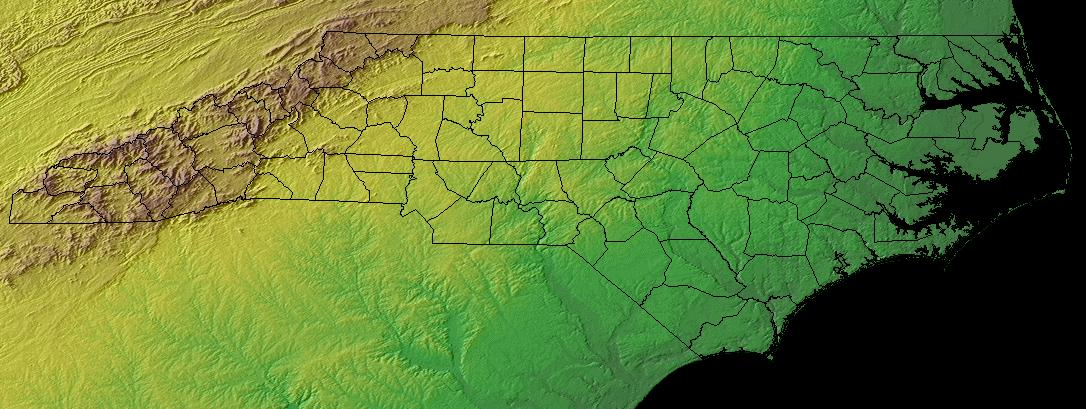
Topographic map of North Carolina

The list of North Carolina hurricanes before 1900 encompasses 139 tropical cyclones that affected the U.S. state of North Carolina. Collectively, cyclones in North Carolina during the time period resulted in over 775 direct fatalities during the period. Seven cyclones affected the state in the 1893 season, which was the year with the most tropical cyclones devastating the state during the time period. From the beginning of the official Atlantic hurricane record in 1851 to 1899, there were 12 years without a known tropical cyclone affecting the state.

Historical data prior to 1700 is sparse due to lack of significant European settlements along the coastline; the few storms listed are largely records from Roanoke Colony and later the Province of Carolina. Modern meteorologists believe early storms were tropical cyclones, though due to the time period confirmation is impossible. One theory explaining the disappearance of Roanoke Colony suggests a hurricane destroyed the village, though there is no evidence to prove the theory. It is considered unlikely due to lack of damage to a fence around the village, on which the villagers left an inscription.

== 1900–1949 ==
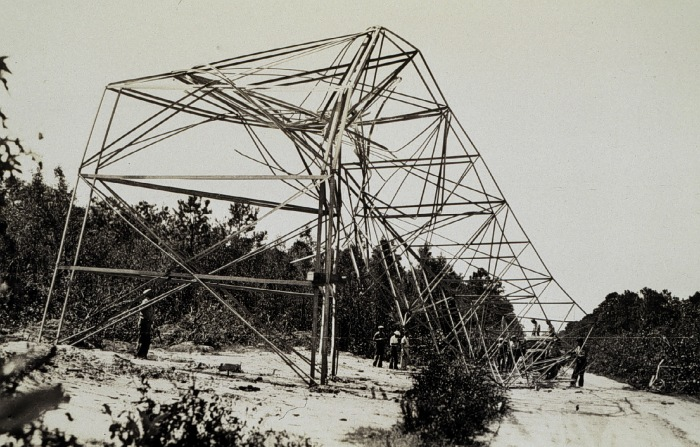
Damage from 1933 Outer Banks hurricane

Between 1900 and 1949, 75 tropical cyclones or their remnants affected the state. Collectively, cyclones in North Carolina during that time period resulted in 53 total fatalities during the period, as well as about $393 million in damage (2020 USD). Tropical cyclone affected the state in all but nine seasons. In the 1916 season, five storms affected the state, which was the season with the most storms devastating the state. The strongest hurricanes to affect the state during the time period were the 1933 Outer Banks hurricane and the 1944 Great Atlantic Hurricane, which produced winds of Category 3 status on the Saffir–Simpson hurricane scale within the state. The 1933 Outer Banks hurricane was the deadliest hurricane in the state during the time period, which killed 21 people. The remnants of a hurricane in 1940 dropped heavy rainfall in the state, which caused over $180 million in damage (2020 USD) from flooding and landslides.

== 1950–1979 ==
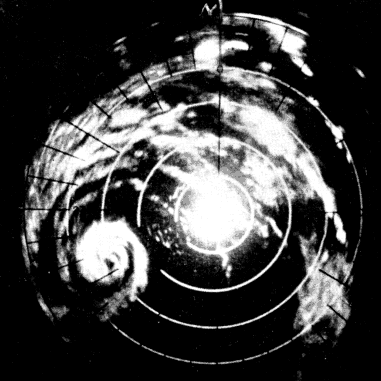
Radar image of Hurricane Connie near North Carolina

A total of 79 tropical or subtropical cyclones affected North Carolina between 1950 and 1979. Collectively, cyclones during the time period resulted in 37 total fatalities during the period, as well as about $4 billion in damage (2020 USD). A cyclone affected the state in every year during the time period, and in three seasons a total of five cyclones assailed the state. The strongest hurricane to hit the state during the time period was Hurricane Hazel, which struck the state as a Category 4 hurricane on the Saffir–Simpson hurricane scale. Hazel was both the costliest and deadliest cyclone during the period, causing over $1 billion in damage (2020 USD) and 19 deaths. Most storms affected the state in September, though cyclones lashed the state between May and October.

== 1980–Present ==
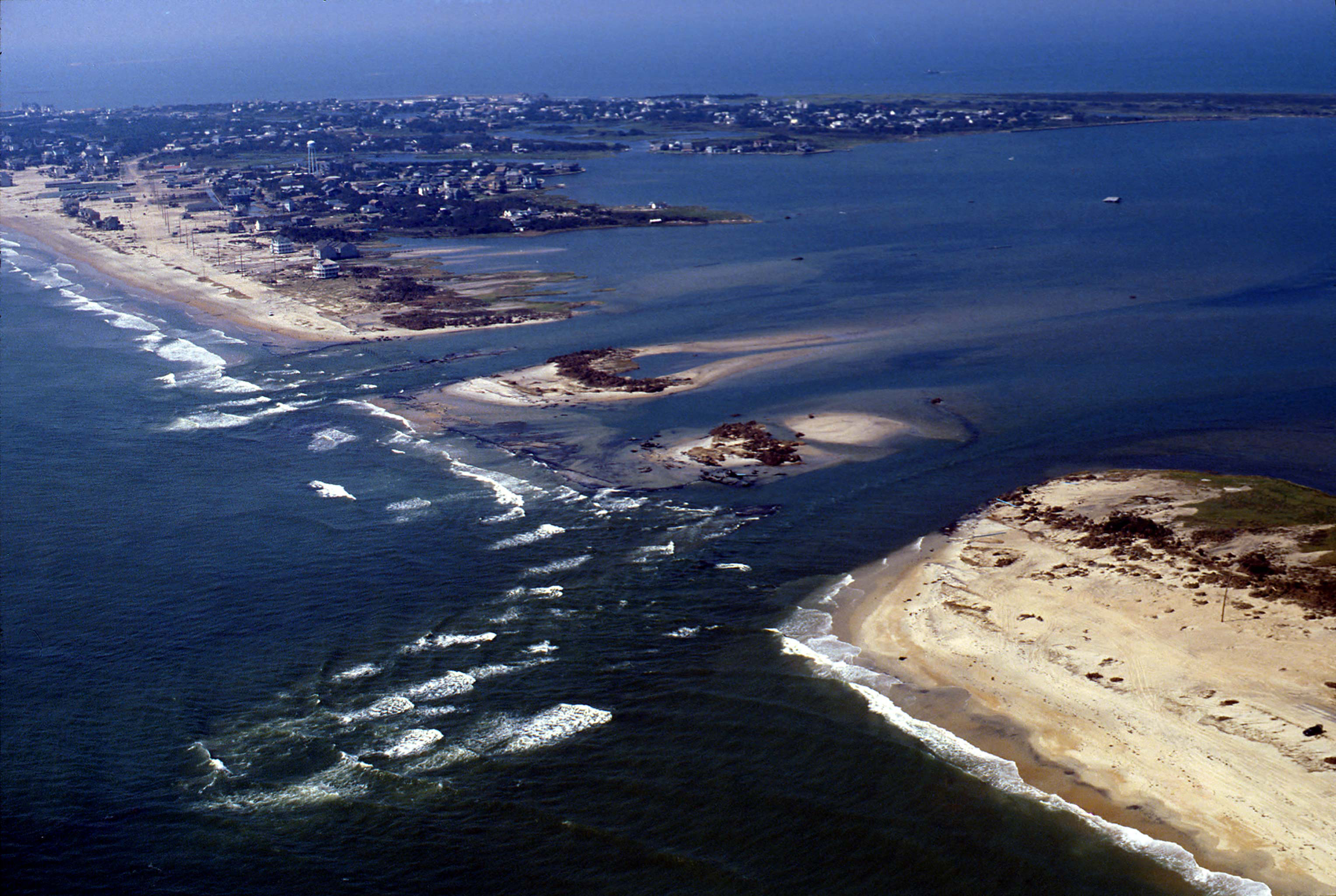
New inlet created by Hurricane Isabel (USGS)

The period from 1980 to the present encompasses 120 tropical or subtropical cyclones that affected the state. Collectively, cyclones in North Carolina during the time period resulted in over $10 billion in damage (2010 USD), primarily from hurricanes Fran and Floyd. Additionally, tropical cyclones in North Carolina were responsible for 77 direct fatalities and at least 44 indirect casualties during the period. Eight cyclones affected the state in the 1985 season, which was the year with the most tropical cyclones striking the state. Every year included at least one tropical cyclone affecting the state.

The strongest hurricane to hit the state during this time period was Hurricane Fran in 1996, which struck near Wilmington as a Category 3 hurricane on the Saffir–Simpson hurricane scale; Hurricane Emily in 1993 brushed the Outer Banks, also as a Category 3 hurricane. Onslow County was hit by Category 2 Hurricane Bonnie in August 1998, causing heavy rains, flooding, an estimated $480 million in damage and several fatalities. The deadliest hurricane during the period was Hurricane Floyd in 1999, which caused 35 fatalities and record–breaking flooding in the eastern portion of the state. In September 2010, Category 2 Hurricane Earl passed roughly 100 miles off the coast of North Carolina, bringing heavy rainfall, storm surge, and strong winds for much of the Outer Banks. Category 4 Hurricane Irene hit the Outer Banks in August 2011, making it the first hurricane to make landfall in the United States since Hurricane Ike in 2008. In October 2016, Hurricane Matthew brought catastrophic flooding to the state. In September 2018, Category 4 Hurricane Florence made landfall in Wrightsville Beach, causing major flooding across the state, coinciding with many areas still recovering from Hurricane Matthew two years prior. Dropping nearly three feet of rain, Florence remains as North Carolina's wettest hurricane. In 2019, Category 2 Hurricane Dorian made landfall on Cape Hatteras, causing large storm surges to sweep across some islands, particularly Ocracoke. Category 1 Hurricane Isaias made landfall in Ocean Isle Beach on August 4, 2020. In September 2022, Post-Tropical Cyclone Ian caused significant power outages, heavy rainfall, and several tornadoes across the state. In September 2023, Tropical Storm Ophelia made landfall near Emerald Isle as a high-end tropical storm with sustained winds of 70 mph, causing heavy rainfall and considerable wind damage along the Crystal Coast. In August 2024, Hurricane Debby traversed through the Carolinas and brought prolonged torrential rainfall, leading to significant flash flooding events across North Carolina. Debby also produced nine tornadoes in the state, with an EF3 tornado in Wilson County resulting in one fatality. In September 2024, Hurricane Helene brought catastrophic flooding and infrastructure damage to North Carolina and other states. Almost 100 fatalities were reported in Buncombe County, with several more elsewhere nearby.

== Ranked storms ==
=== Based on death toll ===
The table lists hurricanes by death tolls of over 20 fatalities. Direct deaths are those that are directly caused by the storm passage, such as drownings or deaths from being struck by windblown objects. Indirect deaths, which are not included in the toll of Hurricane Floyd, are those that are related to the storm, but not directly from its storm effects. Due to lack of data, many early hurricanes have overall death tolls that do not specify indirect or direct.

Total deaths
Name	Year	Number of deaths
Unnamed	1857	424
"Independence"	1775	163
Helene	2024	108
"Racer's Storm"	1837	90
Floyd	1999	57
Unnamed	1883	53
Unnamed	1772	50
Florence	2018	43
Matthew	2016	28
"Outer Banks"	1933	21
"San Ciriaco"	1899	20

=== Based on total damage cost ===
List of costliest North Carolina hurricanes
Rank	Hurricane	Season	Damage	Source
1	TS Helene	2024	$59.6 billion	
2	1 Florence	2018	$22 billion	
3	1 Matthew	2016	$4.8 billion	
4	2 Floyd	1999	$3 billion	
5	3 Fran	1996	$2.4 billion	

== See also ==
- Climate of North Carolina
- Geography of North Carolina
- Hazard mitigation in the Outer Banks
- List of United States hurricanes
- List of wettest known tropical cyclones in North Carolina
- List of Atlantic hurricanes
