= Plug-in electric vehicles in North Carolina =

As of June 2023, there were approximately 70,000 electric vehicles registered in North Carolina.

== Government policy ==
As of January 2022, the state government does not offer any tax rebates for electric vehicle purchases.

== Manufacturing ==
North Carolina is widely considered to be a potential manufacturing hub for both electric vehicles and charging stations.

== By region ==
=== Charlotte ===
As of April 2022, there were 88 electric vehicles in the Charlotte city fleet.

=== Winston-Salem ===
As of June 2022, there were more than 120 public charging stations in Winston-Salem.
