= List of storms named Dennis =

The name Dennis has been used for five tropical cyclones in the Atlantic Ocean, one in the Australian Region and for one extratropical European windstorm. The name was removed from reuse in the Atlantic after the 2005 season, and was replaced by Don for the 2011 season.

In the Atlantic:

- Hurricane Dennis (1981) – a Category 1 hurricane that made landfall in Cuba and then Florida, causing moderate damage.
- Tropical Storm Dennis (1987) – remained in the open ocean
- Tropical Storm Dennis (1993) – never threatened land
- Hurricane Dennis (1999) – a Category 2 hurricane that grazed the Bahamas and stalled east of Outer Banks of North Carolina before making landfall there
- Hurricane Dennis (2005) – a potent and damaging storm that made landfall in Cuba twice as a Category 4 hurricane and once in Florida as a Category 3

In the Australian region:

- Cyclone Dennis (1996) – a weak Category 1 tropical cyclone that made landfall in Queensland

In Europe:

- Storm Dennis (2020) – an intense storm that affected the Republic of Ireland, the United Kingdom, and Scandinavia
