= Dennis, North Carolina =

Dennis
- Populated place
- Location in North Carolina
- Coordinates: 36.225°N 80.170°W
- Country: United States
- State: North Carolina
- County: Forsyth
- Elevation: 846 ft (258 m)
- Time zone: UTC-5 (Eastern (EST))
  - Summer (DST): UTC-4 (EDT)
- ZIP code: 27052
- Area code: 336
- GNIS feature ID: 984132

Dennis is a populated place in Forsyth County, North Carolina, United States.

== History ==
Thomas Dennis Waddill built a depot in 1889 about halfway between Walkertown and Walnut Cove on the Roanoke & Southern Railroad. Waddill, who owned 1700 acres in the area, also built a mansion nearby which was demolished in the 1990s. Waddill became known as The Earl of Dennis. The depot burned in the 1930s. A post office and store were once located in the community.

== Geography ==
Dennis is located at latitude 36.2251371 and longitude -80.1700459. The elevation is 846 feet.
