= Dennis, Putnam County, Georgia =

Unincorporated community in Georgia, U.S.

Coordinates: 33°12′51″N 83°20′33″W

Dennis is an unincorporated community in Putnam County, Georgia, United States. It lies at an elevation of 453 feet (138 m).
