= Kratzerville, Pennsylvania =

Unincorporated community in Pennsylvania, US

Kratzerville
- Census-designated place
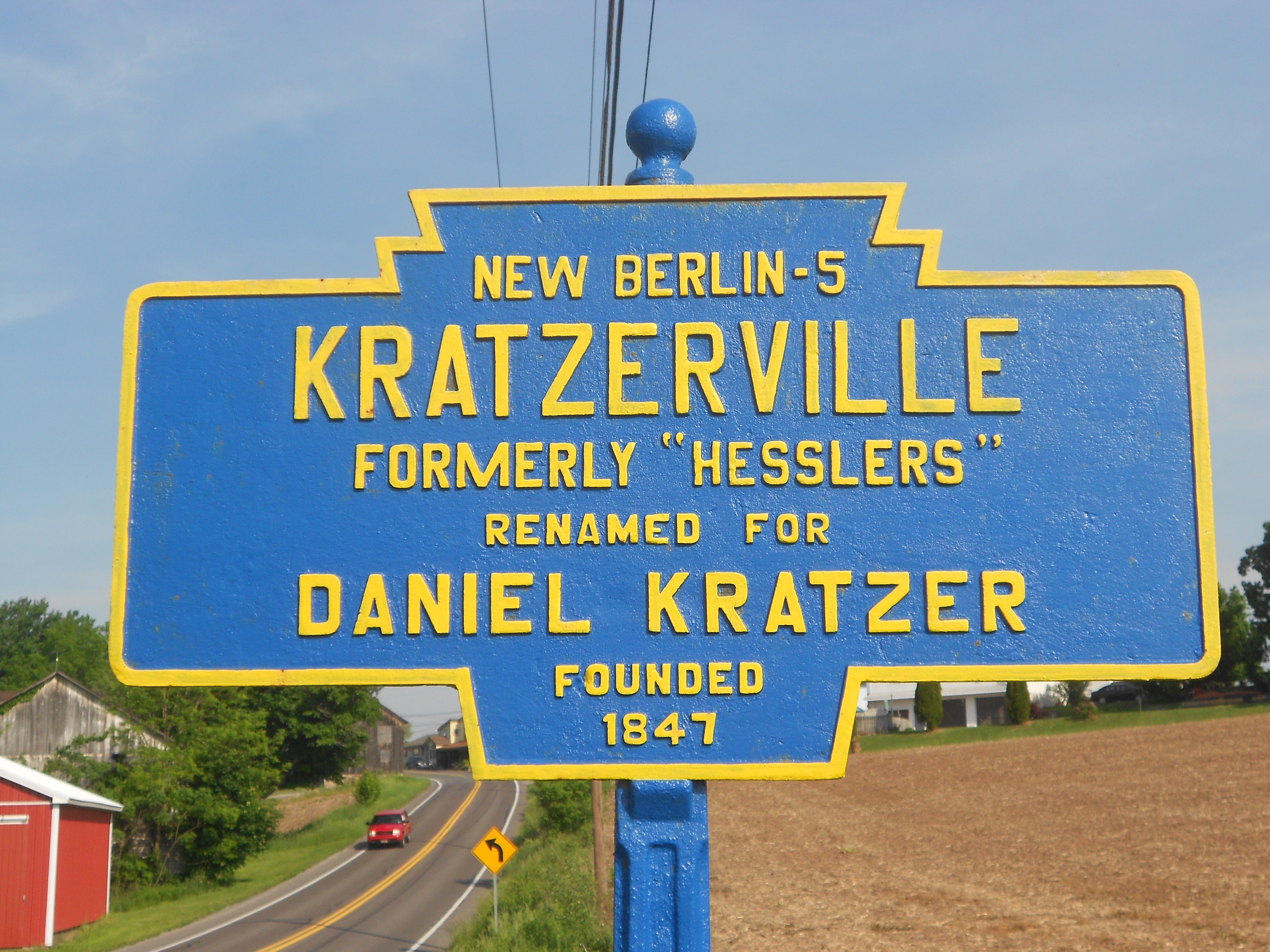
- Keystone Marker for Kratzerville

- Location within the U.S. state of Pennsylvania Kratzerville (the United States)
- Coordinates: 40°51′26″N 76°53′38″W
- Country: United States
- State: Pennsylvania
- County: Snyder

Area
  - Total: 0.96 sq mi (2.49 km^{2})
  - Land: 0.94 sq mi (2.43 km^{2})
  - Water: 0.023 sq mi (0.06 km^{2})

Population (2020)
  - Total: 394
  - Density: 419.7/sq mi (162.06/km^{2})
- Time zone: UTC-5 (Eastern (EST))
  - Summer (DST): UTC-4 (EDT)
- FIPS code: 42-40432

Kratzerville is a census-designated place in Jackson Township, Snyder County, Pennsylvania, United States. The population was 391 at the 2000 census.

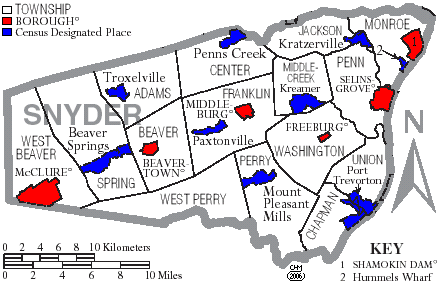
Map of Snyder County, Pennsylvania with Municipal Labels showing Boroughs (red), Townships (white), and Census-designated places (blue).

== Geography ==
Kratzerville is located at 40°51′26″N 76°53′38″W (40.857229, -76.893989).

According to the United States Census Bureau, Kratzerville has an area of 1.0 square mile (2.6 km^{2}), all land.

== Demographics ==
Historical population
Census	Pop.	Note	%±
2020	394		—
U.S. Decennial Census

As of the census of 2000, there were 391 people, 160 households, and 122 families residing in Kratzerville. The population density was 398.6 inhabitants per square mile (153.9/km^{2}). There were 167 housing units at an average density of 170.2 per square mile (65.7/km^{2}). The racial makeup of Kratzerville was 98.98% White, 0.51% African American, 0.51% from other races. Hispanic or Latino of any race were 0.51% of the population.

There were 160 households, out of which 25.6% had children under the age of 18 living with them, 66.3% were married couples living together, 7.5% had a female householder with no husband present, and 23.8% were non-families. 20.6% of all households were made up of individuals, and 8.1% had someone living alone who was 65 years of age or older. The average household size was 2.44 and the average family size was 2.79.

The population of Kratzerville was spread out, with 18.4% under the age of 18, 9.7% from 18 to 24, 29.4% from 25 to 44, 29.7% from 45 to 64, and 12.8% who were 65 years of age or older. The median age was 42 years. For every 100 females, there were 92.6 males. For every 100 females age 18 and over, there were 91.0 males.

The median income for a household in Kratzerville was $42,292, and the median income for a family was $46,250. Males had a median income of $30,682 versus $22,321 for females. The per capita income for Kratzerville was $20,008. About 1.6% of families and 3.1% of the population were below the poverty line, including none of those under age 18 and 10.2% of those age 65 or over.

== Government ==
Snyder County Government directory

Snyder County is governed by three elected county commissioners.
