= Hazard mitigation in the Outer Banks =

Barrier islands along the east coast of North Carolina, USA

The Outer Banks are the barrier islands along the east coast of North Carolina in the United States. They are extremely sensitive to environmental hazards, particularly hurricanes. Hazard mitigation plans have been created and are implemented when a hurricane is forecasted to strike the Outer Banks. The goal of the plans is to identify the policies and tools that are needed in order to reduce or eliminate the risk of life and property loss from any event that may occur in the Outer Banks.

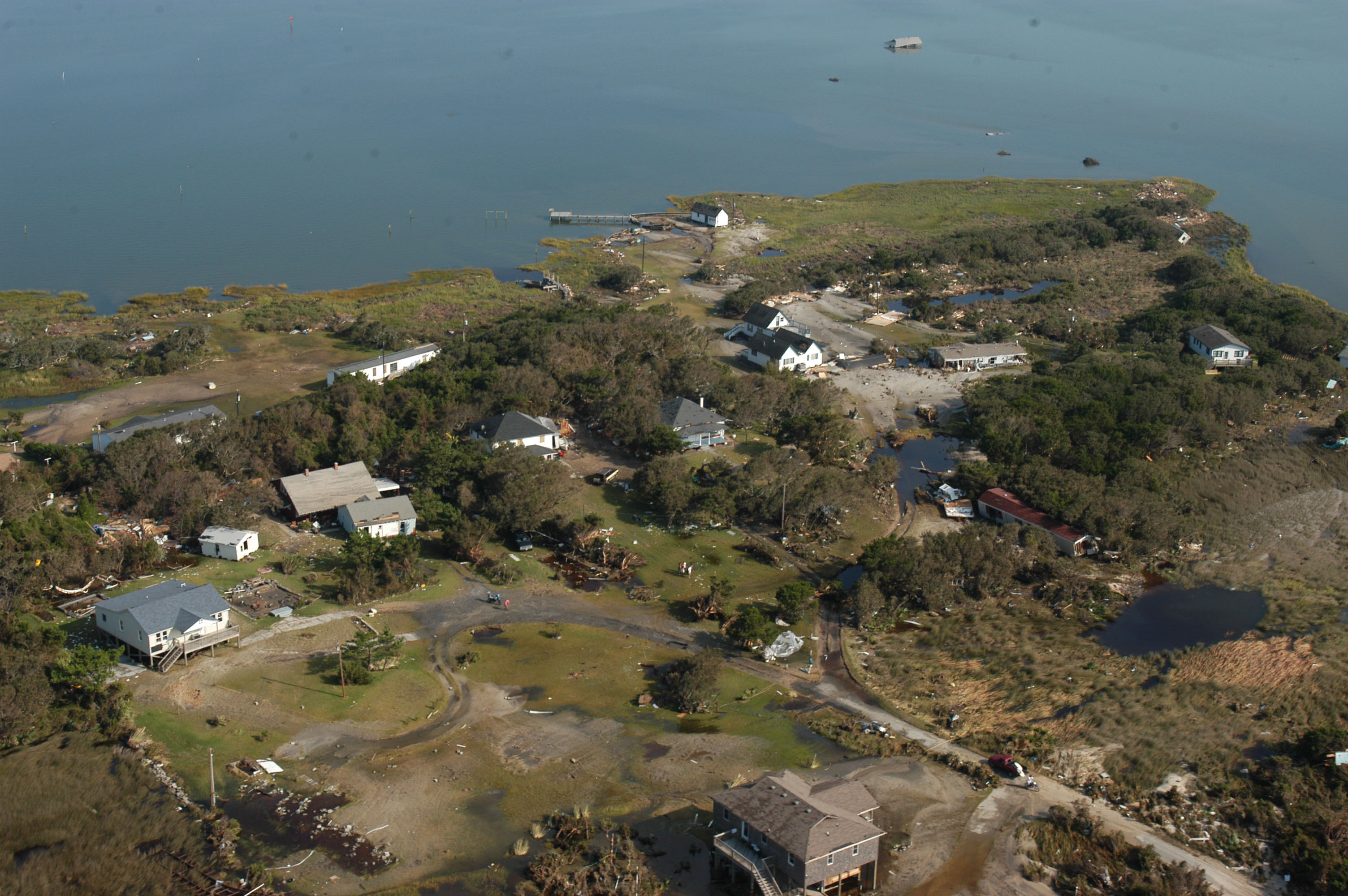
FEMA - 8458 - Photograph by Mark Wolfe taken on 09-20-2003 in North Carolina

== Geography ==
Offshore deposits of sand and other sediments that parallel the coast line collected over thousands of years, forming the long, narrow barrier islands. The long, thin strip of land separates the Atlantic Ocean from the Currituck, Albemarle, and Pamlico sounds. The islands of the Outer Banks travel 325 miles (523 km) along the coastline of North Carolina. The formation protects the coastline from severe storm damage and harbors the many different habitats surrounded by the islands, providing refuge for wildlife. Several islands are separated from each other by tidal inlets which provide a regular exchange between the water of the ocean to bays and estuaries. The barrier islands and sandbars that make up the Outer Banks are highly fragile and are constantly changing their coastal landscape; some of the islands may only be 0.5 miles (0.80 km) wide and may recede back into the ocean over time.

Barrier island zones structure the islands of the Outer Banks from the ocean side to the sound. The beach faces the ocean and consists mainly of sand deposits created by wave action. Dunes of compacted sand and sediment behind the beach deposited by the wind. Front dune ridges may be followed by a secondary line of dunes further inland. Plants naturally found on dunes help to stabilize them by preventing potential damage caused by water and wind with their roots. Behind the dunes are mudflats, which are formed by sediment passing through dune systems by storm winds. Salt marshes fall behind barrier flats in low-lying areas that border the sound side of the island, and are flooded regularly by tides.

Along the beaches of the Outer Banks, plants and beach grasses like Eastern prickly pear, cabbage palmetto, and dwarf palmetto grow. Pindo and windmill palms are not indigenous to the area, but are located in many areas of the mainland. Towards the sound side, seagrasses, aloe yucca and wax myrtles nestle. A maritime forest known as Nags Head Forest is located within Nags Head, and is located on the mainland side of the island. Oak, ferns, pine, magnolias, cedars, willows, goldenrods, and cattails thrive among the forest. Ancient dune swales provide areas to capture precipitation, providing fresh water.

== Demographics ==
North Carolina has 20 coastal counties that are part of the Coastal Area Management Act (CAMA), of which Hyde County, Dare County and Currituck County include the barrier islands. The economic and social demographics of these counties factor heavily into the mitigation and recovery plans, as these statistics allow a better understanding of the necessary mitigation techniques that need to be in place in the event of a natural disaster. The statistics include a number of factors, such as the number of households in the counties and their monthly or annual incomes.

According to the 2010 census, Dare County is the most populated of the three barrier island counties, with a population of 33,920 people, a population density of 100.26, and 383.42 square miles (993.1 km^{2}) of land. The second most-populated county is Currituck, which has a population of 23,547 people, a population density of 101.39, and 261.85 square miles (678.2 km^{2}) of land. Hyde County has the smallest population with 5,810 people, a population density of 9.07, and 612.70 square miles (1,586.9 km^{2}).

The median household income from 2006 to 2010 was $55,376 for Currituck County, $44,167 in Dare County, and $38,265 in Hyde County. The percent of the population below the poverty line was 8.5% in Currituck County, 16.3% in Dare County, and 20.4% in Hyde County.

In the previous year Hyde County received $70,512 in federal funding, Currituck County received $230,625 in federal funding, and Dare County received $725,521, resulting in a total of $1,026,658 in federal funding.

== Infrastructure ==
The largest infrastructure in the barrier islands in terms of mileage is North Carolina Highway 12 (NC 12), which runs north and south along the shoreline of the Outer Banks and includes 138 miles of roadway. NC 12 is the main road that links all of the islands of the Outer Banks together. There are several bridges along the highway, which include the Wright Memorial Bridge, the Virginia Dare Memorial Bridge, the Washington Baum Bridge, and the Bonner Bridge.

== Hurricanes ==
The Outer Banks are susceptible to recurring hurricanes. For a storm to be classified as a hurricane, the organized area of intense thunderstorms must develop a well-defined area of surface circulation and maximum sustained winds speeds that measure over 74 mph (119 km/h). Hurricanes are classified into five different categories measured by the Saffir–Simpson scale, which categorizes them based on their wind speeds, barometric pressure, and storm surge.

=== Hazards produced by hurricanes ===
Wind damage
Hurricane-force winds speeds can exceed 150 mph. They can easily destroy mobile homes and buildings not built to hurricane code. Intense winds can also uproot trees, damage power poles, tear away house rooftops, and dismantle communication availability and transportation links. The right side of the eye wall has the highest wind intensity.
Inland flooding
Intense rainfalls carried by hurricanes can produce a quick accumulation of storm water that is classified as inland flooding. Hurricanes produce on average rainfalls between six and twelve inches. The risk of inland flooding for the Outer Banks varies upon several circumstances, such as the storm's speed: if a hurricane stalls and moves slow along its track, it has more time to dump rain in an area. If areas have received heavy rainfalls prior to a hurricane, soils may become saturated and become unable to absorb more water. Destructive inland flooding caused by hurricanes can wash away roads and highways. Current building codes for the Outer Banks require the first floor of a house to be elevated nine to ten feet above sea level. Low lying buildings and vehicles can still be damaged by flood waters.
Storm surge
As a hurricane makes landfall the ocean surface rises by the force of the storm's winds. Storm surges produced by hurricanes can reach heights of up to 20 feet. The total height of a storm surge during a hurricane has an inverse relationship with the storm pressure and a direct relationship with the hurricane's intensity. When a storm surge pushes through the Outer Banks the sounds and bays fill with water, which recedes through the beach towards the ocean, causing flooding and erosion. Storm surges enhance the frequency of waves and strengthens currents which can severely damage marinas, destroy building structures, wash away coastal highways, and erode beaches.

== Hazard mitigation and planning ==
Counties have their own mitigation plans. Dare County's mitigation plan was last updated in 2010.
