= San Dionisio =

San Dionisio is the Spanish-language version of Saint Dionysius. It may refer to:

== Places ==
=== El Salvador ===
- San Dionisio, Usulután

=== Mexico ===
- San Dionisio del Mar, Oaxaca
- San Dionisio Ocotepec, Oaxaca
- San Dionisio Ocotlan, Oaxaca

=== Nicaragua ===
- San Dionisio, Matagalpa

=== Philippines ===
- San Dionisio, Iloilo
- San Dionisio, Parañaque

=== United States ===
- Redoubt San Dionisio, a fortification in Russian America, near today's Wrangell, Alaska

== See also ==
- Saint Dionysius
