= Pizzeria Dennis =

Finnish restaurant chain

Pizzeria Dennis was a Finnish restaurant chain specialising in Italian cuisine and pizza. Dennis Rafkin opened the first restaurant on 1 May 1975 on Linnankatu in Turku, which is open to this day. In November 2022 the chain went bankrupt because of financial difficulties caused by the Russian invasion of Ukraine and the COVID-19 pandemic. The restaurant on Linnankatu in Turku was closed down on 8 November 2022. The chain had another restaurant on Bulevardi in Helsinki.

Dennis was the oldest still functioning pizzeria chain in Finland. The menu included pizza, pasta, risotto and salads. The chain also includes a bakery selling products to retail. The bakery mainly sells fresh pizzas and products to the restaurant and hotel industry. The chain sells products throughout Finland through the S Group and Kesko chains.

In 2018 the total revenue of the Dennis chain owned by the Björkstén family was about 11 million euro and it employed about 120 people. By 2020 the number of employees had decreased to about 20 people.

In late December 2022 the company Dennis-yhtiöt Oy owned by the Rafkin family bought the Pizzeria Dennis trademark back from the bankruptcy estate.
