= East Dublin =

East Dublin may refer to:

- The U.S. city of East Dublin, Georgia
- The eastern part of Dublin, Ireland
- A nickname of Liverpool, England
