= West Laurens High School =

Public high school in Laurens County, Georgia, United States

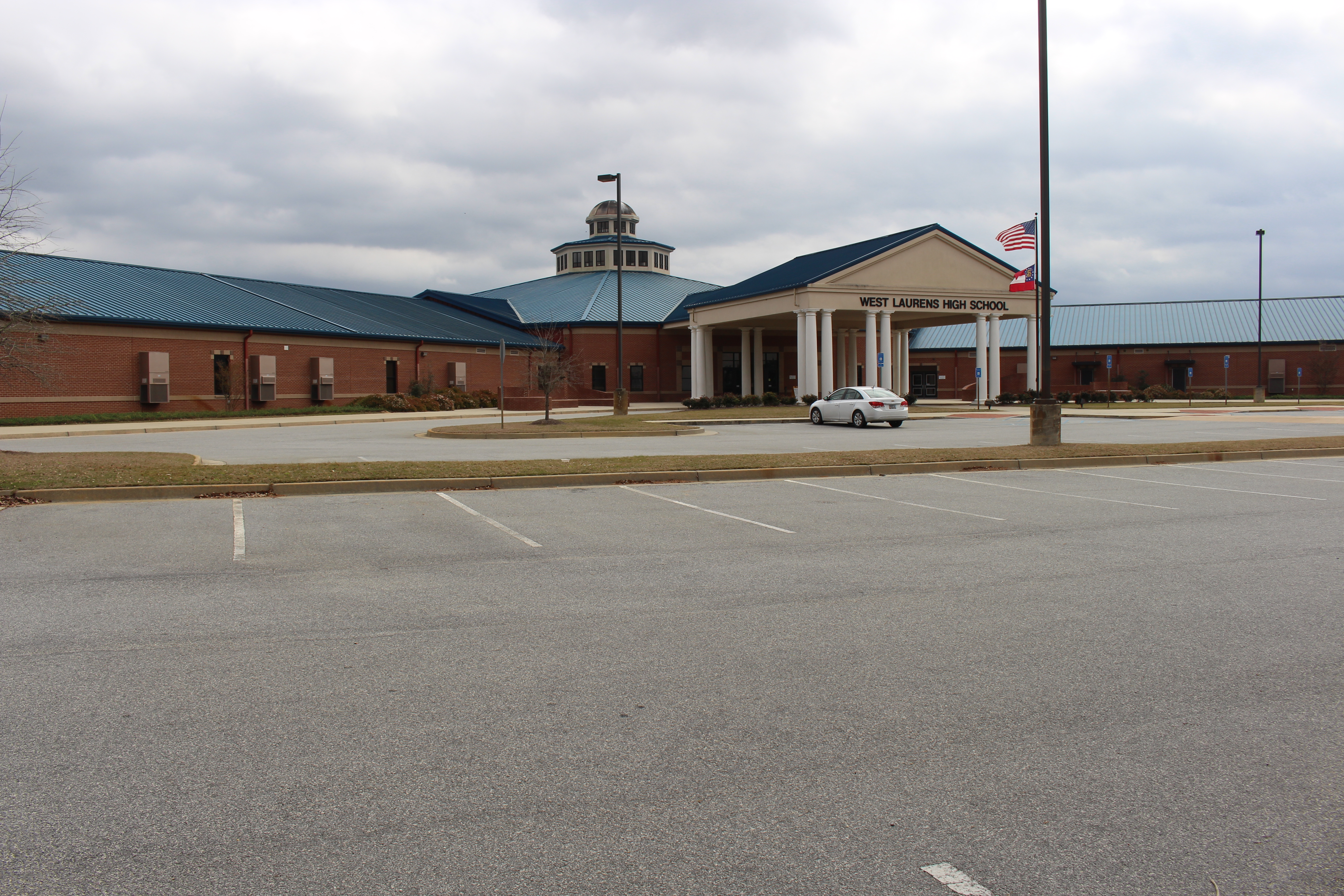

Location
- 3692 GA Highway 257; Dexter, (Laurens County), Georgia 31019-3539; United States
- Coordinates: 32.4495°N 83.0222°W

Information
- School board: Laurens County Board of Education
- School district: Laurens County School District
- Principal: Lynn Long
- Teaching staff: 80.30 FTE
- Grades: 9-12
- Enrollment: 1,241 (2023-2024)
- Student to teacher ratio: 15.45
- Colors: White and blue
- Athletics: GHSA
- Athletics conference: 2
- Sports: Football, baseball, volleyball, softball, golf, tennis, soccer, track and field, cross country, wrestling
- Mascot: Raiders
- Nickname: Raiders
- Team name: Raiders
- Rival: Dublin High School and East Laurens High School
- Accreditation: Georgia Accrediting Commission
- Feeder schools: West Laurens Middle School, Northwest Laurens Elementary School, and Southwest Laurens Elementary School
- Website: wlhs.lcboe.net

West Laurens High School is a public high school located in unincorporated Laurens County, Georgia, United States, near Dexter. The school is part of the Laurens County School District, which serves the county. The overall average on the report card for the school is 81.4898

== Alumni ==
- Dustin Fowler, baseball player
- Anthony Johnson, Junior College National Wrestling Champion; former mixed martial artist in the Light Heavyweight Division of the UFC
- Demaryius Thomas, NFL wide receiver for the Denver Broncos
