= Laurens County School District =

School district in Georgia (U.S. state)

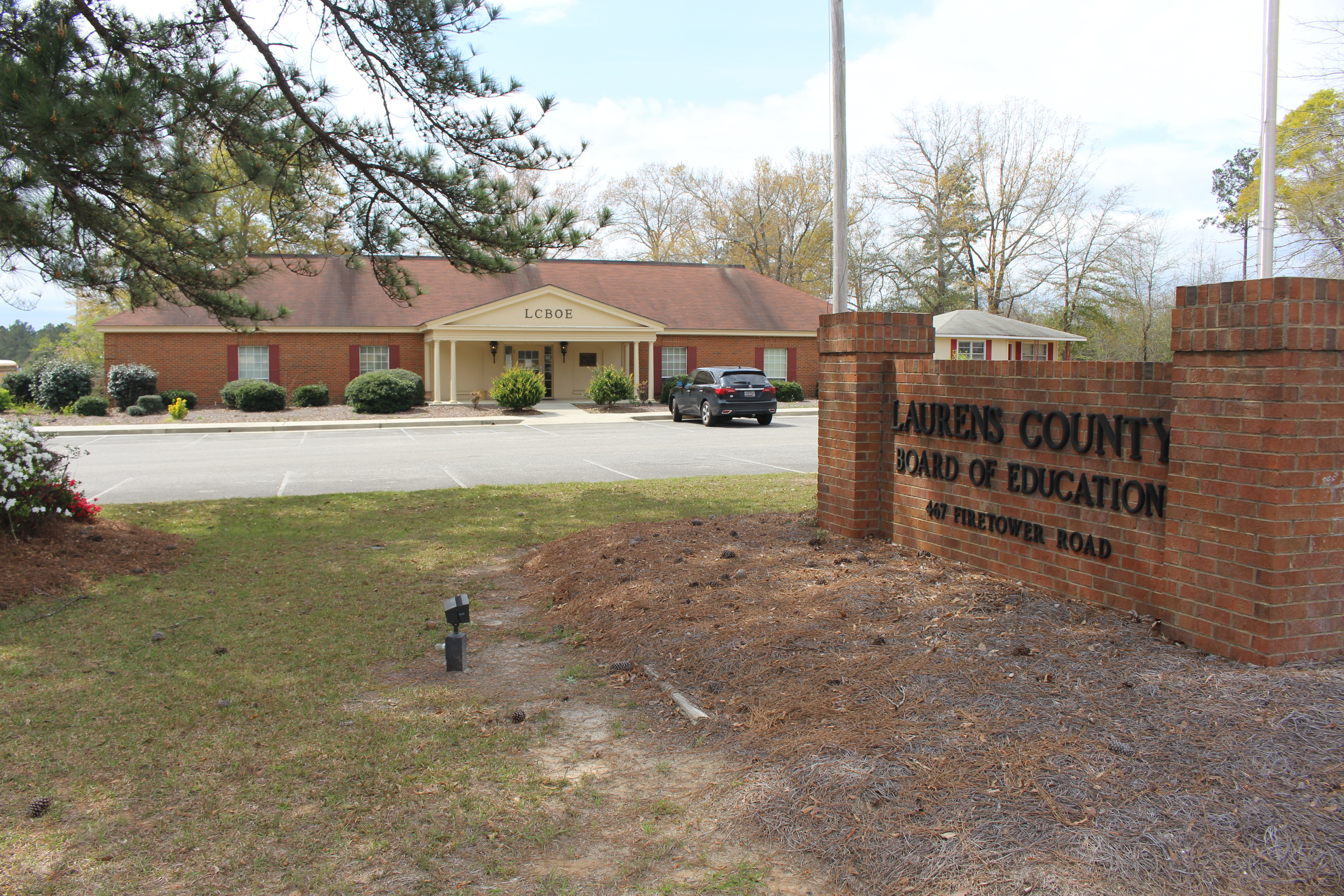
- Headquarters

Address
- 467 Firetower Road Dublin, Georgia, 31021-2682; United States
- Coordinates: 32.500770°N 82.938774°W

District information
- Grades: Pre-school - 12
- Superintendent: Clifford Garnto
- Accreditation(s): Southern Association of Colleges and Schools; Georgia Accrediting Commission
- NCES District ID: 1301890

Students and staff
- Enrollment: 6,034
- Faculty: 381

Other information
- Telephone: (478) 272-4767
- Fax: (478) 277-2619
- Website: www.lcboe.net

The Laurens County School District is a public school district in Laurens County, Georgia, United States, based in Dublin. It serves communities outside of Dublin: Cadwell, Dexter, Dudley, East Dublin, Lovett, Montrose, and Rentz, as well as the Laurens County portion of Allentown. Dublin is within the Dublin City School District.

== Schools ==
The Laurens County School District has four elementary schools, two middle schools, and two high schools.

Elementary schools:

- East Laurens Elementary School
- East Laurens Primary School
- Northwest Laurens Elementary
- Southwest Laurens Elementary

Middle schools:

- East Laurens Middle School
- West Laurens Middle School

High schools:

- East Laurens High School
- West Laurens High School
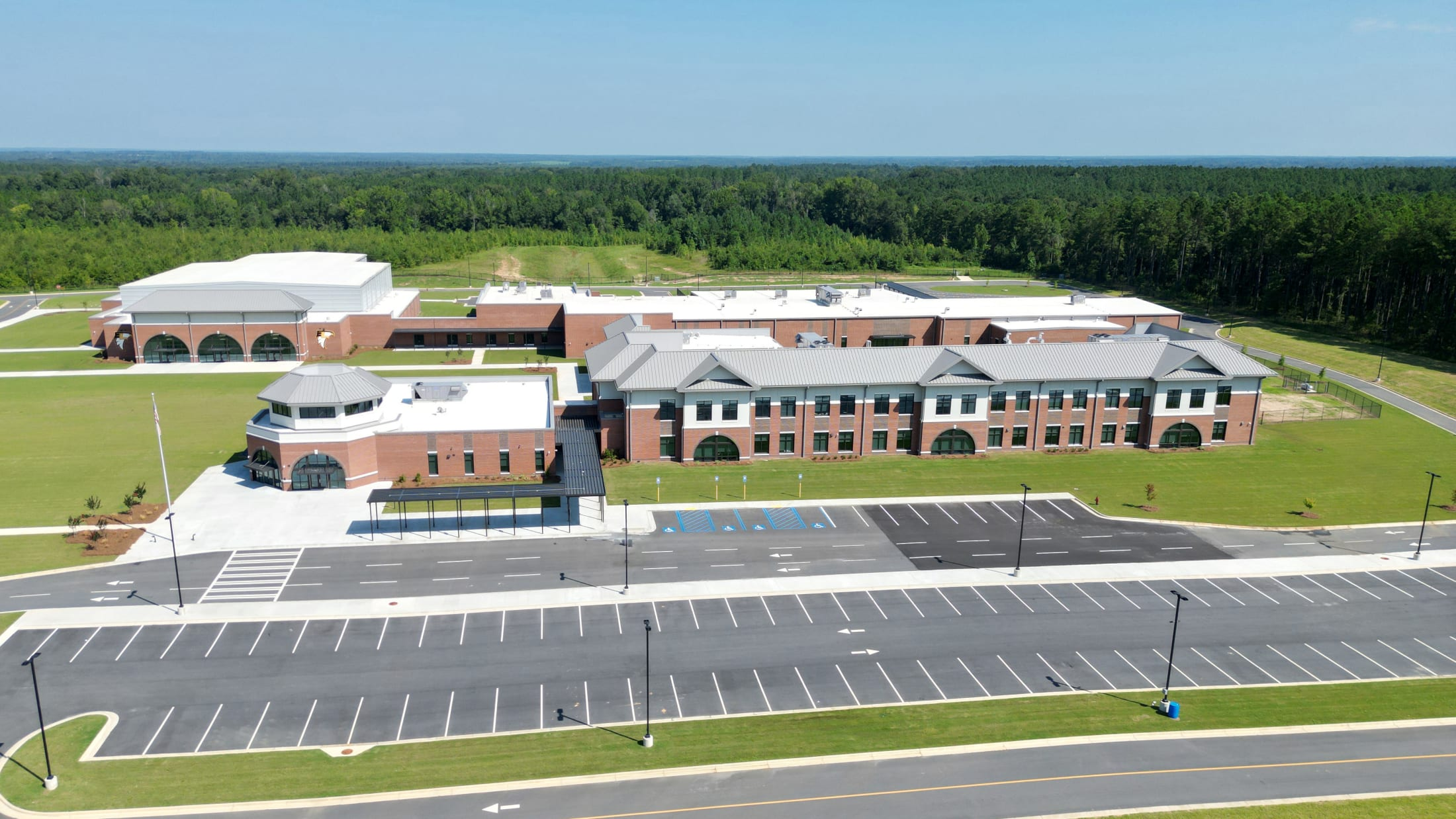
East Laurens High School

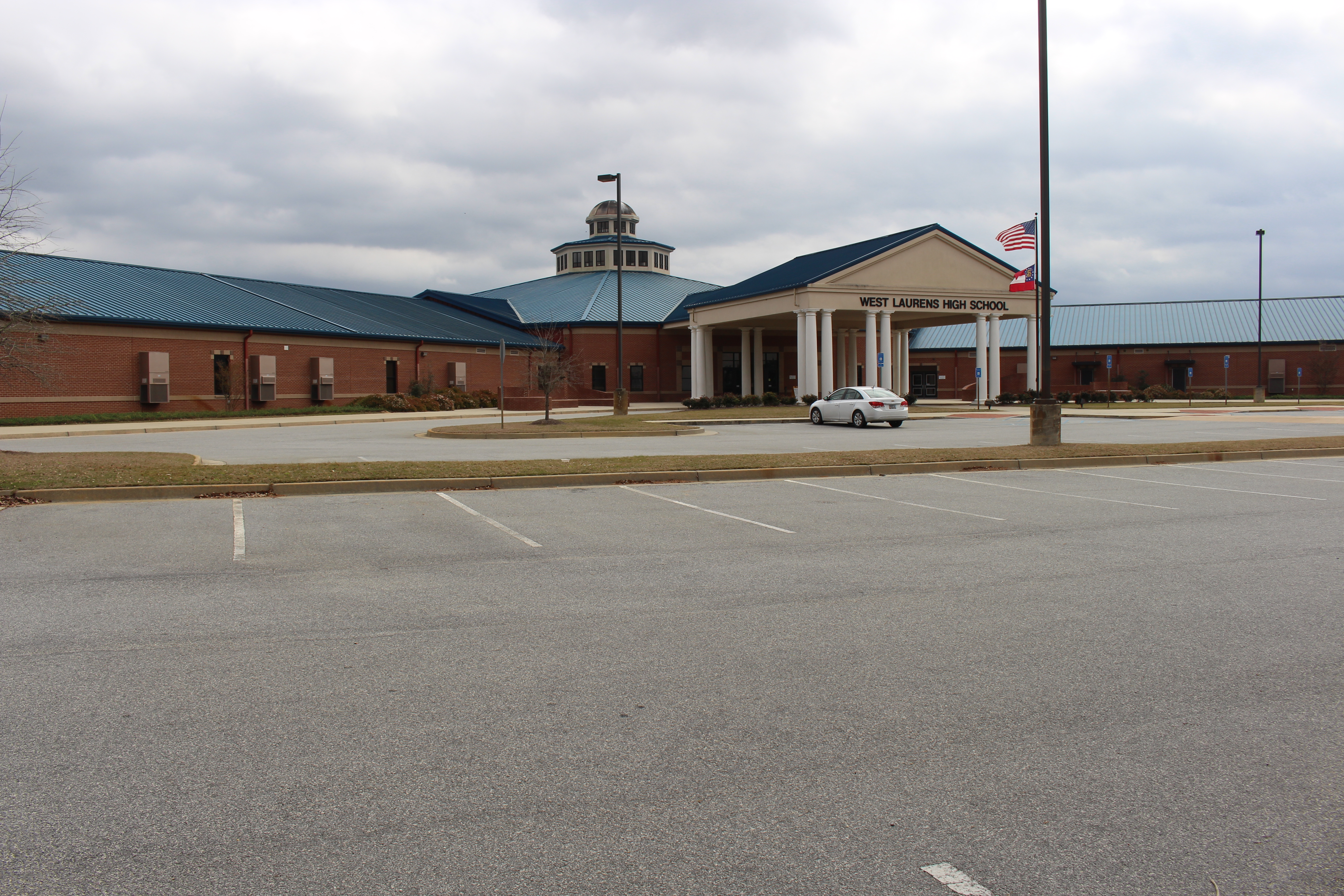
West Laurens High School

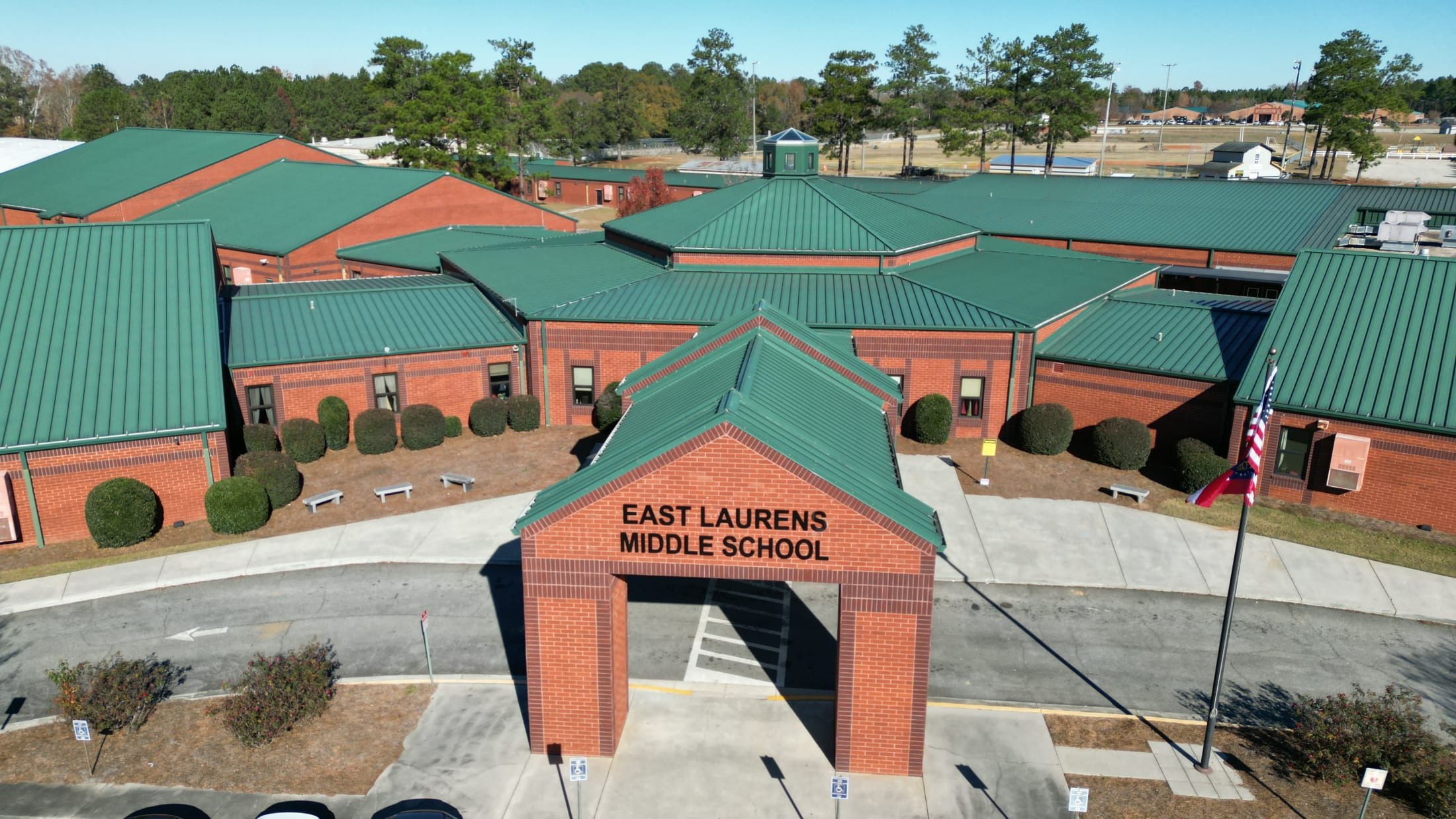
East Laurens Middle School

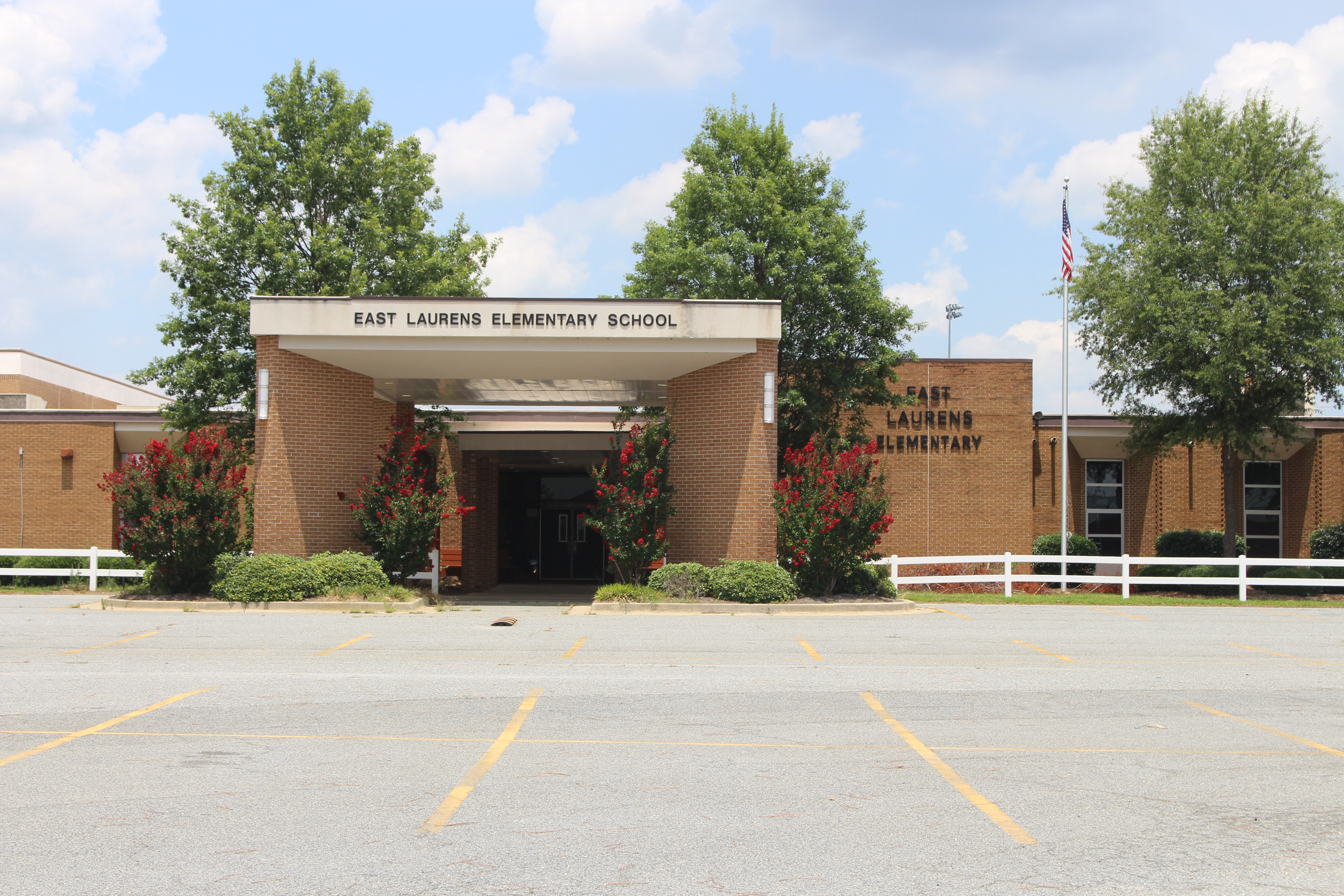
East Laurens Elementary School

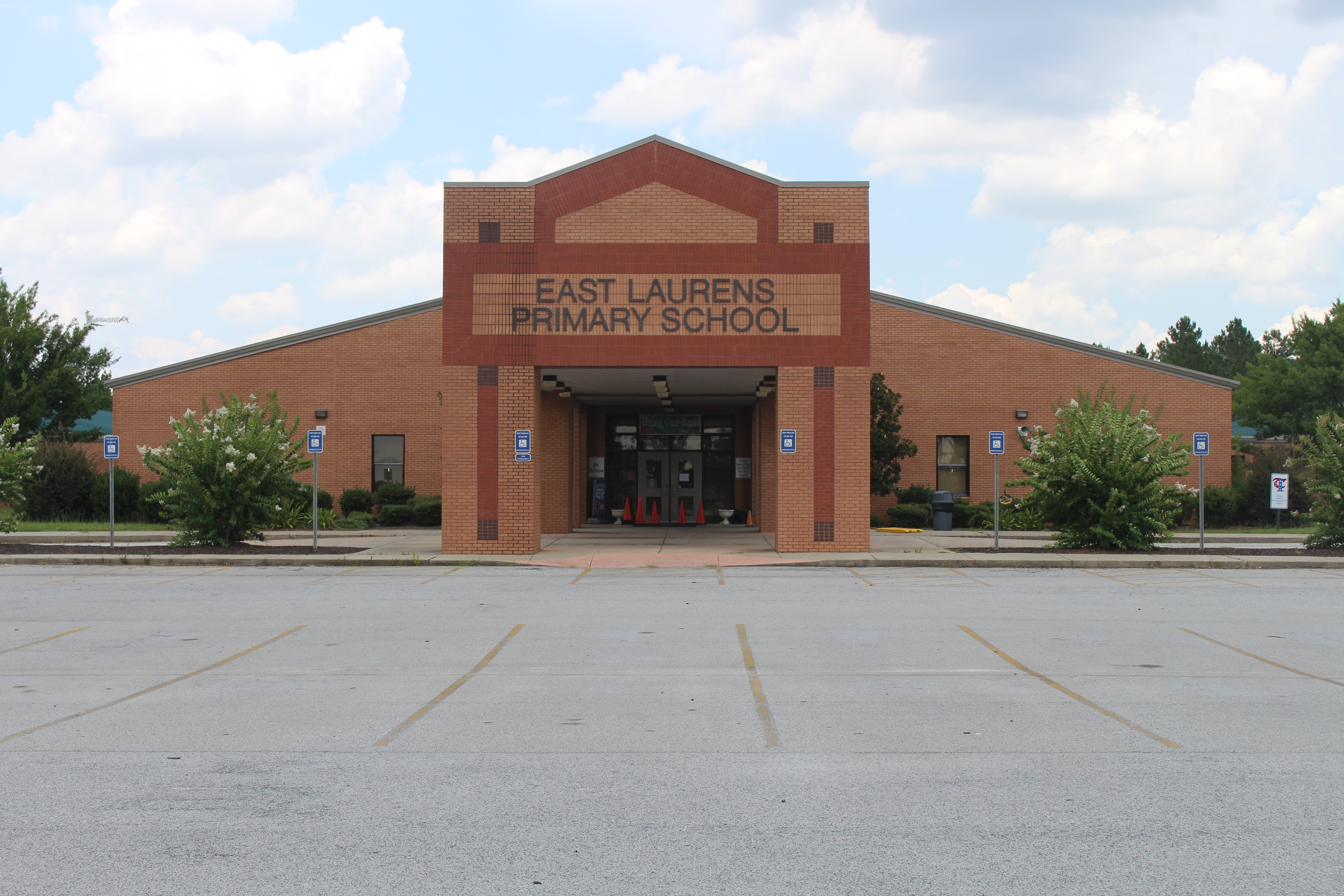
East Laurens Primary School

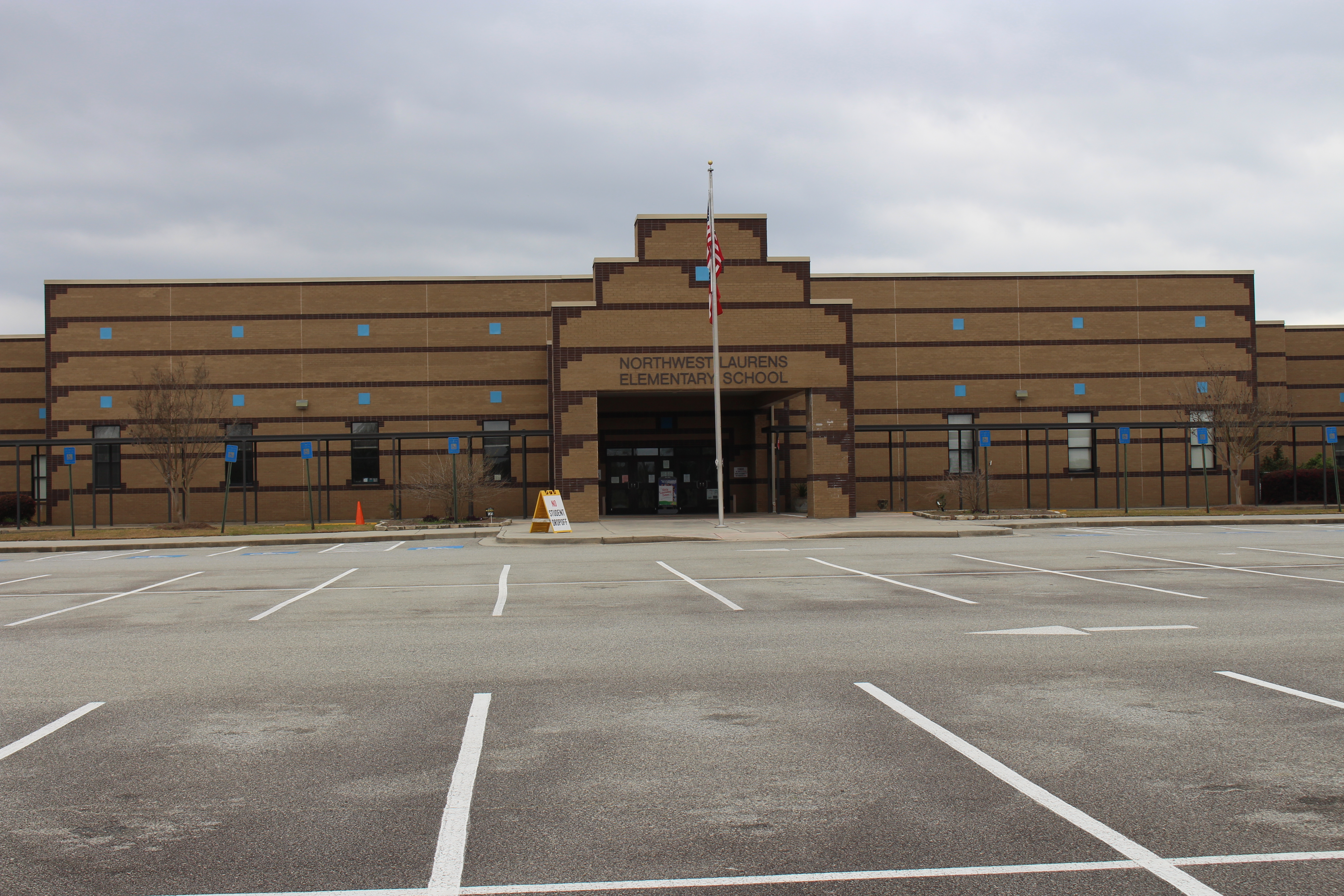
Northwest Laurens Elementary School

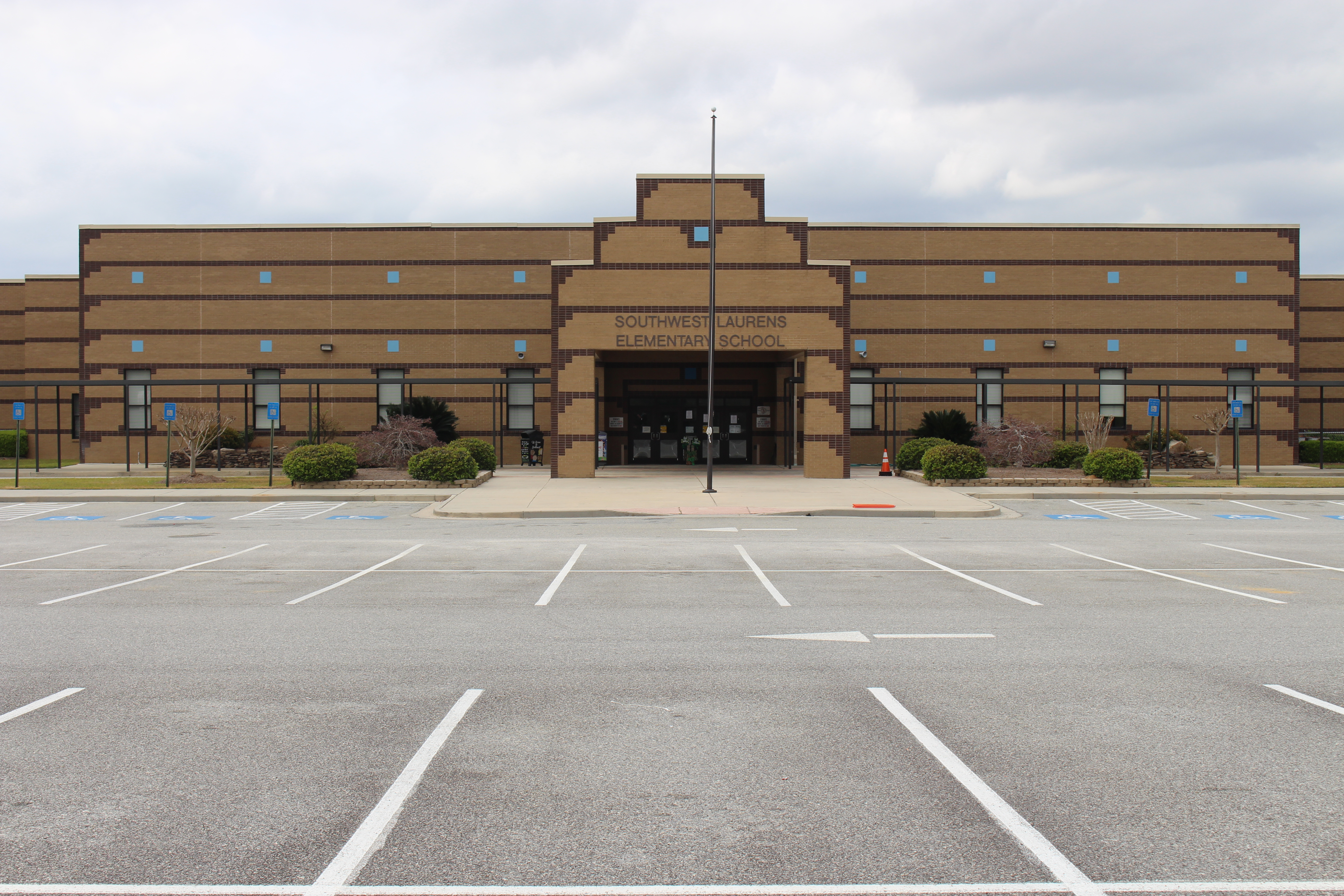
Southwest Laurens Elementary School

== See also ==
- List of school districts in Georgia
