= Dustin Fowler =

American baseball player (born 1994)

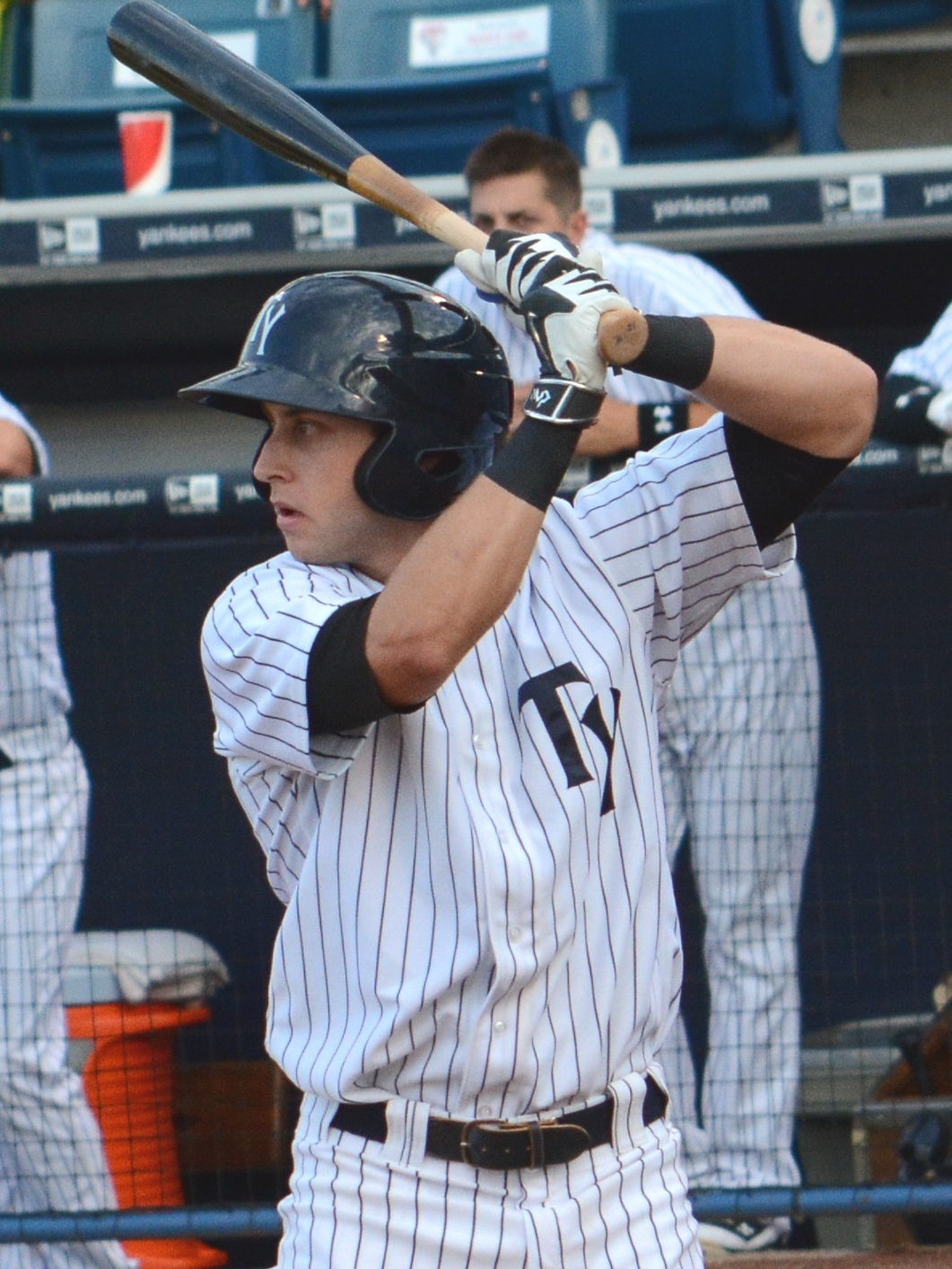
- Fowler with the Tampa Yankees in 2015
- Outfielder
- Born: December 29, 1994 (age 31); Cadwell, Georgia, U.S.
- Batted: Left Threw: Left

MLB debut
- June 29, 2017, for the New York Yankees

Last MLB appearance
- April 21, 2021, for the Pittsburgh Pirates

MLB statistics
- Batting average: .215
- Home runs: 6
- Runs batted in: 25
- Stats at Baseball Reference

Teams
- New York Yankees (2017); Oakland Athletics (2018); Pittsburgh Pirates (2021)

Dustin Ryan Fowler (born December 29, 1994) is an American former professional baseball outfielder. Listed at 6 feet 0 inches (1.83 m) and 195 pounds (88 kg), he bats and throws left-handed. He played in Major League Baseball (MLB) for the New York Yankees, Oakland Athletics, and Pittsburgh Pirates.

== Career ==
=== New York Yankees ===
Fowler attended West Laurens High School in Dexter, Georgia. He committed to play college baseball at Georgia Southern University. The New York Yankees selected Fowler in the 18th round of the 2013 Major League Baseball draft. He signed with the Yankees and made his professional debut with the Gulf Coast League Yankees. He spent the whole season there, batting .241 with nine RBIs in 30 games. Fowler played in 2014 with the Charleston RiverDogs where he compiled a .257 batting average with nine home runs and 41 RBIs in 66 games. He was named the South Atlantic League Player of the Week for the week of June 9 after hitting .393. He began the 2015 season in Charleston before earning a promotion to the High-A Tampa Yankees. He batted a combined .298/.334/.394 with five home runs, 70 RBIs and 30 stolen bases that year. He played in the Arizona Fall League after the 2015 season.

Fowler received a non-roster invitation to spring training in 2016 and played that season with the Trenton Thunder where he batted .281 with 12 home runs, 88 RBIs, and 25 stolen bases in 132 games. He was named an Eastern League Mid-Season All-Star that year. He was again invited to spring training in 2017, and started the season with the Scranton/Wilkes-Barre RailRiders. He was named the International League Player of the Week for the week of April 30 after hitting a walk-off home run to complete the cycle. In July, he was ranked as the 89th best prospect in baseball by Baseball America. In 70 games for Scranton/Wilkes-Barre, he hit .293/.329/.542 with 13 home runs and 43 RBIs.

On June 29, Fowler was promoted to the majors and he made his debut that day after a nearly three-hour rain delay, with the Yankees facing the Chicago White Sox on the road. During the first inning, he ran into a rail while chasing a fly ball, hitting his knee on a sharp edge of an electrical box. He collapsed to the ground and was carted off the field, before being diagnosed with an open rupture of the right patellar tendon. He was ruled out for the season and underwent surgery that night at Rush University Medical Center. Fowler would have led off the next inning for his first major league plate appearance.

=== Oakland Athletics ===
On July 31, 2017, the Yankees traded Fowler to the Oakland Athletics, along with fellow prospects Jorge Mateo and James Kaprielian, for starting pitcher Sonny Gray. On December 15, 2017, Fowler sued the White Sox and the Illinois state agency that manages their ballpark, Guaranteed Rate Field, for allegedly causing his June 29 injury. His lawsuit, which was filed in the Circuit Court of Cook County, according to the Chicago Sun-Times, claimed negligence on the part of the White Sox and the Illinois Sports Facilities Authority in not properly securing the unpadded electrical box he crashed into. In 2018, the defendants tried, and failed, to have the case moved to federal court and dismissed, failing in their claim that Fowler, as an MLB player covered by the league's union contract, could not sue in state court for the injury. A settlement motion was filed in Cook County Circuit Court in February 2022, details of which are not available online.

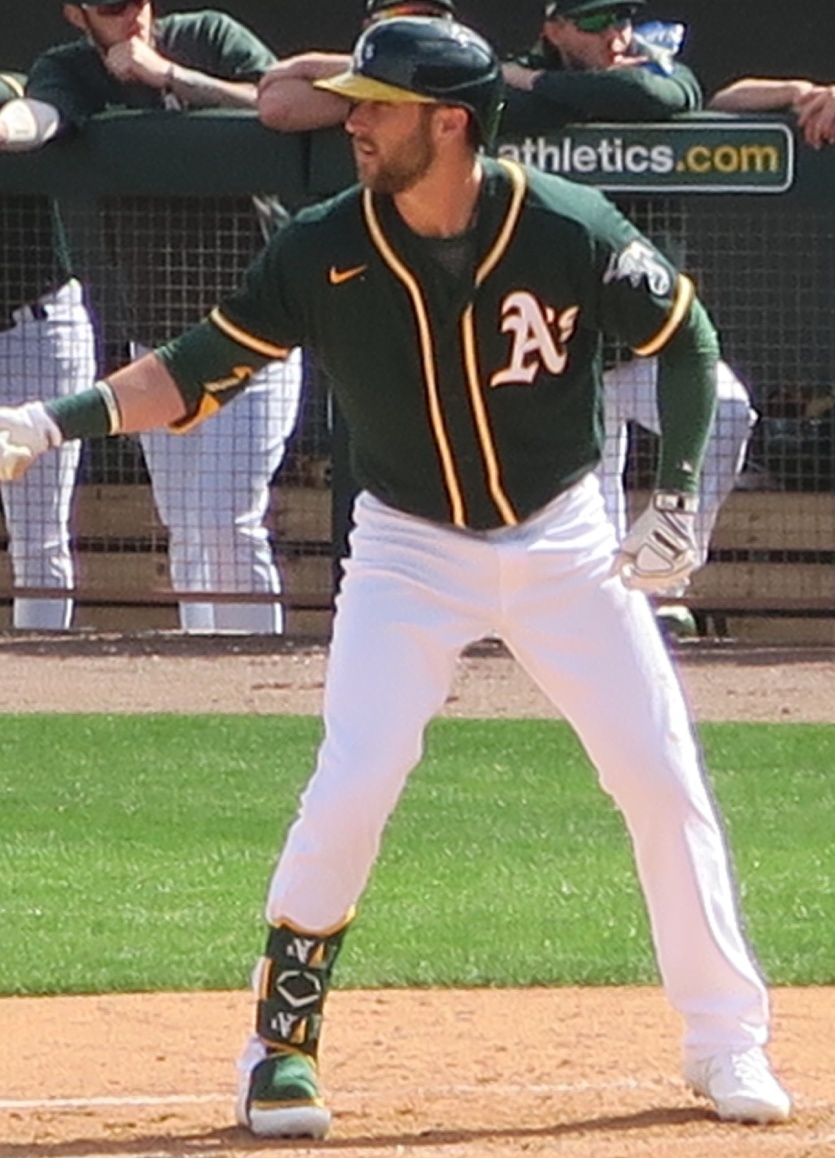
Fowler with the Athletics in February 2020

Fowler began the 2018 season with the Nashville Sounds. The Athletics promoted him to the major leagues on May 9, and he went to bat for the first time in the major leagues that night. He started his first game for Oakland on May 11, and got his first major league hit off Yankee pitcher Sonny Gray, the player he was traded for. On May 18, 2018, he hit his first major league home run off Marco Estrada in a 3-1 victory over the Blue Jays. On August 2, he was sent back down to Triple A Nashville. He was recalled to the majors on August 31. Before the end of spring training in 2019, Fowler was optioned to Triple-A in order to see more time at all three outfield positions. He spent the entire season with the Las Vegas Aviators, despite hitting well. He later said it was a "big shock" to him not getting called up that year.

Before the start of the 2020 season, Fowler was initially reassigned to minor league camp on March 13. However, the season was soon put on hold due to the COVID-19 pandemic. In June, he was included in the Athletics' 60-man player pool for the shortened 2020 season. After not being called up, Fowler was designated for assignment on February 21, 2021, after the Trevor Rosenthal signing was made official. At the time of his designation, Fowler had not appeared in an MLB game since 2018.

=== Pittsburgh Pirates ===
On February 24, 2021, Fowler was traded to the Pittsburgh Pirates in exchange for cash considerations. After starting the season batting .171/.239/.195 with no home runs and two RBIs in 18 games, Fowler was designated for assignment when Todd Frazier was added to the roster on April 22. On April 28, Fowler was outrighted to the alternate training site. Fowler appeared in 13 games for the Triple-A Indianapolis Indians, hitting .270 with three home runs and six RBIs. He spent nearly two months on the minor league injured list. On August 7, Fowler was released by the Pirates organization.

=== Miami Marlins ===
On August 13, 2021, Fowler signed a minor league contract with the Miami Marlins. He was assigned to the Triple-A Jacksonville Jumbo Shrimp, playing in 28 games and hitting .295/.309/.505 with six home runs and 24 RBI. Fowler elected free agency following the season on November 7.
