= Demaryius Thomas =

American football player (1987–2021)

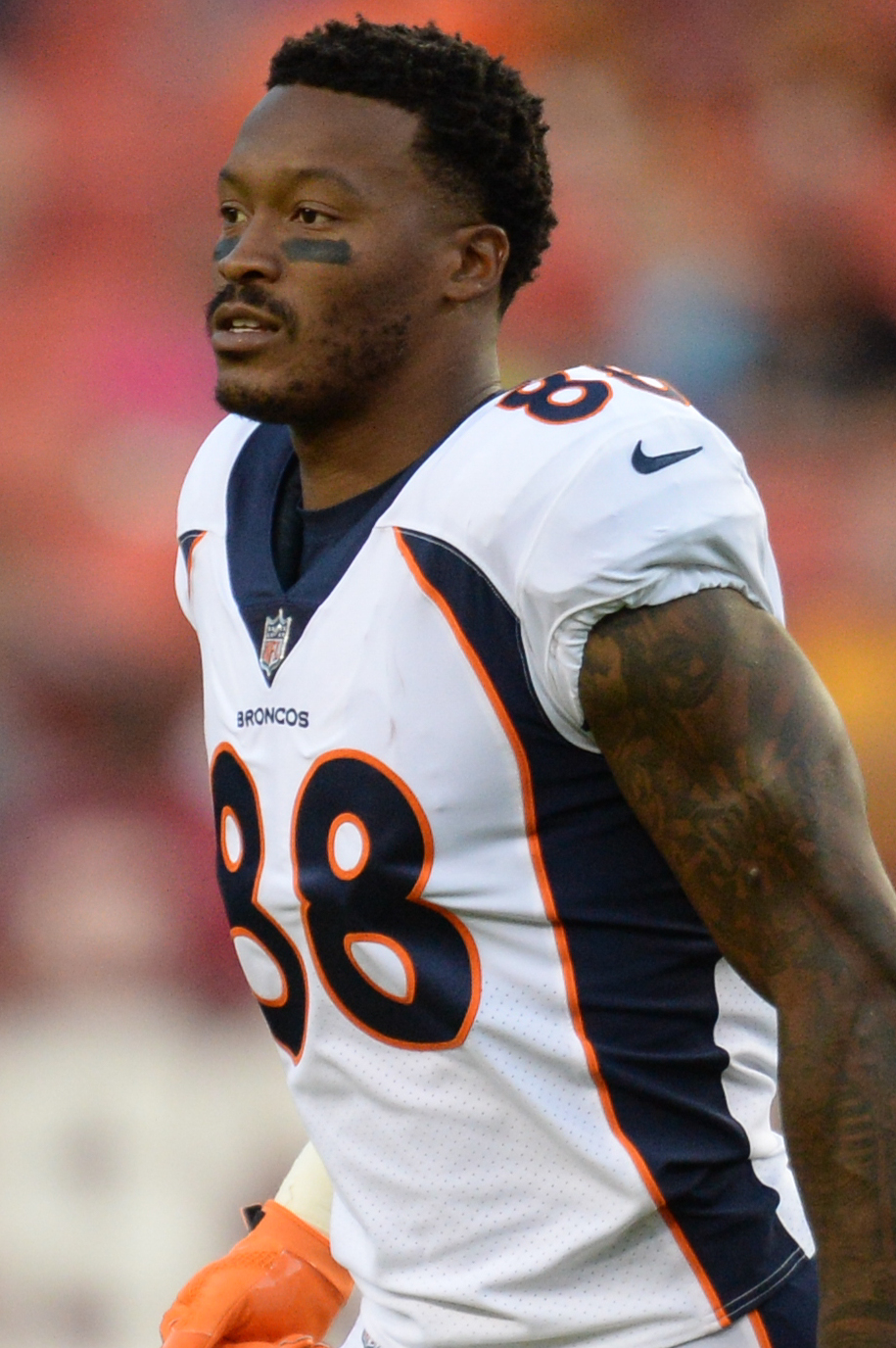
- Thomas with the Denver Broncos in 2018

No. 88, 87, 18
- Position: Wide receiver

Personal information
- Born: December 25, 1987; Montrose, Georgia, U.S.
- Died: December 9, 2021 (aged 33); Roswell, Georgia, U.S.
- Listed height: 6 ft 3 in (1.91 m)
- Listed weight: 225 lb (102 kg)

Career information
- High school: West Laurens (Dexter, Georgia)
- College: Georgia Tech (2006–2009)
- NFL draft: 2010: 1st round, 22nd overall pick

Career history
- Denver Broncos (2010–2018); Houston Texans (2018); New England Patriots (2019); New York Jets (2019)

Awards and highlights
- Super Bowl champion (50); 2× Second-team All-Pro (2013, 2014); 5× Pro Bowl (2012–2016); Denver Broncos Ring of Fame; Third-team All-American (2009); First-team All-ACC (2009)

Career NFL statistics
- Receptions: 724
- Receiving yards: 9,763
- Receiving average: 13.5
- Receiving touchdowns: 63
- Stats at Pro Football Reference

Demaryius Antwon Thomas (December 25, 1987 – December 9, 2021) was an American professional football player who was a wide receiver for 10 seasons in the National Football League (NFL), primarily with the Denver Broncos. He played college football for the Georgia Tech Yellow Jackets, earning third-team All-American honors in 2009. Thomas was selected by the Broncos in the first round of the 2010 NFL draft. With Denver, he made five Pro Bowls and won Super Bowl 50 against the Carolina Panthers. Thomas also played for the Houston Texans, New England Patriots, and New York Jets.

== Early life ==
Thomas was born in Montrose, Georgia, on December 25, 1987. When he was a child, police raided the house where his mother and grandmother lived. Thomas' mother was sentenced to 20 years in prison, and his grandmother to life in prison, for crack cocaine distribution. By all accounts a shy and introverted child, Thomas grew up with his aunt and uncle after his mother was sent to prison. As a child, Thomas was given the nickname "Bay Bay" by his uncle in reference to the bad kids from the movie Bebe's Kids. On July 13, 2015, President Barack Obama commuted his mother's sentence. She was released at midnight a few months later on November 11, and saw her son play football for the first time on January 17, 2016. On August 2, Obama commuted the sentence of Thomas' grandmother.

== High school career ==
Thomas attended West Laurens High School in Dexter, Georgia, where he was a three-sport star in basketball, football, and track. Thomas played wide receiver for the Raiders football team under the direction of then head coach John Kenny. As a junior in 2004, Thomas recorded 32 receptions for 330 yards and three touchdowns. He was named an all-region and all-Heart of Georgia player. As a senior, Thomas recorded 82 receptions for 1,234 yards and 10 touchdowns. After the game, he participated in the North-South All-Star game. Thomas was again selected as an all-region and all-Heart of Georgia, and The Atlanta Journal-Constitution named him to its Class AA all-state first team and PrepStar to its All-Region team. Scout.com assessed Thomas as the 22nd-ranked college prospect in the state of Georgia, and Rivals.com rated him the 34th-ranked such prospect. Thomas received scholarship offers from Duke, Georgia, and Georgia Tech.

In addition to playing football, Thomas competed in track & field at West Laurens. He earned a fourth-place finish in the triple jump event at the 2006 Georgia Olympics after clearing a personal-best mark of 13.92 meters (45–4). As a sprinter, Thomas posted a personal-best time of 10.99 seconds in the 100-meter dash and was a member of the 4 × 100 m relay squad.

== College career ==
=== 2006 and 2007 seasons ===
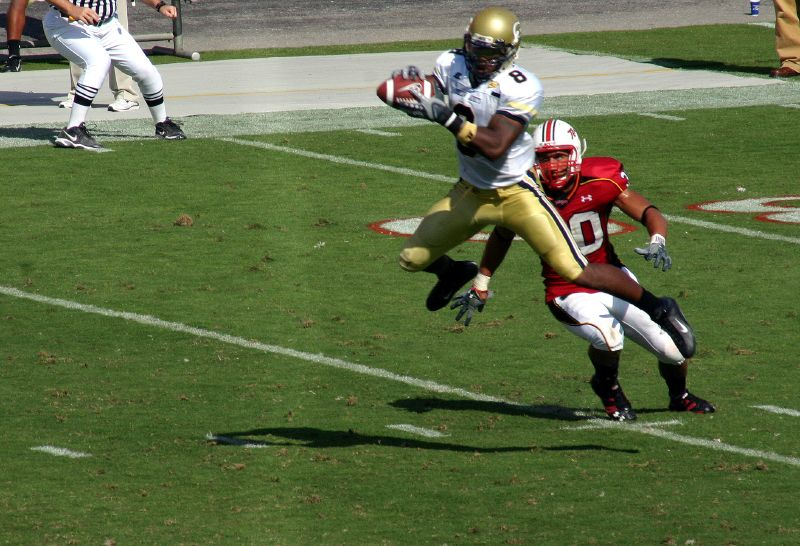
Thomas catches a pass in a 2007 game against Maryland.

Thomas chose to attend the Georgia Institute of Technology (Georgia Tech) where he majored in management. Under Yellow Jackets head coach Chan Gailey, Thomas sat out the 2006 season as a redshirt freshman.

Thomas made his collegiate debut in the 33–3 victory over Notre Dame, recording a single reception for nine yards. He scored his first collegiate touchdown on a 56-yard pass from Taylor Bennett in the Yellow Jackets' fourth game against Virginia. In the next game against Maryland, Thomas recorded his best statistical game of the season with nine receptions for 139 yards and a touchdown during the narrow 28–26 loss. During the 2007 Humanitarian Bowl, he had four receptions for 69 yards and a touchdown in the 40–28 loss to Fresno State. The Sporting News named Thomas to its freshman All-Atlantic Coast Conference (ACC) first team and a freshman All-America honorable mention.

In 2007, Thomas saw action in all 13 games including 10 starts, and recorded 35 receptions for 558 yards, which ranked second on the team behind Greg Smith's 588 yards. Thomas also led the team in receiving touchdowns with four.

=== 2008 season ===
In 2008, Paul Johnson was hired as the head coach and implemented the run-heavy triple option offense. Thomas considered transferring but decided against doing so. During the season, he recorded 39 receptions for 627 yards and three touchdowns as the leading receiver. Despite playing in a heavily run-oriented system, as one of the team's few experienced players, Thomas recorded relatively high numbers for the Yellow Jackets. Still, compared with other receivers in the Atlantic Coast Conference Thomas's statistics were much smaller. He said, "Sometimes I think about [not getting many passes], but most of the time I just want to win." Thomas's mark was the best of any wide receiver from the school since Calvin Johnson had 1,202 yards in 2006. In the 27–0 victory over Duke on October 4, he caught nine receptions for 230 yards, the second-most in a single game in school history.

=== 2009 season ===
Thomas began his senior season strong with four receptions for 101 yards in a 37–17 victory over Jacksonville State. In the third game, he recorded six receptions for 133 yards and a touchdown in the 33–17 loss to Miami. On October 3 against Mississippi State, Thomas had eight receptions for 174 yards and a touchdown in the 42–31 victory. On November 28, in the rivalry game against Georgia, he caught five passes for 127 yards and a touchdown in the 30–24 loss. Georgia Tech finished the regular season with a 10–2 record and qualified for the ACC Championship Game against Clemson. In the 39–34 victory, Thomas had a 70-yard touchdown reception. The Yellow Jackets qualified for the Orange Bowl. Thomas played in the game against Iowa but did not record any statistics in his final collegiate game.

Overall in 2009, during his redshirt junior year at Georgia Tech, Thomas had a breakout season with 46 receptions for 1,154 yards and eight touchdowns. This earned him First-Team All-ACC honors. He finished his collegiate career with 120 catches for a conference-leading 2,339 yards and 14 touchdowns.

Many draft experts had Thomas gaining momentum with NFL scouts going into the last couple weeks leading up to the draft and most had him as the number one or two-rated wide receiver along with Dez Bryant in the 2010 NFL draft, including Sporting News. On January 8, 2010, he declared for the draft.

== Professional career ==
=== Pre-draft ===
Pre-draft measurables
Height	Weight	Arm length	Hand span	Wonderlic
6 ft 3 1/4 in (1.91 m)	224 lb (102 kg)	33 in (0.84 m)	10 1/2 in (0.27 m)	34
All values from NFL Combine

Before the combine, Thomas broke his foot and was unable to participate in combine drills as a result. Thomas scored second highest among wide receivers with 34 on the Wonderlic test, second only to friend, fellow wide receiver, and future teammate Eric Decker, who had the highest score in the Combine with 43.

=== Denver Broncos ===
==== 2010 season ====
The Denver Broncos selected Thomas in the first round (22nd overall) in the 2010 NFL draft. He was the first wide receiver to be chosen that year. On July 31, 2010, the Broncos signed him to a five-year, $12.155 million contract with $9.35 million guaranteed.

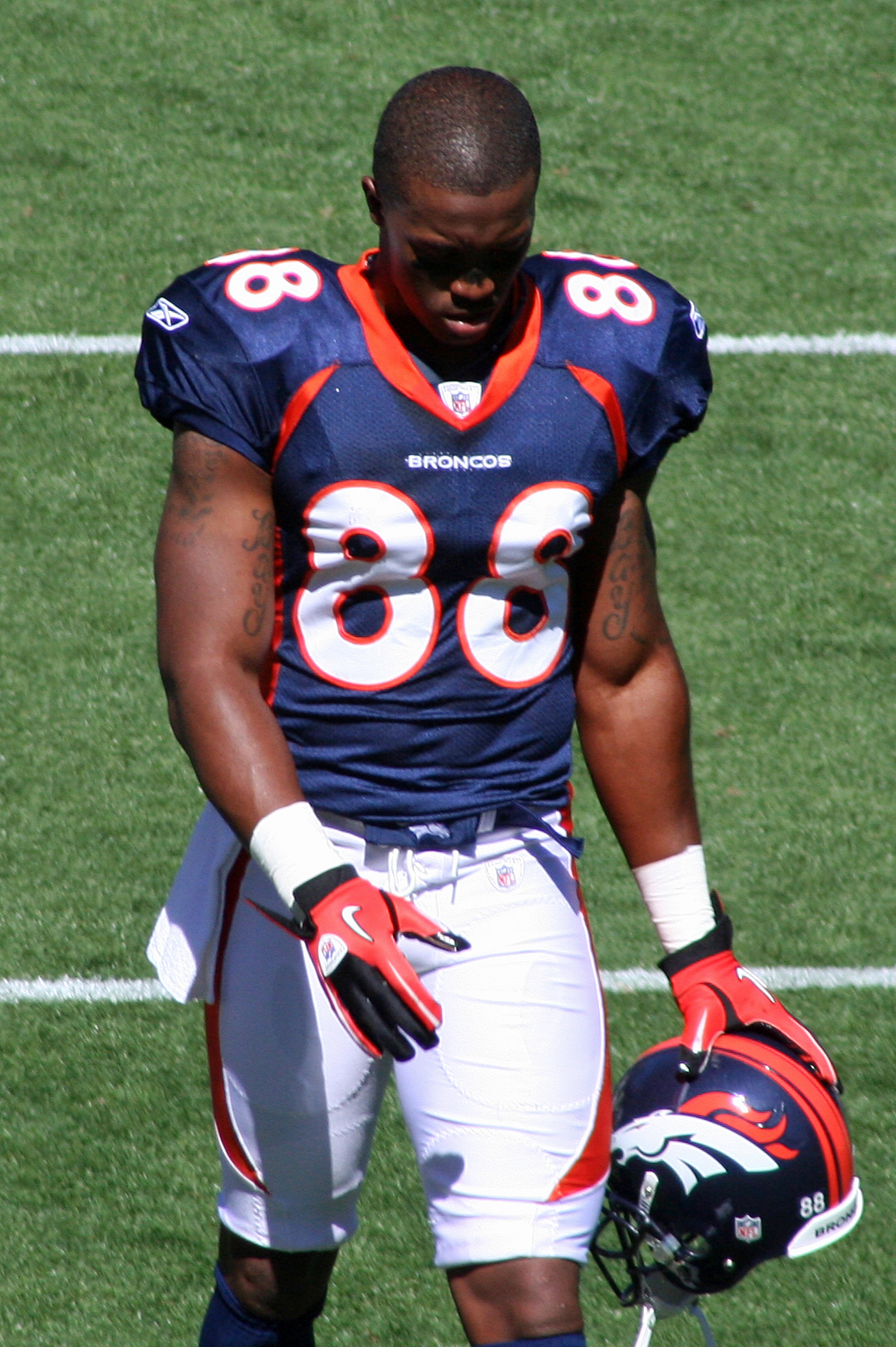
Thomas in 2010

In his NFL debut, Thomas had eight receptions for 97 yards and a touchdown as the Broncos defeated the Seattle Seahawks by a score of 31–14. His first career touchdown reception came on a 21-yard reception from quarterback Kyle Orton. Thomas was just the ninth player since 1970 to record at least eight catches in his first game. Thomas had the second-most catches by a rookie in franchise history, trailing only Eddie Royal, who had nine in a game against the Oakland Raiders in 2008. The highlight of Thomas' season came when he beat All-Pro cornerback Darrelle Revis for a 17-yard touchdown when the Broncos hosted the New York Jets in a 24–20 loss in Week 6 on October 17.

Thomas was plagued by injuries as a rookie. He first missed playing time due to a forearm injury and then a concussion; an ankle injury rendered him inactive for five more games late in the season.

Thomas finished his rookie year with 22 receptions for 283 yards and two touchdowns.

==== 2011 season ====
On February 10, 2011, it was announced that Thomas tore his Achilles tendon while working out and was expected to miss a majority, if not the entirety, of the 2011 season. However, he was surprisingly activated from the Physically Unable to Perform List prior to the start of the season. Broncos general manager Brian Xanders said that Demaryius had responded to rehab well and was "ready to go." Unfortunately, during his first practice back, Thomas broke his left pinkie finger and missed the first five games of the season.

Thomas made his season debut during Week 7 against the Miami Dolphins. He linked up with quarterback Tim Tebow on a five-yard reception for the Broncos' first score of the game. Denver went on to win by a score of 18–15 in overtime. Despite this early promise, Thomas only had four receptions for 76 yards in the next five games as the Broncos moved towards a run-heavy option offense. He broke his leg during Week 13 against the Minnesota Vikings. In that game, Thomas recorded 144 yards and two touchdowns on four receptions. Thomas ended the season strongly, emerging as Tebow's favorite receiver and setting a franchise record by leading the Broncos in both receiving and targets over the final seven games.

In the first round of the playoffs, Thomas played very well in what became known as the 3:16 game. On January 8, 2012, in the Wild Card Round, Thomas caught the game-winning, 80-yard touchdown pass from Tebow on the opening play of overtime to beat the Pittsburgh Steelers by a score of 29–23. The victory occurred in the first non-sudden death playoff game in NFL history. Prior to this game, if the first team scored a field goal, the game would have ended. The rule was changed to where only a safety or a touchdown would end the game before both teams could possess the ball. However, the new rules were not applied as Thomas's touchdown still marked the end of the game. The entire play took 10 seconds, and is the fastest ending to an overtime in NFL history to date. The touchdown was the longest playoff overtime score in NFL history. Thomas ended with a stat-line of four receptions for 204 yards and a touchdown in his playoff debut. It marked the most receiving yards by a Bronco in playoff history and the second-highest receiving average (51.0) in a single game in NFL annals. Thomas had six receptions for 93 yards the following week in the Divisional Round 45–10 loss to the New England Patriots.

Thomas finished his second professional season with 32 receptions for 551 yards and four touchdowns.

==== 2012 season ====
Thomas was coming off surgery to remove pins in his left pinkie when quarterback Peyton Manning signed with the Broncos during the 2012 offseason. This meant that, unlike fellow receiver Eric Decker, Thomas was unable to participate in workouts with Manning. However, Thomas made an effort to improve his route-running and quickly caught up. Manning noted during training camp that Thomas' "size, strength and speed just allow you to do certain things with him that other players just can't do."

Despite reports describing the connection between Thomas and Manning as "balky", Thomas found success again in the Broncos' first game of the season against the Pittsburgh Steelers. Down 13–7, Thomas, in a move reminiscent of his game-winning touchdown in the playoffs, burned the Steelers with a 71-yard catch-and-run. The touchdown was notable because it was the first touchdown Manning had thrown in the NFL for a team other than the Indianapolis Colts, and it was also the 400th of Manning's career, making Manning just the third player in NFL history to reach that milestone. Thomas finished the game with five receptions for 110 yards and the aforementioned touchdown.

Thomas set regular-season career highs in both catches, with nine, and receiving yards, with 180, in the road loss to the New England Patriots on October 7, 2012. During Week 8 against the New Orleans Saints, he had seven receptions for 137 yards and a touchdown in the 34–14 victory. He tied his career high of nine catches in games against the Carolina Panthers in Week 10 and the Cleveland Browns in Week 16. Thomas registered three catches for 37 yards and a touchdown in the Broncos' 2OT Divisional Round loss to the Baltimore Ravens in the playoffs.

Thomas had a breakout year in 2012, recording 94 receptions for 1,434 yards and 10 touchdowns. He led the team in targets, receptions, and yards, and ranked eighth in the league in receptions, fourth in yards, and seventh in touchdowns. Thomas was selected to his first Pro Bowl in the 2012 season after receiver Wes Welker withdrew due to injury. He was ranked 68th by his fellow players on the NFL Top 100 Players of 2013 list.

==== 2013 season ====
Starting the season strong, Thomas had five receptions for 161 yards and two touchdowns in a Week 1 victory over Baltimore Ravens. As he had done in Week 1 of the 2012 season, Thomas took a screen pass for a 78-yard touchdown. This was quarterback Peyton Manning's seventh touchdown pass of the game, which tied him with five other quarterbacks for the most in a single game in NFL history. Thomas' 161 receiving yards were the second-most in franchise history for a season-opening game, trailing only Shannon Sharpe's 180 in the Broncos' 1995 regular season opener. During Week 4, Thomas recorded his first multi-touchdown performance of the season with two against the Philadelphia Eagles in the 52–20 victory. He received AFC Offensive Player of the Week honors for the first time in his career in the Broncos' Week 10 victory over the San Diego Chargers. Thomas posted seven receptions for 108 yards and three touchdowns. In the next game against the Kansas City Chiefs, he had five receptions for 121 yards during the 27–17 victory. During Week 16 against the Houston Texans, Thomas recorded eight receptions for 123 yards and a touchdown in the 37–13 victory. In the regular season finale against the Oakland Raiders, he caught six passes for 113 yards and two touchdowns during the 34–14 victory.

Thomas total contributions to the Broncos' historic season on offense were significant. He caught Manning's 55th touchdown, which set an NFL record for the most touchdowns thrown by a quarterback in a single season. Manning also broke the single season passing yardage mark on that same pass to Thomas. His 633 yards after catch was second in the entire league. Manning, who said that Thomas "got great speed and power and it's fun to watch once he gets it in his hands", attributed part of Thomas' success to "all the runs he had to practice at Georgia Tech".

Recording 92 receptions for 1,430 yards and 14 touchdowns during the regular season, Thomas ranked ninth in the league for receptions, fourth in yards, and second in touchdowns. He finished second in the NFL to Jimmy Graham in receiving touchdowns, but his 14 touchdowns led all wide receivers. Thomas led the team in targets, receptions, and yards for the second consecutive year. He also led the team in receiving touchdowns.

Thomas was again voted to the Pro Bowl in 2013. He was selected to the Associated Press All-Pro team for the first time in his career.

Thomas averaged 9.33 receptions and 102 yards per game during the 2013–14 playoffs, including the Super Bowl. He also scored a touchdown in every playoff game. In the Divisional Round against the San Diego Chargers, Thomas recorded eight receptions for 54 yards and a touchdown in the 24–17 victory. During the AFC Championship Game against the New England Patriots, he had seven receptions for 134 yards and a touchdown in the 26–16 victory. Thomas set a then NFL record for most catches in a Super Bowl game by a player (James White broke the record in Super Bowl LI with 14 catches), despite reportedly playing most of the game with a separated shoulder. In Super Bowl XLVIII, Thomas had a then-Super Bowl record 13 receptions for 118 yards and a touchdown, but the Broncos lost 43–8 to the Seattle Seahawks. He was ranked 44th by his peers on the NFL Top 100 Players of 2014 list.

==== 2014 season ====
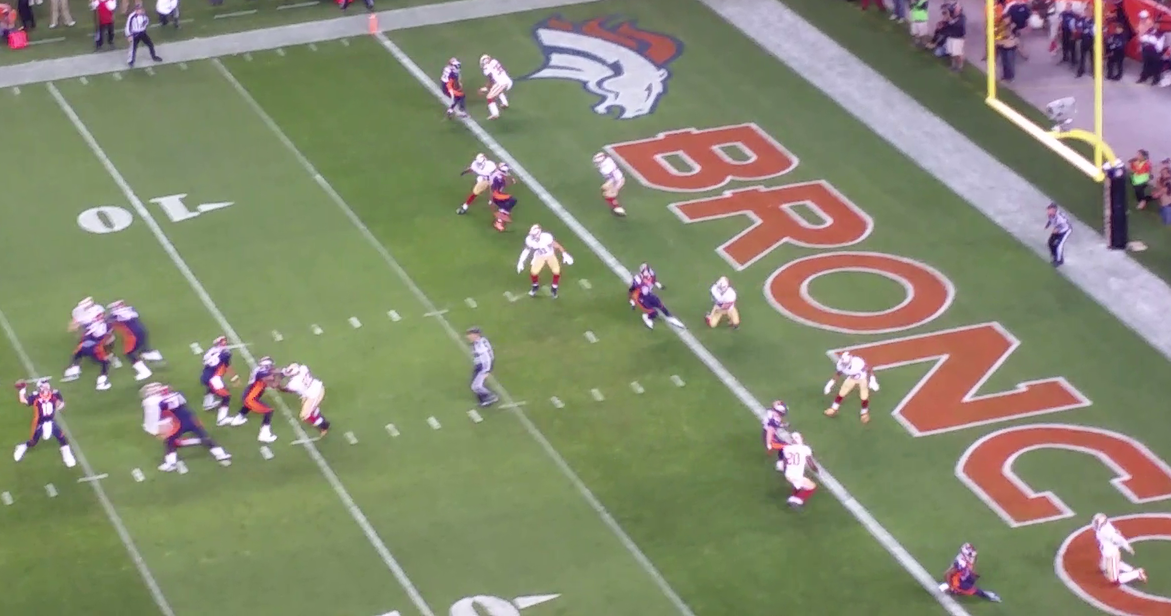
Manning (left) throwing his record-breaking touchdown pass #509 to Demaryius Thomas (lower right), October 19, 2014

Thomas started the 2014 season quietly with 13 receptions for 142 yards and a touchdown combined in the first three games, a 2–1 stretch for Broncos. On October 5, 2014, against the Arizona Cardinals, Thomas made eight receptions for 226 yards, breaking the franchise record for receiving yards in a single game held by Shannon Sharpe, and two touchdowns, of which one went for a career-high 86 yards. He earned his second AFC Offensive Player of the Week honor for his performance against the Cardinals. Two weeks later against the San Francisco 49ers, Thomas caught Peyton Manning's all-time record-breaking 509th touchdown pass. The historic touchdown reception was part of a day where Thomas had eight receptions for 171 yards and two touchdowns in the 42–17 victory.

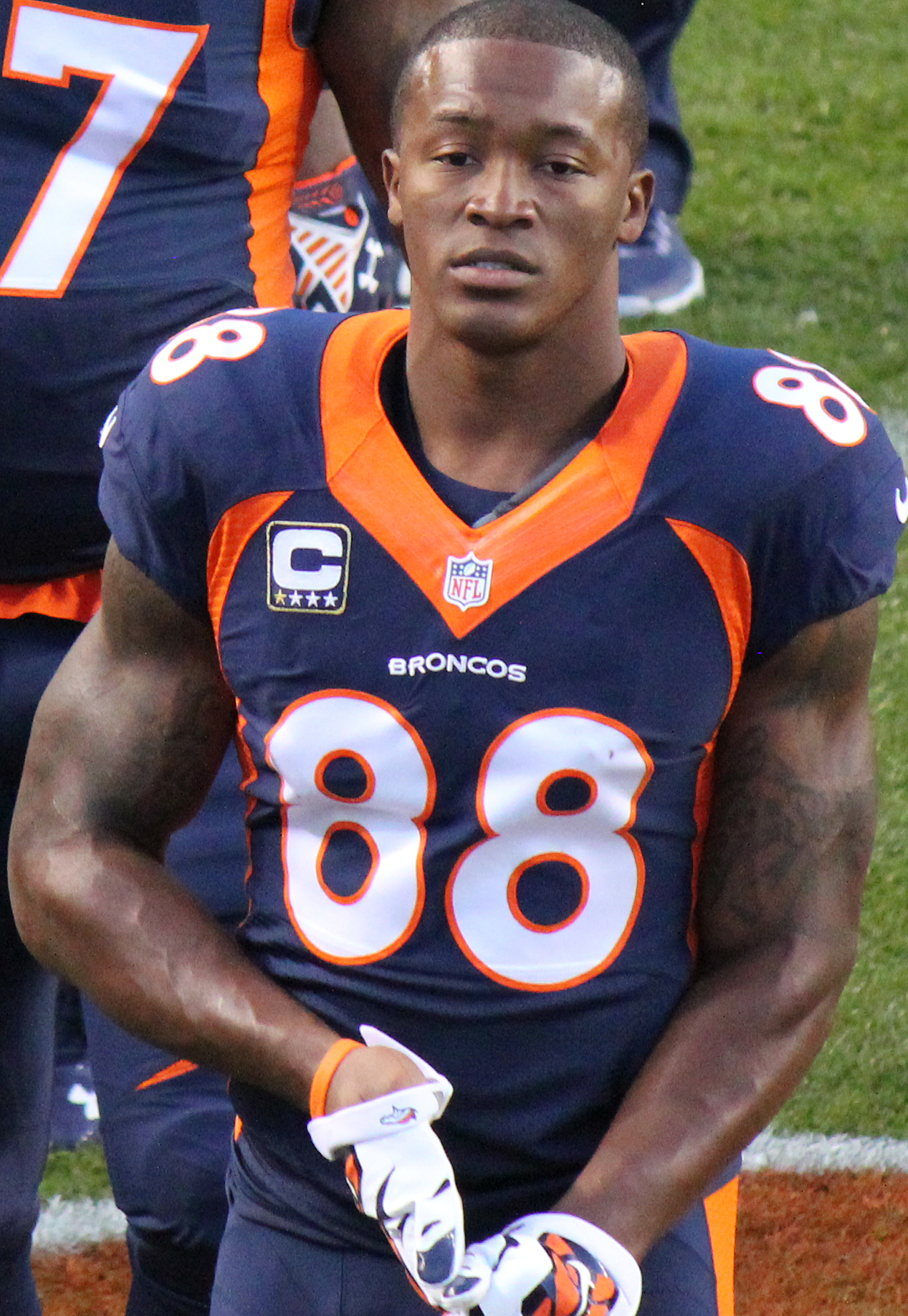
Thomas in 2014

During Week 9 against the New England Patriots, Thomas had seven receptions for 127 yards. Two weeks later against the St. Louis Rams, he caught seven passes for 103 yards, extending his own franchise record for consecutive 100 yard games to seven, in the 22–7 loss. Thomas finished second only to Pittsburgh's Antonio Brown in receiving yards for the 2014 season, with a career-high 1,619 yards off a career-high 111 catches. He was named to his third consecutive Pro Bowl for the 2014 season. Thomas was ranked 20th by his fellow players on the NFL Top 100 Players of 2015 list.

The Broncos finished with a 12–4 record and played against the Indianapolis Colts in the Divisional Round. He had five receptions for 59 yards and a touchdown in the 24–13 loss.

==== 2015 season ====
On March 3, 2015, the Broncos placed the franchise tag ($12.823 million) on Thomas. Reports indicated that the tag was non-exclusive, which meant that Thomas could negotiate with other teams, and the Broncos held the right to match any offer, or receive two first-round picks as compensation.

On July 15, Thomas signed a five-year, $70 million contract extension with the Broncos, just hours before the deadline for franchise players. The deal was similar in structure to Dez Bryant's contract extension with the Dallas Cowboys. Bryant was also franchise tagged and signed just hours before Thomas. He was also drafted just two picks after Thomas, going 24th overall in the 2010 NFL draft. Between Peyton Manning struggling with a plantar fasciitis injury and Brock Osweiler never having a career start before the season, Thomas' production dropped, but he still had 105 receptions for 1,304 yards and six touchdowns.

After a 60-yard performance in the 19–13 victory over the Baltimore Ravens in the season opener, Thomas recorded eight receptions for 116 yards in the 31–24 Thursday Night Football victory over the Kansas City Chiefs in Week 2. During a Week 6 overtime victory over the Cleveland Browns, he had 10 receptions for 111 yards. Thomas followed that up with eight receptions for 168 yards in the 29–10 victory over the Green Bay Packers in Week 8. Following a Week 10 loss to the Kansas City Chiefs, where Peyton Manning was benched for a stint in favor of Brock Osweiler, Thomas's production slightly dropped. From Weeks 10 to 15, he averaged 61.8 yards per game but scored four receiving touchdowns in that stretch. In a Week 15 loss to the Pittsburgh Steelers, he recorded his only game of the 2015 season with two receiving touchdowns. During the regular season finale, a 27–20 victory over the San Diego Chargers, he had five receptions for 117 yards and a 72-yard touchdown from Osweiler on the second play from scrimmage. The game saw Manning return from the bench to help edge the Broncos to victory.

The Broncos finished the season with a 12–4 record and earned the #1-seed in the AFC. They defeated the Pittsburgh Steelers in the Divisional Round by a score of 23–16 and the New England Patriots in the AFC Championship Game by a score of 20–18 to make it to Super Bowl 50, where the Broncos defeated the Carolina Panthers by a score of 24–10 to give Thomas his first Super Bowl title. Thomas had one catch for eight yards in the Super Bowl. He was ranked 62nd by his fellow players on the NFL Top 100 Players of 2015 list.

==== 2016 season ====
Going into the 2016 season, the Broncos lost both quarterbacks that contributed to the team's Super Bowl run; Manning to retirement, and Brock Osweiler to the Houston Texans. Before the 2016 season started, Trevor Siemian was named the starter for the Broncos.

Thomas recorded six receptions for 100 yards and a touchdown in a Week 3 29–17 victory over the Cincinnati Bengals. In the next two games, against the Tampa Bay Buccaneers and Atlanta Falcons, he scored receiving touchdowns to make three consecutive games in which he recorded a score. During Week 14 against the Tennessee Titans, Thomas recorded 10 receptions for 126 yards in the 13–10 road loss.

After his fifth consecutive 1,000-yard season, Thomas was selected to the 2017 Pro Bowl. He played in the game and recorded two receptions for 37 yards in the 20–13 victory for the AFC. Thomas finished the 2016 season with 90 receptions for 1,083 yards and five touchdowns.

==== 2017 season ====
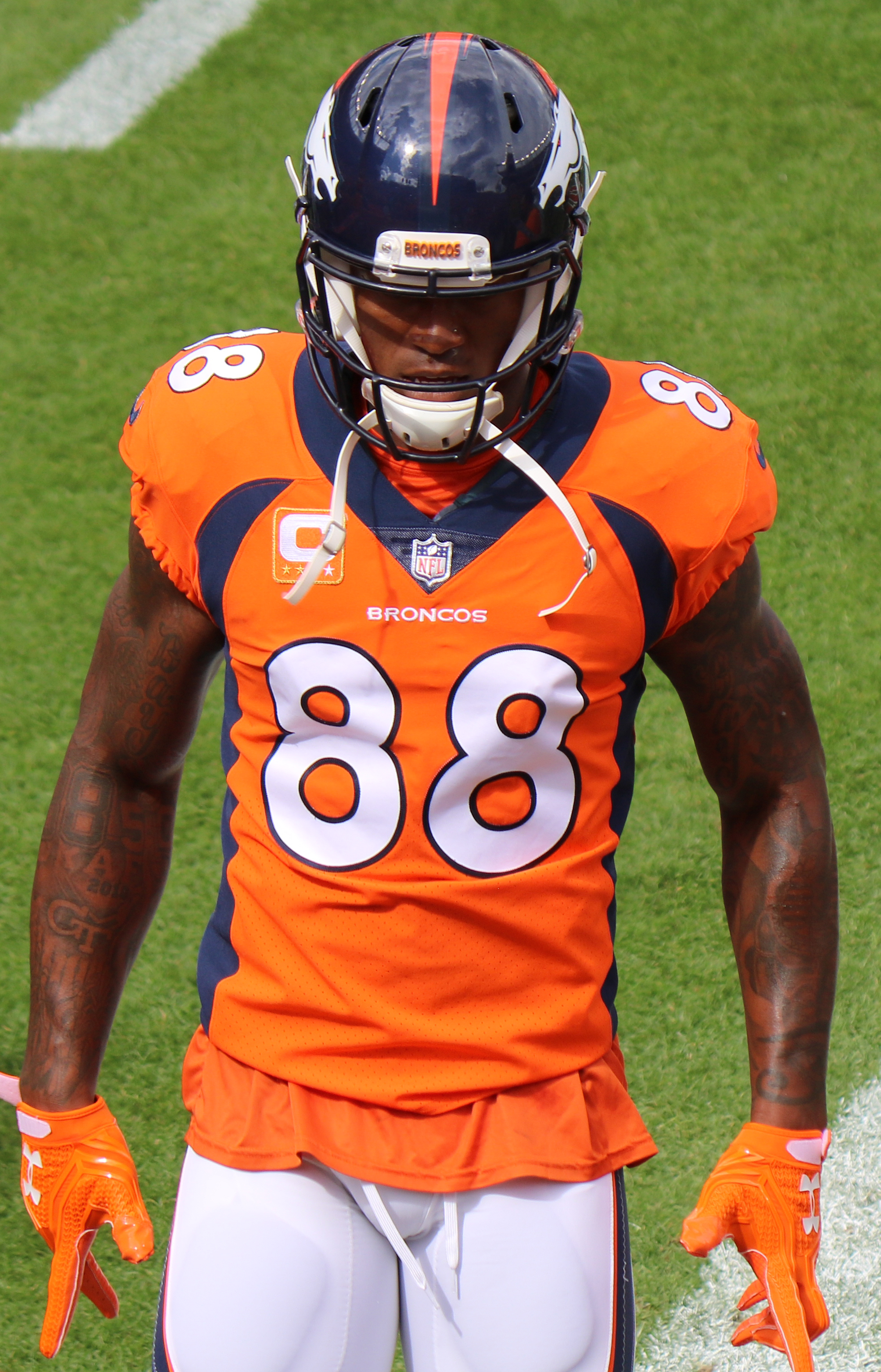
Thomas in 2017

Thomas remained a strong presence for the Broncos despite inconsistent quarterback play in 2017. His best statistical game came in Week 6 against the New York Giants on NBC Sunday Night Football. In the 23–10 loss, he had 10 receptions for 133 yards. From Weeks 8 to 10, he recorded three consecutive games with a receiving touchdown respectively against the Philadelphia Eagles, New England Patriots, and Cincinnati Bengals.

Thomas led the team with 83 receptions for 949 yards and five touchdowns as the Broncos struggled to a 5–11 record.

==== 2018 season ====
Going into the 2018 season, the Broncos had a new quarterback in Case Keenum. In the first four games of the season, Thomas totaled 20 receptions for 168 yards and a touchdown. During Week 5, he had his best output of the season to that point with five receptions for 105 yards and a touchdown in a 34–16 loss to the New York Jets.

=== Houston Texans ===
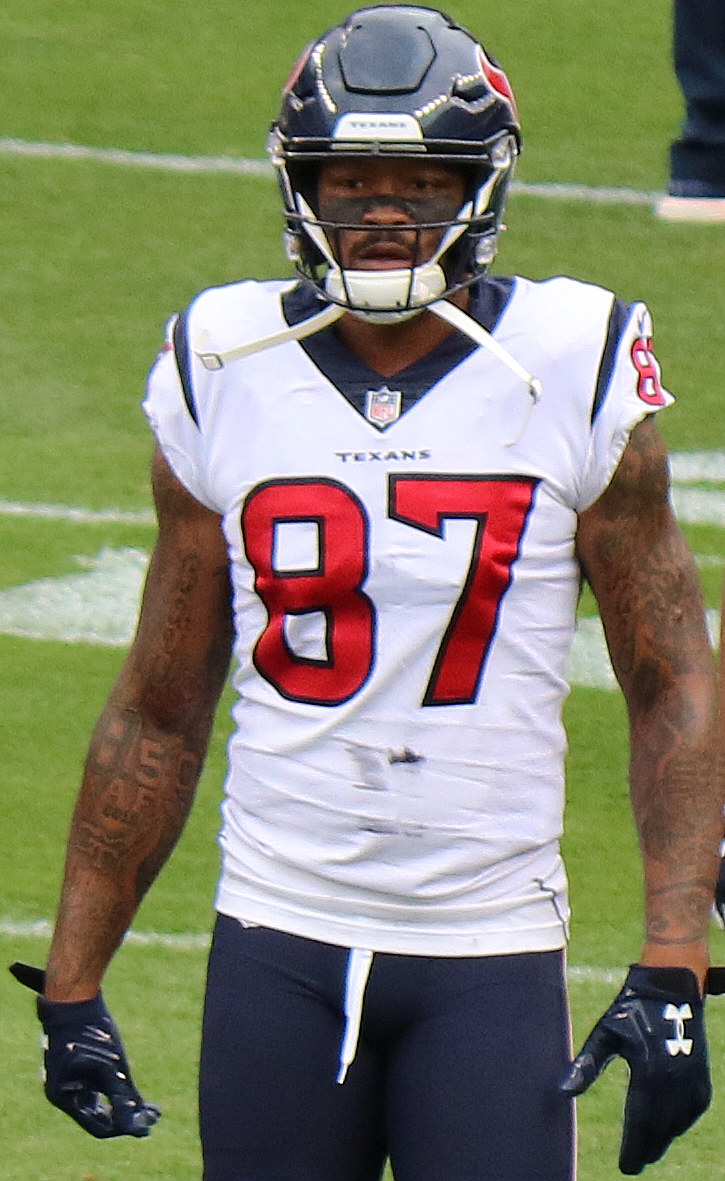
Thomas in 2018

On October 30, 2018, the Broncos traded Thomas and a seventh round pick in the 2019 NFL draft to the Houston Texans for a fourth and seventh round pick in the 2019 NFL Draft.

In his Texans debut, Thomas had three receptions for 61 yards in the narrow 19–17 road victory over the Broncos, his former team. Three weeks later against the Tennessee Titans, Thomas recorded four receptions for 38 yards and two touchdowns in the 34–17 victory.

During Week 16, Thomas was carted off the field in the second half of a narrow 32–30 road loss to the Philadelphia Eagles with an apparent Achilles injury. It was revealed that he suffered a torn Achilles, and Thomas was placed on injured reserve on December 24, 2018.

In the 2018 season, combined with his time with the Broncos and Texans, Thomas recorded 59 receptions for 677 yards and five touchdowns.

On February 12, 2019, Thomas was released by the Texans.

=== New England Patriots ===
On April 16, 2019, Thomas signed a one-year contract with the New England Patriots. He was released during final roster cuts on August 31, but was re-signed to a one-year contract three days later. However, Thomas never played a regular-season game for the team.

=== New York Jets ===
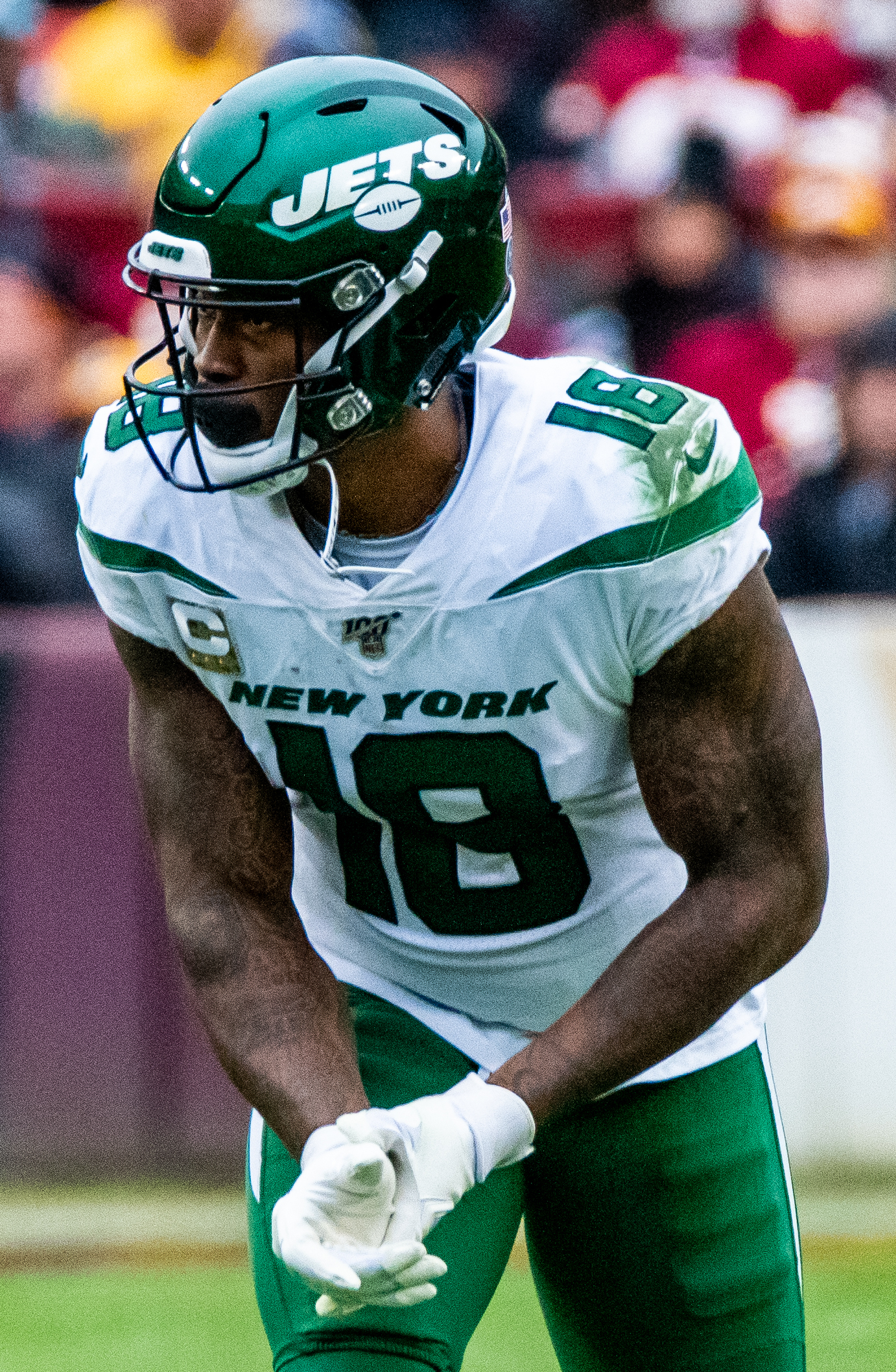
Thomas in 2019

On September 10, 2019, Thomas was traded to the New York Jets in exchange for a sixth-round pick in the 2021 NFL draft.

Thomas made his Jets debut in a Week 2 loss to the Cleveland Browns. He scored his first and only touchdown as a Jet on a 14-yard pass from Sam Darnold during a narrow 22–21 victory over the Miami Dolphins in Week 14.

In the 2019 season, Thomas appeared in 11 games and recorded 36 receptions for 433 yards and a touchdown.

=== Retirement ===
Thomas announced his retirement on June 28, 2021.

== Career statistics ==
Legend
	Won the Super Bowl
**Bold**	Career high

=== NFL ===
==== Regular season ====
Year	Team	Games		Receiving					Rushing					Fumbles	
Year	Team	GP	GS	Rec	Yds	Avg	Lng	TD	Att	Yds	Avg	Lng	TD	Fum	Lost
2010	DEN	10	2	22	283	12.9	31	2	**2**	1	0.5	1	0	**3**	2
2011	DEN	11	5	32	551	**17.2**	47	4	1	**5**	**5.0**	**5**	0	0	0
2012	DEN	16	16	94	1,434	15.3	71T	10	0	0	0.0	0	0	**3**	**3**
2013	DEN	16	16	92	1,430	15.5	78T	**14**	0	0	0.0	0	0	1	0
2014	DEN	16	16	**111**	**1,619**	14.9	**86T**	11	0	0	0.0	0	0	0	0
2015	DEN	16	16	105	1,304	12.4	72T	6	0	0	0.0	0	0	2	2
2016	DEN	16	16	90	1,083	12.0	55T	5	0	0	0.0	0	0	2	2
2017	DEN	16	16	83	949	11.4	40	5	0	0	0.0	0	0	1	1
2018	DEN	8	8	36	402	11.2	45	3	0	0	0.0	0	0	0	0
2018	HOU	7	7	23	275	12.0	31	2	0	0	0.0	0	0	0	0
2019	NYJ	11	10	36	433	12.0	47	1	0	0	0.0	0	0	0	0
Career		143	128	724	9,763	13.5	86T	63	3	6	2.0	5	0	12	10

==== Postseason ====
Year	Team	Games		Receiving					Rushing					Fumbles	
Year	Team	GP	GS	Rec	Yds	Avg	Lng	TD	Att	Yds	Avg	Lng	TD	Fum	Lost
2011	DEN	2	2	10	297	**29.7**	**80T**	1	0	0	0.0	0	0	0	0
2012	DEN	1	1	3	37	12.3	17T	1	0	0	0.0	0	0	0	0
2013	DEN	3	3	**28**	**306**	10.9	30	**3**	0	0	0.0	0	0	**1**	**1**
2014	DEN	1	1	5	59	11.8	24	1	0	0	0.0	0	0	0	0
2015	DEN	3	3	7	60	8.6	15	0	0	0	0.0	0	0	0	0
2018	HOU	0	0	Did not play due to injury											
Career		10	10	53	759	14.3	80T	6	0	0	0.0	0	0	1	1

=== College ===
Season	Team	GP	Rec	Yds	Avg	TD
2007	Georgia Tech	13	35	558	15.9	4
2008	Georgia Tech	12	39	627	16.1	3
2009	Georgia Tech	14	**46**	**1,154**	**25.1**	**8**
Career		39	120	2,339	19.5	15

== Career highlights ==
=== Awards and honors ===
NFL

- Super Bowl champion (50)
- 2× Second-team All-Pro (2013, 2014)
- 5× Pro Bowl (2012–2016)
- Denver Broncos Ring of Fame
- 5× NFL Top 100 — 68th (2013), 49th (2014), 20th (2015), 62nd (2016), 57th (2017)

College

- Third-team All-American (2009)
- First-team All-ACC (2009)

=== Broncos franchise records ===
- Receptions, playoff career: 54
- Receptions, playoff season: 28 (2013)
- Receptions, playoff game: 13 (February 2, 2014, against the Seattle Seahawks in Super Bowl XLVIII; tied with Shannon Sharpe)
- Receiving yards, regular season: 1,619 (2014)
- Receiving yards in a single game, regular season: 226 (October 5, 2014, against the Arizona Cardinals)
- Receiving yards in a single game, playoffs: 204 (January 8, 2012, against the Pittsburgh Steelers)
- Receiving yards, playoff season: 306 (2013)
- Receiving touchdowns in a regular season: 14 (2013; tied with Anthony Miller in 1995)
- Receiving touchdowns in a playoff season: 3 (2013)
- Receiving touchdowns in a playoff career: 6 (tied with Rod Smith)
- Games with at least 100 receiving yards, career: 33
- Most games with at least 100 receiving yards, single season: 10 (2014)
- Most games with at least two receiving touchdowns: 10 (tied with Ed McCaffrey)
- Consecutive games with at least 100 receiving yards, season: 7 (2014)
- Consecutive with at least 100 receiving yards, playoffs: 2 (tied with Vance Johnson)
- Consecutive games with at least five receptions: 16 (2016)

== Personal life ==
Thomas was an evangelical Christian, and he frequently posted about his faith on his Twitter account. Thomas had a tattoo of a portrait of Jesus on his left arm bearing the phrase "Jesus Saves".

On July 15, 2016, Thomas was honored by the city council of Dublin, Georgia, which named the day as Demaryius Thomas Day.

== Death ==
On December 9, 2021, Thomas was discovered unconscious at his residence in Roswell, Georgia. He was later pronounced dead at age 33. The cause of death was believed to be a seizure, secondary to injuries Thomas suffered from years of football and a 2019 car crash. Police said that his death was attributed to a "medical issue".

After Thomas died, his brain was donated to Boston University for examination. It tested positive for chronic traumatic encephalopathy (CTE), a neurodegenerative condition associated with repeated head trauma. As of March 2023, he is one of at least 345 NFL players to be diagnosed after death with this disease.

== Legacy ==
Thomas is considered to be among the greatest wide receivers in Broncos franchise history, having the second-most career receiving yards with the Broncos of all time.

On the opening play of a game against the Detroit Lions on December 12, 2021, three days after Thomas' death, the Broncos commemorated him by lining up ten players instead of eleven and waiting for the clock to wind down. They received a delay of game penalty as a result, but Lions head coach Dan Campbell declined the penalty as a gesture of solidarity.

On May 27, 2025, the Broncos posthumously honored Thomas by announcing his induction into their Ring of Fame in his first year of eligibility. Thomas was officially inducted on October 19, 2025, during halftime of the Broncos' home game against the New York Giants. While shut out in the first three quarters, the Broncos would go on to score 33 points in the fourth quarter and defeat the Giants by a score of 33 to 32.
