= East Laurens High School =

Public high school in East Dublin, Georgia, United States

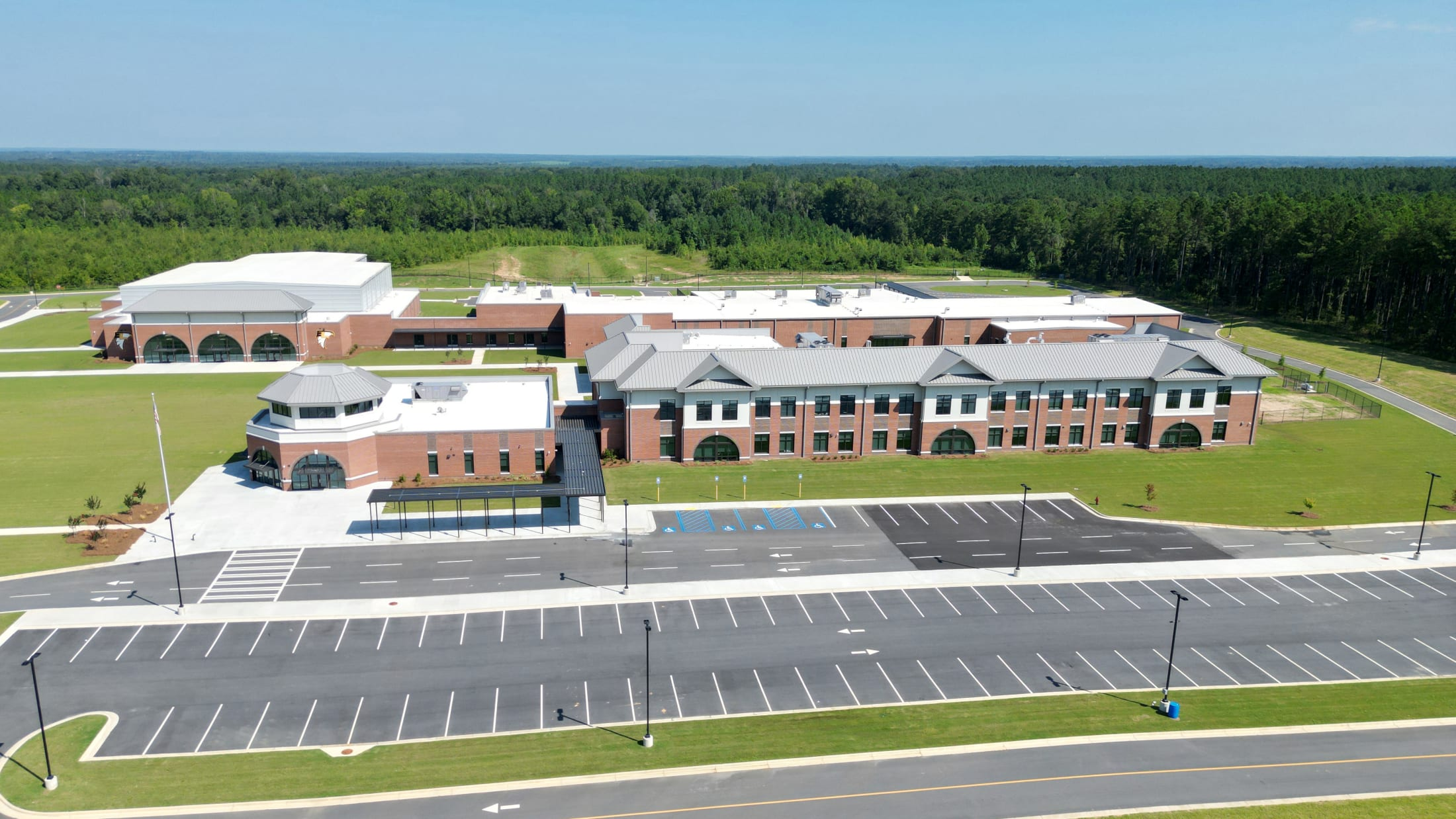

Location
- 1010 Highway 80 East; East Dublin, (Laurens County), Georgia 31027; United States; 32.566466°N 82.809882°W

Information
- School district: Laurens County School District
- Principal: Keldrick Burke
- Teaching staff: 49.50 FTE
- Grades: 9-12
- Enrollment: 636 (2023-2024)
- Student to teacher ratio: 12.85
- Colors: Black and gold
- Slogan: "Fearless Fighting Falcons"
- Fight song: "Fighting Falcons"
- Athletics: GHSA
- Athletics conference: 2A Sub-Region B
- Mascot: Falcon
- Team name: Falcons
- Rival: West Laurens High School
- Accreditation: Georgia Accrediting Commission
- Feeder schools: East Laurens Middle School
- Telephone: (478) 272–3144
- Fax: (478) 609-2175
- Website: http://elhs.lcboe.net/

East Laurens High School is a public high school located in East Dublin, Georgia, United States. The school is part of the Laurens County School District, which serves Laurens County.
