= Georgia State Route 199 =

State highway in Georgia, United States

State Route 199
- Georgia State Route 199 highlighted in red

Route information
- Maintained by GDOT
- Length: 26.9 mi (43.3 km)

Major junctions
- South end: US 221 / SR 56 north of Mount Vernon
- I-16 southeast of Dublin
- North end: SR 29 in East Dublin

Location
- Country: United States
- State: Georgia
- Counties: Montgomery, Treutlen, Laurens

Highway system
- Georgia State Highway System; Interstate; US; State; Special
← SR 198	→ SR 200

State Route 199 (SR 199) is a 26.9-mile-long (43.3 km) state highway in the east-central part of the U.S. state of Georgia. It is a southeast–northwest route through portions of Montgomery, Treutlen, and Laurens counties. It runs from a point north of Mount Vernon northwest to East Dublin.

== Route description ==
SR 199 begins at an intersection with US 221/SR 56, north of Mount Vernon, in Montgomery County. It heads northwest into Treutlen County, where it intersects SR 46 before meeting SR 199 Spur. Continuing northwest, SR 199 enters Laurens County and travels through rural areas before an interchange with Interstate 16 (I-16), southeast of Dublin. It meets its northern terminus, an intersection with SR 29 in East Dublin.

SR 199 is not part of the National Highway System, a system of roadways important to the nation's economy, defense, and mobility.

== Major intersections ==
County	Location	mi	km	Destinations	Notes
Montgomery		0.0	0.0	US 221 / SR 56 – Mount Vernon, Soperton	Southern terminus
Treutlen		7.4	11.9	SR 46 – Eastman, Soperton	
Treutlen	Lothair	8.4	13.5	SR 199 Spur south	Northern terminus of SR 199 Spur
Laurens		21.0	33.8	I-16 (Jim Gillis Historic Savannah Parkway / SR 404) – Macon, Savannah	I-16 exit 58
Laurens	East Dublin	26.9	43.3	SR 29 (Soperton Avenue) – Soperton	Northern terminus
1.000 mi = 1.609 km; 1.000 km = 0.621 mi

== Bannered route ==
State Route 199 Spur
- Location: Southwest of Lothair
- Length: 3.5 mi (5.6 km)

State Route 199 Spur (SR 199 Spur) is a 3.5-mile-long (5.6 km) spur route of SR 199 that exists entirely within the southwestern part of Treutlen County.

SR 199 Spur begins in a rural part of the county, at an intersection with Troup Road. It heads northeast and curves to the east and curves back to the northeast. It crosses over Red Bluff Creek before it meets its eastern terminus, an intersection with the SR 199 mainline in Lothair.

SR 199 Spur is not part of the National Highway System, a system of roadways important to the nation's economy, defense, and mobility.

The entire route is in Treutlen County.

Location	mi	km	Destinations	Notes
	0.0	0.0	Troup Road	Southern terminus
Lothair	3.5	5.6	SR 199 – Mount Vernon, Soperton, East Dublin	Northern terminus
1.000 mi = 1.609 km; 1.000 km = 0.621 mi
