= East Dublin, Georgia =

- City
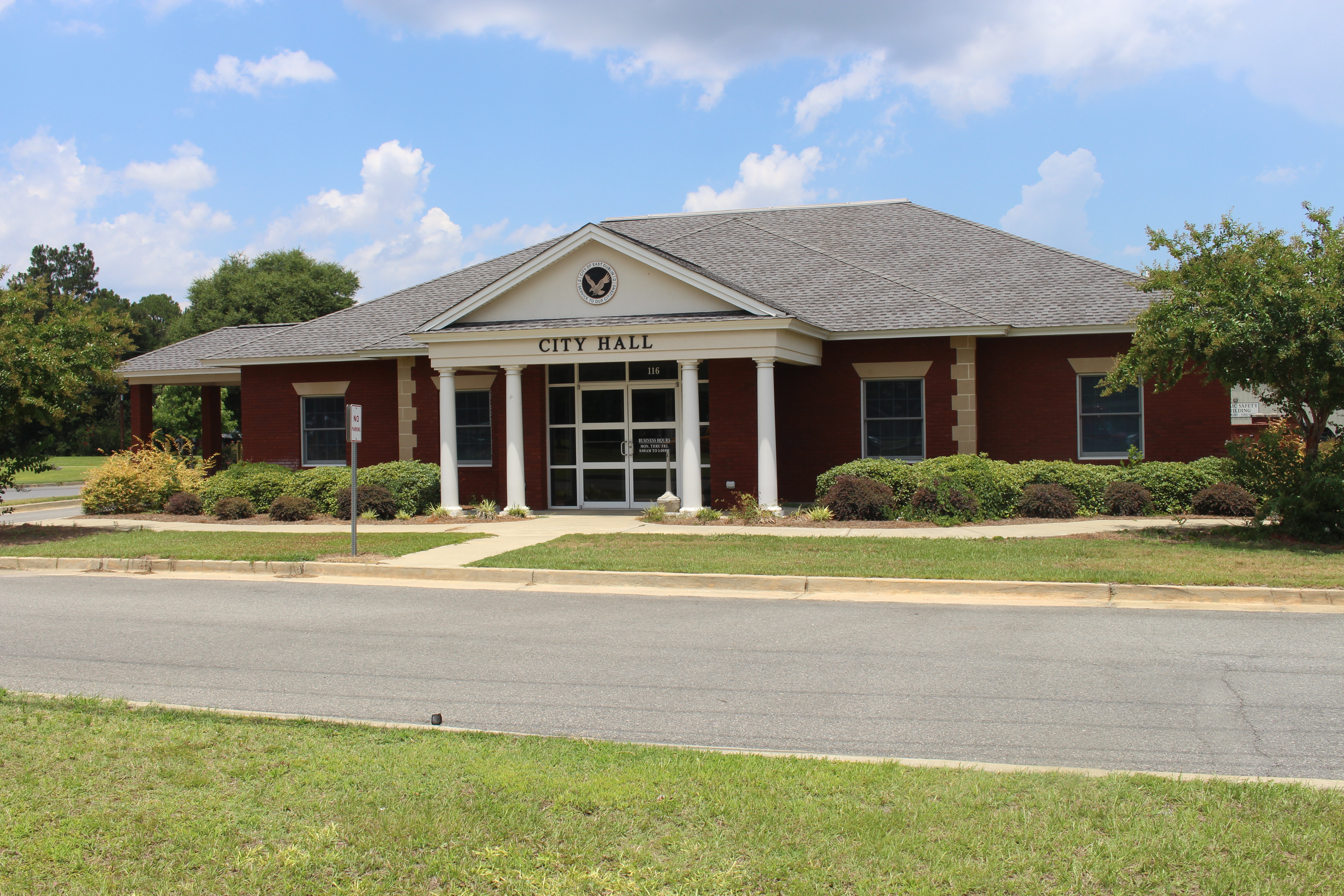
- East Dublin City Hall

- Location in Laurens County and the state of Georgia
- Coordinates: 32°33′3″N 82°52′7″W
- Country: United States
- State: Georgia
- County: Laurens

Area
  - Total: 4.41 sq mi (11.43 km^{2})
  - Land: 4.22 sq mi (10.93 km^{2})
  - Water: 0.20 sq mi (0.51 km^{2})
- Elevation: 249 ft (76 m)

Population (2020)
  - Total: 2,492
  - Density: 590.8/sq mi (228.09/km^{2})
- Time zone: UTC-5 (Eastern (EST))
  - Summer (DST): UTC-4 (EDT)
- ZIP code: 31027
- Area code: 478
- FIPS code: 13-25300
- GNIS feature ID: 0331618
- Website: cityofeastdublin.org

East Dublin is a city in Laurens County, Georgia, United States. The population was 2,492 in 2020.

== Geography ==
East Dublin is located in north-central Laurens County at 32°33′3″N 82°52′7″W (32.550854, -82.868661), on the east bank of the Oconee River. It is bordered to the west, across the river, by the city of Dublin, the Laurens county seat.

U.S. Routes 80 and 319 pass through East Dublin as Central Drive. US 80 leads east 33 miles (53 km) to Swainsboro, while US 319 leads northeast 16 miles (26 km) to Wrightsville. The two highways lead west together into Dublin. Interstate 16 passes 6 miles (10 km) south of East Dublin, with access from Exit 58 (State Route 199).

According to the United States Census Bureau, the city has a total area of 4.4 square miles (11.4 km^{2}), of which 4.2 square miles (10.9 km^{2}) are land and 0.19 square miles (0.5 km^{2}), or 4.46%, are water.

== Demographics ==
Historical population
| Census | Pop. | Note | %± |
|---|---|---|---|
| 1960 | 1,677 | | — |
| 1970 | 2,000 | | 19.3% |
| 1980 | 2,916 | | 45.8% |
| 1990 | 2,524 | | −13.4% |
| 2000 | 2,484 | | −1.6% |
| 2010 | 2,441 | | −1.7% |
| 2020 | 2,492 | | 2.1% |
U.S. Decennial Census

=== 2020 census ===
As of the 2020 census, East Dublin had a population of 2,492. The median age was 35.2 years. 28.6% of residents were under the age of 18 and 14.2% of residents were 65 years of age or older. For every 100 females there were 86.9 males, and for every 100 females age 18 and over there were 82.0 males age 18 and over.

95.6% of residents lived in urban areas, while 4.4% lived in rural areas.

There were 976 households and 643 families in East Dublin. Of households, 36.1% had children under the age of 18 living in them. Of all households, 29.7% were married-couple households, 20.8% were households with a male householder and no spouse or partner present, and 40.1% were households with a female householder and no spouse or partner present. About 30.9% of all households were made up of individuals, and 11.3% had someone living alone who was 65 years of age or older.

There were 1,156 housing units, of which 15.6% were vacant. The homeowner vacancy rate was 2.7% and the rental vacancy rate was 4.2%.

East Dublin racial composition as of 2020
| Race | Num. | Perc. |
|---|---|---|
| White (non-Hispanic) | 818 | 32.83% |
| Black or African American (non-Hispanic) | 1,497 | 60.07% |
| Native American | 2 | 0.08% |
| Asian | 6 | 0.24% |
| Pacific Islander | 1 | 0.04% |
| Other/Mixed | 98 | 3.93% |
| Hispanic or Latino | 70 | 2.81% |

== Education ==
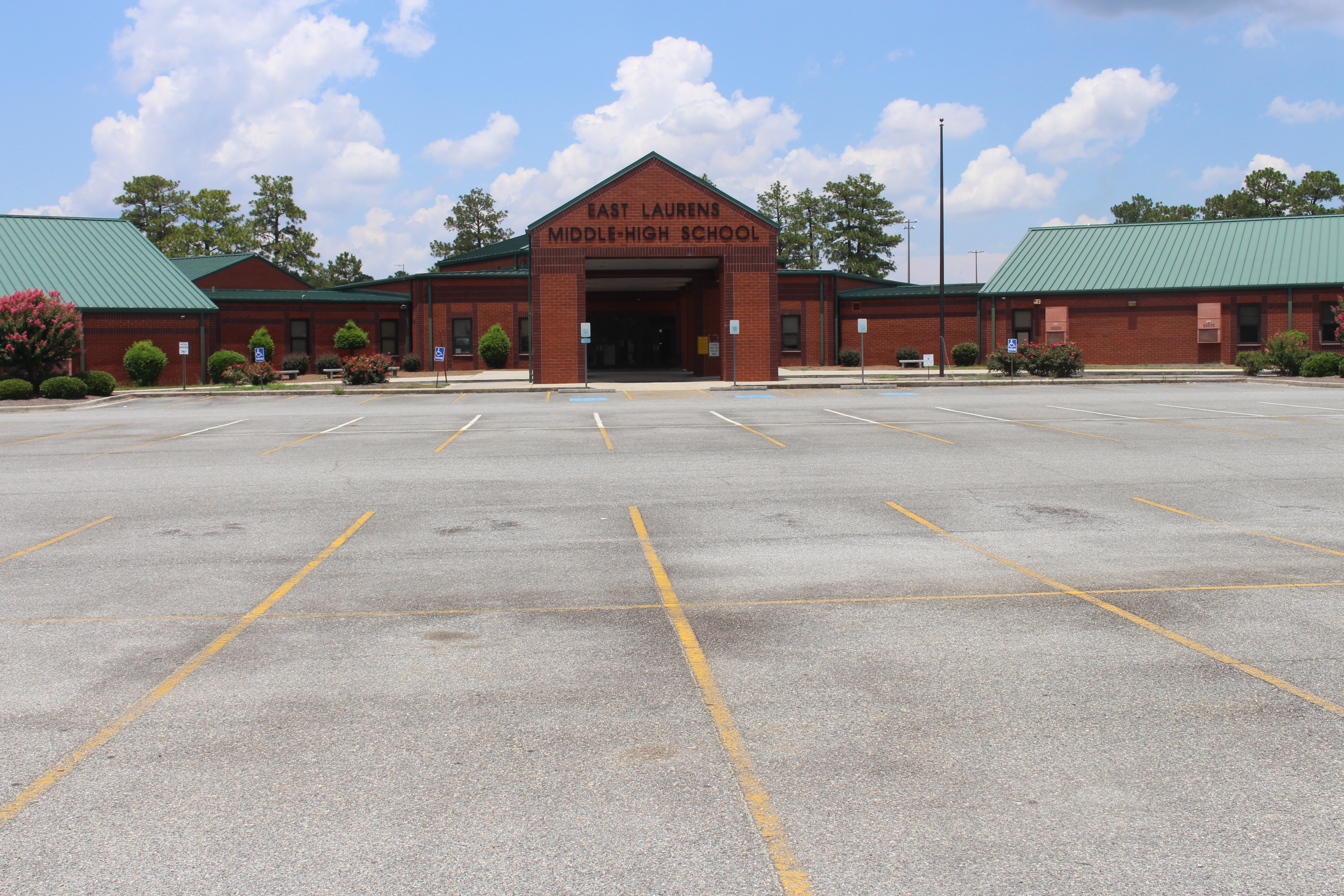
East Laurens Middle-High School

It is in the Laurens County School District:

- East Laurens Primary School
- East Laurens Elementary School
- East Laurens Middle School
- East Laurens High School
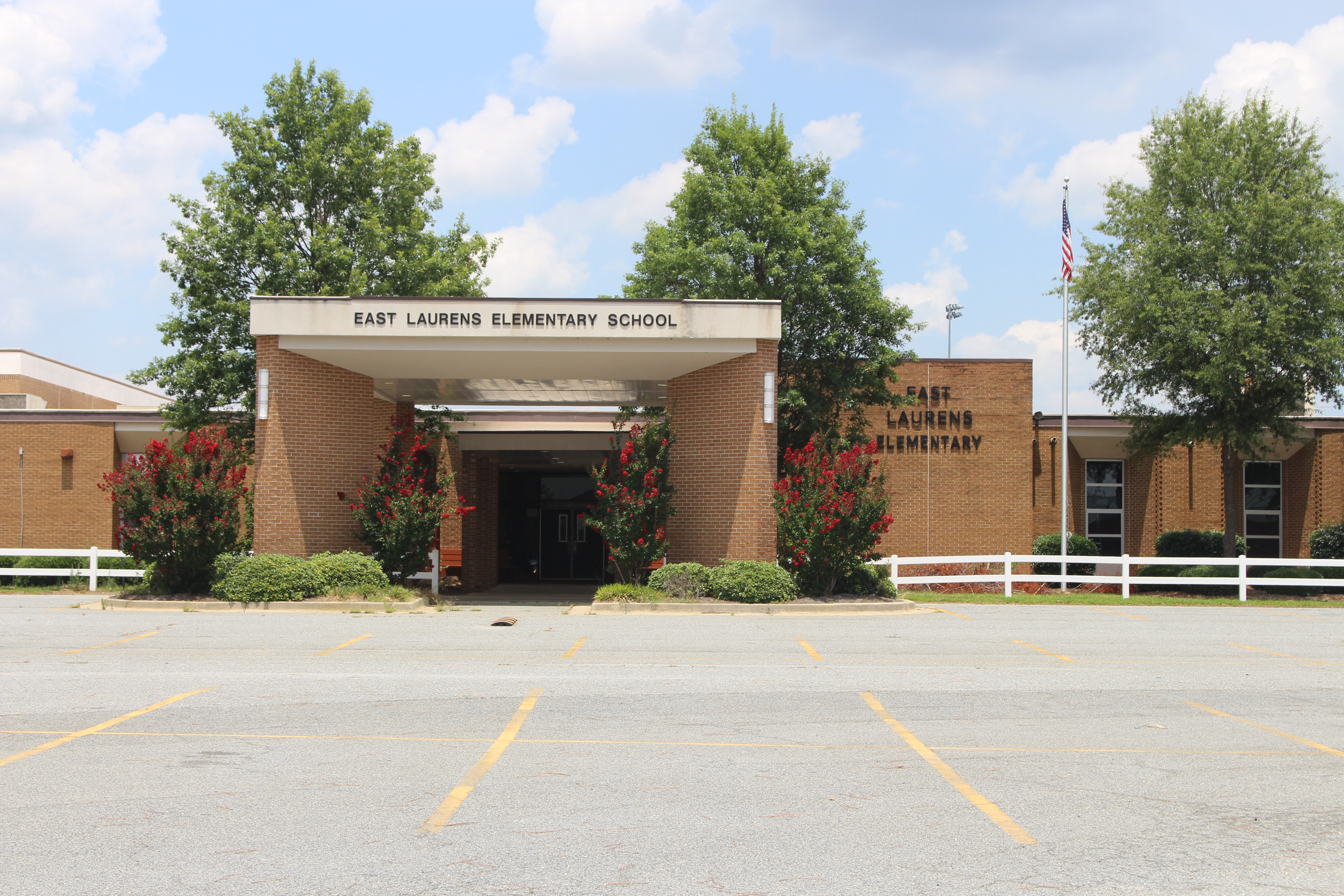
East Laurens Elementary School

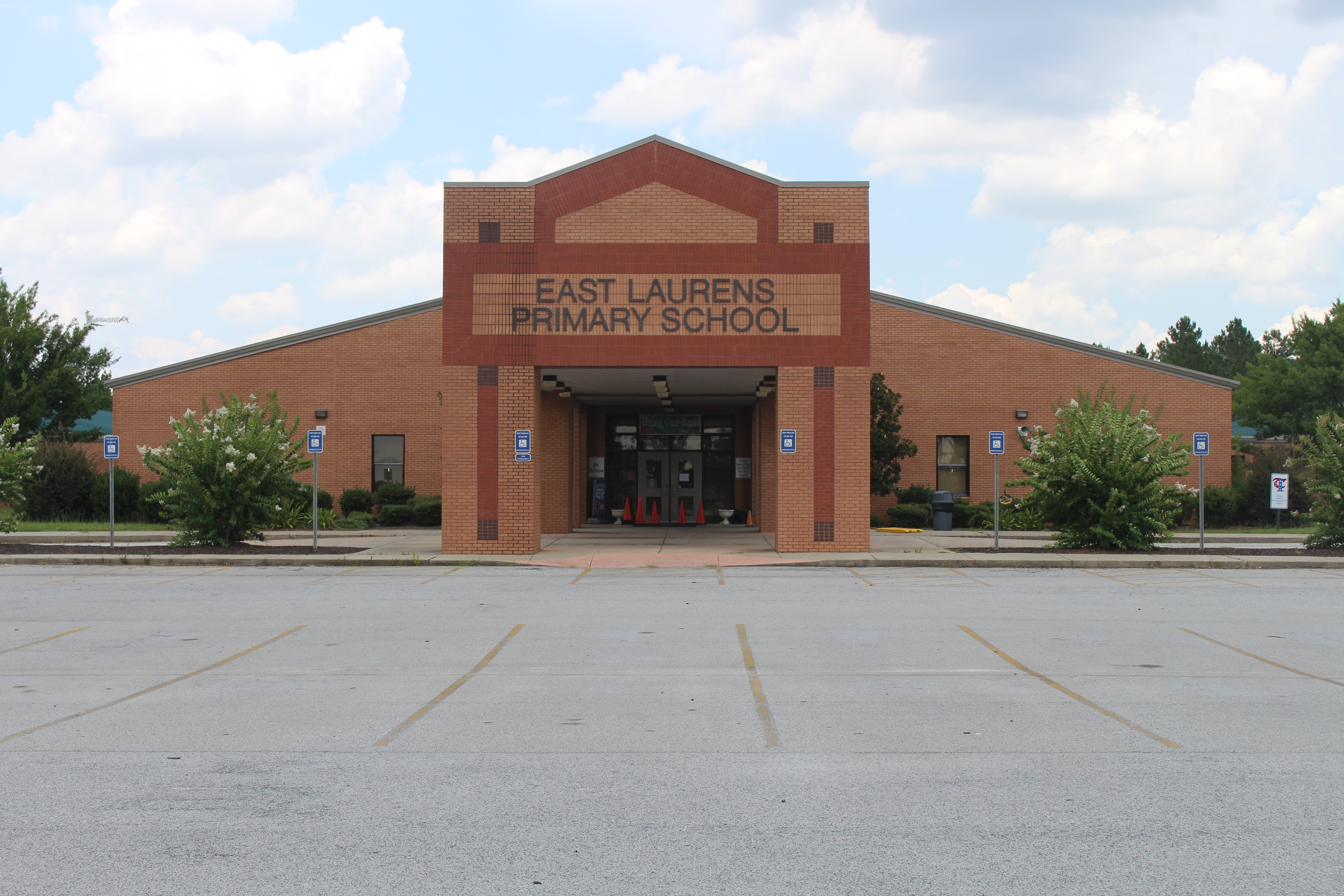
East Laurens Primary School
