= April 2007 nor'easter =

Category 1 nor'easter in 2007

Spring Nor'easter of 2007
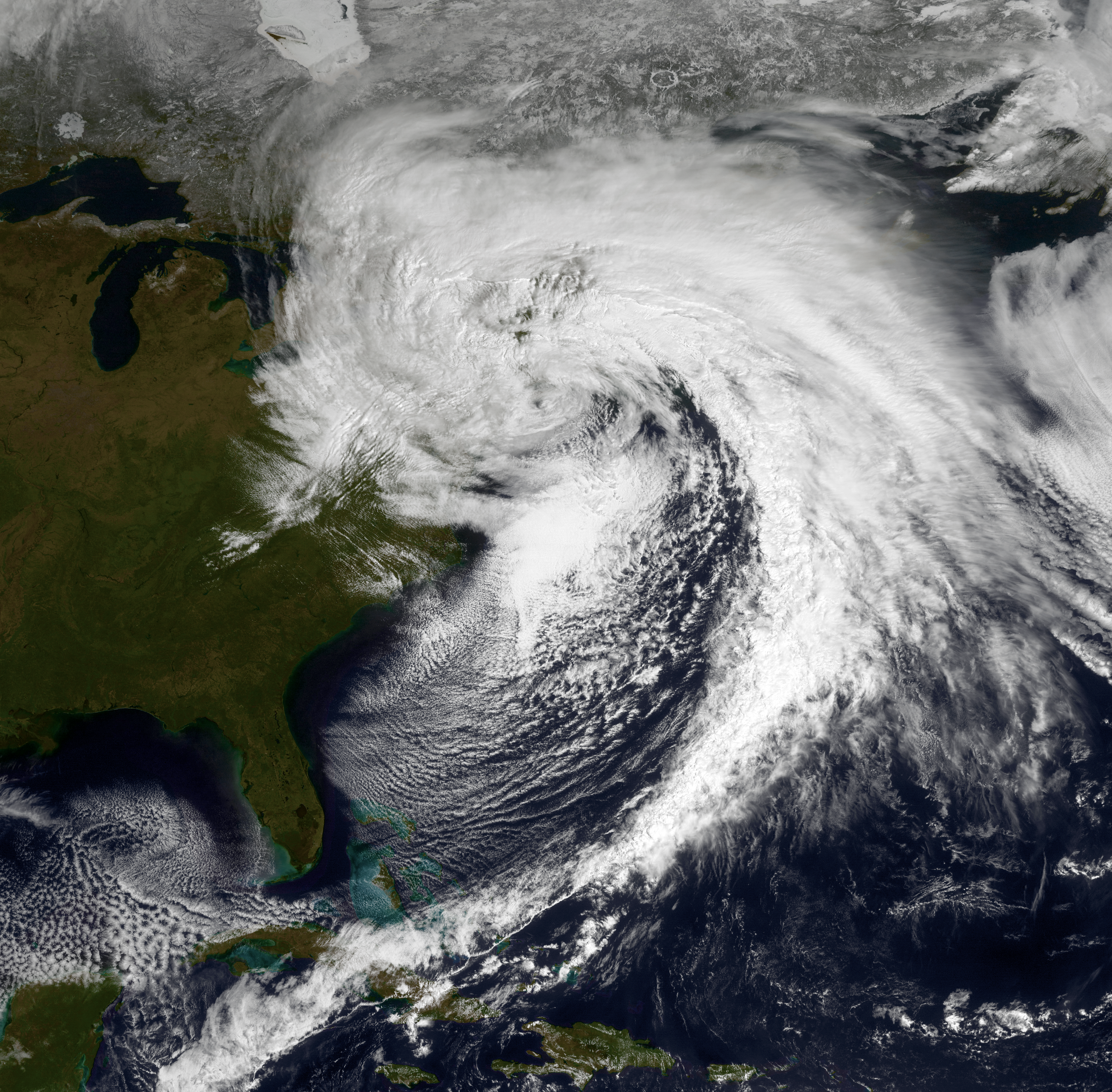
- Satellite imagery of the nor'easter impacting the Northeastern United States on April 16

Meteorological history
- Formed: April 13, 2007
- Dissipated: April 17, 2007

Category 1 "Notable" winter storm
- Regional snowfall index: 1.17 (NOAA)
- Lowest pressure: 969 mbar
- Max. snowfall: 23.0 inches (58.42 centimeters)

Tornado outbreak
- Tornadoes: 36
- Max. rating: EF3 tornado

Overall effects
- Fatalities: At least 18 (2 tornadic)
- Damage: $264 million (2007 USD)
- Areas affected: East Coast of the United States, Eastern Canada
- Part of the Winter storms of 2006–07 and the Tornadoes of 2007

The April or Spring nor'easter of 2007 was a nor'easter that affected mainly the eastern parts of North America during its four-day course, from April 14 to April 17, 2007. The combined effects of high winds, heavy rainfall, and high tides led to flooding, storm damages, power outages, and evacuations, and disrupted traffic and commerce. In the north, heavy wet snow caused the loss of power for several thousands of homes in Ontario and Quebec. The storm caused at least 18 fatalities.

== Meteorological history ==
Map plotting the storm's track and intensity, according to the Saffir–Simpson scale Map key Saffir–Simpson scale Tropical depression (≤38 mph, ≤62 km/h) Tropical storm (39–73 mph, 63–118 km/h) Category 1 (74–95 mph, 119–153 km/h) Category 2 (96–110 mph, 154–177 km/h) Category 3 (111–129 mph, 178–208 km/h) Category 4 (130–156 mph, 209–251 km/h) Category 5 (≥157 mph, ≥252 km/h) Unknown Storm type Tropical cyclone Subtropical cyclone Extratropical cyclone, remnant low, tropical disturbance, or monsoon depression

The storm that would become the April 2007 nor'easter started out in the Southwestern United States, as an upper-level disturbance in the jet stream, on April 13. It brought high wind and fire danger to California, Nevada, New Mexico and Arizona. The storm then moved out into the southern Plains States, bringing heavy snow to Colorado, Oklahoma, and Texas. Heavy rain and severe thunderstorms, with hail, wind, and tornadoes, affected parts of Texas, Louisiana, Mississippi, Alabama, Georgia, Florida, and the Carolinas. The storm then moved across the Mid-Atlantic States, and into the Atlantic Ocean, following the East Coast. The storm then rapidly intensified into a major nor'easter, with the warm waters of the Gulf Stream. The storm stalled just offshore from New York City and continued to strengthen. The lowest barometric pressure recorded was 968 millibars (28.58 in Hg), equivalent to that of a moderate Category 2 hurricane.

== Impact ==
Water levels of the Pompton River, New Jersey by April 16, 2007

The National Weather Service reported 7.57 inches (192 mm) of rain in Central Park by midnight of April 15, the second heaviest rainfall in 24 hours on record, and indicated that this storm caused the worst flooding since Hurricane Floyd in 1999. Major airports in the New York area resumed flights on April 16, after having had to cancel over 500 flights before. Local rail and transit lines reported delays and cancellations affecting the MTA, NJ Transit, LIRR, and Metro-North Railroad. Power failures affected several thousand people.

On April 16, 2007, the storm caused sustained winds of nearly 100 mph (87 knots) on, and near New Hampshire's Mount Washington, with gusts topping out at 156 mph (136 knots).

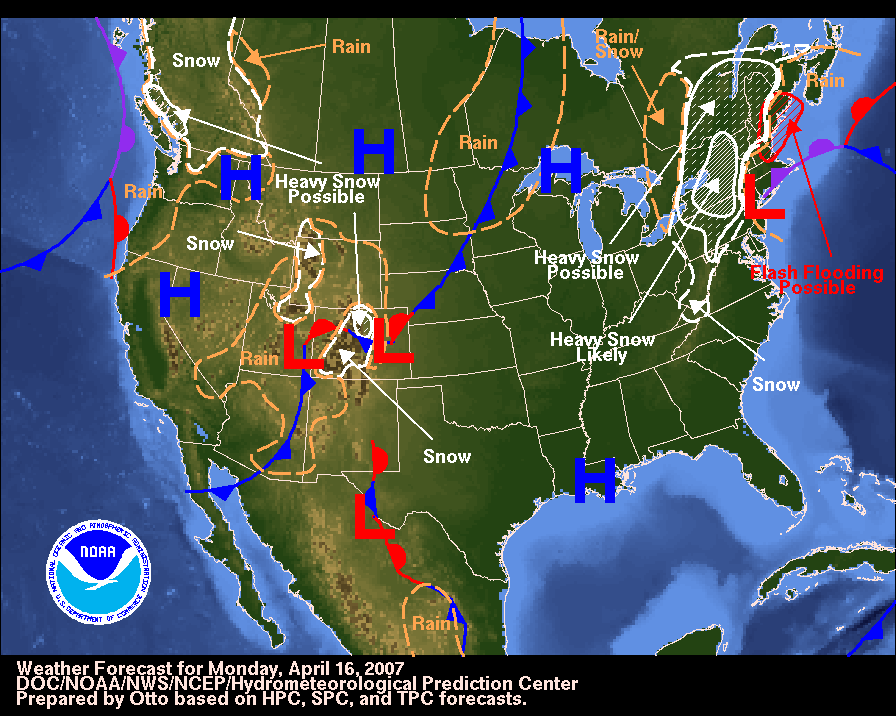
Nor'easter April 16, 2007

While areas closer to the shore received heavy rainfall, higher regions inland received unseasonal snow. Several towns suffered from flooding including Mamaroneck in New York, and Bound Brook and Manville in New Jersey, while coastal towns had to deal with damage from high tides. Most major highways in Westchester County, New York were closed on April 15 and April 16 due to extreme flooding. In Quebec, several regions including the Laurentides and Charlevoix regions received in excess of 6 inches (15 cm) of snow with areas exceeding well above 1 foot (30 cm) of snow. In the city of Ottawa, 17 cm (5 in) of heavy wet snow fell in just a few hours causing power lines and trees to fall down causing scattered blackouts in several parts of the city. Similar damage was reported in the higher elevations north of Montreal and Ottawa.

In total, more than 175,000 homes in Canada suffered a power outage, including 160,000 Hydro-Québec customers mainly in areas from Gatineau towards Quebec City including Montreal, Lanaudière and the Laurentians with an additional 15,000 Hydro One and Hydro Ottawa customers. In the US over a quarter million homes lost power with New York and Pennsylvania being the hardest hit states due to the strong winds.

Governor Eliot Spitzer of New York activated 3,200 members of the National Guard on alert. Richard Codey, acting governor of New Jersey, declared a state of emergency.

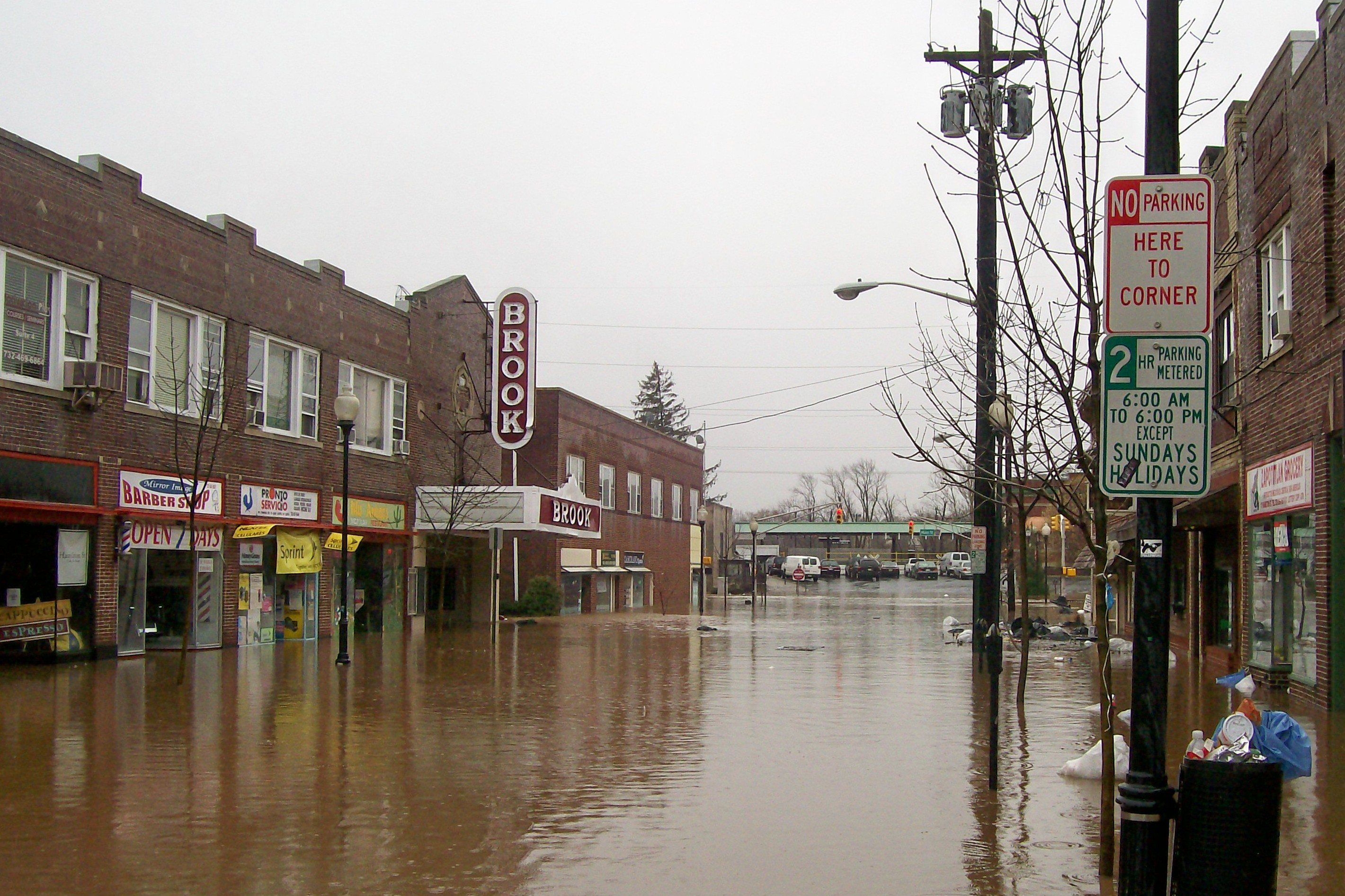
Downtown Bound Brook, New Jersey, April 16, 2007

The storm was blamed for several fatalities, including one person in a tornado in South Carolina, two people in storm-related traffic accidents in New York and Connecticut, two people in West Virginia, three people in New Jersey, and prior to its arrival in the East, five deaths in Kansas and Texas. In Quebec, an accident between a van and a tractor trailer killed five occupants of the van in a highway north of Montreal. Numerous other accidents were reported by OPP and the Sûreté du Québec during the storm.

The Boston Marathon took place in what many considered to be the worst weather in its 110-year history. Race officials held serious talks about whether or not to cancel the race. The men's race had the slowest winning time in thirty years (1977). In the women's race, "[t]he rainy and windy conditions led to the slowest winning time since 1985".

High winds during the storm prevented emergency medical services from using helicopters for evacuation of the injured at the Virginia Tech massacre.

The Internal Revenue Service delayed by two days the deadline for tax filing for victims of the nor'easter.

While filing for federal disaster relief, acting governor Codey of New Jersey indicated that the storm caused $180 million in property damage in New Jersey, making it the second-worst rain storm in its history, after Hurricane Floyd. In addition, New Hampshire received $30.5 million in aid following the storm, the most aid received for any storm in state history.

== Confirmed tornadoes ==
Confirmed tornadoes by Enhanced Fujita rating
EFU	EF0	EF1	EF2	EF3	EF4	EF5	Total
0	15	16	4	1	0	0	36

=== April 13 event ===
List of confirmed tornadoes – Friday, April 13, 2007 (Note: All dates are based on the local time zone where the tornado touched down; however, all times are in Coordinated Universal Time for consistency.)
EF#	Location	County / Parish	State	Start Coord.	Time (UTC)	Path length	Max width	Summary
EF0	NE of Rule	Haskell	TX	33.22°N 99.87°W	18:45–18:50	0.9 mi (1.4 km)	30 yd (27 m)	Brief tornado crossed Highway 6 and caused no damage.
EF0	S of Seymour	Baylor	TX	33.5199°N 99.3098°W	19:38–19:48	6 mi (9.7 km)	880 yd (800 m)	This large wedge tornado remained over open country, though it was likely capable of causing major damage.
EF0	Benbrook	Tarrant	TX	32.6812°N 97.4586°W	22:55–22:57	1.5 mi (2.4 km)	30 yd (27 m)	A tornado damaged fences, trees, and street signs. The façade of a business was also slightly damaged.
EF1	Northern Fort Worth to Haltom City	Tarrant	TX	32.7704°N 97.3257°W	23:09–23:15	6 mi (9.7 km)	125 yd (114 m)	1 death - Substantial roof damage was done to a grocery store, several homes, and a church. Another church suffered steeple damage, and commercial buildings were also damaged, including one that sustained total collapse of an east-facing wall. Tractor-trailers were damaged or destroyed, and numerous trees and power lines were downed as well. Damage was $1 million.
EF0	Eastern Dallas	Dallas	TX	32.7921°N 96.7165°W	00:00–00:02	1 mi (1.6 km)	30 yd (27 m)	Several trees, tree limbs, and fences were downed in a residential area, and apartment buildings sustained roof damage.
EF0	S of Royse City	Rockwall, Hunt	TX	32.9077°N 96.3343°W	00:45–00:47	1.95 mi (3.14 km)	30 yd (27 m)	Two barns were destroyed and fences were downed.
EF0	SW of Greenville	Hunt	TX	33.0365°N 96.1662°W	00:53–00:54	0.1 mi (0.16 km)	30 yd (27 m)	Brief tornado caused damage to trees.

=== April 14 event ===
List of confirmed tornadoes – Saturday, April 14, 2007
EF#	Location	County / Parish	State	Start Coord.	Time (UTC)	Path length	Max width	Summary
EF0	Pinebur	Marion	MS	31.16°N 89.72°W	15:10–15:11	0.3 mi (0.48 km)	30 yd (27 m)	Trees were snapped and large limbs were blown down.
EF0	ESE of Oak Bowery	Jones	MS	31.6049°N 89.3572°W	15:35–15:36	0.27 mi (0.43 km)	25 yd (23 m)	Brief tornado remained in rural areas with no damage.
EF1	SE of Petal	Forrest	MS	31.3223°N 89.1918°W	1641–1642	0.5 mi (0.80 km)	50 yd (46 m)	One home had significant damage with the carport being destroyed and other damage to sidings, roof and windows. Trees were snapped or uprooted and a power pole also snapped.
EF1	S of Vredenburgh	Monroe	AL	31.8184°N 87.3154°W	18:33–18:36	1.06 mi (1.71 km)	200 yd (180 m)	Following a large microburst, a tornado damaged two churches and an old home had its roof blown off and was pushed off its foundation. Trees were downed in a convergent pattern.
EF0	NW of Saville	Crenshaw	AL	32.0302°N 86.3892°W	21:00–21:02	0.54 mi (0.87 km)	40 yd (37 m)	A rope tornado damaged the tin roofs of three buildings on a poultry farm. A church had shingles taken off and a tree fell onto the roof.
EF1	NNW of Castleberry	Conecuh	AL	31.3334°N 87.0362°W	22:12–22:14	0.25 mi (0.40 km)	50 yd (46 m)	One residence was damaged and trees were blown down.
EF1	W of Tanyard	Pike, Bullock	AL	31.8812°N 85.7189°W	23:11–23:15	3.2 mi (5.1 km)	100 yd (91 m)	One barn was destroyed and several homes had minor roof damage. Numerous trees were snapped and uprooted as well.
EF1	Northern Ozark	Dale	AL	31.4807°N 85.6862°W	00:05–00:12	5.83 mi (9.38 km)	150 yd (140 m)	A carport, two sheds, a barn and a greenhouse were destroyed. A residential gable collapsed, and several homes sustained moderate damage in the community of Post Oak. Trees were downed as well, including one that landed on a house.
EF0	N of Morgan	Calhoun	GA	31.5473°N 84.6003°W	01:45–01:47	0.83 mi (1.34 km)	50 yd (46 m)	One structure was damaged and numerous trees were knocked down.
EF1	NW of Leesburg	Lee	GA	31.7649°N 84.269°W	02:30–02:33	2.47 mi (3.98 km)	100 yd (91 m)	Fifteen structures were damaged, including a mobile home and a frame home being destroyed. Numerous trees and power lines were downed as well.

=== April 15 event ===
List of confirmed tornadoes – Sunday, April 15, 2007
EF#	Location	County / Parish	State	Start Coord.	Time (UTC)	Path length	Max width	Summary
EF1	Eastman	Dodge	GA	32.2061°N 83.1971°W	05:23–05:28	4.48 mi (7.21 km)	100 yd (91 m)	A greenhouse, an announcers booth at a football field and two mobile homes were destroyed. Several retain buildings sustained minor damage as well. One home was destroyed by a fallen tree, injuring both occupants. Numerous trees and power lines were downed, some of which landed on homes and caused damage.
EF2	NE of Rentz to S of Dublin	Laurens	GA	32.4165°N 82.9557°W	05:45–05:54	6.03 mi (9.70 km)	200 yd (180 m)	Two mobile homes and a greenhouse were destroyed. The carport of a site-built home was removed as well as a portion of the roof. Several other mobile homes and site-built homes sustained minor damage from wind and fallen trees. 3 people were injured.
EF0	NE of Cedar Grove	Laurens	GA	32.3034°N 82.8538°W	05:50–05:58	5.92 mi (9.53 km)	50 yd (46 m)	Outbuildings were damaged and numerous trees were downed.
EF1	SE of Orland to NW of Norristown Junction	Treutlen, Emanuel, Johnson	GA	32.4454°N 82.6817°W	06:04–06:18	11.53 mi (18.56 km)	440 yd (400 m)	One mobile home was rolled over and a utility building lost portions of its roof. About a dozen homes in Adrian were damaged. Two homes at a campground were also damaged due to fallen trees. In Orianna, two homes were heavily damaged and outbuildings were destroyed. A mobile home was also destroyed in Emanuel County near the end of the path.
EF1	SE of Dublin to NNW of Meeks	Laurens, Johnson	GA	32.4954°N 82.8709°W	06:05–06:24	19.03 mi (30.63 km)	100 yd (91 m)	Outbuildings were destroyed and numerous trees and power lines were downed. Several homes and a church sustained minor damage, and a family life center was shifted off of its foundation.
EF2	E of Twin City to SSW of Garfield	Emanuel	GA	32.5596°N 82.1457°W	06:56–07:01	5.39 mi (8.67 km)	200 yd (180 m)	Two homes lost a significant portion of their roofs and outer walls. A mobile home was also damaged and some nearby outbuildings were destroyed.
EF1	NNE of Oakfield to NE of Arabi	Worth, Crisp	GA	31.8053°N 83.9650°W	07:23–07:39	14.56 mi (23.43 km)	200 yd (180 m)	A home and several silos were damaged while trees and power lines were downed. A mobile home was also pushed off its foundation while a car was thrown into a guard rail on Interstate 75.
EF2	Southern Eastman	Dodge	GA	32.1855°N 83.1815°W	08:25–08:30	3.64 mi (5.86 km)	200 yd (180 m)	Two mobile homes, a barn and a garage were destroyed while several homes sustained minor to heavy damage.
EF2	NW of Baxter	Baker	FL	30.53°N 82.25°W	11:15–?	1.5 mi (2.4 km)	300 yd (270 m)	A house sustained minor damage and an outbuilding was destroyed. Widespread tree damage occurred as well.
EF0	NW of Ehrhardt to SE of Bamberg	Bamberg	SC	33.16°N 81.07°W	11:47–11:58	7.6 mi (12.2 km)	50 yd (46 m)	Damage to trees and power lines occurred.
EF0	E of Ehrhardt	Bamberg	SC	33.07°N 81.01°W	12:11–12:17	4.16 mi (6.69 km)	50 yd (46 m)	Damage was limited to trees.
EF3	NW of Pinewood to NW of Mayesville	Sumter	SC	33.7876°N 80.4987°W	12:20–12:41	19.04 mi (30.64 km)	300 yd (270 m)	1 death – Seven mobile homes were destroyed, nine frame homes were severely damaged while 62 mobile and frame homes were damaged at varying degrees. 5 other people were injured.
EF1	E of St. Charles	Lee	SC	33.7876°N 80.4987°W	12:50–12:54	3.64 mi (5.86 km)	200 yd (180 m)	Tornado downed numerous trees, a few powerlines, and did minor damage to a church and a mobile home.
EF0	SE of Rowesville to N of Bowman	Orangeburg	SC	33.31°N 80.75°W	13:37–13:45	6.21 mi (9.99 km)	50 yd (46 m)	Damage to trees and power lines occurred.
EF1	S of Islandton	Colleton	SC	32.8783°N 80.9304°W	13:38–13:39	1 mi (1.6 km)	60 yd (55 m)	Hundreds of trees and power lines were downed, and a large barn was destroyed with debris scattered up to a half-mile away. A house sustained window, brick veneer, and siding damage. A large 8,000 lb (3,600 kg) horse trailer was lifted up and carried 500 ft (150 m), and an 800-pound grain wagon was lifted and carried 400 ft (120 m). A bass boat was flipped over and a 4-wheeler was damaged along with other farm equipment. A tree also fell on a mobile home as well.
EF1	SE of Islandton	Colleton	SC	32.8917°N 80.9061°W	13:41–13:42	0.5 mi (0.80 km)	30 yd (27 m)	Tornado carried two empty grain silos about 100 ft (30 m), snapped off or uprooted dozens of trees, destroyed a large portion of an outbuilding, and severely injured a dog.
EF1	SW of Ruffin	Colleton	SC	32.9599°N 80.8198°W	13:44–13:48	2 mi (3.2 km)	80 yd (73 m)	Tornado overturned 3 mobile homes and shifted another 7 mobile homes off of their foundations. It tore the skirting away from another mobile home, destroyed a storage shed, and snapped off or uprooted dozens of trees. A couple of trees fell on a house. A vehicle and an outbuilding were also damaged. 9 people were injured.
EF1	NW of Summer Haven	St. Johns	FL	29.72°N 81.24°W	14:10	0.2 mi (0.32 km)	50 yd (46 m)	Boat house roofs were blown off, and trees were snapped. Buildings had windows blown out and pieces of lumber embedded into them. Signs were bent over at 45-degree angles.
EF0	Dundee	Polk	FL	28.0089°N 81.6503°W	16:00–16:03	2 mi (3.2 km)	300 yd (270 m)	Several manufactured homes were damaged to various degrees, and some were left uninhabitable.

== See also ==
- Global storm activity of 2007
- Tornadoes of 2007
