= Center for Natural Hazards Research =

Research center in Greenville, NC

- Established: 2001
- Location: East Carolina University, Greenville, North Carolina, USA

The Center for Natural Hazards Research is an academic research center located in Greenville, North Carolina. The center is housed at East Carolina University and includes interdisciplinary collaborations between economics, geography and planning, engineering, climate science, sociology, and public administration. It serves as a conduit for natural hazards research, practice, and community-engaged scholarship focused on the people and places impacted by natural hazards.

The center focuses on hurricane, tornado, flooding and erosion hazards as they affect eastern North Carolina and the United States. Areas of active research include the financial impacts of hurricanes and floods, the effectiveness of warning systems, how policy-makers should handle evacuations, and how households can protect themselves from natural hazards. The mission of the center is to promote research and analysis that ultimately reduces the harm caused by forces of nature to life, communities and the environment.

== History ==
In response to the widespread devastation suffered in the wake of Hurricane Dennis and Hurricane Floyd, ECU's College of Arts and Sciences began the groundwork for the center in 2001. The center is part of the North Carolina Institute of Disaster Studies at the University of North Carolina.

The center received more than $200,000 in grants from the National Science Foundation in 2006 to study the effects of Hurricane Katrina on the gulf region and investigate reconstruction efforts in New Orleans. In academic year 2007–2008, the center received more than $650,000 in grants from the National Science Foundation, National Oceanic and Atmospheric Administration, NASA, Department of the Interior, Appalachian State University and the University of North Carolina.

The center hosted its first ever "hurricon" conference in February 2020. The conference was funded by the National Science Foundation and aims to better prepare communities for hurricanes.

== See also ==
- Disaster research
- East Carolina University
- Natural hazards
