= Hurricane Floyd =

Category 4 Atlantic hurricane in 1999

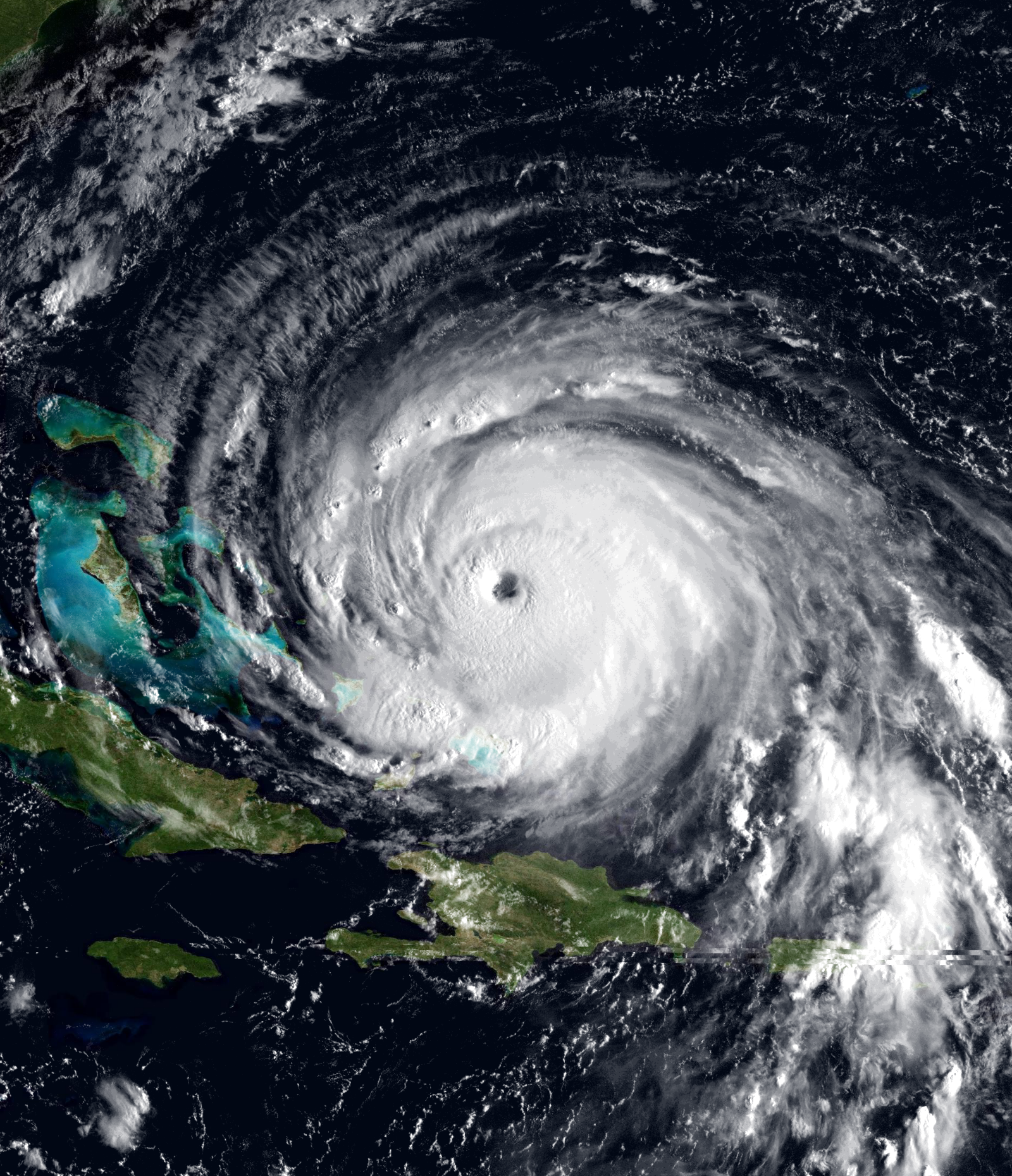
- Hurricane Floyd approaching the Bahamas at peak intensity on September 13

Meteorological history
- Formed: September 7, 1999
- Extratropical: September 17, 1999
- Dissipated: September 19, 1999

Category 4 major hurricane
- 1-minute sustained (SSHWS/NWS)
- Highest winds: 155 mph (250 km/h)
- Lowest pressure: 921 mbar (hPa); 27.20 inHg

Overall effects
- Fatalities: 85
- Damage: $6.5 billion (1999 USD)
- Areas affected: Lucayan Archipelago, East Coast of the United States, Atlantic Canada
- IBTrACS
- Part of the 1999 Atlantic hurricane season
- Effects: Florida; New Jersey; Other wikis: Commons: Floyd images

Hurricane Floyd was a powerful and destructive tropical cyclone which struck the Bahamas and the East Coast of the United States. It was the sixth named storm, fourth hurricane, and third major hurricane in the 1999 Atlantic hurricane season. Floyd triggered the fourth largest evacuation in US history (behind Hurricane Irma, Hurricane Gustav, and Hurricane Rita) when 2.6 million coastal residents of five states were ordered from their homes as it approached. The hurricane formed off the coast of Africa and lasted from September 7 to 19, becoming extratropical after September 17, and peaked in strength as a very strong Category 4 hurricane. It was among the largest Atlantic hurricanes of its strength ever recorded, in terms of gale-force diameter.

Floyd was once forecast to strike Florida, but turned away. Instead, Floyd struck the Bahamas at peak strength, causing heavy damage. It then moved parallel to the East Coast of the United States, causing massive evacuations and costly preparations from Florida through the Mid-Atlantic states. The storm weakened significantly, however, before striking the Cape Fear region, North Carolina as a very strong Category 2 hurricane, and caused further damage as it traveled up the Mid-Atlantic region and into New England.

The hurricane produced torrential rainfall in Eastern North Carolina, adding more rain to an area already hit by Hurricane Dennis just weeks earlier. The rains caused widespread flooding over a period of several weeks; nearly every river basin in the eastern part of the state exceeded 500-year flood levels. In total, Floyd was responsible for 85 fatalities and $6.5 billion (1999 USD) in damage. Due to the destruction, the World Meteorological Organization retired the name Floyd and replaced it with Franklin.

== Meteorological history ==
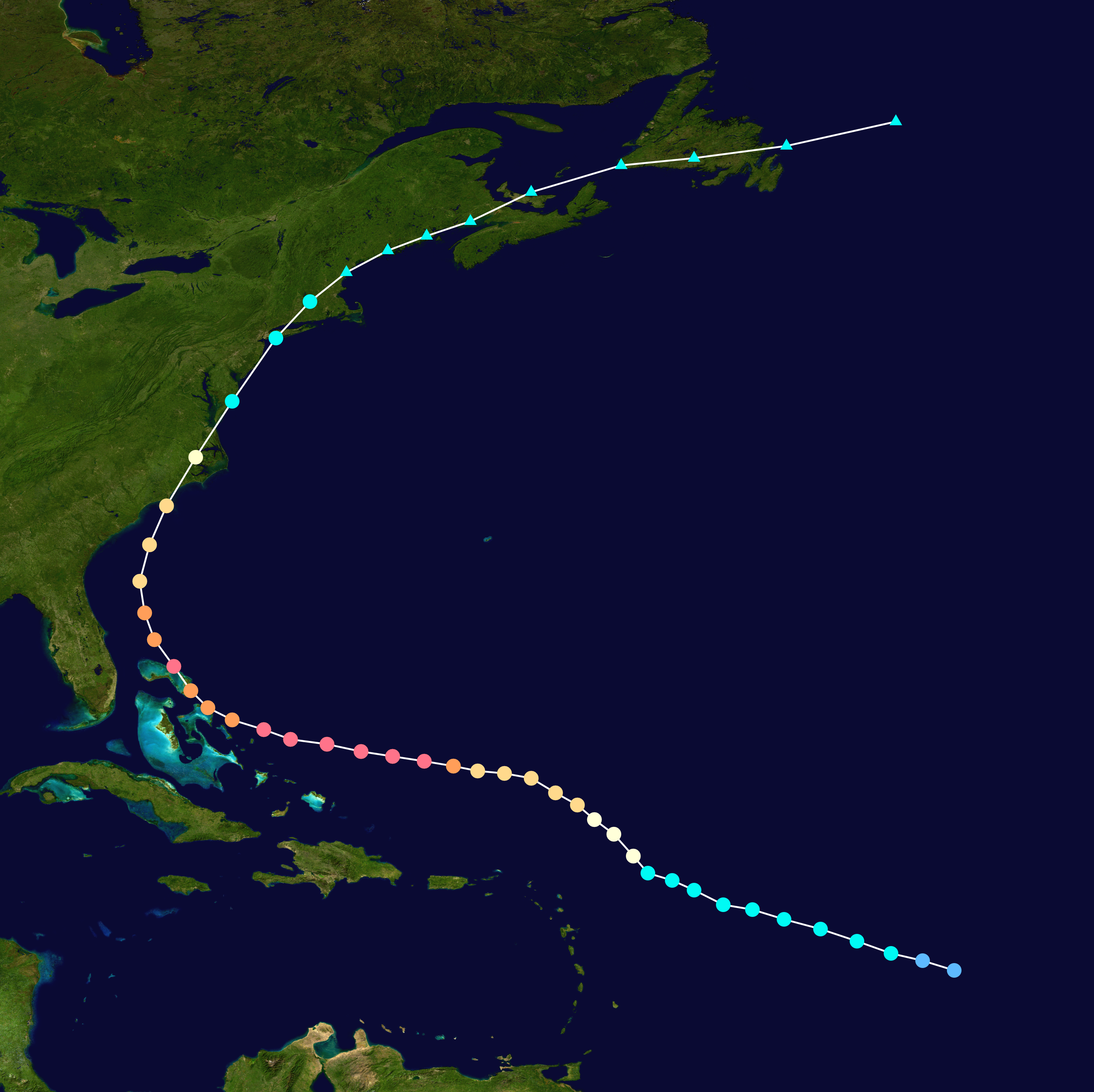
Map plotting the storm's track and intensity, according to the Saffir–Simpson scale Map key Saffir–Simpson scale Tropical depression (≤38 mph, ≤62 km/h) Tropical storm (39–73 mph, 63–118 km/h) Category 1 (74–95 mph, 119–153 km/h) Category 2 (96–110 mph, 154–177 km/h) Category 3 (111–129 mph, 178–208 km/h) Category 4 (130–156 mph, 209–251 km/h) Category 5 (≥157 mph, ≥252 km/h) Unknown Storm type Tropical cyclone Subtropical cyclone Extratropical cyclone, remnant low, tropical disturbance, or monsoon depression

Floyd originated from a tropical wave that exited the west coast of Africa on September 2. The wave moved generally westward, presenting a general curvature in its convection, or thunderstorms, but little organization at first. By September 5, a center of circulation was evident within the convective system. Over the next day, the thunderstorms increased in intensity as they organized into a curved band. Aided by favorable outflow, the system organized further into Tropical Depression Eight late on September 7, located about 1,000 mi (1,600 km) east of the Lesser Antilles. With a strong ridge of high pressure to its north, the nascent tropical depression moved to the west-northwest, where environmental conditions favored continued strengthening, including progressively warmer water temperatures. On issuing its first advisory, the National Hurricane Center (NHC) anticipated that the depression would intensify into a hurricane within three days, a forecast that proved accurate. On its second advisory, NHC forecaster Lixion Avila stated that the depression had "all the ingredients...that we know of...to become a major hurricane eventually."

Early on September 8, the depression became sufficiently well-organized for the NHC to upgrade it to Tropical Storm Floyd. The storm had a large circulation, but Floyd initially lacked a well-defined inner core, which resulted in only slow strengthening. The first Hurricane Hunters mission occurred on September 9, which observed the developing storm. On September 10, Floyd intensified into a hurricane about 230 mi (370 km) east-northeast of the Lesser Antilles. Around that time, the track shifted more to the northwest, steered by a tropical upper tropospheric trough north of Puerto Rico. An eye developed in the center of the hurricane, signaling strengthening. On September 11, Hurricane Floyd moved through the upper-level trough, which, in conjunction with an anticyclone over the eastern Caribbean, disrupted the outflow and caused the winds to weaken briefly. The hurricane re-intensified on September 12 as its track shifted more to the west, steered by a ridge to the north. That day, the NHC upgraded Floyd to a major hurricane, or a Category 3 on the Saffir-Simpson scale.

Radar imagery of Hurricane Floyd making landfall in North Carolina.

Over a 24-hour period from September 12–13, Hurricane Floyd rapidly intensified, aided by warm waters east of The Bahamas. During that time, the maximum sustained winds increased from 110 to 155 mph (177 to 249 km/h), (Note: All wind speeds in the article are maximum sustained winds sustained for one minute, unless otherwise noted.) making Floyd a strong Category 4 hurricane. This was based a 90% reduction of an observation by the Hurricane Hunters, which recorded flight-level winds of 171 mph (276 km/h). Around the same time, the pressure dropped to 921 mb (921 hPa; 27.2 inHg). Around this time, tropical cyclone forecast models suggested an eventual landfall in the Southeastern United States from Palm Beach, Florida to South Carolina.

At its peak, tropical storm-force winds spanned a diameter of 580 mi (930 km), making Floyd one of the largest Atlantic hurricanes of its intensity ever recorded. For about 12 hours, Hurricane Floyd remained just below Category 5 status while crossing The Bahamas. Late on September 13, the eye of the hurricane passed just north of San Salvador and Cat Islands. On the next day, the hurricane made landfalls on Eleuthera and Abaco islands. During this time, Floyd underwent an eyewall replacement cycle, in which an outer eyewall developed, causing the original eye to dissipate near Eleuthera. This caused a temporary drop in sustained winds to Category 3 status, only for Floyd to restrengthen briefly to a Category 4 on September 15.

While approaching the southeastern United States, a strong mid- to upper-level trough eroded the western portion of the high-pressure ridge, which had been steering Floyd for several days. The break in the ridge caused Floyd to turn to the northwest. After the hurricane completed its eyewall replacement cycle, Floyd had a large 57 mi (93 km) eye. The large storm gradually weakened after exiting The Bahamas, due to drier air and increasing wind shear. On September 15, Floyd paralleled the east coast of Florida about 110 mi (170 km) offshore, as it accelerated to the north and north-northeast. At around 06:30 UTC on September 16, Hurricane Floyd made landfall in Cape Fear, North Carolina with winds of 105 mph (169 km/h), a Category 2. The eyewall had largely dissipated by that time. Continuing northeastward along a cold front, Floyd moved through eastern North Carolina and southeastern Virginia, weakening to tropical storm status by late on September 16. The storm gradually lost its tropical characteristics as it quickly moved through the Delmarva Peninsula, eastern New Jersey, Long Island, and New England. Late on September 17, Floyd transitioned into an extratropical cyclone near the coast of southern Maine. The storm continued to the northeast, passing through New Brunswick, Prince Edward Island, and Newfoundland on September 18. On the following day, a larger extratropical storm over the North Atlantic Ocean absorbed what was once Hurricane Floyd.

== Preparations ==
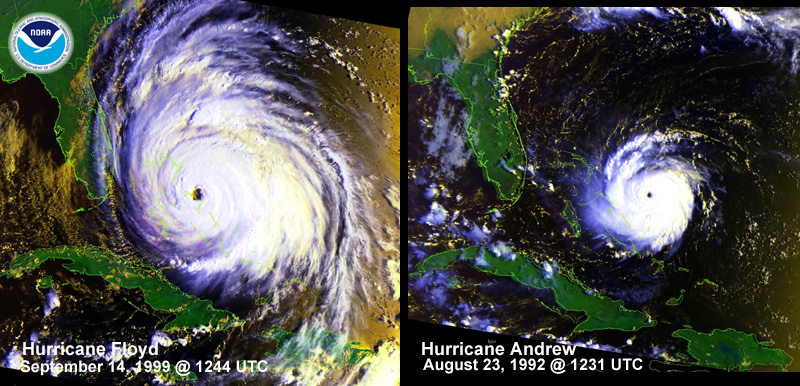
Visual comparison of Hurricane Floyd with Hurricane Andrew while at similar positions and nearly identical intensities

When Floyd posed a threat to the Lesser Antilles, a tropical storm watch was issued for Antigua and Barbuda, Anguilla, Saint Martin, and Saint Barthelemy.

On September 12, a tropical storm warning and a hurricane watch was issued for the Turks and Caicos Islands and the southeast Bahamas. A day later, the Bahamas issued a hurricane warning for the central and northwestern parts of the archipelago. Nassau International Airport shut down during the hurricane. Hotels provided tourists riding out the storm with candles.

While Floyd was near peak intensity on September 13, the NHC noted the differing forecasts by computer models, which anticipated the hurricane could hit anywhere from Palm Beach, Florida to South Carolina. That day, the agency issued a hurricane warning from Florida City, Florida to Brunswick, Georgia. Ultimately, nearly all of the East Coast of the United States from Florida City, Florida, to Plymouth, Massachusetts, was under a hurricane warning. The last time such widespread hurricane warnings occurred was during Hurricane Donna in 1960. Due to the hurricane's threat, around 2.6 million people evacuated from Florida to the Carolinas, which was the largest peacetime evacuation in U.S. history at the time.

Florida governor Jeb Bush declared a state of emergency in anticipation of Floyd's approach. More than 1 million people in the state were ordered to evacuate, including 272,000 in Miami-Dade County. Navy ships and military aircraft flew away from the state, and Kennedy Space Center reduced its crew. Walt Disney World closed for the first time in its history due to the storm. SeaWorld was also closed. Flights were canceled across southern Florida. A state of emergency was also declared in Georgia. A hurricane warning was issued for the North Carolina coastline 27 hours prior to landfall. Officials opened at least 40 emergency shelters in North Carolina.

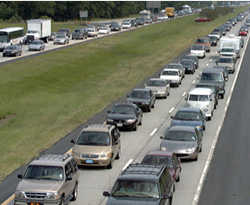
Evacuation on Interstate 26

In Baltimore, the Baltimore Orioles postponed a baseball game. Pennsylvania governor Tom Ridge declared a state of emergency for eastern Pennsylvania. A state of emergency was declared in Delaware, Maryland, and New Jersey, prompting schools statewide to be shut down on September 16. In Delaware, about 300 people evacuated. Across New York, schools were closed and flights were cancelled. This included the first school closures for New York City since the Blizzard of 1996. The National Weather Service issued flood watches as far north as Maine.

In Atlantic Canada, the Canadian Hurricane Centre issued 14 warnings related to Floyd, generating significant media interest. About 100 Sable Offshore Energy Project employees were evacuated to the mainland. In southwestern Nova Scotia, 66 schools were closed, and provincial ferry service with Bar Harbor, Maine was canceled.

== Impact ==
Death toll by area
- State/country: Deaths
| The Bahamas | 1 |
| North Carolina | 51 |
| Virginia | 4 |
| Maryland | 2 |
| Delaware | 2 |
| Pennsylvania | 13 |
| New Jersey | 8 |
| New York | 2 |
| Connecticut | 1 |
| Vermont | 1 |
- Total: 85

With a death toll of 85, Hurricane Floyd was the deadliest United States hurricane since Hurricane Agnes in 1972. The storm was the third-costliest hurricane in the nation's history at the time, with monetary damage estimated at $6.5 billion (1999 USD); it ranked the 19th costliest as of 2017. Most of the deaths and damage were from inland, freshwater flooding in eastern North Carolina.

=== Caribbean ===
Around when Floyd first became a hurricane, its outer bands moved over the Lesser Antilles.

While Floyd moved through the Bahamas, a station in Nassau recorded wind gusts of 78 mph (126 km/h), along with sustained winds of 64 mph (102 km/h). Grand Bahama Island recorded a tide of 5.27 ft (1.61 m) above mean sea level. Floyd also dropped heavy rainfall across the Bahamas, peaking at 9.32 in (237 mm) in Little Harbour in the Abacos. The hurricane also produced waves estimated up to 50 ft (15 m) in height. A 20 ft (6.10 m) storm surge inundated many islands with over five ft (1.5 m) of water throughout. The wind and waves toppled power and communication lines, severely disrupting electricity and telephone services for days. Damage was greatest at Abaco Island, Cat Island, San Salvador Island, and Eleuthera Island, where Floyd uprooted trees and destroyed a significant number of houses. Numerous restaurants, hotels, shops, and homes were devastated, severely limiting in the recovery period tourism on which many rely for economic well-being. Damaged water systems left tens of thousands across the archipelago without water, electricity, or food. One person drowned in Freeport. A few injuries were reported.

=== Southeastern United States ===
For several days, Floyd paralleled the east coast of Florida, producing about $50 million in damage, mostly in Volusia county. There, high winds and falling trees damaged 337 homes. The highest recorded wind gust in the state was 69 mph (111 km/h) in Daytona Beach. Beach erosion affected much of the state's Atlantic coast. The most significant effects were in Brevard and Volusia counties, where waves damaged houses and piers. Rainfall in the state reached 3.2 in (81 mm) in Sanford. When Floyd passed by the area, Kennedy Space Center only reported light winds with minor water intrusion. Overall damage was minor and was repaired easily.

Farther north in Georgia, Floyd produced wind gusts of 53 mph (85 km/h) at Savannah International Airport. The winds knocked down a few trees and power lines near the coast, but statewide damage was minimal. In Savannah, the hurricane produced tides 3.3 ft (1.0 m) above normal. Rainfall was light in the state, reaching 0.85 in (22 mm) in Newington.

Tropical storm force winds affected the entirety of the South Carolina coastline, with statewide damage estimated at $17 million. Sustained winds reached 54 mph (87 km/h) at the Charleston National Weather Service Office, which also recorded wind gusts of 85 mph (137 km/h). The winds destroyed a few roofs and knocked down thousands of trees, leaving more than 200,000 people without electricity. The hurricane produced above normal tides along the coast, reaching 10.1 ft (3.1 m) above normal in Charleston Harbor. The waves caused minor to moderate beach erosion. At Myrtle Beach International Airport, Hurricane Floyd dropped 16.06 in (408 mm) of rainfall, the highest recorded in the state.

=== North Carolina ===
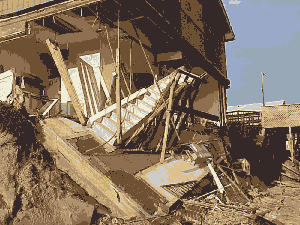
Coastal property damage at Pine Knoll Shores, North Carolina

In North Carolina, Floyd killed 52 people and left more than $3 billion in damage, becoming the costliest hurricane in the state's history. It retained this status until 2018, when Hurricane Florence left $22 billion in damage in the state. Of the 52 statewide deaths, at least 23 were near or in flooded vehicles, 6 drowned in a capsized boat, and 1 was a fatal car accident. Throughout the state, the hurricane left 500,000 people without electricity. Floyd damaged 56,000 homes statewide, with 17,000 homes left uninhabitable, and another 7,000 homes destroyed. About 10,000 people stayed in temporary shelters after the storm. There was also extensive agriculture damage in the state, estimated at $812.6 million. The floods killed more than 2.9 million poultry, 30,500 hogs, and 880 cattle.

Less than two weeks after Tropical Storm Dennis affected the state, Floyd brought additional rainfall and saturated grounds. A pluviometer north of Southport recorded 24.06 in (611 mm) of rainfall during the storm, the highest rainfall total in the country associated with Floyd. Much of east-central North Carolina received more than 12 in (300 mm) of precipitation, with a 24-hour total of 15.06 in (383 mm) recorded in Wilmington, breaking the 128 year record. Nearly every river basin east of Raleigh recorded 500 year floods. Water gauges at 39 locations reached record levels in the state, with record floods along the Cape Fear, Chowan, Neuse, Pee Dee, Tar, and Waccamaw rivers. The most significant flooding occurred along the Tar River at Tarboro, which crested 29.74 ft (9.06 m) above flood stage in Greenville. The floods severely damaged the communities of Tarboro and Princeville. Floods submerged Princeville for 12 days. Damages in Pitt County alone were estimated at $1.6 billion. When a river gauge on the Tar near Greenville malfunctioned, a National Weather Service employee took manual observations every hour to document the record flood. The Neuse River at Goldsboro crested at 28.85 ft (8.79 m), breaking the record set after Hurricane Fran in 1996. Much of Duplin and Greene counties were under water. Of the state's eastern rivers, only the Lumber River escaped catastrophic flooding.

The floods' coverage reached around 6,600 sq mi (17,000 km^{2}). Floodwaters closed nearly 1,000 roads in the state, including I-95 from Johnston County to Virginia, I-40 from Sampson to New Hanover counties, and several other roads, with ten bridges destroyed. More than 1,500 people required rescue from their flooded homes. Rail travel across the area was halted. Flooding forced the East Carolina Pirates to relocate their football game against Miami to N.C. State's Carter–Finley Stadium in Raleigh. Some locations remained flooded for two months, after Hurricane Irene produced additional floods in October 1999. Much of the western portion of the state remained under a severe drought.

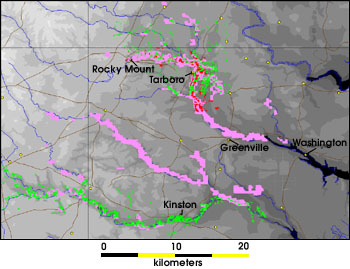
Flooded areas from Floyd along the Tar and Neuse rivers as of September 17 as of September 23 as of September 30

When Floyd made landfall on North Carolina, the NHC estimated maximum sustained winds of around 105 mph (169 km/h). The highest reported sustained wind was 64 mph (103 km/h) at Marine Corps Air Station Cherry Point. Wind gusts were much higher, reaching 138 mph (222 km/h) in Wrightsville Beach, at the elevation of an eight–story building. Other strong wind gusts included 122 mph (196 km/h) at Topsail Beach, and 120 mph (190 km/h) at the Wilmington Emergency Operations Center. The National Weather Service issued 20 tornado warnings for the state. Floyd spawned at least 16 tornadoes across eastern North Carolina. Ten of these occurred in the Wilmington area. In Perquimans County, a tornado destroyed two houses and damaged two others. Along the Atlantic Coast, Albemarle Sound, and river basins, Floyd produced a significant storm tide. The highest water level in the state was 10.3 ft (3.1 m) on Masonboro Island. The hurricane caused significant beach erosion along south-facing beaches. Pine Knoll Shores lost about 50 ft (15 m) of sand. Two coastal piers lost significant sections from the waves. On Ocracoke Island, high tides washed away dunes at ten locations. On Oak and Topsail Islands, the high waters damaged homes.

=== Mid-Atlantic states ===
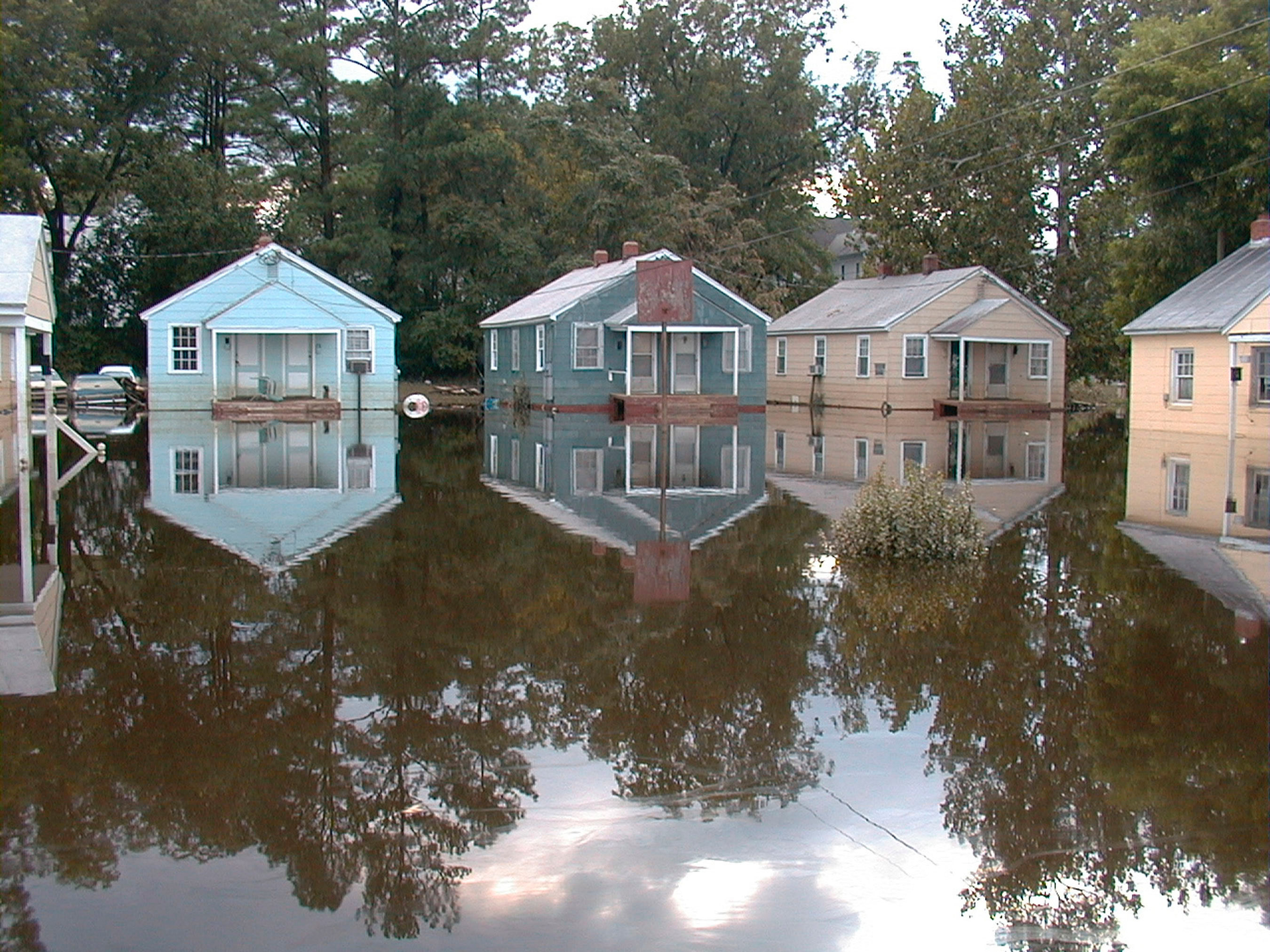
Flooding in Franklin, Virginia

The interaction of Floyd and a stalled cold front brought significant rainfall across the Mid-Atlantic states, as the storm produced strong wind gusts.

In Virginia, rainfall reached 16.57 in (421 mm) in Newport News, while the highest wind gust was 100 mph (160 km/h), recorded on the James River Bridge. The storm downed hundreds of power lines and trees, some centuries old. Statewide damage totaled $101 million, and there were four fatalities – two from fallen trees in Fairfax and Halifax County, one in a traffic accident in Hanover County, and a man in Accomack County who drowned in his submerged vehicle. The heavy rains washed out several roads, and closed regional routes including Interstate 95 between Emporia and Petersburg, U.S. Route 58 between Emporia and Franklin, and U.S. Route 460 near Wakefield. The rainfall led to overflowing rivers in the Chowan River Basin, some of which exceeded 500-year flood levels. The Blackwater River reached 100-year flood levels and flooded Franklin with 12 ft (3.7 m) of water. Extensive road damage occurred there, isolating the area from the rest of the state. Some 182 businesses and 150 houses were underwater in Franklin from the worst flooding in 60 years. Two dams along the Rappahannock River burst from the extreme flooding. Throughout Virginia, Floyd damaged 9,250 houses. Along the Atlantic and Chesapeake Bay, Floyd produced a 5 to 7 ft (1.5 to 2.1 m) storm surge, causing coastal flooding.

Wind gusts in Washington, D.C. reached 56 mph (90 km/h) at the Children's National Medical Center. The storm caused a shop on New York Avenue NW to close after the roof collapsed. The hurricane's rainbands moved across Maryland, dropping 12.59 in (320 mm) of rainfall in Chestertown, Maryland. About 450 people evacuated from low-lying areas. A mudslide in Anne Arundel County stranded five trains carrying about 1,000 passengers. Flooding closed 225 roads statewide, with dozens of motorists requiring rescue, and more than 90 bridges were damaged. A man in Centreville died while attempting to jump a washed out bridge on his motorcycle. High tides, 2 to 3 ft (0.61 to 0.91 m) above normal, destroyed 5 houses and severely damaged 23 others. Flooding inundated the only bridge to St. George Island, stranding six people. Wind gusts peaked at 71 mph (114 km/h) in Tall Timbers. The winds knocked down hundreds of trees, including the nearly 400 year–old Liberty Tree at St. John's College in Annapolis. The winds also knocked down power lines, leaving about 500,000 customers without electricity. Two people were injured, and one person killed, from Carbon monoxide poisoning related to using a generator. The Anne Arundel county fair was canceled for the first time in its history. Statewide damage was estimated at $7.9 million.

In Delaware, rainfall peaked at 12.58 in (320 mm) in Greenwood, breaking the state's highest 24 hour rainfall total. The rains caused record crests along rivers and streams in New Castle County. The White Clay Creek crested at 17.6 ft (5.4 m), and was above flood stage for 18 hours. Statewide damage totaled $8.42 million, including 171 damaged homes, and another 33 homes that were condemned. Flooding closed hundreds of roads and bridges, and dozens of motorists required rescue. The floods washed out two bridges and a few miles of track belonging to the Wilmington and Western Railroad. Winds in the state reached 64 mph (104 km/h) at Cape Henlopen. The winds knocked down trees and power lines, leaving about 25,000 people without power.

Rainfall in New Jersey reached 14.13 in (359 mm) in Little Falls. Following the state's fourth-worst drought in a century, the rains collected in rivers and streams, causing record flooding at 18 river gauges, and mostly affecting the Raritan, Passaic, and Delaware basins. Statewide damage totaled $250 million, much of it in Somerset and Bergen counties. This made Floyd the costliest natural disaster in New Jersey's history, until it was surpassed by Hurricane Irene in 2011. Seven people died in New Jersey during Floyd's passage – six due to drowning, and one in a traffic accident. A police lieutenant took his life after working for nearly 48 hours coordinating floodwater rescues. In Bound Brook, the Raritan crested at a record 42.5 ft (13.0 m) on September 16, well above the 28 ft (8.5 m) flood stage, and exceeding the previous record of 37.5 ft (11.4 m) set during Tropical Storm Doria in 1971. Downtown Bound Brook was flooded 13 ft (4.0 m), causing 200 buildings to be condemned. In Manville, the Raritan crested at a record 27.5 ft (8.4 m), nearly double the flood stage of 14 ft (4.3 m). Parts of Manville were flooded to a depth of 10 ft (3.0 m), which damaged 1,500 homes, caused 284 homes to be condemned, and forced 1,000 people to evacuate. A water treatment plant was damaged in Bridgewater Township, forcing nearly 500,000 people in Hunterdon, Mercer, Middlesex, and Somerset counties to boil water for eight days. The Rochelle Park hub of Electronic Data Systems was inundated by the nearby Saddle River, disrupting service to as many as 8,000 ATMs across the United States. Flooding in an adjoining Bell Atlantic switching facility cut off phone service to 1 million customers in the area.

In Pennsylvania, Floyd killed 13 people – four due to drownings, four from traffic accidents, three from heart-attacks, and two from fallen trees. Another 40 people were severely injured. The storm dropped heavy rainfall across the state, peaking at 12.13 in (308 mm) in Marcus Hook. The rains led to 100–year floods along rivers and streams in southeastern Pennsylvania. More than 10,000 homes were flooded, forcing about 7,000 people to evacuate. Hundreds of people required rescue from the floodwaters, using boats or jet-skis. About 400 people were stranded at the Radisson Hotel. In Conshohocken, ten people evacuated an inundated train, but when the rescue boat capsized, they had to hold onto a tree. The floods damaged 1,000 homes and left another 200 homes destroyed or uninhabitable. More than 500 apartments and 100 businesses were also flooded. Floods from the Darby and Cobb creeks, reaching 8 ft (2.4 m) deep, damaged parts of Darby in Delaware County. In Aston Township, mud accumulated to 3 to 4 ft (0.91 to 1.22 m). Statewide damage was estimated around $60 million, of which one-third was related to infrastructure. Hundreds of roads and bridges were damaged or closed, including parts of the regional rail network. Runoff inundated treatments plants, causing raw sewage to empty into rivers. Tidal flooding also occurred in southeastern Pennsylvania. Wind gusts in the state reached 58 mph (93 km/h) at the Commodore Barry Bridge. The combination of high winds and rains knocked down hundreds of trees and power lines, leaving about 501,000 customers without power. Downed trees also damaged the Gibson's Covered Bridge. High winds knocked over several freight train cars along the Rockville Bridge, which spans the Susquehanna River; their contents did not spill.

Tropical Storm Floyd over New England on September 16

In New York, rainfall peaked at 13.70 in (348 mm) in Brewster, New York. The rains produced floods that killed two people – a 9 year-old girl in Wingdale, and a 53 year-old man in Orangetown. Albany recorded their wettest day on record, with 5.6 in (140 mm) of rainfall. Rivers and tributaries flooded across New York, forcing 27 homes to evacuate and causing flood damage across four counties. Portions of a few roads, including a portion of NY 32, were washed out. Wind gusts in the state peaked at 62 mph (100 km/h) in Newburgh. The winds and heavy rains caused widespread tree and power line damage, leaving more than 100,000 people without electricity. A dam on a mill pond broke near Lake Placid, leading to flooding along the Chubb River.

=== New England ===
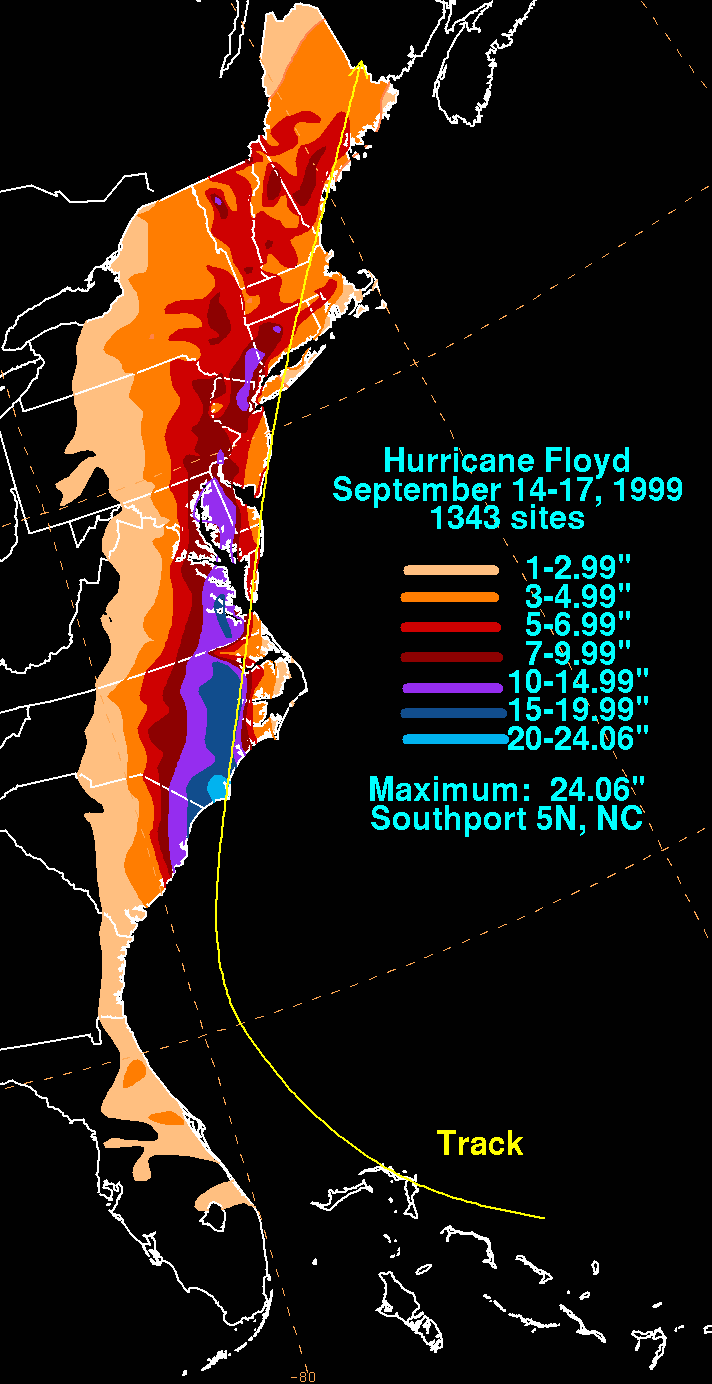
Rainfall in the United States and Canada

In Connecticut, the storm caused one casualty: a man drowned after boating in the swollen Quinnipiac River. Rainfall in the state peaked at 11.4 in (290 mm) in West Hartford. Numerous rivers overflowed, including the Still River and its tributaries, which triggered severe flooding. Floods in Danbury were the worst in 40 years, where hundreds of homes and vehicles were damaged after floodwaters reached 4 ft (1.2 m) deep. Across the state, several roads and basements were inundated. Wind gusts exceeding 50 mph (80 km/h), combined with the saturated ground, brought down many trees and triggered severe power outages in the area. Damage totaled $2.4 million. In neighboring Rhode Island, rainfall reached 7.12 in (181 mm) at North Smithfield, which caused the Pawtuxet River to slightly exceed flood stage. Storm tides were 5.6 ft (1.7 m) above normal in Providence, which inundated low-lying areas. The winds, peaking at 45 mph (72 km/h) in Block Island, knocked down trees and wires. In Massachusetts, wind gusts reached 76 mph (122 km/h) in New Bedford. The winds knocked downed trees and power lines, which closed roads near Pittsfield. Rainfall in the state reached 9.16 in (233 mm) in Southwick. The rains flooded rivers and streams across western Massachusetts.

Rainfall across New England peaked at 11.53 in (293 mm) on Mount Mansfield in Vermont. Wind gusts in the state peaked at 60 mph (97 km/h) in Hardwick. The combination of the winds and rainfall knocked down many trees, killing a camper in Randolph. In Putney, a driver was injured when a tree destroyed her vehicle. Thousands of people lost power, leading to school closures and the cancelation of the annual Tunbridge World's Fair. Downed trees also damaged hiking trails. The rains also produced floods that washed out a portion of U.S. 5 in Weathersfield. The storm produced 8 to 10 ft (2.4 to 3.0 m) waves along Lake Champlain, damaging a few boats and halting ferry service. In neighboring New Hampshire, rainfall peaked at 9.54 in (242 mm) on Mount Washington. Wind gusts in the state reached 47 mph (76 km/h) in Portsmouth. The combination of winds and rains downed trees and power lines, leaving 10,000 people in the state without power. There was also minor flooding. In Maine, the precipitation peaked at 8.72 in (221 mm) in Poland. The rains inundated a few basements and roads. Wind gusts reached 40 mph (65 km/h) in Maine, causing scattered power outages.

=== Canada ===
The remnants of Floyd produced rainfall and gusty winds from Ontario to Atlantic Canada, with 118 km/h (73 mph) occurring along the Saint Lawrence River in Quebec, the strongest winds in the country. The high winds damaged corn and other crops along the river's south shore from the l'Amiante to Bellechasse regions. The highest rainfall in Canada also occurred in eastern Quebec, reaching 4.8 in (122 mm). Power outages affected Montreal and Quebec City, causing classes to be canceled at the Université de Montréal. Inclement weather was a potential factor in a five car accident on Autoroute 15 in Montreal. Minor traffic accidents also occurred in the Maritimes. Heavy rainfall backed up storm drains in Fredericton, New Brunswick. The Confederation Bridge connecting Prince Edward Island to the mainland shut down during the storm due to 72 miles per hour (116 km/h) winds. About 6,000 people lost power in Nova Scotia.

== Aftermath ==
=== The Bahamas ===
To help the affected citizens, the Bahamas Red Cross Society opened 41 shelters, though within one week many returned home. The Bahamas required $435,000 (1999 USD; $840,716 2026 USD) in aid following the storm, much of it in food parcels. The Inter-American Development Bank loaned $21 million (1999 USD; $40.6 million 2026 USD) to the archipelago to restore bridges, roads, seawalls, docks, and other building projects in the aftermath of the hurricane.

=== United States ===
Then-President Bill Clinton designated several counties as federal disaster areas, including 11 in Florida, 6 in Georgia, 66 in North Carolina, 43 (Note: Includes independent cities) in Virginia, 11 in Maryland, 1 in Delaware, 8 in Pennsylvania, 9 in New Jersey, 4 in New York, 3 in Connecticut, 10 in Vermont, 3 in New Hampshire, and 5 in Maine.

=== North Carolina ===
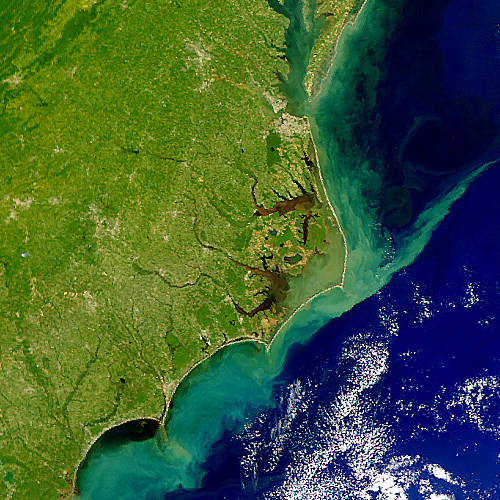
Runoff in the aftermath of the hurricane

Across eastern North Carolina, residents were advised to boil water due to water contamination; this included seven communities that still had to boil water by the end of November 1999. In describing Floyd's effects, North Carolina's Secretary of Health and Human Services, H. David Bruton, stated, "nothing since the Civil War has been as destructive to families here." In the 44 counties that sustained the most damage, about 75% of businesses temporarily closed, averaging 5–8 days. The lost revenue was estimated around $4 billion. About 31,000 people lost their jobs, and around 17% of small businesses lacked flood insurance.

Runoff from the hurricane created significant problems for the ecology of North Carolina's rivers and sounds. In the immediate aftermath of the storm, freshwater runoff, sediment, and decomposing organic matter caused salinity and oxygen levels in Pamlico Sound and its tributary rivers to drop to nearly zero. This raised fears of massive fish and shrimp kills, as had happened after Hurricane Fran and Hurricane Bonnie, and the state government responded quickly to provide financial aid to fishing and shrimping industries. Strangely, however, the year's shrimp and crab harvests were extremely prosperous; one possible explanation is that runoff from Hurricane Dennis caused marine animals to begin migrating to saltier waters, so they were less vulnerable to Floyd's ill effects. Pollution from runoff was also a significant fear. Numerous pesticides were found in low but measurable quantities in the river waters, particularly in the Neuse River. Overall, however, the concentration of contaminants was slightly lower than had been measured in Hurricane Fran, likely because Floyd simply dropped more water to dilute them.

When the hurricane hit North Carolina, it flooded hog waste lagoons and released 25 million gallons of manure into the rivers, which contaminated the water supply and reduced water quality. Ronnie Kennedy, Duplin County director for environmental health, said that of 310 private wells he had tested for contamination since the storm, 9 percent, or three times the average across eastern North Carolina, had fecal coliform bacteria. Normally, tests showing any hint of feces in drinking water, an indication that it can be carrying disease-causing pathogens, are cause for immediate action.

FEMA opened 16 disaster recovery centers and a mobile office to assist residents with the application process. The federal government deployed 797 employees to North Carolina, including more than 400 housing inspectors. By a year after Floyd struck North Carolina, the state and federal government had provided $1.9 billion worth of assistance. The largest assistance program was $503 million in low-interest loans from the Small Business Administration, for 12,863 renters, homeowners, and business owners. State and federal resources provided $306.5 million in direct housing assistance. The National Flood Insurance Program paid more than $143 million to 12,843 residents who lost their properties due to floods. For uninsured residents who did not qualify for loans, FEMA provided $92.1 million to 23,873 households in grants. FEMA also provided 2,535 trailers for displaced residents, at the cost of $48 million. The federal government authorized $133.1 million to cover 75% of the cost of repairing and rebuilding public facilities. The Hazard Mitigation Grant Program spent $149.1 million to purchase 2,074 flooded homes and tear them down, preserving the land instead as green space. At the time, it was the largest building buyout program in American history. Rocky Mount had the largest buyout in the state, with 446 homes bought and torn down.

The Hurricane Floyd disaster was followed by what many judged to be a very slow federal response. Fully three weeks after the storm hit, Jesse Jackson complained to FEMA Director James Lee Witt on his CNN program Both Sides Now, "It seemed there was preparation for Hurricane Floyd, but then came Flood Floyd. Bridges are overwhelmed, levees are overwhelmed, whole towns under water ... [it's] an awesome scene of tragedy. So there's a great misery index in North Carolina." Witt responded, "We're starting to move the camper trailers in. It's been so wet it's been difficult to get things in there, but now it's going to be moving very quickly. And I think you're going to see a—I think the people there will see a big difference [within] this next weekend."

=== Pennsylvania ===
In Pennsylvania, 16,442 FEMA applications were received, and by November 19, $26.6 million in aid had been provided. Catholic Charities provided additional assistance to North Carolina, Pennsylvania and New Jersey.

=== Retirement ===
Due to the high impact, extensive damage, and loss of life from the hurricane, the name Floyd was retired by the World Meteorological Organization in the spring of 2000, and it will never again be used for another north Atlantic tropical cyclone. It was replaced with Franklin for the 2005 season.

== See also ==
- Hurricane Dorian
- Hurricane Florence
- Hurricane Irene
- Hurricane Isaias
- List of New Jersey hurricanes
- List of North Carolina hurricanes (1980–1999)
- List of Pennsylvania hurricanes
- List of Virginia hurricanes
- List of wettest tropical cyclones in Massachusetts
- Center for Natural Hazards Research
- Timeline of the 1999 Atlantic hurricane season
