= National Register of Historic Places listings in Laurens County, Georgia =

Location of Laurens County in Georgia

This is a list of properties and districts in Laurens County, Georgia that are listed on the National Register of Historic Places (NRHP).

This National Park Service list is complete through NPS recent listings posted March 21, 2025.

== Current listings ==
	Name on the Register	Image	Date listed	Location	City or town	Description
1	Carnegie Library	Carnegie Library	May 30, 1975 (#75000599)	Jct. of Bellevue/Jackson and Academy Sts. (311 Academy Ave.); 32°32′19″N 82°54′30″W	Dublin	NRHP form incorrectly gives the location as 32°31'20"N, 82°54'28"W. It is a contributing property to the Dublin Commercial Historic District.
2	Dublin Commercial Historic District	Dublin Commercial Historic District	May 22, 2002 (#02000540)	Roughly centered on Jackson Ave. and Lawrence St. 32°32′20″N 82°54′19″W	Dublin	
3	Dublin Veterans Administration Hospital	Dublin Veterans Administration Hospital	December 10, 2018 (#100003205)	1826 Veterans Blvd. 32°32′14″N 82°56′34″W	Dublin	
4	First African Baptist Church	First African Baptist Church	August 16, 2019 (#100004299)	405 Telfair St. 32°32′08″N 82°54′25″W	Dublin	
5	Fish Trap Cut		October 1, 1974 (#74000691)	Address Restricted; 32°28′15″N 82°51′28″W	Dublin	Fish Cut Mounds Fish Trap Cut
6	Sanders Hill		May 28, 1975 (#75000600)	S of Montrose off I-16/GA 404. 1.5 miles SW of Montrose, 5.5 miles W of Dudley. One acre surrounded by dirt road to the west and a fence around the rest (1975 NRHP form). 32°32′20″N 83°09′55″W	Montrose	
7	Stubbs Park-Stonewall Street Historic District	Stubbs Park-Stonewall Street Historic District	November 7, 2002 (#02001293)	Roughly bounded by W. Moore St., Roosevelt St., Bellevue Ave., Marion St., Academy Ave., Lancaster and Thompson Sts. 32°32′07″N 82°54′59″W	Dublin	
8	Emery Thomas Auditorium		May 10, 2022 (#100007698)	100 Riverview Dr. 32°31′28″N 82°53′25″W	Dublin	
9	United States Post Office and Court House	United States Post Office and Court House	June 15, 2018 (#100002569)	100 N Franklin St. 32°32′25″N 82°54′12″W	Dublin	Now the Federal Building and US Courthouse
