= Dublin City School District =

Dublin City School District may refer to:

- Dublin City School District (Ohio)
- Dublin City School District (Georgia)
