= Steve Linton =

American football player (born 2000)

No. 44 – St. Louis Battlehawks
- Position: Defensive end
- Roster status: Active

Personal information
- Born: February 4, 2000 (age 26); Dublin, Georgia, U.S.
- Listed height: 6 ft 4 in (1.93 m)
- Listed weight: 248 lb (112 kg)

Career information
- High school: Dublin (Dublin, Georgia)
- College: Syracuse (2019–2022); Texas Tech (2023); Baylor (2024)
- NFL draft: 2025: undrafted

Career history
- Birmingham Stallions (2025); St. Louis Battlehawks (2026–present)

Steven Saderrick Linton (born February 24, 2000) is an American football defensive end for the St. Louis Battlehawks of the United Football League (UFL). He played college football for the Syracuse Orange, Texas Tech Red Raiders and Baylor Bears.

== Early life ==
Linton attended Dublin High School in Dublin, Georgia. As a senior he notched 67 tackles with 18 being for a loss and nine sacks. Coming out of high school, Linton was rated as a three-star recruit and committed to play college football for the Syracuse Orange over other schools such as Missouri, Arizona State and South Florida.

== College career ==
=== Syracuse ===
As a freshman in 2019, Linton was redshirted. In 2020, he racked up 15 tackles and a fumble recovery in one start for Syracuse. In 2021, Linton played in seven games, recording six tackles with two being for a loss, and a sack. In 2022, he totaled 22 tackles with six being for a loss, three and a half sacks, and two forced fumbles for the Orange. After the season, Linton entered his name into the NCAA transfer portal.

=== Texas Tech ===
Linton transferred to play for the Texas Tech Red Raiders. In week 7 of the 2023 season, he notched three sacks and two forced fumbles in a win over Baylor. Linton finished the 2023 season with 22 tackles with four and a half being for a loss, three sacks, ad two forced fumbles for the Red Raiders. After the season, he entered his name into the NCAA transfer portal.

=== Baylor ===
Linton transferred to play for the Baylor Bears. In week 4 of the 2024 season, he recorded five tackles, two sacks, and a forced fumble versus Colorado. Linton finished his final collegiate season in 2024, appearing in nine games with five starts, where he totaled 25 tackles with seven going for a loss, three sacks, and a fumble recovery. After the season, he declared for the 2025 NFL draft.

== Professional career ==
Pre-draft measurables
Height	Weight	Arm length	Hand span	Wingspan	40-yard dash	10-yard split	20-yard split	20-yard shuttle	Three-cone drill	Vertical jump	Broad jump	Bench press
6 ft 3 3/4 in (1.92 m)	242 lb (110 kg)	34 1/4 in (0.87 m)	9 in (0.23 m)	6 ft 9 1/4 in (2.06 m)	4.81 s	1.64 s	2.78 s	4.45 s	7.25 s	32.5 in (0.83 m)	10 ft 4 in (3.15 m)	21 reps
All values from NFL Combine/Pro Day

=== Birmingham Stallions ===
On May 19, 2025, Linton signed with the Birmingham Stallions of the United Football League (UFL).

=== St. Louis Battlehawks ===
On January 13, 2026, Linton was selected by the St. Louis Battlehawks in the 2026 UFL Draft.
