= Romello Height =

American football player (born 2001)

No. 94 – San Francisco 49ers
- Position: Defensive end
- Roster status: Active

Personal information
- Born: April 13, 2001 (age 25); Dublin, Georgia, U.S.
- Listed height: 6 ft 3 in (1.91 m)
- Listed weight: 239 lb (108 kg)

Career information
- High school: Dublin (Dublin, Georgia)
- College: Auburn (2020–2021); USC (2022–2023); Georgia Tech (2024); Texas Tech (2025)
- NFL draft: 2026: 3rd round, 70th overall pick

Career history
- San Francisco 49ers (2026–present)

Awards and highlights
- First-team All-Big 12 (2025)

Career NFL statistics as of Week 10, 2026
- Tackles: 11
- Sacks: 1.5
- Stats at Pro Football Reference

Romello Height (born April 13, 2001) is an American professional football defensive end for the San Francisco 49ers of the National Football League (NFL). He played college football for the Texas Tech Red Raiders, the Auburn Tigers, the USC Trojans and the Georgia Tech Yellow Jackets. Height was selected by the 49ers in the third round of the 2026 NFL draft.

== Early life ==
Height was born on April 13, 2001, in Dublin, Georgia and attended Dublin High School. He was rated as a three-star recruit and committed to play college football for the Miami Hurricanes over other offers from Georgia Tech, Florida, and Kentucky. However, Height later flipped his commitment to play for the Auburn Tigers.

== College career ==
=== Auburn ===
As a freshman in 2020, Height played in just two games. In 2021, he notched 19 tackles with three being for a loss in nine games. After the season, Height entered his name into the NCAA transfer portal.

=== USC ===
Height transferred to play for the USC Trojans. During the 2022 season he appeared in just two games due to a shoulder injury. In 2023, Height recorded 20 tackles with six being for a loss and four sacks. After the season, he once again entered his name into the NCAA transfer portal.

=== Georgia Tech ===
Height transferred to play for the Georgia Tech Yellow Jackets. In week 11 of the 2024 season, he recorded a game-sealing strip sack on Cam Ward to help upset #4 Miami. Height finished the 2024 season with 34 tackles, two and a half sacks, two forced fumbles, and an interception. After the season, he again entered his name into the NCAA transfer portal for his final season of eligibility.

=== Texas Tech ===
On December 19, 2024, Height transferred to play for the Texas Tech Red Raiders.

=== College statistics ===
Legend
**Bold**	Career high

Season	Team	GP	Solo	Ast	Tot	Loss	Sk	Pd	FF	FR	TD
2020	Auburn	1	0	0	0	0.0	0.0	0	0	0	0
2021	Auburn	9	6	13	19	3.0	0.0	0	0	0	0
2022	USC	2	0	0	0	0.0	0.0	0	0	0	0
2023	USC	**12**	11	9	20	6.0	4.0	0	0	**1**	0
2024	Georgia Tech	**12**	**18**	**16**	**34**	6.5	2.5	0	**2**	0	0
2025	Texas Tech	**12**	**18**	14	32	**10.0**	**9.0**	**1**	**2**	0	0
Total		48	53	52	105	25.5	15.5	1	4	1	0

== Professional career ==
Pre-draft measurables
Height	Weight	Arm length	Hand span	Wingspan	40-yard dash	10-yard split	20-yard split	Vertical jump	Broad jump
6 ft 2 3/4 in (1.90 m)	239 lb (108 kg)	32 1/4 in (0.82 m)	9 1/2 in (0.24 m)	6 ft 7 3/8 in (2.02 m)	4.64 s	1.63 s	2.71 s	39.0 in (0.99 m)	10 ft 5 in (3.18 m)
All values from NFL Combine

Height was selected in the third round of the 2026 NFL draft with the 70th pick overall by the San Francisco 49ers.
