= Eleanor Ison Franklin =

American endocrinologist

Eleanor L. Ison Franklin
- Born: Eleanor Lutia Ison; December 24, 1929; Dublin, Georgia, U.S.
- Died: October 2, 1998 (aged 68)
- Education: University of Wisconsin–Madison (PhD)
- Scientific career
- Fields: Endocrinology
- Institutions: Howard University College of Medicine; Tuskegee Institute

Eleanor Lutia Ison Franklin (1929 – 1998) was an American endocrinologist and medical physiologist.

== Early life and education ==
Eleanor Lutia Ison was born on December 24, 1929, in Dublin, Georgia to musician and teacher Rose Mae Oliver and Luther Lincoln Ison, a mathematician and teacher. She attended segregated schools in Quitman, Georgia and Tuscumbia, Alabama. When she was 14 years old, she was valedictorian at Carver High School in Walton County. She started attending Spelman College at the age of 15. She took physics and chemistry courses at Morehouse College. She graduated from Spelman magna cum laude with a degree in biology in 1948. She then attended the University of Wisconsin–Madison, earning her MS in zoology in 1951. She returned to Spelman and taught for two years to help her family. She returned to the University of Wisconsin and earned her PhD in endocrinology in 1957.

== Academic career ==
Franklin was hired by the Tuskegee Institute's Veterinary School. She taught pharmacology and physiology. She was hired by Howard University College of Medicine as an endocrinologist in 1963. After her colleague Anna Epps moved to New Orleans, Ison-Franklin was asked to assume her duties for the Academic Reinforcement Program of the medical school. She later became the associate dean for academic affairs in 1970 and was the first woman to become a dean at the school. She gained full professorship in 1971.

Franklin returned to the physiology department in 1980.

Franklin conducted research at Howard. Her findings on hypertension and cardiovascular physiology were published in the New England Journal of Medicine. She received grants from the National Institutes of Health, NASA's Ames Research Center and the Washington Heart Association.

She co-chaired the American Physiology Society's committee for the Porter Physiology Development Fellowship from 1984 to 1998, and occasionally "almost singlehandedly ran the Porter program from her office at Howard University". Franklin was also a member of the National Academy of Sciences and the Howard University Board of Trustees. She served as president of Spelman College's National Alumnae Association and director of the Women's National Bank of Washington.

She died after a heart attack on October 2, 1998.

The American Physiology Society's highest-ranked applications for the Porter Physiology Development Fellowship are designated Eleanor Ison Franklin Fellows.

== Personal life ==
Franklin married George Franklin in 1965 and had a son.
