= Dublin High School (Georgia) =

Public high school in Dublin, Georgia, United States

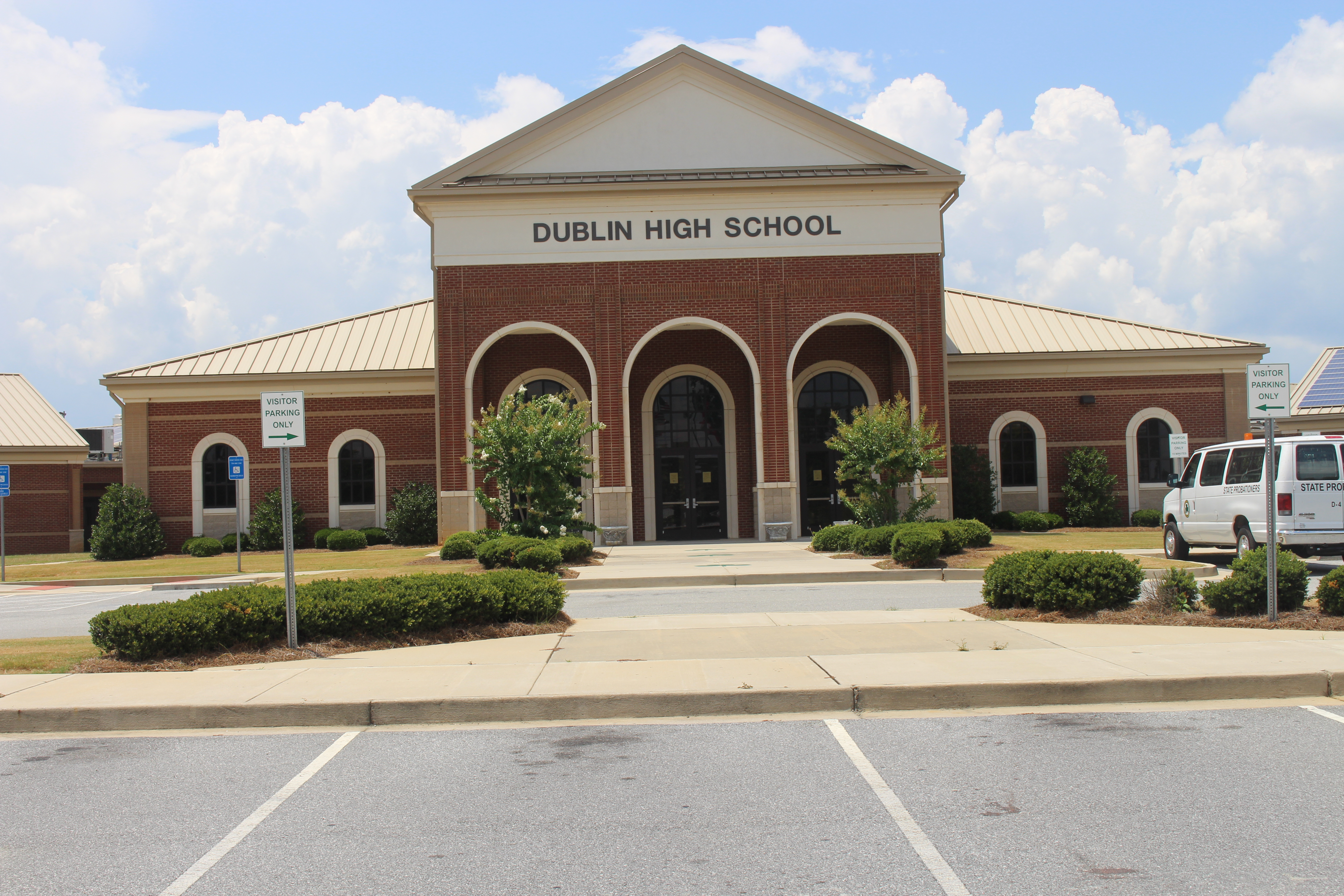

Location
- 1127 Hillcrest Parkway; Dublin, Georgia 31021-3646; United States; 32°32′31″N 82°56′45″W

Information
- School type: Public
- School district: Dublin City School District
- Principal: Jamie Paulk
- Teaching staff: 62.30 (on an FTE basis)
- Grades: 9-12
- Enrollment: 589 (2023-2024)
- Student to teacher ratio: 9.45
- Colors: Green and gold
- Fight song: When Irish Eyes Are Smiling
- Athletics conference: GHSA A-D1
- Nickname: Fighting Irish
- Yearbook: The Reflector
- Website: dhs.dcs.irish

Dublin High School is a public high school in Dublin, Georgia, United States. The school serves grades 9-12 for the Dublin City School District.

== Demographics ==
The demographic breakdown of the 616 students enrolled for 2017-18 was:

- Male - 48.7%
- Female - 51.3%
- Asian - 1.0%
- Black - 90.6%
- Hispanic - 1.1%
- Native Hawaiian/Pacific islanders - 0.2%
- White - 5.0%
- Multiracial - 2.1%

100% of the students were eligible for free or reduced-cost lunch. For 2017–18, this was a Title I school.

== Athletics ==
The following sports are offered at Dublin:

- Baseball (boys')
- Basketball (boys' & girls')
  - Boys State Champions - 2006 & 2009
- Cheerleading (girls')
  - State Champions - 1999
- Cross country (boys' & girls')
- Football (boys')
  - State champions - 1959, 1960, 1963, 2006 (tied), 2019
- Golf (boys' & girls')
  - Boys' state champion - 1962, 1964, & 1965
- Soccer (boys' & girls')
- Softball (girls')
  - Slow-pitch state champions - 1996 & 1997
- Tennis (boys' & girls')
- Track & field (boys' & girls')
  - Boys State Champions - 1951
- Volleyball (girls')
- Wrestling (boys')
  - State champion (Traditional) - 2002, 2004
  - State champion (Dual) - 2004

== Notable alumni ==
- Steve Linton (2019), professional football player
- Romello Height (2020), college football defensive end for the Texas Tech Red Raiders
