= Naval Medical Research Unit Four =

Former US Navy research unit

Coordinates: 42°18′28.8″N 87°50′10.7″W

NAVAL MEDICAL RESEARCH UNIT NO. 4, GREAT LAKES, ILLINOIS- TWENTY-FIVE YEARS 1946-1971

Naval Medical Research Unit Four (NAMRU-4) was a research laboratory of the US Navy which was commissioned 31 May 1946 at the Naval Hospital in Dublin, Georgia as the Mcintire Research Unit for Rheumatic Fever, which was named for the Surgeon General of the United States Navy Ross T. Mcintire. Initial staffing was 4 physicians, 4 laboratory technicians and 4 laboratory helpers under the command of LCDR John R. Seal.

Eighteen months after commissioning the Navy transferred Dublin Naval Hospital to the Veterans Affairs system and the Secretary of the Navy re-established NAMRU-4 at Great Lakes Naval Base on the grounds of the Naval Hospital to study acute respiratory diseases in military personnel with a focus on their prevention. Lieutenant Commander Seal remained the Officer in Charge.

The location at Great Lakes made it ideal as this was a large recruit training command with members arriving from all over the United States and being housed in military barracks and therefore would be expected to experience outbreaks of respiratory illness periodically. Diseases studied included:

- Neisseria meningitidis
- Adenoviruses
  An Introduction To NAMRU-4- History and Accomplishments
- Influenza
- Mycoplasma
- Streptococcus and rheumatic fever

In 1954, NAMRU-4 would be the first microbiology lab to ever isolate influenza virus in tissue culture. In the same year, they would be the first lab to ever identify influenza B virus. NAMRU-4 was disestablished in 1974.

== Officers in Charge ==
- Lieutenant Commander J.R. Seal MC, USN 1946-48 (McIntire Research Unit)
- Commander J.R. Seal MC, USN 1948-54 (NAMRU-4)
- Captain K.H. Sessions MC, USN 1954-5
- Captain M.J. Hantover MC, USN 1955-7
- Commander B.F. Gundlefinger MC, USN 1957-8
- Captain L.F. Miller MC, USN 1958-1964
- Commander C.H. Miller MC, USN 1964-1964
- Captain R O Peckinpaugh MC, USN 1964-1968

== Commanding officers ==
- Captain R O Peckinpaugh MC, USN 1968-1972
- Captain C.H. Miller MC, USN 1972-1974
