= Sanders Hill =

Historic house in Georgia, US

- U.S. National Register of Historic Places
- Location within Georgia
- Location: Off I-16/GA 404, 1.5 miles SW of Montrose, Georgia
- Coordinates: 32.5389°N 83.1653°W
- Area: 1 acre (0.40 ha)
- Built: 1903
- Built by: Sanders, John M.
- Architectural style: Saltbox-related
- NRHP reference No.: 75000600
- Added to NRHP: May 28, 1975

Sanders Hill, also known as Overhome, near Montrose in Laurens County, Georgia, is a house built in 1903, constructed of Georgia heart pine, as a copy of a house from early in the prior century which was destroyed c.1900. It is located about 1.5 miles (2.4 km) southwest of Montrose off I-16/GA 404, about 5.5 miles (8.9 km) west of Dudley. The house was listed on the National Register of Historic Places in 1975. The structure's architectural style was then "quite similar to the 'saltbox' style popular in New England but rare in the Middle Georgia area."

It was home of its builder, John M. Sanders, who was Judge of the "Harvard Militia District" in Laurens County. The house, 20 miles (32 km) from the courthouse in Dublin, Georgia, was the location of many business and legal transactions. The judge conducted numerous marriages in the house's front room at its southwest corner, including presiding over the marriage of Mabel, his daughter, to Claude Gross Wade in 1913. According to the NRHP nomination, Wade, a successful farmer, "eventually became President of the Federal Land Bank, and was largely responsible for the planting of the millions of pine trees which altered the vegetative cover of this area of our country."

The property is one acre surrounded by a dirt road to the west and a fence around the rest.
