= Carnegie Library (Dublin, Georgia) =

Historic library in the US

- U.S. National Register of Historic Places
- U.S. Historic district – Contributing property
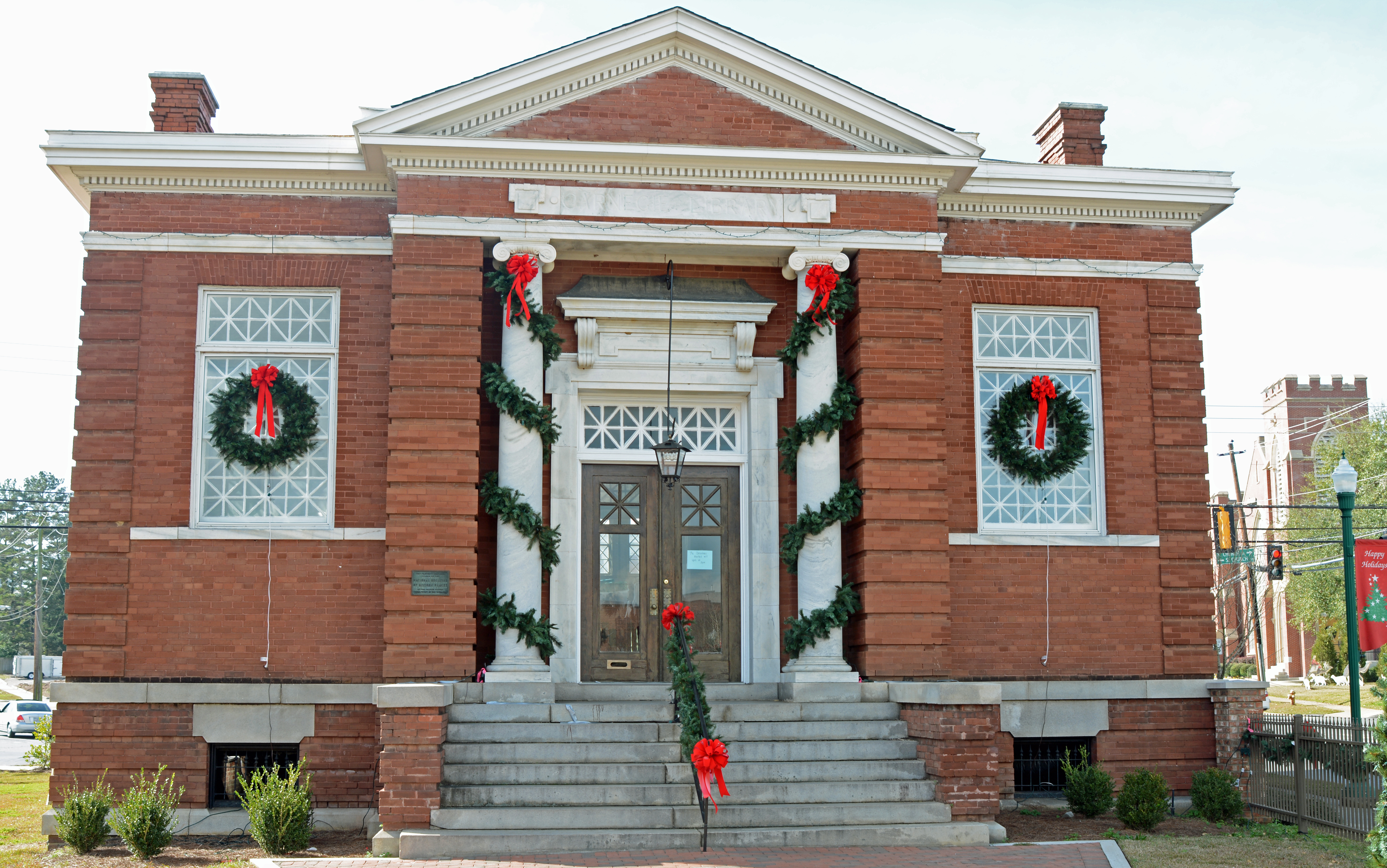
- The library in 2015

- Location within Georgia
- Location: Jct. of Bellevue, Academy, and Jackson Sts., Dublin, Georgia
- Coordinates: 32.53864°N 82.90829°W
- Area: less than one acre
- Built: 1904
- Architects: Morgan, Thomas H.; Dillon, John R.
- Architectural style: Neo-classical
- Part of: Dublin Commercial Historic District (ID02000540)
- NRHP reference No.: 75000599

Significant dates
- Added to NRHP: May 30, 1975
- Designated CP: May 22, 2002

The Carnegie Library in Dublin, Georgia is a building built in 1904. The funding for the building was provided largely by the philanthropist Andrew Carnegie who offered $10,000 as part of his educational program. The architectural company of Bruce, Morgan, and Dillon designed the building, and John A. Kelley was contracted for the construction.

From 1904 to the 1960s it was used as the central library for the City of Dublin. From the 1970s through 2014, the building was home to the Laurens County Historical Society and Museum.

== Access and conservation ==
The building was listed on the National Register of Historic Places in 1975. It is included as a contributing building in the Dublin Commercial Historic District, National Register-listed in 2002.

It is currently used as a special event space and art gallery managed by the Dublin Downtown Development Authority.
