= Imagene Stewart =

American bishop

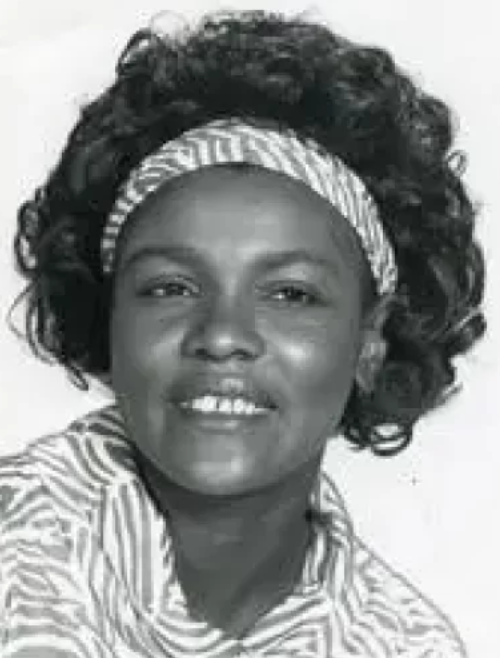
- Stewart in a 1981 publication of the Federal Women's Program
- Born: Imagene Bigham; September 23, 1942; Dublin, Georgia, U.S.
- Died: May 30, 2012 (aged 69)
- Occupations: Baptist minister, activist

Imagene Bigham Stewart (September 23, 1942 – May 30, 2012) was an American minister and activist. She ran the House of Imagene Shelter and Women's Center in Washington, D.C.

== Early life and education ==
Stewart was born in Dublin, Georgia, the daughter of J. C. Bigham and Mattie Watkins Bigham. Her father was a pastor. She graduated from Washington Technical Institute and the Wesley Theological Seminary.

== Career ==
=== Church work and leadership ===
Stewart joined the Southern Christian Leadership Conference as a young woman and attended the 1963 March on Washington. She was one of the first women ordained in the National Baptist Convention denomination and had her own congregation, the Greater Pearly Gate Full Gospel Baptist Church. In 1969, she co-founded the Afro-American Women's Clergy Association and was president of the association in the 1990s. She hosted a Sunday morning radio show. In 1996, she was made a bishop in the Full Gospel Baptist Church Fellowship denomination.

=== House of Imagene shelters ===
In 1972, drawing from her own experience of homelessness, Stewart opened the House of Imagene, a shelter serving homeless veterans. She preached and served free meals on troubled street corners. In 1974 she opened a women's shelter for domestic violence survivors, in Prince George's County, Maryland. In 1981, she received an Outstanding Women of the Year award from the NAACP, for her shelter work.

Stewart accepted no government funding for her shelter program; instead, she courted the attention and support of wealthy and conservative political and military leaders, including the Reagans and Bushes. She attended Ronald Reagan's inaugural ball in 1981, telling a reporter "I may be poor and broke, but there's no sense hanging around with those who are poor and broke." Political commentator Armstrong Williams helped her pay the shelter's back rent in 1997. The House of Imagene struggled financially for years, and permanently closed after a fire in 2010.

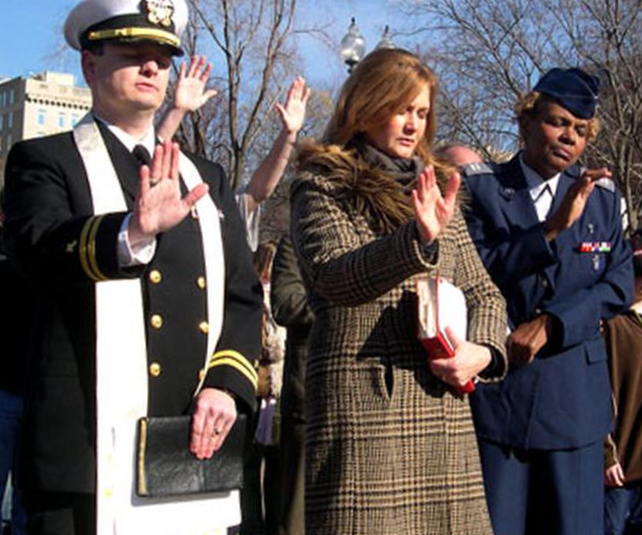
Gordon Klingenschmitt, Katie Mahoney, and Stewart praying at the White House (c. January 2006)

=== Chaplaincy and other work ===
Stewart was an inventory management specialist at the Government Publishing Office in the 1970s. She was the first Black national chaplain to the American Legion Auxiliary, elected in 1993. She was also chaplain to the Tuskegee Airman Civil Air Patrol at Andrews Air Force Base. She officiated at veterans' funerals, and spoke and wrote about honoring the American flag. In 1999, she demonstrated in front of the Justice Department with other religious leaders, seeking an investigation into the FBI's response at Waco in 1993.

== Personal life ==
Stewart's first husband was Lucius Johnson; they married in 1958. Her second husband was Albert Stewart. She had two sons. She died in 2012, at the age of 69, from ovarian cancer.
