= Emery Thomas Auditorium =

Historic auditorium in Georgia, U.S.

- U.S. National Register of Historic Places
- Location within Georgia
- Location: Dublin, Georgia
- Coordinates: 32.5252°N 82.8907°W
- Built: 1956
- NRHP reference No.: 100007698
- Added to NRHP: May 10, 2022

Emery Thomas Auditorium, built in 1956 and dedicated in 1957, was the first 4-H club built for use by African American youth in Georgia. It is the last remaining structure built for this purpose in the state.

The auditorium was added to the National Register of Historic Places in 2022.
