= Dublin City School District (Georgia) =

School district in Georgia (U.S. state)

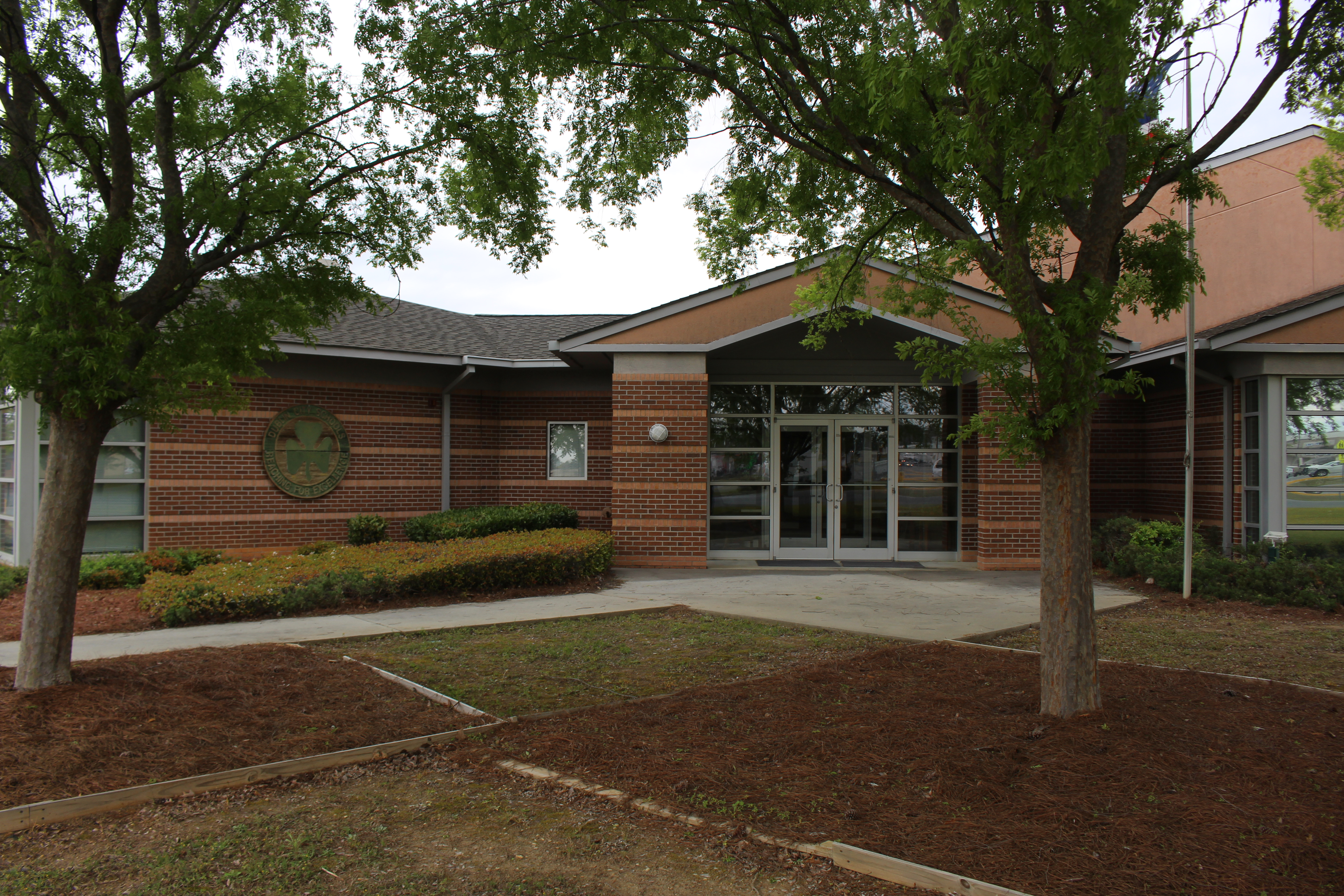
- headquarters

Address
- 207 Shamrock Drive Dublin, Georgia, 31021-3020; United States
- Coordinates: 32.547685°N 82.951896°W

District information
- Grades: Pre-school - 12
- Superintendent: Dr. Fred Williams
- Accreditations: Southern Association of Colleges and Schools; Georgia Accrediting Commission

Students and staff
- Enrollment: 3,262
- Faculty: 231

Other information
- Telephone: (478) 272-3440
- Fax: (478) 272-1249
- Website: dcsirish.com

The Dublin City School District is a public school district in Laurens County, Georgia, United States, based in Dublin. It serves the city limits of Dublin.

== Schools ==
The Dublin City School District has three elementary schools, one middle school, and one high school.

Board of Education: Chairman- John Bell III

                   Vice Chairman- James Lanier
                                  Laura Travick
                                  Peggy Johnson
                                  Kenny Walters
                                Nelson Carswell IV
                                  Bill Perry

Elementary schools:

- Hillcrest Elementary School
- Susie Dasher Elementary School

Secondary schools:

- Dublin Middle School
- Dublin High School

Elementary/Secondary: (K - 8th grade)

- THE IRISH GIFTED ACADEMY

For early college and career ready students seeking to enter into their post-secondary education or the workforce:

- Heart of Georgia College & Career Academy
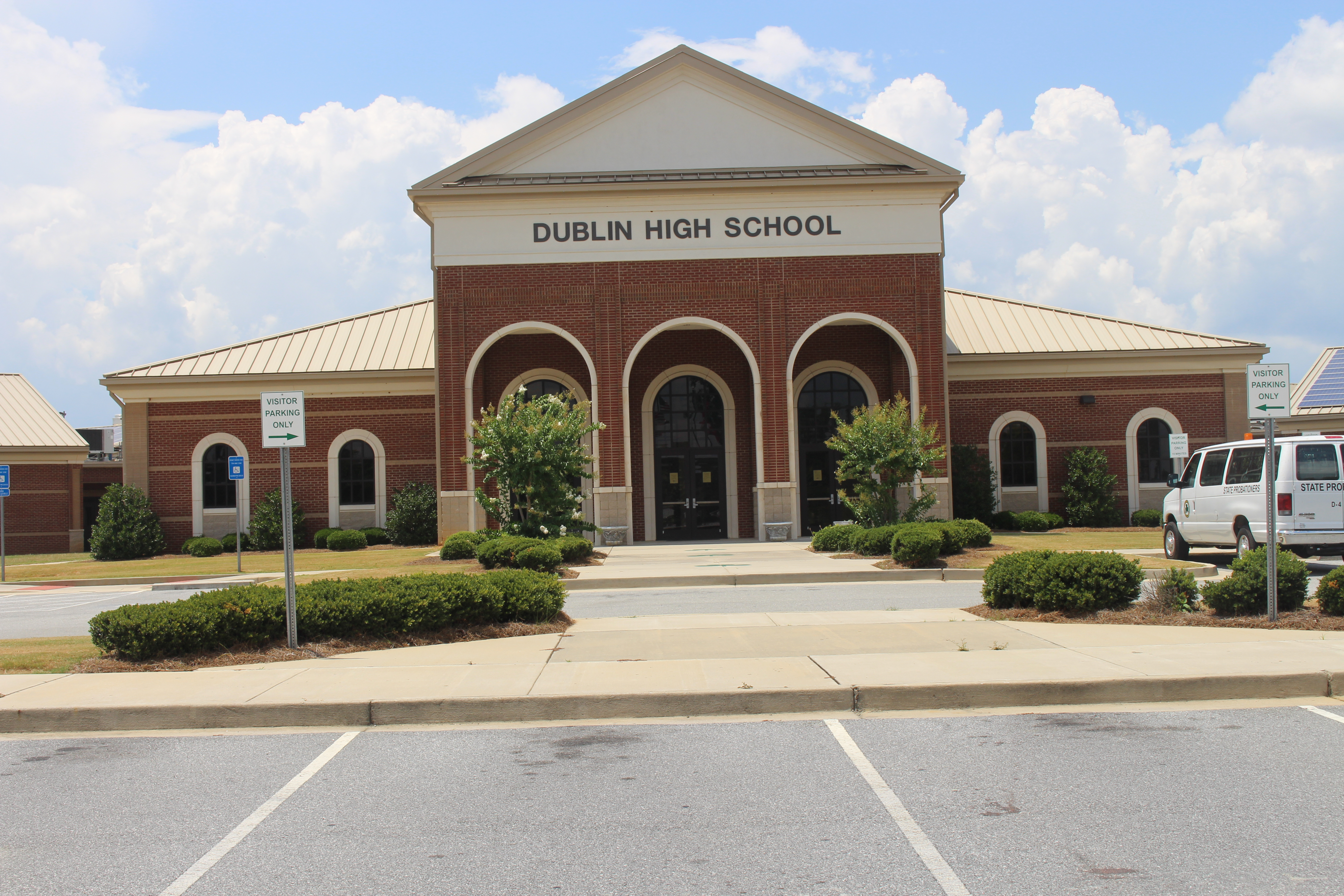
Dublin High School

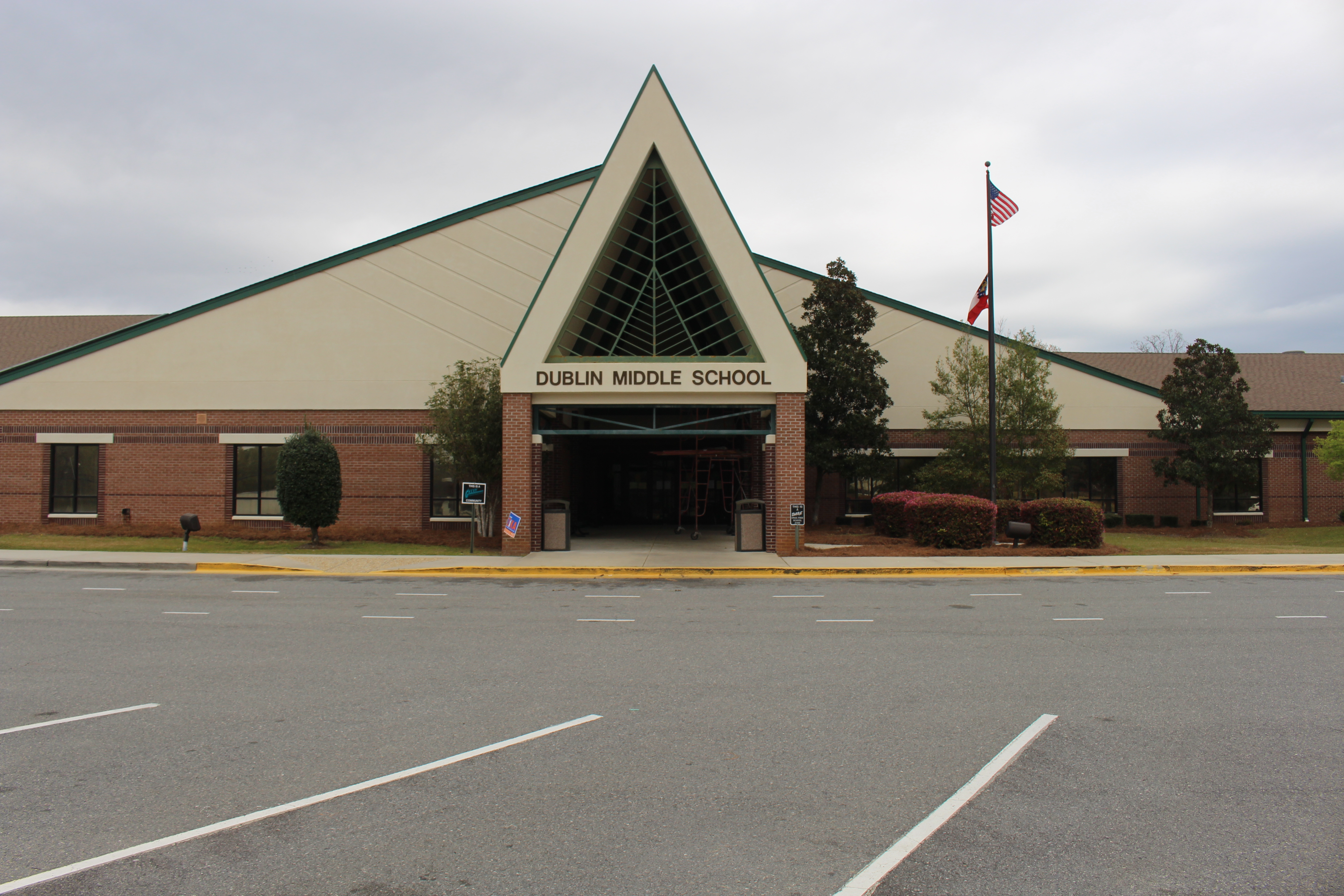
Dublin Middle School

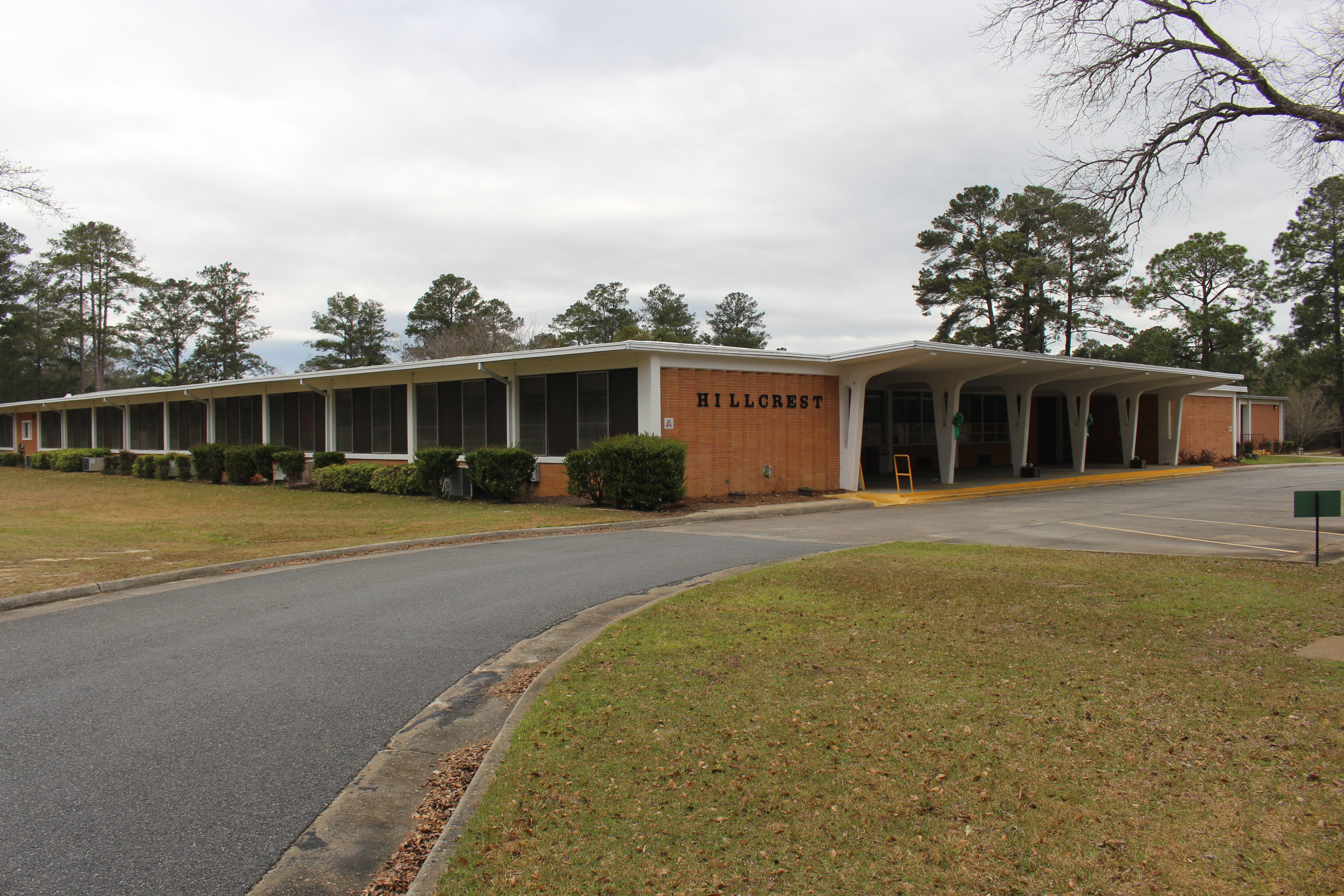
Hillcrest Elementary School

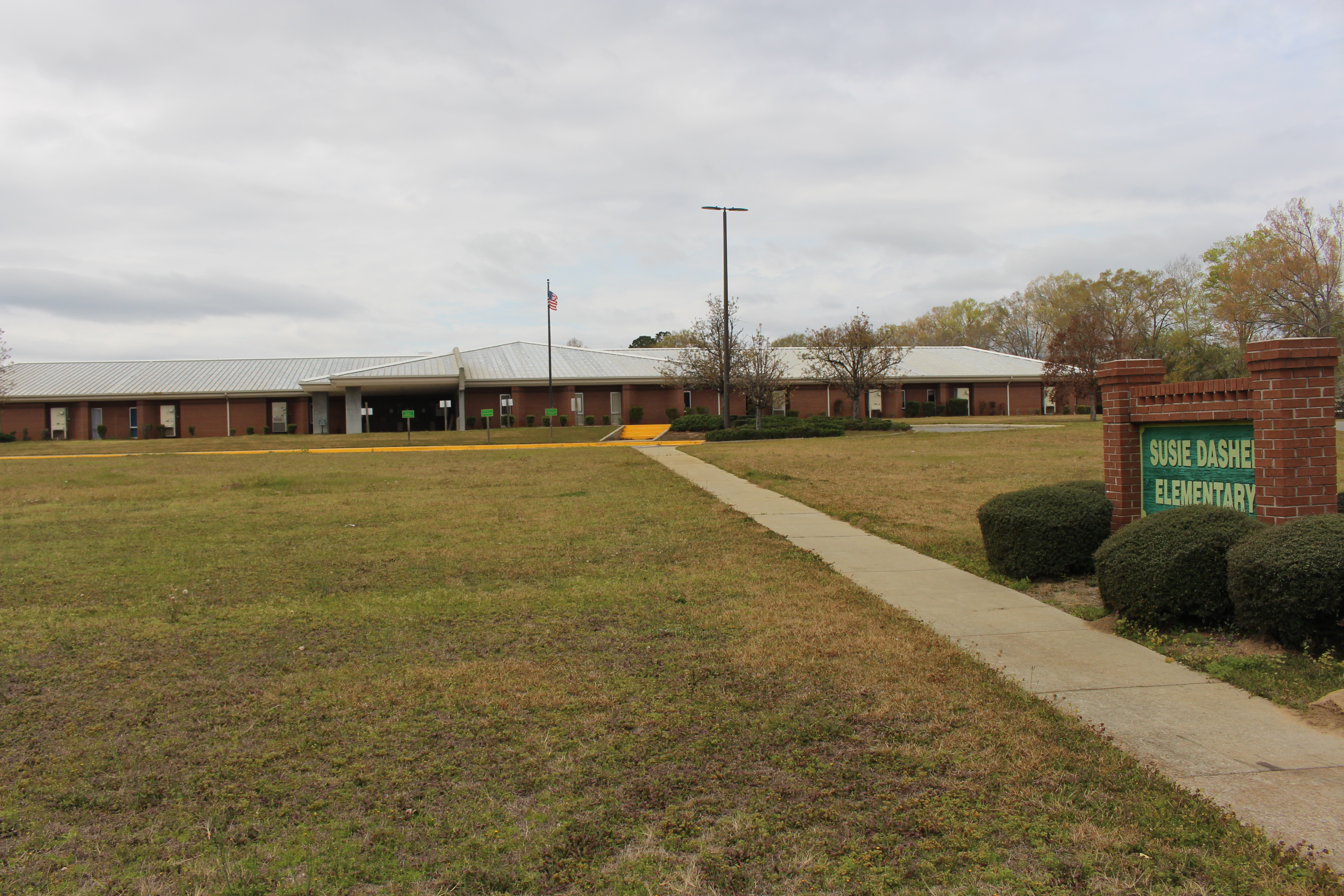
Susie Dasher Elementary School

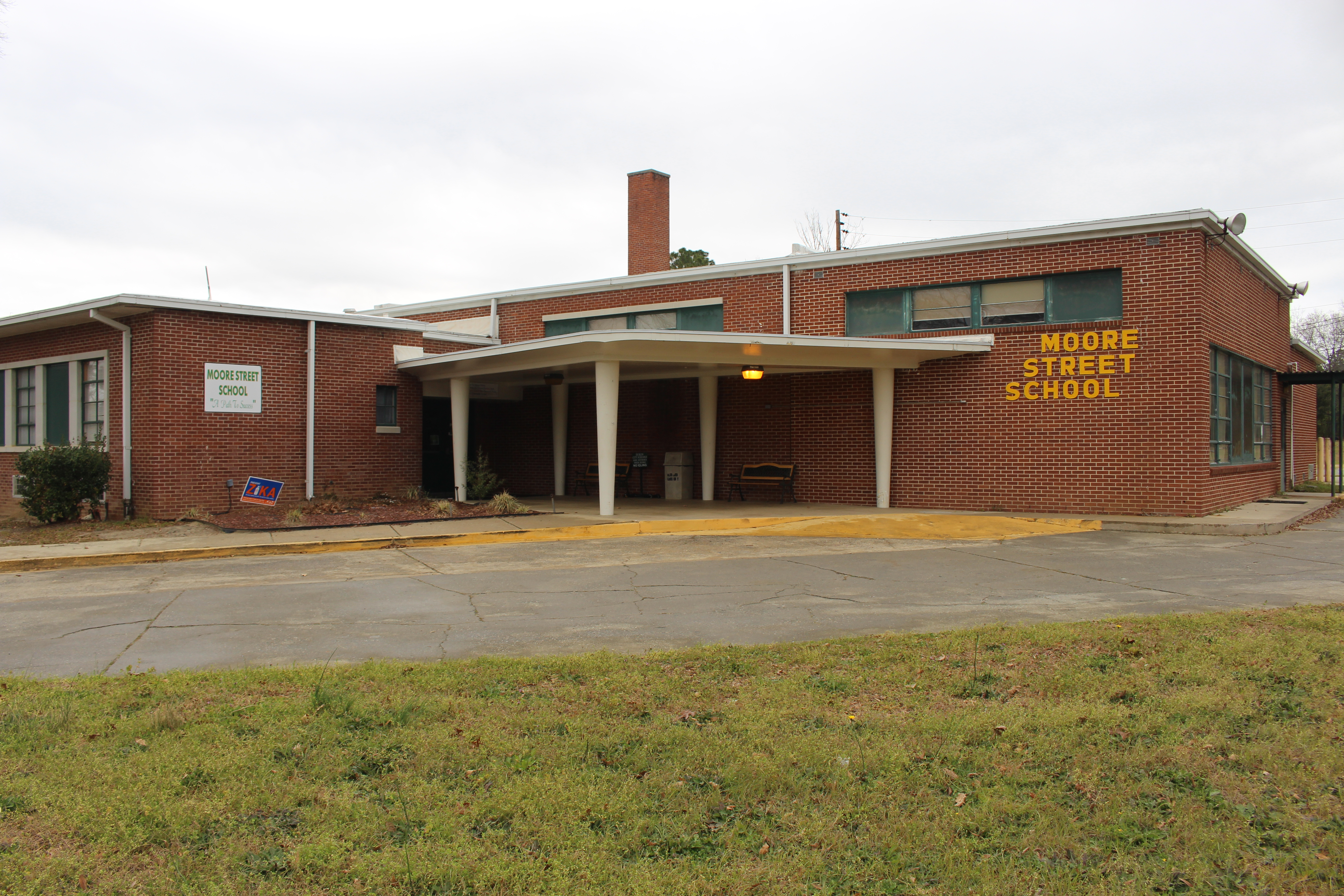
Moore Street School
