= Dublin Commercial Historic District =

Historic district in Georgia, United States

- U.S. National Register of Historic Places
- U.S. Historic district
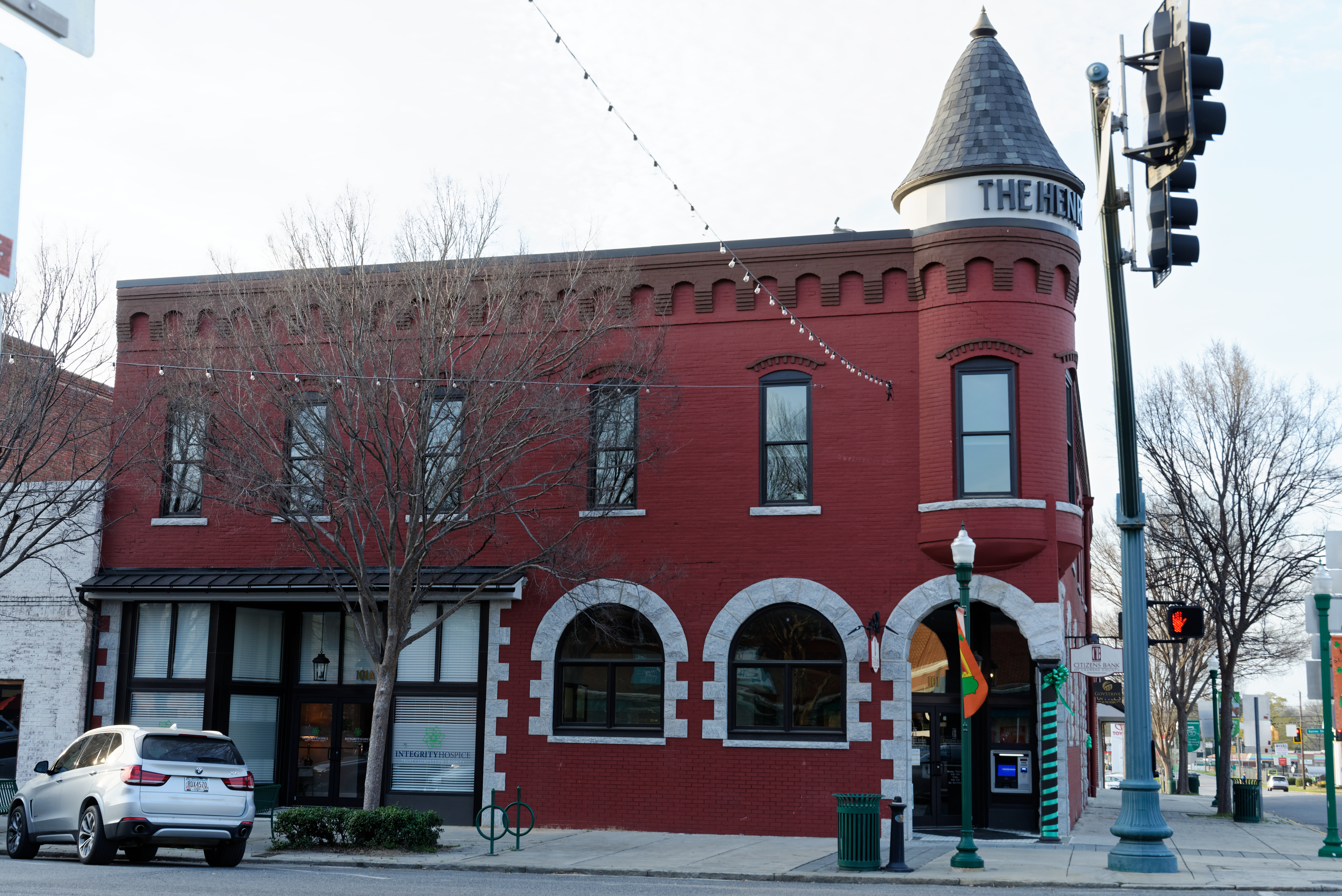
- The Henry Building, corner of Jackson and Jefferson

- Location within Georgia
- Location: Roughly centered on Jackson Ave. and Lawrence St., Dublin, Georgia
- Coordinates: 32.538889°N 82.905278°W
- Area: 32 acres (13 ha)
- Architect: A. Ten Eyck Brown, others
- Architectural style: Mid 19th Century Revival, Late Victorian
- NRHP reference No.: 02000540
- Added to NRHP: May 22, 2002

The Dublin Commercial Historic District is a 32 acres (13 ha) historic district roughly centered on Jackson Ave. and Lawrence St. in Dublin in Laurens County, Georgia. It was listed on the National Register of Historic Places in 2002. The district included 76 contributing buildings, one contributing structure, and one contributing object.

It covers the historic core of the town of Dublin, which was incorporated in 1812 and was laid out in a gridiron pattern. Streets were named after U.S. presidents and after Revolutionary War and War of 1812 heroes.

The town plan

is an example of the Sparta-type county seat plan. The Sparta plan features a central courthouse square, but the square is given greater prominence by aligning major streets to run directly towards its center. This may occur on all four sides of the square, or as is the case in Dublin, two streets may approach the center while others intersect at the corners. The town was laid out in a gridiron pattern with the courthouse at the east end of Jackson Avenue, the main east-west street in the central business district that runs directly to the center of the square. The nonhistoric Laurens County courthouse, constructed in 1962, occupies the west side of the square while the Federal Building and United States Courthouse [constructed in 1936 and later renamed for J. Roy Rowland] occupies the east side.

Notable buildings include:

- Christ Episcopal Church (1898), Gothic Revival
- Carnegie Library (1904), Neoclassical style, designed by Atlanta architects Morgan and Dillon, separately NRHP-listed
- First National Bank Building (1912), Classical Revival, seven stories tall (the tallest building in the district).
