= Stubbs Park–Stonewall Street Historic District =

Historic district in Georgia, United States

- U.S. National Register of Historic Places
- U.S. Historic district
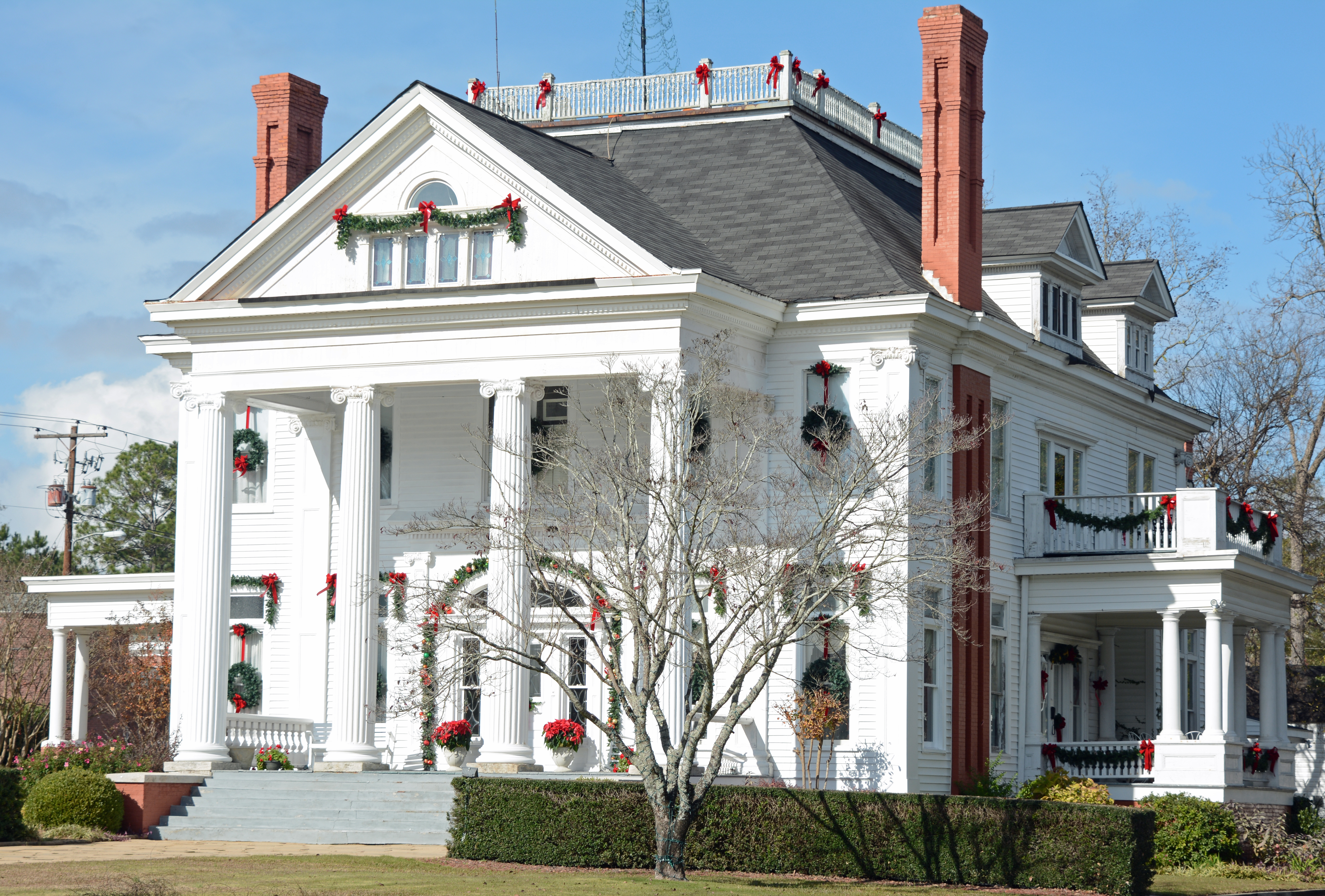
- House on Bellevue Ave

- Location within Georgia Location within the United States
- Location: Roughly bounded by W. Moore St., Roosevelt St., Bellevue Ave., Marion St., Academy Ave., Lancaster and Thompson Sts., Dublin, Georgia
- Coordinates: 32.5352°N 82.9165°W
- Area: 435 acres (176 ha)
- Built: 1873
- Architect: Berckman, Prosper Julius; et.al.
- Architectural style: Late Victorian, Late 19th And 20th Century Revivals
- NRHP reference No.: 02001293
- Added to NRHP: November 7, 2002

The Stubbs Park–Stonewall Street Historic District in Dublin, Georgia is a residential area that was listed on the National Register of Historic Places in 2002. The district has been a residential neighborhood since the 1910s and is bounded by West Moore Street, Lancaster Street, Marion Street, Academy Avenue and Roosevelt Street. The Dublin Historic Neighborhood Association was formed in 1995 to preserve and improve the neighborhood.

== Houses on Bellevue Avenue ==
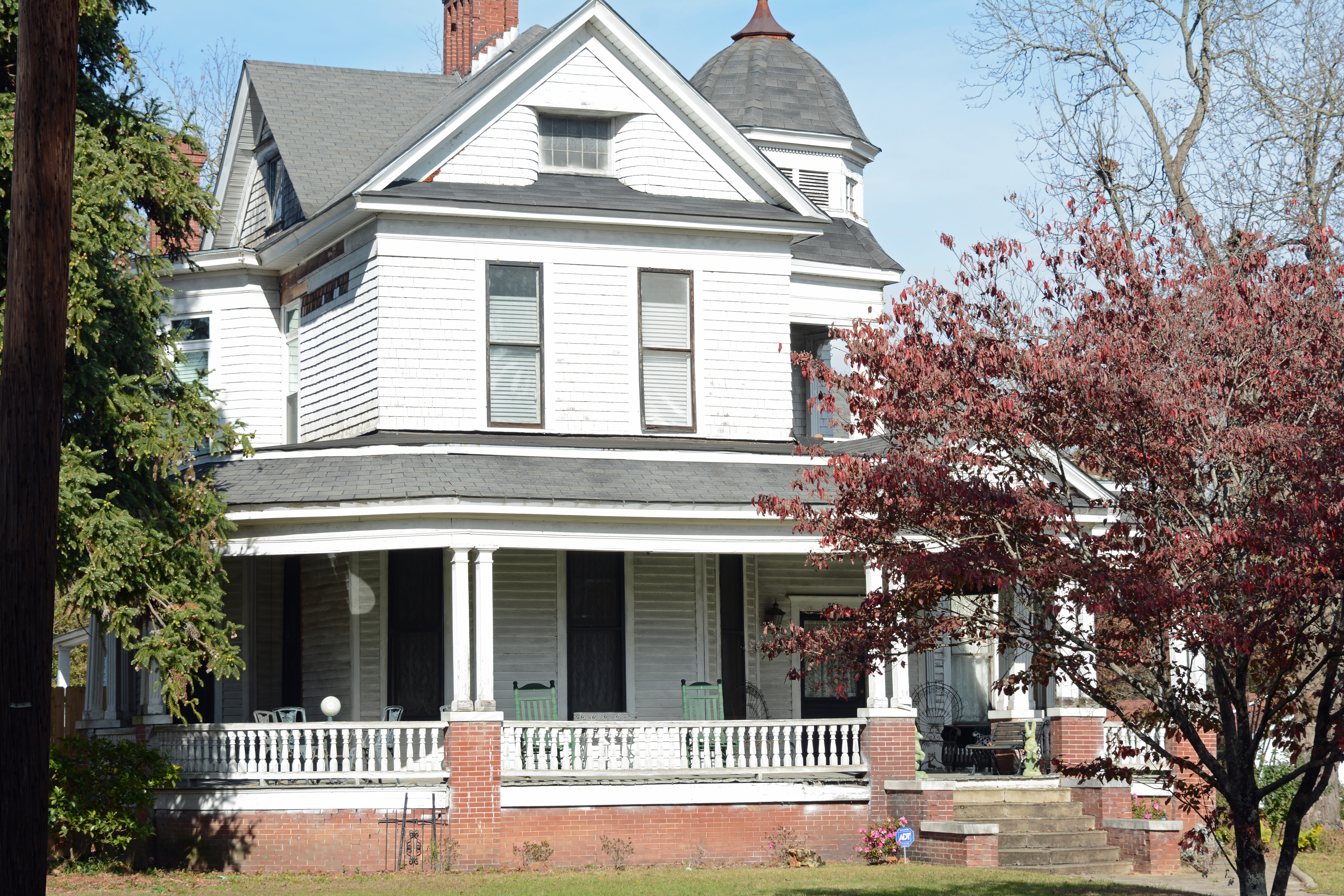

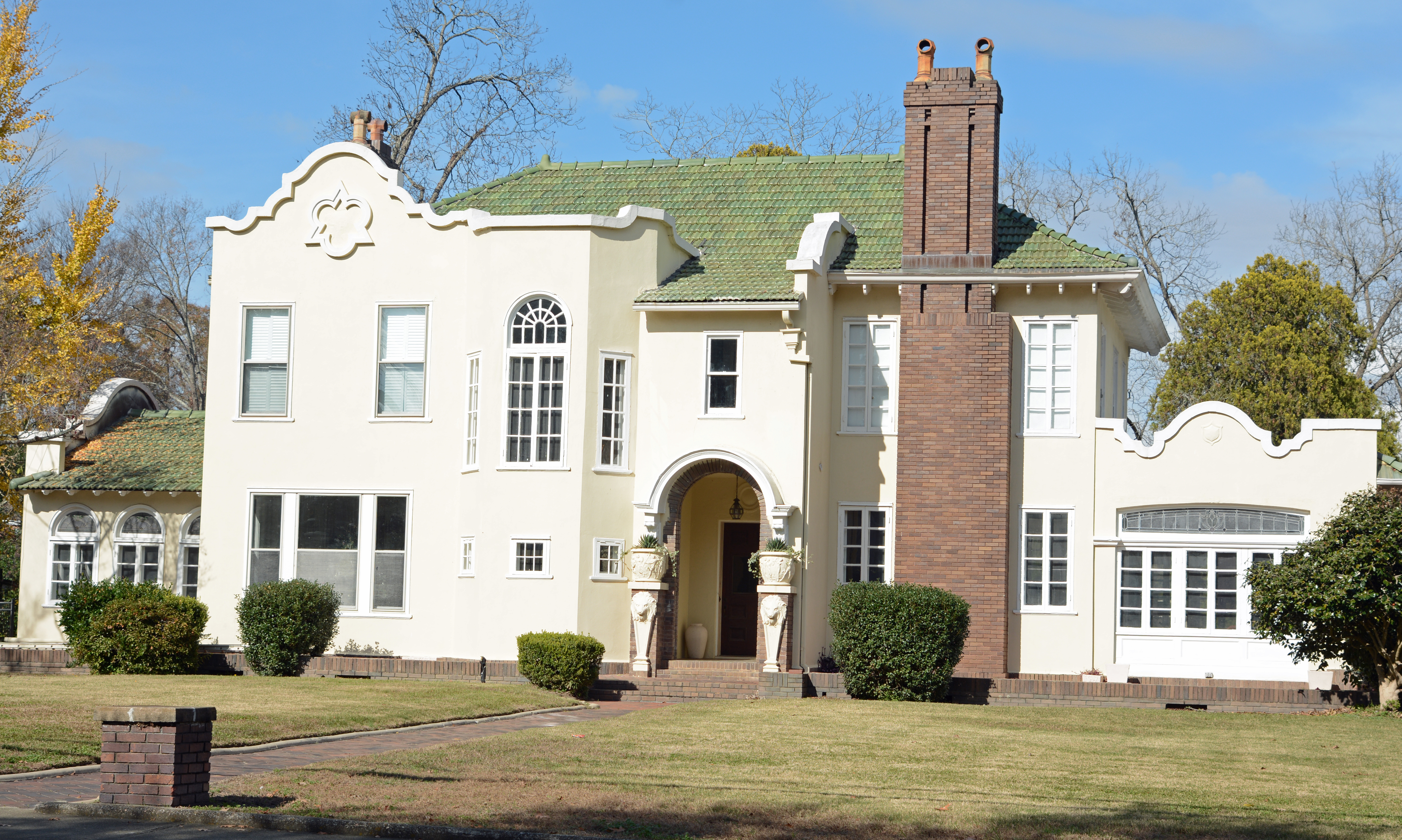

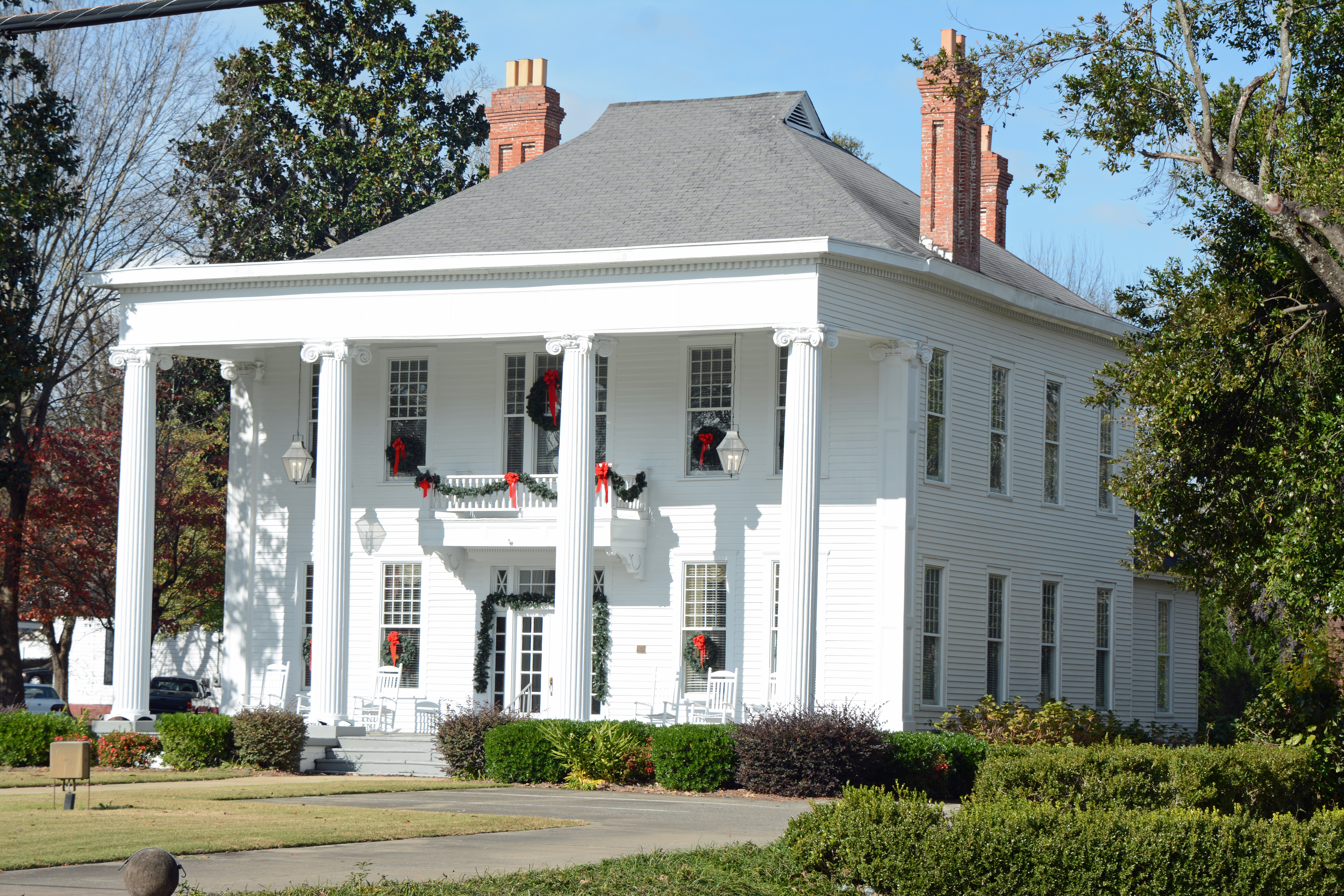

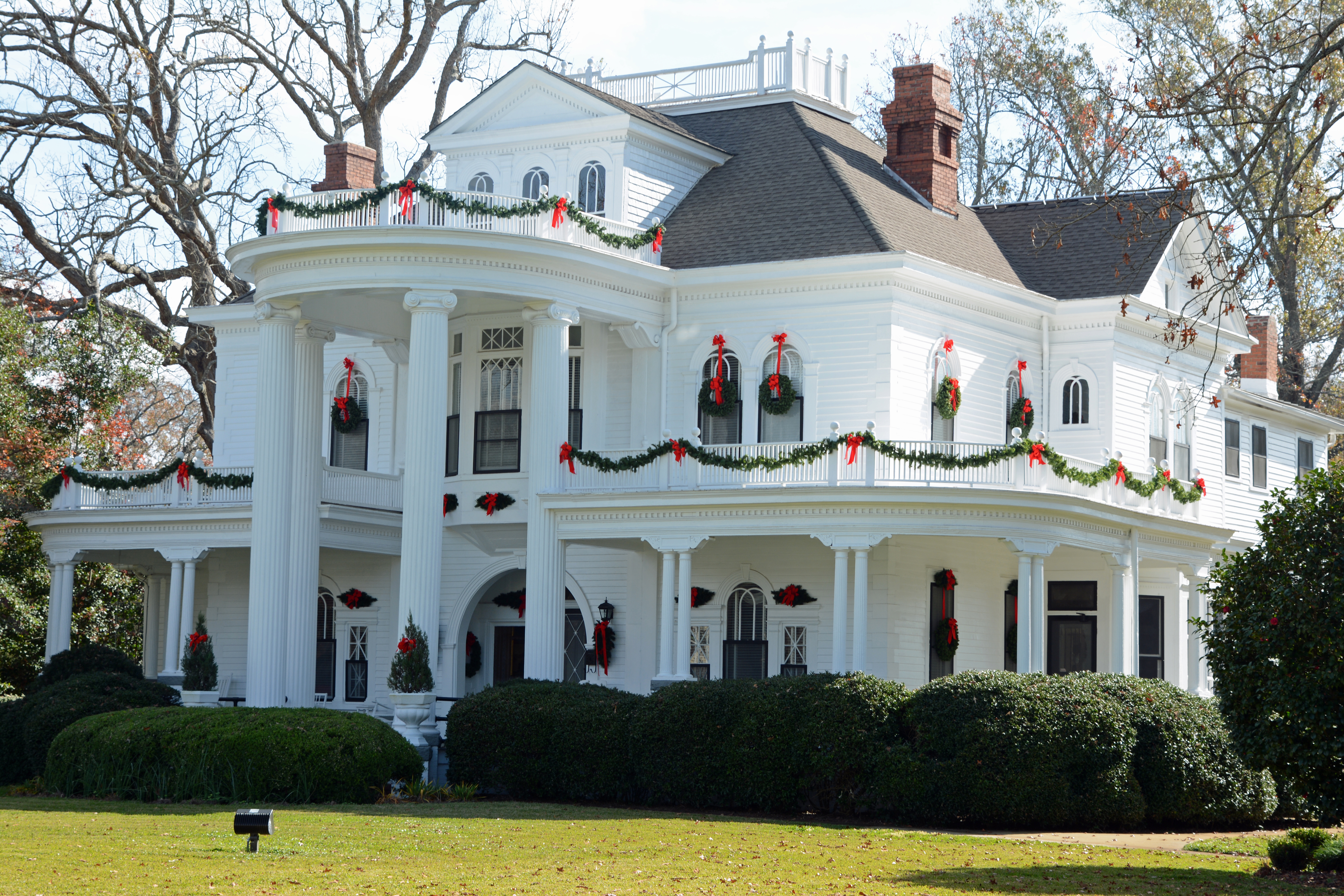

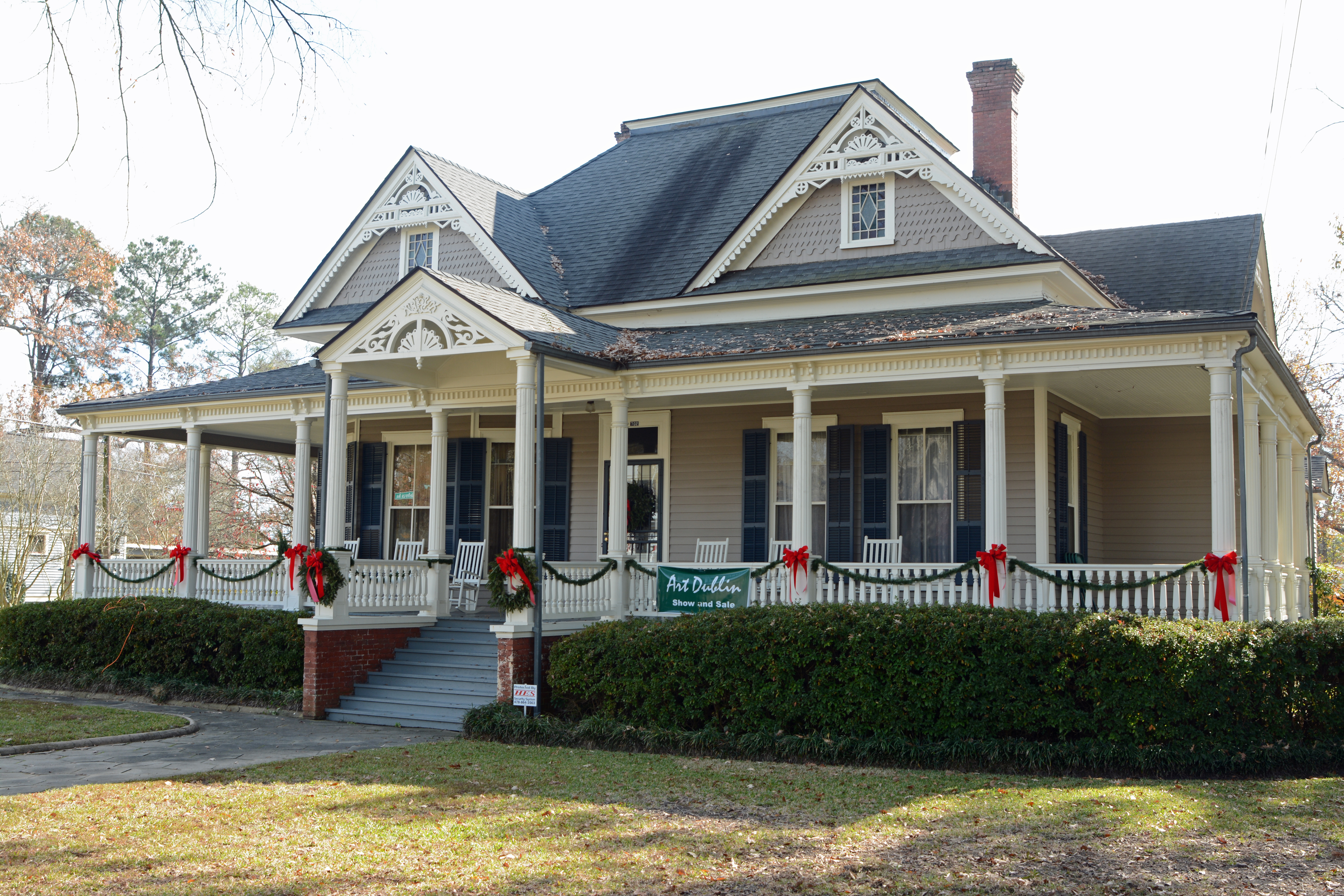
