= Dublin, Georgia =

- City
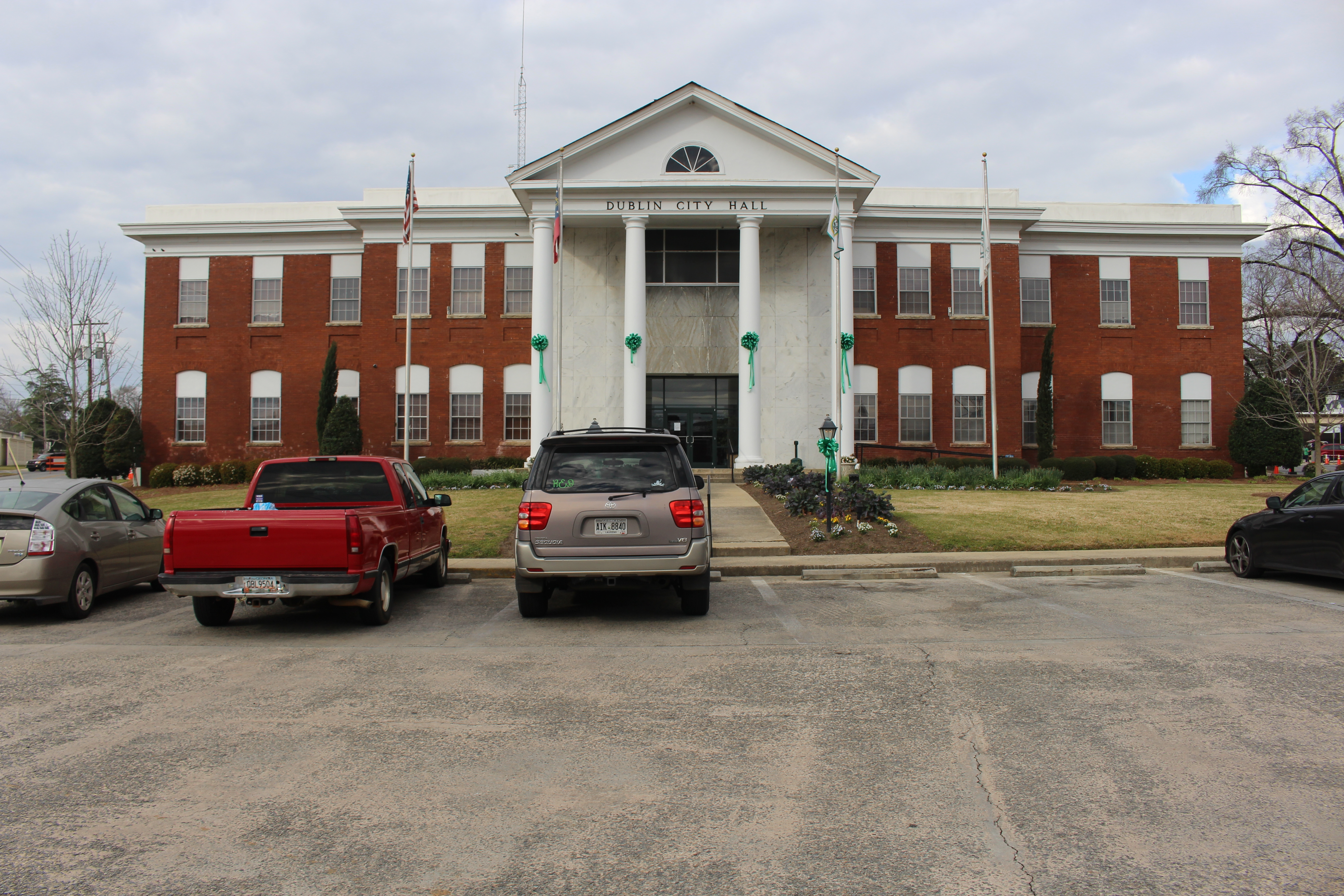
- Dublin City Hall

- Flag Seal
- Nickname: The Emerald City
- Location in Laurens County and the state of Georgia
- Coordinates: 32°32′26″N 82°54′14″W
- Country: United States
- State: Georgia
- County: Laurens
- Incorporated: December 9, 1812

Government
  - Mayor: Joshua Kight
  - City manager: Josh Powell (interim)

Area
  - City: 16.401 sq mi (42.478 km^{2})
  - Land: 16.306 sq mi (42.232 km^{2})
  - Water: 0.095 sq mi (0.245 km^{2})
- Elevation: 223 ft (68 m)

Population (2020)
  - City: 16,074
  - Estimate (2022): 15,946
  - Density: 999/sq mi (385.7/km^{2})
  - Urban: 20,842
  - Metro: 59,223
- Time zone: UTC−5 (Eastern (EST))
  - Summer (DST): UTC−4 (EDT)
- ZIP Codes: 31021, 31027, 31040
- Area code: 478
- FIPS code: 13-24376
- GNIS feature ID: 0313692
- Website: cityofdublin.org

Dublin is a city in and the county seat of Laurens County, Georgia, United States. The population was 16,074 at the 2020 census.

== History ==
The City of Dublin, Georgia was incorporated by the Georgia General Assembly on December 9, 1812, and made the county seat of Laurens County, Georgia. The original postmaster, Jonathan Sawyer, named the town Dublin after the capital of his Irish homeland, Dublin, Ireland.

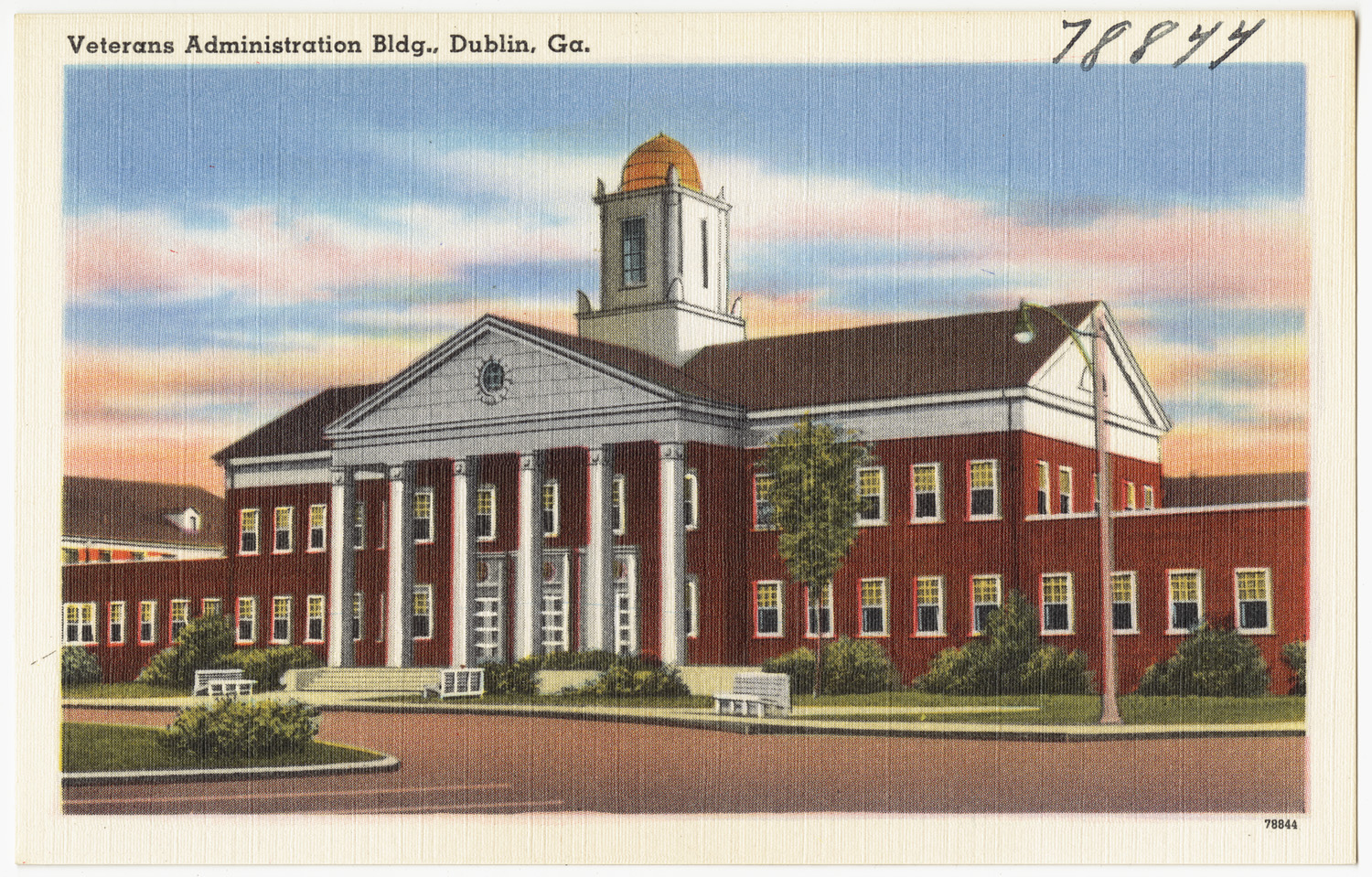
Old postcard showing the Veterans Administration building

Dublin, according to a historical marker at the town's main Oconee River bridge, was one of the last encampments at which Confederate President Jefferson Davis and his family stayed before being captured by Union forces in May 1865.

Between 1880 and 1910, five railroads connected through Dublin and two bridges were built over the Oconee River. This infrastructure allowed the town to become a major cotton trading and export center for central Georgia. By the early 1920s, however, the boll weevil infestation led to successive cotton crop failures, causing economic collapse and population loss.

On April 17, 1944, Martin Luther King Jr. gave his first public speech, "The Negro and the Constitution" at First African Baptist Church in Dublin.

== Geography ==
Dublin is located in north-central Laurens County. The town, named such because the Middle Georgia Piedmont reminded Irish settlers of terrain in their native country, was founded on the Oconee River, which starts in the foothills of the Blue Ridge Mountains in northern Georgia before combining with the Ocmulgee River to form the Altamaha, a river which then proceeds to its mouth on the Atlantic Ocean. The Oconee forms the eastern boundary of Dublin, separating it from the city of East Dublin.

According to the United States Census Bureau, the town has a total area of 16.0 square miles (41.5 km^{2}), of which 15.9 square miles (41.2 km^{2}) are land and 0.09 square miles (0.24 km^{2}), or 0.59%, are water.

=== Location ===
The city is located in the central part of the state along Interstate 16. Access to the city can be found from exits 49, 51, 54, and 58. Via I-16, Savannah is 117 miles (188 km) east, and Macon is 53 miles (85 km) northwest. US routes 80, 319, and 441 also run through the city. US 441 connects the city to Milledgeville, 47 miles (76 km) northwest, and McRae–Helena, 35 miles (56 km) south. Numerous state and local highways also run through the city.

=== Historic districts ===
Dublin has two historic districts designated by the National Register of Historic Places: the Dublin Commercial Historic District and the Stubbs Park–Stonewall Street Historic District. The Dublin Commercial Historic District consists of the original downtown commercial core, including the earliest extant building in the district: the Hicks Building, dating to 1893. The historic district contains 78 contributing properties, including the Dublin Carnegie Library First National Bank Building, and the former United States Post Office building. Structures within the district represent a wide range of architectural styles, including Colonial Revival, Neoclassical, Commercial, and Art Deco.

The Stubbs Park-Stonewall Street Historic District is located west of Dublin's central business district. The district contains 470 contributing properties, most of which are residential homes constructed between the late 1910s to the early 1940s. The predominant architectural styles of the area consist of Craftsman, Gothic Revival, Folk Victorian, and Georgian Cottage. In addition to historic residences, the district contains properties including historic churches, historic cemeteries, and Dublin's first public park, Stubbs Park.

=== Climate ===
Climate data for Dublin, Georgia, 1991–2020 normals, extremes 1892–present
Month	Jan	Feb	Mar	Apr	May	Jun	Jul	Aug	Sep	Oct	Nov	Dec	Year
Record high °F (°C)	85 (29)	85 (29)	92 (33)	99 (37)	102 (39)	108 (42)	109 (43)	109 (43)	108 (42)	102 (39)	92 (33)	88 (31)	109 (43)
Mean maximum °F (°C)	74.9 (23.8)	78.3 (25.7)	83.8 (28.8)	88.7 (31.5)	94.4 (34.7)	97.8 (36.6)	99.9 (37.7)	98.7 (37.1)	95.3 (35.2)	89.0 (31.7)	83.1 (28.4)	76.9 (24.9)	100.4 (38.0)
Mean daily maximum °F (°C)	58.3 (14.6)	62.0 (16.7)	70.7 (21.5)	78.3 (25.7)	85.6 (29.8)	90.7 (32.6)	94.0 (34.4)	92.2 (33.4)	87.0 (30.6)	77.9 (25.5)	68.5 (20.3)	60.6 (15.9)	77.1 (25.1)
Daily mean °F (°C)	46.7 (8.2)	50.0 (10.0)	57.3 (14.1)	64.5 (18.1)	72.5 (22.5)	79.2 (26.2)	82.5 (28.1)	81.3 (27.4)	75.7 (24.3)	65.4 (18.6)	55.3 (12.9)	48.8 (9.3)	64.9 (18.3)
Mean daily minimum °F (°C)	35.1 (1.7)	38.0 (3.3)	44.0 (6.7)	50.6 (10.3)	59.4 (15.2)	67.7 (19.8)	71.0 (21.7)	70.4 (21.3)	64.4 (18.0)	52.9 (11.6)	42.1 (5.6)	37.0 (2.8)	52.7 (11.5)
Mean minimum °F (°C)	20.0 (−6.7)	23.5 (−4.7)	27.9 (−2.3)	36.0 (2.2)	45.9 (7.7)	58.2 (14.6)	63.6 (17.6)	62.8 (17.1)	51.9 (11.1)	36.8 (2.7)	27.1 (−2.7)	23.4 (−4.8)	18.1 (−7.7)
Record low °F (°C)	0 (−18)	9 (−13)	14 (−10)	28 (−2)	38 (3)	40 (4)	50 (10)	52 (11)	33 (1)	25 (−4)	11 (−12)	5 (−15)	0 (−18)
Average precipitation inches (mm)	4.38 (111)	4.14 (105)	4.58 (116)	2.75 (70)	2.62 (67)	5.25 (133)	4.50 (114)	4.81 (122)	3.58 (91)	3.15 (80)	3.08 (78)	4.43 (113)	47.27 (1,200)
Average precipitation days (≥ 0.01 in)	8.5	6.5	7.4	5.4	5.5	10.1	8.0	8.9	6.1	5.6	5.5	7.0	84.5
Source 1: NOAA
Source 2: XMACIS2/NWS

== Demographics ==
Historical population
Census	Pop.	Note	%±
1880	574		—
1890	862		50.2%
1900	2,987		246.5%
1910	5,795		94.0%
1920	7,707		33.0%
1930	6,681		−13.3%
1940	7,814		17.0%
1950	10,232		30.9%
1960	13,814		35.0%
1970	15,143		9.6%
1980	16,083		6.2%
1990	16,312		1.4%
2000	15,857		−2.8%
2010	16,201		2.2%
2020	16,074		−0.8%
2022 (est.)	15,946	▼	−0.8%
U.S. Decennial Census; 1850-1870 1870-1880; 1890-1910 1920-1930; 1940 1950 1960; 1970 1980 1990; 2000 2010 2020 Census

=== 2020 census ===
As of the 2020 census, Dublin had a population of 16,074. The population density was 1,009.4 inhabitants per square mile (389.7/km^{2}). The median age was 39.3 years. 24.7% of residents were under the age of 18 and 19.9% of residents were 65 years of age or older. For every 100 females there were 84.7 males, and for every 100 females age 18 and over there were 80.4 males age 18 and over.

98.6% of residents lived in urban areas, while 1.4% lived in rural areas.

There were 6,459 households and 3,944 families in Dublin. Of households, 31.0% had children under the age of 18 living in them. Of all households, 29.1% were married-couple households, 20.0% were households with a male householder and no spouse or partner present, and 44.9% were households with a female householder and no spouse or partner present. About 35.0% of all households were made up of individuals, and 15.1% had someone living alone who was 65 years of age or older.

There were 7,224 housing units, of which 10.6% were vacant. The homeowner vacancy rate was 1.8% and the rental vacancy rate was 7.4%.

Dublin racial composition as of 2020
Race	Number	Percent
Black or African American (non-Hispanic)	9,811	61.04%
White (non-Hispanic)	5,144	32.0%
Native American	23	0.14%
Asian	342	2.13%
Pacific Islander	1	0.01%
Other/Mixed	421	2.62%
Hispanic or Latino	332	2.07%

=== Dublin micropolitan statistical area ===
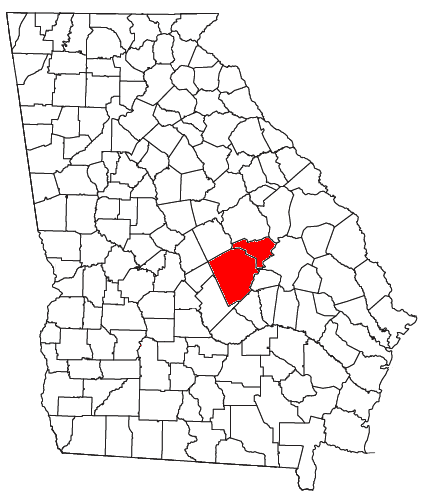
Location of the Dublin Micropolitan Statistical Area in Georgia

Dublin is the principal city of the Dublin micropolitan statistical area, a micropolitan area that covers Johnson and Laurens counties, and had a combined population of 58,759 at the 2020 census.

== Government ==
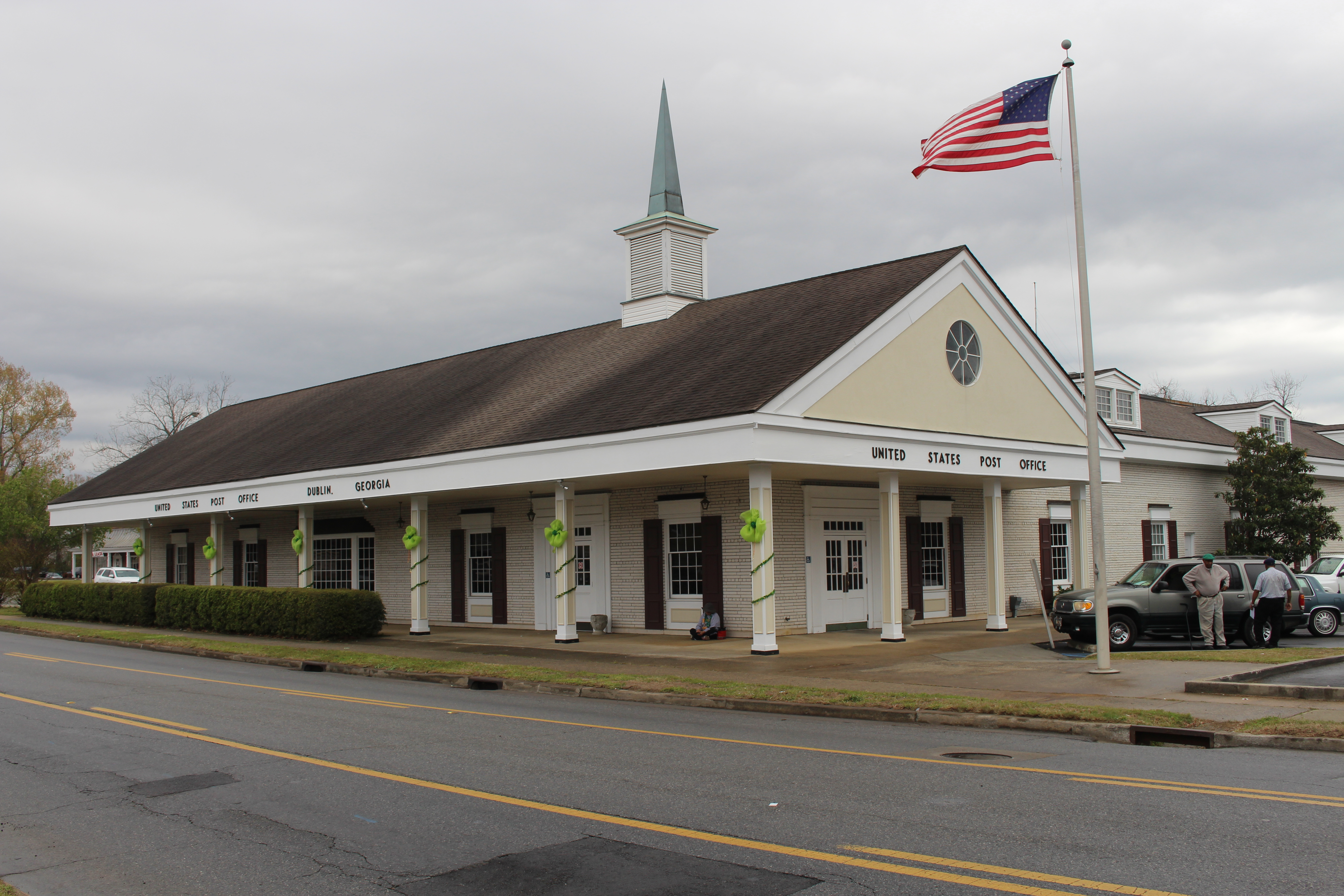
Post Office

Dublin's city government is made up of a mayor and a city council composed of seven council members. Four of the council members represent wards, or districts, within the city boundaries; the remaining three members are considered council members at large, representing the entire city as legislative members.

Dublin was chosen as a City of Excellence by the Georgia Municipal Association and Georgia Trend magazine in 2000. This distinction recognized Dublin as one of the ten best managed and most livable cities in Georgia when evaluated on areas like public safety, cultural activities, fiscal management, and downtown viability.

In 2005, Dublin was designated as a "Signature Community" by the Georgia Department of Community Affairs. Dublin was also recognized by the American Association of Retirement Communities (AARC) as a Seal of Approval Community in 2009.

The United States Postal Service operates the Dublin Post Office and the Court Square Station in Dublin.

The Carl Vinson Veterans Administration Medical Center is located in Dublin. It was originally commissioned as Naval Hospital Dublin on January 22, 1945, as an ideal location for convalescence from rheumatic fever. As such it was the site of the commissioning of Naval Medical Research Unit Four on May 31, 1946, to study the disease. The Navy transferred the hospital to the Veterans Affairs Department in November 1947, and it was subsequently named for congressman Carl Vinson who was responsible for getting it built in Dublin. Today, the medical center provides a range of services to veterans in Middle and South Georgia, including primary care, mental health, ambulatory and urgent care, optometry, women's health, and extended care. The medical center features a 340 operating-bed facility and has approximately 1,100 employees.

Dublin's Laurens County Library is known for its genealogy department, with archives and records going back two hundred years.

== Arts and culture ==
=== Theatre Dublin ===
Theatre Dublin, originally known as the Martin Theater, was constructed in 1934 in Dublin's Historic Downtown Commercial District. The theatre features Art Deco architectural design, with flat symmetrical wall surfacing and horizontal bands, in addition to an overhanging marquee and neon sign.

Since its renovation in 1996, Theatre Dublin has served as a performing arts center for Dublin-Laurens County and surrounding areas. The theatre houses a regular variety of events and performances, including musical artists, plays and performances, orchestras, concerts, and showings of both classical and contemporary films.

=== Dublin Carnegie Library ===
The Dublin Carnegie Library was built in 1904 by a grant from Andrew Carnegie. It is located in Dublin's Historic Downtown Commercial District, and the Dublin Carnegie is one of only three surviving Carnegie Libraries in the state of Georgia listed on the National Register of Historic Places and still in its original form. The Dublin Carnegie served as public library for the region until the 1960s, at which point the city and county constructed a larger public library. In the late 1970s, the Dublin Carnegie Library was structurally stabilized and maintained by the Dublin-Laurens Historical Society. For more than 35 years, the building served as the home of the Dublin-Laurens Museum.

In 2014, the Dublin-Laurens Museum moved to a new location, leaving the Dublin Carnegie Library unoccupied. The Dublin Downtown Development Authority then renovated the building to its historic stature, restoring many of the building's original features. Since the renovation by the DDA in 2014, the Dublin Carnegie has served as an event space and fine arts gallery, featuring local and statewide art displays.

== Education ==
=== Public schools ===
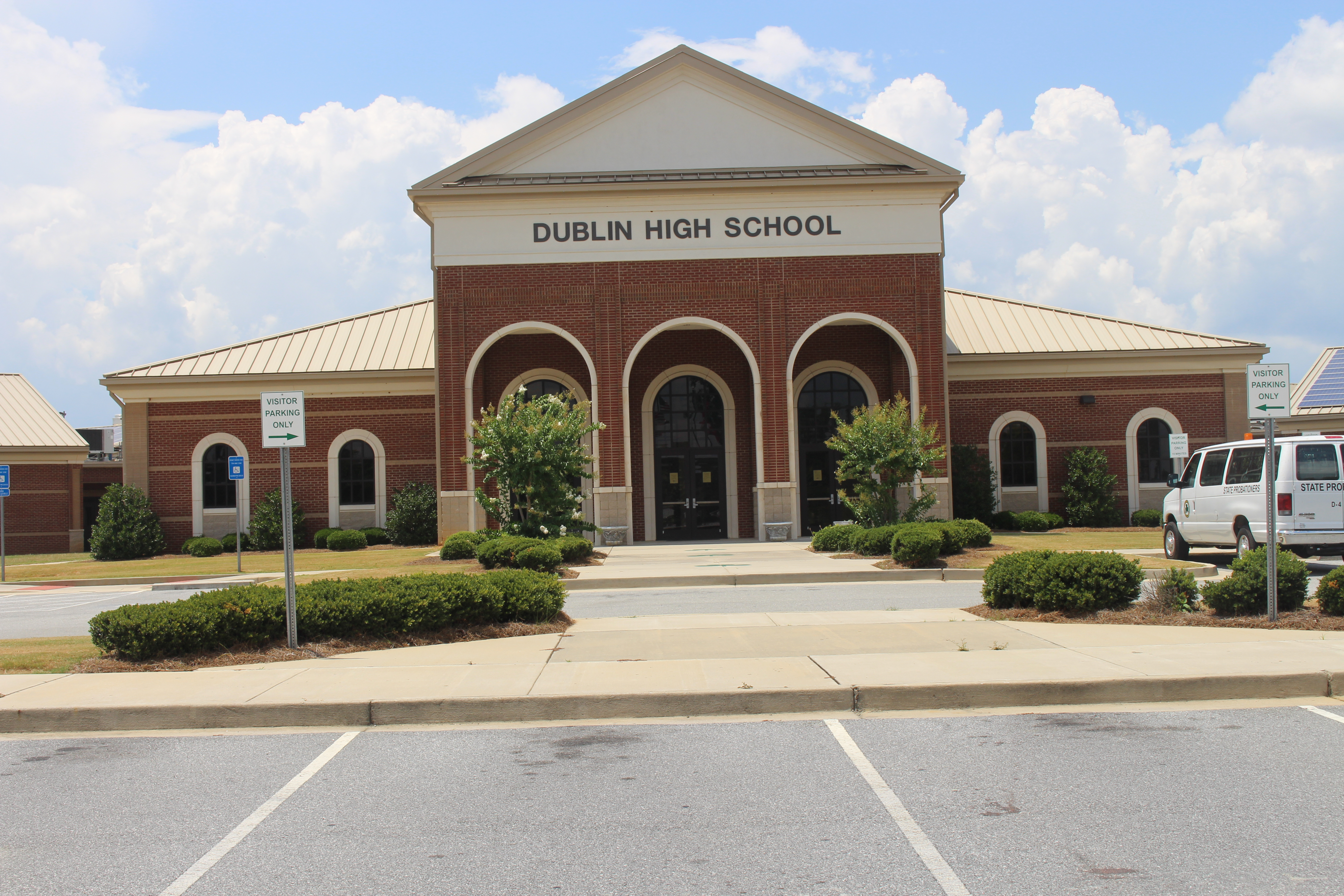
Dublin High School

The Dublin City School District, which includes areas in the Dublin city limits, holds pre-school to grade twelve, and consists of two elementary schools, a middle school, a high school, and an alternative school. The district has approximately 2,400 students as of 2016.

- Hillcrest Elementary School
- Susie Dasher Elementary School
- Dublin Middle School
- Dublin High School
- Moore Street School (Alternative)

The Laurens County School District holds grades pre-school to grade twelve, and serves areas outside of the Dublin city limits.

=== Private schools ===
- Trinity Christian School

=== Higher education ===
- Georgia Military College - Dublin Campus
- Oconee Fall Line Technical College - South Campus
- Middle Georgia State University - Dublin Campus

== Notable events ==
=== Festivals ===
Dublin is known for its St Patrick's festival which takes place annually during March.

=== Sister city ===
- Osaki, Miyagi, Japan

=== Pageants ===
Dublin is home to several scholarship pageants, which are largely popular in the southern United States:

- The Miss Saint Patrick's Scholarship pageant, sponsored by the Pilot Club, is held every year in March in conjunction with the Saint Patrick's Day celebration.
- Dublin and Laurens County's America's Junior Miss Pageant is a scholarship competition held yearly for high school juniors. The winners of both the Dublin and Laurens County pageants advance to the state pageant. Its new name is Distinguished Young Women.
- The Miss Irish Capital Scholarship Pageant is held yearly. The winner of the Miss and Outstanding Teen compete in The Miss Georgia Pageant, which is held yearly in Columbus, Ga.
- The Miss Dublin Scholarship Pageant is held yearly. The winner of the Miss and Outstanding Teen compete in The Miss Georgia Pageant, which is held yearly in Columbus, Ga.

== In literature ==
Dublin, the Oconee River, and Laurens County are mentioned in the opening page of James Joyce's Finnegans Wake: "nor had topsawyer's rocks by the stream Oconee exaggerated themselves to Laurens County's gorgios while they went doublin their mumper all the time." (Joyce explained in a letter: "Dublin, Laurens Co, Georgia, founded by a Dubliner, Peter Sawyer, on r. Oconee. Its motto: Doubling all the time.")

== Notable people ==
- Jamel Ashley, retired track athlete who competed in the sprint events
- Jermaine Hall, basketball player for Maccabi Ashdod of the Israeli Basketball Premier League
- Matt Hatchett - Businessman and politician. He is a member of the Georgia House of Representatives from the 150th District.
- Eleanor Ison Franklin (1929–1998), medical physiologist and endocrinologist
- Anthony Kewoa Johnson, retired American mixed martial artist who competed in the light heavyweight division of the Ultimate Fighting Championship
- Marcos Knight, professional basketball player
- J. Roy Rowland, congressman from 1983 to 1995 and a resident of Dublin
- Imagene Stewart (1942–2012), Baptist minister and activist
- Demaryius Thomas, football player in the NFL for the Denver Broncos
- Quincy Trouppe, baseball player in the Negro leagues
- Erik Walden, National Football League player
- Darrell Williams Jr., football player in the NFL for the San Francisco 49ers
- Leh Keen, racing driver

== See also ==
- List of Irish place names in other countries
